= 2018–19 ISU World Standings and Season's World Ranking =

Merit-based ice skating ranking

Season-end No. 1 skaters
- Men's singles: (United States) Nathan Chen
- Ladies' singles: (Russia) Alina Zagitova
- Pairs: (Russia) Evgenia Tarasova / Vladimir Morozov
- Ice dance: (United States) Madison Hubbell / Zachary Donohue

Season's No. 1 skaters
- Men's singles: (United States) Nathan Chen
- Ladies' singles: (Japan) Rika Kihira
- Pairs: (Russia) Evgenia Tarasova / Vladimir Morozov
- Ice dance: (United States) Madison Hubbell / Zachary Donohue

Season-end No. 1 teams
- Senior Synchronized: (Russia) Team Paradise
- Junior Synchronized: (Russia) Team Junost Junior

Navigation

The 2018–19 ISU World Standings and Season's World Ranking are the World Standings and Season's World Ranking published by the International Skating Union (ISU) during the 2018–19 season.

The single & pair skating and ice dance rankings take into account results of the 2016–17, 2017–18 and 2018–19 seasons.

The 2018–19 ISU season's world ranking is based on the results of the 2018–19 season only.

The 2018–19 ISU world standings for synchronized skating are based on the results of the 2016–17, 2017–18 and 2018–19 seasons.

== World Standings for single & pair skating and ice dance ==
=== Men's singles ===
As of April 9, 2019.

Rank	Nation	Skater	Points	Season	ISU Championships or Olympics	(Junior) Grand Prix and Final		Selected International Competition	
Rank	Nation	Skater	Points	Season	Best	Best	2nd Best	Best	2nd Best
1	USA	Nathan Chen	5414	2018/2019 season (100%)	1200	800	400	0	0
1	USA	Nathan Chen	5414	2017/2018 season (100%)	1200	800	400	300	0
1	USA	Nathan Chen	5414	2016/2017 season (70%)	588	504	252	210	0
2	JPN	Shoma Uno	5059	2018/2019 season (100%)	875	720	400	300	0
2	JPN	Shoma Uno	5059	2017/2018 season (100%)	1080	720	400	300	0
2	JPN	Shoma Uno	5059	2016/2017 season (70%)	756	454	280	210	0
3	JPN	Yuzuru Hanyu	4780	2018/2019 season (100%)	1080	400	400	300	0
3	JPN	Yuzuru Hanyu	4780	2017/2018 season (100%)	1200	360	0	270	0
3	JPN	Yuzuru Hanyu	4780	2016/2017 season (70%)	840	560	280	210	0
4	RUS	Mikhail Kolyada	4432	2018/2019 season (100%)	709	292	292	300	300
4	RUS	Mikhail Kolyada	4432	2017/2018 season (100%)	972	648	400	300	219
4	RUS	Mikhail Kolyada	4432	2016/2017 season (70%)	476	204	183	153	0
5	USA	Jason Brown	3674	2018/2019 season (100%)	551	360	236	300	219
5	USA	Jason Brown	3674	2017/2018 season (100%)	680	472	360	270	0
5	USA	Jason Brown	3674	2016/2017 season (70%)	447	252	149	210	189
6	USA	Vincent Zhou	3619	2018/2019 season (100%)	972	292	262	270	219
6	USA	Vincent Zhou	3619	2017/2018 season (100%)	709	292	0	270	0
6	USA	Vincent Zhou	3619	2016/2017 season (70%)	350	158	142	175	0
7	ESP	Javier Fernández	3436	2018/2019 season (100%)	840	0	0	0	0
7	ESP	Javier Fernández	3436	2017/2018 season (100%)	972	400	236	300	0
7	ESP	Javier Fernández	3436	2016/2017 season (70%)	613	408	280	0	0
8	CAN	Keegan Messing	3390	2018/2019 season (100%)	612	525	360	300	0
8	CAN	Keegan Messing	3390	2017/2018 season (100%)	574	262	191	243	0
8	CAN	Keegan Messing	3390	2016/2017 season (70%)	0	0	0	170	153
9	RUS	Alexander Samarin	3298	2018/2019 season (100%)	756	324	292	243	198
9	RUS	Alexander Samarin	3298	2017/2018 season (100%)	496	324	292	198	0
9	RUS	Alexander Samarin	3298	2016/2017 season (70%)	284	221	175	175	0
10	CHN	Jin Boyang	3128	2018/2019 season (100%)	787	262	0	0	0
10	CHN	Jin Boyang	3128	2017/2018 season (100%)	875	360	292	300	0
10	CHN	Jin Boyang	3128	2016/2017 season (70%)	680	252	183	0	0
11	ISR	Oleksii Bychenko	3094	2018/2019 season (100%)	362	0	0	0	0
11	ISR	Oleksii Bychenko	3094	2017/2018 season (100%)	875	324	262	270	178
11	ISR	Oleksii Bychenko	3094	2016/2017 season (70%)	386	227	204	210	158
12	ITA	Matteo Rizzo	3093	2018/2019 season (100%)	680	324	292	250	219
12	ITA	Matteo Rizzo	3093	2017/2018 season (100%)	405	250	148	300	225
12	ITA	Matteo Rizzo	3093	2016/2017 season (70%)	122	84	0	175	127
13	RUS	Dmitri Aliev	3063	2018/2019 season (100%)	0	292	262	270	198
13	RUS	Dmitri Aliev	3063	2017/2018 season (100%)	756	236	191	300	0
13	RUS	Dmitri Aliev	3063	2016/2017 season (70%)	315	245	175	189	0
14	CZE	Michal Březina	2870	2018/2019 season (100%)	574	583	360	270	0
14	CZE	Michal Březina	2870	2017/2018 season (100%)	465	236	0	178	0
14	CZE	Michal Březina	2870	2016/2017 season (70%)	185	204	0	0	0
15	RUS	Sergei Voronov	2865	2018/2019 season (100%)	0	472	360	270	0
15	RUS	Sergei Voronov	2865	2017/2018 season (100%)	0	583	400	300	270
15	RUS	Sergei Voronov	2865	2016/2017 season (70%)	0	227	204	210	0
16	LAT	Deniss Vasiļjevs	2821	2018/2019 season (100%)	293	213	191	250	250
16	LAT	Deniss Vasiļjevs	2821	2017/2018 season (100%)	709	236	191	250	219
16	LAT	Deniss Vasiļjevs	2821	2016/2017 season (70%)	312	165	0	175	0
17	GEO	Morisi Kvitelashvili	2767	2018/2019 season (100%)	339	360	191	243	219
17	GEO	Morisi Kvitelashvili	2767	2017/2018 season (100%)	264	262	236	300	270
17	GEO	Morisi Kvitelashvili	2767	2016/2017 season (70%)	347	0	0	175	142
18	JPN	Keiji Tanaka	2692	2018/2019 season (100%)	446	191	191	243	0
18	JPN	Keiji Tanaka	2692	2017/2018 season (100%)	612	213	0	250	144
18	JPN	Keiji Tanaka	2692	2016/2017 season (70%)	166	227	149	175	0
19	KOR	Cha Jun-hwan	2657	2018/2019 season (100%)	496	648	324	270	270
19	KOR	Cha Jun-hwan	2657	2017/2018 season (100%)	275	0	0	0	0
19	KOR	Cha Jun-hwan	2657	2016/2017 season (70%)	230	199	175	0	0
20	JPN	Kazuki Tomono	2478	2018/2019 season (100%)	264	324	0	198	0
20	JPN	Kazuki Tomono	2478	2017/2018 season (100%)	787	213	0	225	198
20	JPN	Kazuki Tomono	2478	2016/2017 season (70%)	151	142	127	0	0
21	RUS	Roman Savosin	2363	2018/2019 season (100%)	450	203	164	198	0
21	RUS	Roman Savosin	2363	2017/2018 season (100%)	328	225	182	219	0
21	RUS	Roman Savosin	2363	2016/2017 season (70%)	0	178	175	210	170
22	USA	Adam Rippon	2320	2018/2019 season (100%)	0	0	0	0	0
22	USA	Adam Rippon	2320	2017/2018 season (100%)	465	525	360	243	0
22	USA	Adam Rippon	2320	2016/2017 season (70%)	0	330	227	170	0
23	USA	Alexei Krasnozhon	2245	2018/2019 season (100%)	174	213	191	250	198
23	USA	Alexei Krasnozhon	2245	2017/2018 season (100%)	0	350	250	270	182
23	USA	Alexei Krasnozhon	2245	2016/2017 season (70%)	167	175	161	0	0
24	CAN	Nam Nguyen	2200	2018/2019 season (100%)	325	262	236	300	0
24	CAN	Nam Nguyen	2200	2017/2018 season (100%)	362	213	0	198	0
24	CAN	Nam Nguyen	2200	2016/2017 season (70%)	281	165	134	139	0
25	ITA	Daniel Grassl	2194	2018/2019 season (100%)	496	203	164	300	250
25	ITA	Daniel Grassl	2194	2017/2018 season (100%)	0	148	133	250	250
25	ITA	Daniel Grassl	2194	2016/2017 season (70%)	0	93	93	0	0
26	UZB	Misha Ge	2167	2018/2019 season (100%)	0	0	0	0	0
26	UZB	Misha Ge	2167	2017/2018 season (100%)	517	324	292	219	0
26	UZB	Misha Ge	2167	2016/2017 season (70%)	312	165	149	189	0
27	FRA	Kévin Aymoz	2127	2018/2019 season (100%)	612	262	213	198	0
27	FRA	Kévin Aymoz	2127	2017/2018 season (100%)	0	0	0	250	0
27	FRA	Kévin Aymoz	2127	2016/2017 season (70%)	186	127	104	175	0
28	BEL	Jorik Hendrickx	2069	2018/2019 season (100%)	0	0	0	0	0
28	BEL	Jorik Hendrickx	2069	2017/2018 season (100%)	325	262	0	300	225
28	BEL	Jorik Hendrickx	2069	2016/2017 season (70%)	428	165	0	189	175
29	USA	Camden Pulkinen	1939	2018/2019 season (100%)	239	250	230	182	178
29	USA	Camden Pulkinen	1939	2017/2018 season (100%)	295	315	250	0	0
29	USA	Camden Pulkinen	1939	2016/2017 season (70%)	0	76	0	0	0
30	ISR	Daniel Samohin	1913	2018/2019 season (100%)	237	191	0	219	178
30	ISR	Daniel Samohin	1913	2017/2018 season (100%)	339	0	0	243	0
30	ISR	Daniel Samohin	1913	2016/2017 season (70%)	207	183	134	189	142
31	USA	Tomoki Hiwatashi	1865	2018/2019 season (100%)	500	225	225	243	0
31	USA	Tomoki Hiwatashi	1865	2017/2018 season (100%)	266	203	203	0	0
31	USA	Tomoki Hiwatashi	1865	2016/2017 season (70%)	0	104	0	0	0
32	SWE	Alexander Majorov	1843	2018/2019 season (100%)	402	0	0	270	225
32	SWE	Alexander Majorov	1843	2017/2018 season (100%)	446	0	0	250	250
32	SWE	Alexander Majorov	1843	2016/2017 season (70%)	205	0	0	210	175
33	RUS	Andrei Lazukin	1718	2018/2019 season (100%)	465	236	213	243	225
33	RUS	Andrei Lazukin	1718	2017/2018 season (100%)	0	0	0	178	144
33	RUS	Andrei Lazukin	1718	2016/2017 season (70%)	0	0	0	158	0
34	USA	Andrew Torgashev	1687	2018/2019 season (100%)	0	250	182	250	225
34	USA	Andrew Torgashev	1687	2017/2018 season (100%)	0	225	207	178	0
34	USA	Andrew Torgashev	1687	2016/2017 season (70%)	0	158	127	170	0
35	AUS	Brendan Kerry	1585	2018/2019 season (100%)	362	0	0	250	250
35	AUS	Brendan Kerry	1585	2017/2018 season (100%)	237	0	0	243	243
35	AUS	Brendan Kerry	1585	2016/2017 season (70%)	205	0	0	153	139
36	FRA	Chafik Besseghier	1527	2018/2019 season (100%)	0	0	0	0	0
36	FRA	Chafik Besseghier	1527	2017/2018 season (100%)	293	0	0	203	160
36	FRA	Chafik Besseghier	1527	2016/2017 season (70%)	253	134	134	175	175
37	RUS	Maxim Kovtun	1511	2018/2019 season (100%)	214	0	0	300	0
37	RUS	Maxim Kovtun	1511	2017/2018 season (100%)	0	0	0	0	0
37	RUS	Maxim Kovtun	1511	2016/2017 season (70%)	529	149	149	170	0
38	CHN	Yan Han	1510	2018/2019 season (100%)	0	0	0	0	0
38	CHN	Yan Han	1510	2017/2018 season (100%)	325	262	262	250	0
38	CHN	Yan Han	1510	2016/2017 season (70%)	228	183	0	0	0
39	GER	Paul Fentz	1442	2018/2019 season (100%)	192	236	0	225	144
39	GER	Paul Fentz	1442	2017/2018 season (100%)	275	0	0	160	160
39	GER	Paul Fentz	1442	2016/2017 season (70%)	228	0	0	158	142
40	FRA	Adam Siao Him Fa	1433	2018/2019 season (100%)	295	255	250	160	0
40	FRA	Adam Siao Him Fa	1433	2017/2018 season (100%)	93	108	108	164	0
40	FRA	Adam Siao Him Fa	1433	2016/2017 season (70%)	0	0	0	0	0
41	JPN	Koshiro Shimada	1369	2018/2019 season (100%)	215	284	225	250	0
41	JPN	Koshiro Shimada	1369	2017/2018 season (100%)	0	164	133	0	0
41	JPN	Koshiro Shimada	1369	2016/2017 season (70%)	89	142	127	0	0
42	RUS	Alexander Petrov	1365	2018/2019 season (100%)	0	0	0	250	0
42	RUS	Alexander Petrov	1365	2017/2018 season (100%)	0	0	0	160	144
42	RUS	Alexander Petrov	1365	2016/2017 season (70%)	256	165	149	210	175
43	JPN	Mitsuki Sumoto	1357	2018/2019 season (100%)	0	225	164	219	0
43	JPN	Mitsuki Sumoto	1357	2017/2018 season (100%)	215	284	250	0	0
43	JPN	Mitsuki Sumoto	1357	2016/2017 season (70%)	0	142	115	0	0
44	RUS	Alexey Erokhov	1302	2018/2019 season (100%)	0	0	0	160	0
44	RUS	Alexey Erokhov	1302	2017/2018 season (100%)	500	250	250	0	0
44	RUS	Alexey Erokhov	1302	2016/2017 season (70%)	0	142	0	0	0
45	RUS	Artur Danielian	1294	2018/2019 season (100%)	365	182	164	0	0
45	RUS	Artur Danielian	1294	2017/2018 season (100%)	450	133	0	0	0
45	RUS	Artur Danielian	1294	2016/2017 season (70%)	0	0	0	0	0
46	GEO	Irakli Maysuradze	1278	2018/2019 season (100%)	266	133	120	0	0
46	GEO	Irakli Maysuradze	1278	2017/2018 season (100%)	157	182	0	0	0
46	GEO	Irakli Maysuradze	1278	2016/2017 season (70%)	0	104	93	158	158
47	UKR	Ivan Pavlov	1256	2018/2019 season (100%)	0	0	0	0	0
47	UKR	Ivan Pavlov	1256	2017/2018 season (100%)	239	164	148	160	0
47	UKR	Ivan Pavlov	1256	2016/2017 season (70%)	150	127	93	175	0
48	CAN	Joseph Phan	1247	2018/2019 season (100%)	157	203	108	0	0
48	CAN	Joseph Phan	1247	2017/2018 season (100%)	365	225	182	0	0
48	CAN	Joseph Phan	1247	2016/2017 season (70%)	0	115	104	0	0
49	GBR	Graham Newberry	1210	2018/2019 season (100%)	102	0	0	225	203
49	GBR	Graham Newberry	1210	2017/2018 season (100%)	0	0	0	250	225
49	GBR	Graham Newberry	1210	2016/2017 season (70%)	121	84	0	158	142
50	MAS	Julian Zhi Jie Yee	1209	2018/2019 season (100%)	118	213	0	160	0
50	MAS	Julian Zhi Jie Yee	1209	2017/2018 season (100%)	173	0	0	198	178
50	MAS	Julian Zhi Jie Yee	1209	2016/2017 season (70%)	134	0	0	153	142
51	CAN	Conrad Orzel	1190	2018/2019 season (100%)	0	182	182	225	0
51	CAN	Conrad Orzel	1190	2017/2018 season (100%)	141	203	133	0	0
51	CAN	Conrad Orzel	1190	2016/2017 season (70%)	99	158	68	0	0
52	JPN	Takahito Mura	1143	2018/2019 season (100%)	0	0	0	0	0
52	JPN	Takahito Mura	1143	2017/2018 season (100%)	264	213	0	160	0
52	JPN	Takahito Mura	1143	2016/2017 season (70%)	0	183	134	189	0
53	UKR	Yaroslav Paniot	1142	2018/2019 season (100%)	0	0	0	164	144
53	UKR	Yaroslav Paniot	1142	2017/2018 season (100%)	0	0	0	243	225
53	UKR	Yaroslav Paniot	1142	2016/2017 season (70%)	136	115	115	0	0
54	TPE	Chih-I Tsao	1120	2018/2019 season (100%)	0	0	0	270	225
54	TPE	Chih-I Tsao	1120	2017/2018 season (100%)	156	0	0	182	0
54	TPE	Chih-I Tsao	1120	2016/2017 season (70%)	88	84	0	115	0
55	USA	Grant Hochstein	1074	2018/2019 season (100%)	0	0	0	0	0
55	USA	Grant Hochstein	1074	2017/2018 season (100%)	293	0	0	219	0
55	USA	Grant Hochstein	1074	2016/2017 season (70%)	253	0	0	170	139
56	SUI	Stephane Walker	1067	2018/2019 season (100%)	0	0	0	0	0
56	SUI	Stephane Walker	1067	2017/2018 season (100%)	140	0	0	270	203
56	SUI	Stephane Walker	1067	2016/2017 season (70%)	109	0	0	175	170
57	CAN	Nicolas Nadeau	1013	2018/2019 season (100%)	293	0	0	219	0
57	CAN	Nicolas Nadeau	1013	2017/2018 season (100%)	0	213	0	178	0
57	CAN	Nicolas Nadeau	1013	2016/2017 season (70%)	110	0	0	0	0
58	FRA	Romain Ponsart	1010	2018/2019 season (100%)	0	236	0	0	0
58	FRA	Romain Ponsart	1010	2017/2018 season (100%)	247	0	0	203	182
58	FRA	Romain Ponsart	1010	2016/2017 season (70%)	0	0	0	142	0
59	RUS	Petr Gumennik	1001	2018/2019 season (100%)	194	315	250	0	0
59	RUS	Petr Gumennik	1001	2017/2018 season (100%)	0	0	0	0	0
59	RUS	Petr Gumennik	1001	2016/2017 season (70%)	0	127	115	0	0
60	AUT	Maurizio Zandron	991	2018/2019 season (100%)	0	0	0	225	203
60	AUT	Maurizio Zandron	991	2017/2018 season (100%)	0	0	0	250	225
60	AUT	Maurizio Zandron	991	2016/2017 season (70%)	88	0	0	175	158
61	ISR	Mark Gorodnitsky	987	2018/2019 season (100%)	93	148	133	225	0
61	ISR	Mark Gorodnitsky	987	2017/2018 season (100%)	127	164	97	0	0
61	ISR	Mark Gorodnitsky	987	2016/2017 season (70%)	39	68	0	0	0
62	USA	Timothy Dolensky	984	2018/2019 season (100%)	0	0	0	219	203
62	USA	Timothy Dolensky	984	2017/2018 season (100%)	0	0	0	250	178
62	USA	Timothy Dolensky	984	2016/2017 season (70%)	0	134	0	125	112
63	RUS	Makar Ignatov	980	2018/2019 season (100%)	0	0	0	0	0
63	RUS	Makar Ignatov	980	2017/2018 season (100%)	0	255	225	198	160
63	RUS	Makar Ignatov	980	2016/2017 season (70%)	0	0	0	142	0
64	NOR	Sondre Oddvoll Bøe	972	2018/2019 season (100%)	140	0	0	250	203
64	NOR	Sondre Oddvoll Bøe	972	2017/2018 season (100%)	92	0	0	203	0
64	NOR	Sondre Oddvoll Bøe	972	2016/2017 season (70%)	53	84	0	0	0
65	ARM	Slavik Hayrapetyan	971	2018/2019 season (100%)	0	0	0	219	203
65	ARM	Slavik Hayrapetyan	971	2017/2018 season (100%)	192	0	0	144	0
65	ARM	Slavik Hayrapetyan	971	2016/2017 season (70%)	71	0	0	142	0
66	CAN	Roman Sadovsky	963	2018/2019 season (100%)	0	0	0	270	243
66	CAN	Roman Sadovsky	963	2017/2018 season (100%)	0	0	0	0	0
66	CAN	Roman Sadovsky	963	2016/2017 season (70%)	65	158	115	112	0
67	RUS	Egor Murashov	958	2018/2019 season (100%)	0	182	0	250	203
67	RUS	Egor Murashov	958	2017/2018 season (100%)	0	203	120	0	0
67	RUS	Egor Murashov	958	2016/2017 season (70%)	0	0	0	0	0
68	JPN	Sōta Yamamoto	950	2018/2019 season (100%)	0	236	0	300	250
68	JPN	Sōta Yamamoto	950	2017/2018 season (100%)	0	0	0	164	0
68	JPN	Sōta Yamamoto	950	2016/2017 season (70%)	0	0	0	0	0
69	FIN	Valtter Virtanen	936	2018/2019 season (100%)	0	0	0	164	160
69	FIN	Valtter Virtanen	936	2017/2018 season (100%)	126	0	0	225	203
69	FIN	Valtter Virtanen	936	2016/2017 season (70%)	58	0	0	115	0
70	CAN	Stephen Gogolev	928	2018/2019 season (100%)	328	350	250	0	0
70	CAN	Stephen Gogolev	928	2017/2018 season (100%)	0	0	0	0	0
70	CAN	Stephen Gogolev	928	2016/2017 season (70%)	0	0	0	0	0
71	FRA	Luc Economides	893	2018/2019 season (100%)	0	0	0	160	144
71	FRA	Luc Economides	893	2017/2018 season (100%)	114	225	182	0	0
71	FRA	Luc Economides	893	2016/2017 season (70%)	0	68	0	0	0
72	SUI	Lukas Britschgi	857	2018/2019 season (100%)	0	0	0	203	144
72	SUI	Lukas Britschgi	857	2017/2018 season (100%)	0	0	0	225	203
72	SUI	Lukas Britschgi	857	2016/2017 season (70%)	0	68	0	158	0
73	POL	Igor Reznichenko	850	2018/2019 season (100%)	0	0	0	164	164
73	POL	Igor Reznichenko	850	2017/2018 season (100%)	74	0	0	250	198
73	POL	Igor Reznichenko	850	2016/2017 season (70%)	0	0	0	153	0
74	AUT	Luc Maierhofer	844	2018/2019 season (100%)	113	108	97	198	164
74	AUT	Luc Maierhofer	844	2017/2018 season (100%)	0	0	0	164	0
74	AUT	Luc Maierhofer	844	2016/2017 season (70%)	0	0	0	0	0
75	CZE	Matyáš Bělohradský	839	2018/2019 season (100%)	126	148	97	178	0
75	CZE	Matyáš Bělohradský	839	2017/2018 season (100%)	0	148	0	0	0
75	CZE	Matyáš Bělohradský	839	2016/2017 season (70%)	0	142	76	0	0
76	EST	Daniel Albert Naurits	836	2018/2019 season (100%)	0	0	0	164	0
76	EST	Daniel Albert Naurits	836	2017/2018 season (100%)	102	0	0	182	182
76	EST	Daniel Albert Naurits	836	2016/2017 season (70%)	64	0	0	142	0
77	TUR	Burak Demirboğa	835	2018/2019 season (100%)	0	0	0	203	164
77	TUR	Burak Demirboğa	835	2017/2018 season (100%)	83	0	0	203	182
77	TUR	Burak Demirboğa	835	2016/2017 season (70%)	0	0	0	0	0
78	EST	Aleksandr Selevko	830	2018/2019 season (100%)	156	0	0	225	203
78	EST	Aleksandr Selevko	830	2017/2018 season (100%)	0	0	0	0	0
78	EST	Aleksandr Selevko	830	2016/2017 season (70%)	0	104	0	142	0
79	AZE	Vladimir Litvintsev	817	2018/2019 season (100%)	222	120	0	250	225
79	AZE	Vladimir Litvintsev	817	2017/2018 season (100%)	0	0	0	0	0
79	AZE	Vladimir Litvintsev	817	2016/2017 season (70%)	0	0	0	0	0
80	CZE	Jiří Bělohradský	813	2018/2019 season (100%)	0	0	0	182	144
80	CZE	Jiří Bělohradský	813	2017/2018 season (100%)	0	148	108	0	0
80	CZE	Jiří Bělohradský	813	2016/2017 season (70%)	79	84	68	0	0
81	TUR	Başar Oktar	794	2018/2019 season (100%)	75	0	0	164	0
81	TUR	Başar Oktar	794	2017/2018 season (100%)	0	182	148	225	0
81	TUR	Başar Oktar	794	2016/2017 season (70%)	0	0	0	0	0
82	JPN	Yuto Kishina	790	2018/2019 season (100%)	0	203	108	182	0
82	JPN	Yuto Kishina	790	2017/2018 season (100%)	0	164	133	0	0
82	JPN	Yuto Kishina	790	2016/2017 season (70%)	0	76	0	0	0
83	ESP	Javier Raya	787	2018/2019 season (100%)	0	0	0	0	0
83	ESP	Javier Raya	787	2017/2018 season (100%)	0	0	0	225	225
83	ESP	Javier Raya	787	2016/2017 season (70%)	98	0	0	127	112
84	ITA	Jari Kessler	773	2018/2019 season (100%)	0	0	0	203	164
84	ITA	Jari Kessler	773	2017/2018 season (100%)	0	0	0	203	203
84	ITA	Jari Kessler	773	2016/2017 season (70%)	0	0	0	0	0
85	USA	Alexander Johnson	772	2018/2019 season (100%)	0	213	0	0	0
85	USA	Alexander Johnson	772	2017/2018 season (100%)	0	0	0	270	164
85	USA	Alexander Johnson	772	2016/2017 season (70%)	0	0	0	125	0
86	KOR	Lee June-hyoung	753	2018/2019 season (100%)	214	0	0	0	0
86	KOR	Lee June-hyoung	753	2017/2018 season (100%)	214	0	0	198	0
86	KOR	Lee June-hyoung	753	2016/2017 season (70%)	98	0	0	127	0
87	RUS	Anton Shulepov	750	2018/2019 season (100%)	0	0	0	243	160
87	RUS	Anton Shulepov	750	2017/2018 season (100%)	0	0	0	0	0
87	RUS	Anton Shulepov	750	2016/2017 season (70%)	0	0	0	189	158
88	HUN	Alexander Maszljanko	749	2018/2019 season (100%)	0	0	0	203	182
88	HUN	Alexander Maszljanko	749	2017/2018 season (100%)	0	0	0	182	182
88	HUN	Alexander Maszljanko	749	2016/2017 season (70%)	0	0	0	0	0
89	SUI	Nicola Todeschini	744	2018/2019 season (100%)	0	0	0	250	203
89	SUI	Nicola Todeschini	744	2017/2018 season (100%)	0	0	0	164	0
89	SUI	Nicola Todeschini	744	2016/2017 season (70%)	0	0	0	127	0
90	USA	Ross Miner	737	2018/2019 season (100%)	0	0	0	0	0
90	USA	Ross Miner	737	2017/2018 season (100%)	0	236	0	198	178
90	USA	Ross Miner	737	2016/2017 season (70%)	0	0	0	125	0
91	GBR	Phillip Harris	725	2018/2019 season (100%)	0	0	0	0	0
91	GBR	Phillip Harris	725	2017/2018 season (100%)	237	0	0	203	0
91	GBR	Phillip Harris	725	2016/2017 season (70%)	0	0	0	158	127
92	CZE	Petr Kotlařík	724	2018/2019 season (100%)	0	0	0	160	144
92	CZE	Petr Kotlařík	724	2017/2018 season (100%)	68	0	0	203	0
92	CZE	Petr Kotlařík	724	2016/2017 season (70%)	34	0	0	115	0
93	KOR	An Geon-hyeong	674	2018/2019 season (100%)	0	164	97	0	0
93	KOR	An Geon-hyeong	674	2017/2018 season (100%)	113	97	0	203	0
93	KOR	An Geon-hyeong	674	2016/2017 season (70%)	0	0	0	0	0
94	ITA	Gabriele Frangipani	673	2018/2019 season (100%)	49	120	97	225	182
94	ITA	Gabriele Frangipani	673	2017/2018 season (100%)	0	0	0	0	0
94	ITA	Gabriele Frangipani	673	2016/2017 season (70%)	0	0	0	0	0
95	KAZ	Abzal Rakimgaliev	668	2018/2019 season (100%)	0	0	0	0	0
95	KAZ	Abzal Rakimgaliev	668	2017/2018 season (100%)	83	0	0	182	164
95	KAZ	Abzal Rakimgaliev	668	2016/2017 season (70%)	0	0	0	127	112
96	KOR	Lee Si-hyeong	655	2018/2019 season (100%)	192	0	0	0	0
96	KOR	Lee Si-hyeong	655	2017/2018 season (100%)	174	108	97	0	0
96	KOR	Lee Si-hyeong	655	2016/2017 season (70%)	121	84	0	0	0
97	ITA	Ivan Righini	635	2018/2019 season (100%)	0	0	0	0	0
97	ITA	Ivan Righini	635	2017/2018 season (100%)	0	0	0	250	219
97	ITA	Ivan Righini	635	2016/2017 season (70%)	166	0	0	0	0
98	JPN	Yuma Kagiyama	632	2018/2019 season (100%)	0	225	182	225	0
98	JPN	Yuma Kagiyama	632	2017/2018 season (100%)	0	0	0	0	0
98	JPN	Yuma Kagiyama	632	2016/2017 season (70%)	0	0	0	0	0
99	RUS	Artur Dmitriev	611	2018/2019 season (100%)	0	0	0	243	0
99	RUS	Artur Dmitriev	611	2017/2018 season (100%)	0	0	0	243	0
99	RUS	Artur Dmitriev	611	2016/2017 season (70%)	0	0	0	125	0
100	GBR	Peter James Hallam	610	2018/2019 season (100%)	0	0	0	203	182
100	GBR	Peter James Hallam	610	2017/2018 season (100%)	0	0	0	225	0
100	GBR	Peter James Hallam	610	2016/2017 season (70%)	0	0	0	0	0
101	HKG	Harrison Jon-Yen Wong	502	2018/2019 season (100%)	102	0	0	178	160
101	HKG	Harrison Jon-Yen Wong	502	2017/2018 season (100%)	0	0	0	164	0
101	HKG	Harrison Jon-Yen Wong	502	2016/2017 season (70%)	0	0	0	0	0
102	USA	Ryan Dunk	584	2018/2019 season (100%)	0	164	148	164	0
102	USA	Ryan Dunk	584	2017/2018 season (100%)	0	108	0	0	0
102	USA	Ryan Dunk	584	2016/2017 season (70%)	0	0	0	0	0
103	FRA	Adrien Tesson	578	2018/2019 season (100%)	0	0	0	0	0
103	FRA	Adrien Tesson	578	2017/2018 season (100%)	0	0	0	250	203
103	FRA	Adrien Tesson	578	2016/2017 season (70%)	0	0	0	125	0
104	BUL	Nicky Obreykov	571	2018/2019 season (100%)	0	0	0	225	182
104	BUL	Nicky Obreykov	571	2017/2018 season (100%)	0	0	0	164	0
104	BUL	Nicky Obreykov	571	2016/2017 season (70%)	0	0	0	0	0
105	GER	Thomas Stoll	551	2018/2019 season (100%)	0	0	0	144	144
105	GER	Thomas Stoll	551	2017/2018 season (100%)	0	0	0	164	0
105	GER	Thomas Stoll	551	2016/2017 season (70%)	31	68	0	0	0
106	JPN	Sena Miyake	550	2018/2019 season (100%)	0	97	0	250	0
106	JPN	Sena Miyake	550	2017/2018 season (100%)	83	120	0	0	0
106	JPN	Sena Miyake	550	2016/2017 season (70%)	0	0	0	0	0
107	AUS	Andrew Dodds	542	2018/2019 season (100%)	237	0	0	203	0
107	AUS	Andrew Dodds	542	2017/2018 season (100%)	102	0	0	0	0
107	AUS	Andrew Dodds	542	2016/2017 season (70%)	79	0	0	0	0
108	UKR	Ivan Shmuratko	536	2018/2019 season (100%)	103	133	97	203	0
108	UKR	Ivan Shmuratko	536	2017/2018 season (100%)	0	0	0	0	0
108	UKR	Ivan Shmuratko	536	2016/2017 season (70%)	0	0	0	0	0
109	AZE	Larry Loupolover	530	2018/2019 season (100%)	0	0	0	164	0
109	AZE	Larry Loupolover	530	2017/2018 season (100%)	0	97	0	0	0
109	AZE	Larry Loupolover	530	2016/2017 season (70%)	0	0	0	142	127
110	RUS	Igor Efimchuk	525	2018/2019 season (100%)	0	0	0	0	0
110	RUS	Igor Efimchuk	525	2017/2018 season (100%)	0	203	164	0	0
110	RUS	Igor Efimchuk	525	2016/2017 season (70%)	0	0	0	158	0
111	JPN	Hiroaki Sato	518	2018/2019 season (100%)	0	0	0	178	0
111	JPN	Hiroaki Sato	518	2017/2018 season (100%)	0	0	0	182	0
111	JPN	Hiroaki Sato	518	2016/2017 season (70%)	0	0	0	158	0
112	JPN	Ryuju Hino	516	2018/2019 season (100%)	0	0	0	0	0
112	JPN	Ryuju Hino	516	2017/2018 season (100%)	0	0	0	225	164
112	JPN	Ryuju Hino	516	2016/2017 season (70%)	0	0	0	127	0
113	MEX	Donovan Carrillo	505	2018/2019 season (100%)	156	0	0	0	0
113	MEX	Donovan Carrillo	505	2017/2018 season (100%)	140	133	0	0	0
113	MEX	Donovan Carrillo	505	2016/2017 season (70%)	0	76	0	0	0
114	ITA	Mattia Dalla Torre	504	2018/2019 season (100%)	0	0	0	0	0
114	ITA	Mattia Dalla Torre	504	2017/2018 season (100%)	0	0	0	225	164
114	ITA	Mattia Dalla Torre	504	2016/2017 season (70%)	0	0	0	115	0
115	ITA	Alessandro Fadini	498	2018/2019 season (100%)	0	0	0	0	0
115	ITA	Alessandro Fadini	498	2017/2018 season (100%)	0	0	0	225	0
115	ITA	Alessandro Fadini	498	2016/2017 season (70%)	0	0	0	158	115
116	AUS	Mark Webster	471	2018/2019 season (100%)	74	0	0	0	0
116	AUS	Mark Webster	471	2017/2018 season (100%)	0	0	0	182	144
116	AUS	Mark Webster	471	2016/2017 season (70%)	71	0	0	0	0
117	RUS	Konstantin Miliukov	469	2018/2019 season (100%)	0	0	0	219	0
117	RUS	Konstantin Miliukov	469	2017/2018 season (100%)	0	0	0	250	0
117	RUS	Konstantin Miliukov	469	2016/2017 season (70%)	0	0	0	0	0
118	USA	Jimmy Ma	468	2018/2019 season (100%)	0	0	0	243	225
118	USA	Jimmy Ma	468	2017/2018 season (100%)	0	0	0	0	0
118	USA	Jimmy Ma	468	2016/2017 season (70%)	0	0	0	0	0
119	JPN	Tatsuya Tsuboi	455	2018/2019 season (100%)	127	0	0	0	0
119	JPN	Tatsuya Tsuboi	455	2017/2018 season (100%)	0	164	164	0	0
119	JPN	Tatsuya Tsuboi	455	2016/2017 season (70%)	0	0	0	0	0
120	GER	Jonathan Hess	431	2018/2019 season (100%)	55	0	0	182	0
120	GER	Jonathan Hess	431	2017/2018 season (100%)	194	0	0	0	0
120	GER	Jonathan Hess	431	2016/2017 season (70%)	0	0	0	0	0
121	USA	Sean Rabbitt	416	2018/2019 season (100%)	0	0	0	160	0
121	USA	Sean Rabbitt	416	2017/2018 season (100%)	0	0	0	144	0
121	USA	Sean Rabbitt	416	2016/2017 season (70%)	0	0	0	112	0
122	MON	Davide Lewton Brain	414	2018/2019 season (100%)	74	0	0	225	0
122	MON	Davide Lewton Brain	414	2017/2018 season (100%)	0	0	0	0	0
122	MON	Davide Lewton Brain	414	2016/2017 season (70%)	0	0	0	115	0
123	PHI	Michael Christian Martinez	409	2018/2019 season (100%)	0	0	0	0	0
123	PHI	Michael Christian Martinez	409	2017/2018 season (100%)	0	0	0	144	0
123	PHI	Michael Christian Martinez	409	2016/2017 season (70%)	150	0	0	115	0
124	RUS	Kirill Iakovlev	407	2018/2019 season (100%)	0	225	182	0	0
124	RUS	Kirill Iakovlev	407	2017/2018 season (100%)	0	0	0	0	0
124	RUS	Kirill Iakovlev	407	2016/2017 season (70%)	0	0	0	0	0
125	HUN	Alexander Borovoj	406	2018/2019 season (100%)	0	0	0	203	0
125	HUN	Alexander Borovoj	406	2017/2018 season (100%)	0	0	0	203	0
125	HUN	Alexander Borovoj	406	2016/2017 season (70%)	0	0	0	0	0
126	RUS	Andrei Mozalev	398	2018/2019 season (100%)	0	250	148	0	0
126	RUS	Andrei Mozalev	398	2017/2018 season (100%)	0	0	0	0	0
126	RUS	Andrei Mozalev	398	2016/2017 season (70%)	0	0	0	0	0
127	KOR	Cha Young-hyun	396	2018/2019 season (100%)	68	133	120	0	0
127	KOR	Cha Young-hyun	396	2017/2018 season (100%)	75	0	0	0	0
127	KOR	Cha Young-hyun	396	2016/2017 season (70%)	0	0	0	0	0
128	KOR	Kim Jin-seo	392	2018/2019 season (100%)	0	0	0	0	0
128	KOR	Kim Jin-seo	392	2017/2018 season (100%)	0	0	0	0	0
128	KOR	Kim Jin-seo	392	2016/2017 season (70%)	109	0	0	158	125
129	SWE	Nikolaj Majorov	370	2018/2019 season (100%)	61	133	108	0	0
129	SWE	Nikolaj Majorov	370	2017/2018 season (100%)	0	0	0	0	0
129	SWE	Nikolaj Majorov	370	2016/2017 season (70%)	0	68	0	0	0
130	BLR	Alexander Lebedev	367	2018/2019 season (100%)	0	0	0	203	164
130	BLR	Alexander Lebedev	367	2017/2018 season (100%)	0	0	0	0	0
130	BLR	Alexander Lebedev	367	2016/2017 season (70%)	0	0	0	0	0
131	RUS	Artem Kovalev	356	2018/2019 season (100%)	0	148	0	0	0
131	RUS	Artem Kovalev	356	2017/2018 season (100%)	0	0	0	0	0
131	RUS	Artem Kovalev	356	2016/2017 season (70%)	0	104	104	0	0
132	SUI	Nurullah Sahaka	353	2018/2019 season (100%)	0	0	0	0	0
132	SUI	Nurullah Sahaka	353	2017/2018 season (100%)	103	0	0	250	0
132	SUI	Nurullah Sahaka	353	2016/2017 season (70%)	0	0	0	0	0
133	GER	Catalin Dimitrescu	346	2018/2019 season (100%)	0	0	0	182	164
133	GER	Catalin Dimitrescu	346	2017/2018 season (100%)	0	0	0	0	0
133	GER	Catalin Dimitrescu	346	2016/2017 season (70%)	0	0	0	0	0
134	RUS	Artem Lezheev	340	2018/2019 season (100%)	0	0	0	198	0
134	RUS	Artem Lezheev	340	2017/2018 season (100%)	0	0	0	0	0
134	RUS	Artem Lezheev	340	2016/2017 season (70%)	0	0	0	142	0
135	CAN	Iliya Kovler	336	2018/2019 season (100%)	0	203	133	0	0
135	CAN	Iliya Kovler	336	2017/2018 season (100%)	0	0	0	0	0
135	CAN	Iliya Kovler	336	2016/2017 season (70%)	0	0	0	0	0
135	RUS	Egor Rukhin	336	2018/2019 season (100%)	0	133	0	0	0
135	RUS	Egor Rukhin	336	2017/2018 season (100%)	0	203	0	0	0
135	RUS	Egor Rukhin	336	2016/2017 season (70%)	0	0	0	0	0
137	SVK	Michael Neuman	328	2018/2019 season (100%)	0	0	0	164	0
137	SVK	Michael Neuman	328	2017/2018 season (100%)	0	0	0	164	0
137	SVK	Michael Neuman	328	2016/2017 season (70%)	0	0	0	0	0
138	CAN	Bennet Toman	317	2018/2019 season (100%)	0	0	0	178	0
138	CAN	Bennet Toman	317	2017/2018 season (100%)	0	0	0	0	0
138	CAN	Bennet Toman	317	2016/2017 season (70%)	0	0	0	139	0
139	RUS	Ilia Skirda	316	2018/2019 season (100%)	0	0	0	0	0
139	RUS	Ilia Skirda	316	2017/2018 season (100%)	0	0	0	0	0
139	RUS	Ilia Skirda	316	2016/2017 season (70%)	0	158	158	0	0
140	CHN	Zhang He	299	2018/2019 season (100%)	173	0	0	0	0
140	CHN	Zhang He	299	2017/2018 season (100%)	126	0	0	0	0
140	CHN	Zhang He	299	2016/2017 season (70%)	0	0	0	0	0
141	ITA	Adrien Bannister	297	2018/2019 season (100%)	0	0	0	0	0
141	ITA	Adrien Bannister	297	2017/2018 season (100%)	0	0	0	182	0
141	ITA	Adrien Bannister	297	2016/2017 season (70%)	0	0	0	115	0
141	JPN	Daisuke Murakami	297	2018/2019 season (100%)	0	0	0	0	0
141	JPN	Daisuke Murakami	297	2017/2018 season (100%)	0	0	0	144	0
141	JPN	Daisuke Murakami	297	2016/2017 season (70%)	0	0	0	153	0
143	GBR	Harry Mattick	290	2018/2019 season (100%)	0	0	0	0	0
143	GBR	Harry Mattick	290	2017/2018 season (100%)	0	0	0	0	0
143	GBR	Harry Mattick	290	2016/2017 season (70%)	0	0	0	175	115
144	ITA	Dario Betti	284	2018/2019 season (100%)	0	0	0	0	0
144	ITA	Dario Betti	284	2017/2018 season (100%)	0	0	0	0	0
144	ITA	Dario Betti	284	2016/2017 season (70%)	0	0	0	142	142
145	FRA	Maxence Collet	279	2018/2019 season (100%)	0	0	0	0	0
145	FRA	Maxence Collet	279	2017/2018 season (100%)	0	97	0	182	0
145	FRA	Maxence Collet	279	2016/2017 season (70%)	0	0	0	0	0
146	CAN	Aleksa Rakic	268	2018/2019 season (100%)	0	148	120	0	0
146	CAN	Aleksa Rakic	268	2017/2018 season (100%)	0	0	0	0	0
146	CAN	Aleksa Rakic	268	2016/2017 season (70%)	0	0	0	0	0
147	ESP	Felipe Montoya	255	2018/2019 season (100%)	0	0	0	0	0
147	ESP	Felipe Montoya	255	2017/2018 season (100%)	113	0	0	0	0
147	ESP	Felipe Montoya	255	2016/2017 season (70%)	0	0	0	142	0
148	AUS	James Min	252	2018/2019 season (100%)	0	0	0	144	0
148	AUS	James Min	252	2017/2018 season (100%)	0	108	0	0	0
148	AUS	James Min	252	2016/2017 season (70%)	0	0	0	0	0
149	KOR	Byun Se-jong	243	2018/2019 season (100%)	0	0	0	243	0
149	KOR	Byun Se-jong	243	2017/2018 season (100%)	0	0	0	0	0
149	KOR	Byun Se-jong	243	2016/2017 season (70%)	0	0	0	0	0
150	ITA	Alberto Vanz	242	2018/2019 season (100%)	0	0	0	0	0
150	ITA	Alberto Vanz	242	2017/2018 season (100%)	0	0	0	0	0
150	ITA	Alberto Vanz	242	2016/2017 season (70%)	0	0	0	127	115
151	CHN	Hao Yan	240	2018/2019 season (100%)	0	0	0	0	0
151	CHN	Hao Yan	240	2017/2018 season (100%)	0	120	120	0	0
151	CHN	Hao Yan	240	2016/2017 season (70%)	0	0	0	0	0
152	NED	Thomas Kennes	225	2018/2019 season (100%)	0	0	0	0	0
152	NED	Thomas Kennes	225	2017/2018 season (100%)	0	0	0	225	0
152	NED	Thomas Kennes	225	2016/2017 season (70%)	0	0	0	0	0
152	CZE	Daniel Mrázek	225	2018/2019 season (100%)	0	0	0	225	0
152	CZE	Daniel Mrázek	225	2017/2018 season (100%)	0	0	0	0	0
152	CZE	Daniel Mrázek	225	2016/2017 season (70%)	0	0	0	0	0
154	RUS	Vladimir Samoilov	225	2018/2019 season (100%)	0	0	0	0	0
154	RUS	Vladimir Samoilov	225	2017/2018 season (100%)	0	225	0	0	0
154	RUS	Vladimir Samoilov	225	2016/2017 season (70%)	0	0	0	0	0
155	EST	Samuel Koppel	216	2018/2019 season (100%)	0	0	0	0	0
155	EST	Samuel Koppel	216	2017/2018 season (100%)	0	0	0	0	0
155	EST	Samuel Koppel	216	2016/2017 season (70%)	0	0	0	115	101
155	SWE	Andreas Nordebäck	216	2018/2019 season (100%)	0	108	108	0	0
155	SWE	Andreas Nordebäck	216	2017/2018 season (100%)	0	0	0	0	0
155	SWE	Andreas Nordebäck	216	2016/2017 season (70%)	0	0	0	0	0
155	CRO	Nicholas Vrdoljak	216	2018/2019 season (100%)	0	0	0	0	0
155	CRO	Nicholas Vrdoljak	216	2017/2018 season (100%)	0	0	0	0	0
155	CRO	Nicholas Vrdoljak	216	2016/2017 season (70%)	0	0	0	115	101
158	USA	Eric Sjoberg	213	2018/2019 season (100%)	0	0	0	0	0
158	USA	Eric Sjoberg	213	2017/2018 season (100%)	0	120	0	0	0
158	USA	Eric Sjoberg	213	2016/2017 season (70%)	0	93	0	0	0
159	FRA	Philip Warren	203	2018/2019 season (100%)	0	0	0	0	0
159	FRA	Philip Warren	203	2017/2018 season (100%)	0	0	0	203	0
159	FRA	Philip Warren	203	2016/2017 season (70%)	0	0	0	0	0
160	TPE	Micah Tang	192	2018/2019 season (100%)	140	0	0	0	0
160	TPE	Micah Tang	192	2017/2018 season (100%)	0	0	0	0	0
160	TPE	Micah Tang	192	2016/2017 season (70%)	52	0	0	0	0
161	POL	Krzysztof Gala	182	2018/2019 season (100%)	0	0	0	0	0
161	POL	Krzysztof Gala	182	2017/2018 season (100%)	0	0	0	182	0
161	POL	Krzysztof Gala	182	2016/2017 season (70%)	0	0	0	0	0
161	FIN	Roman Galay	182	2018/2019 season (100%)	0	0	0	182	0
161	FIN	Roman Galay	182	2017/2018 season (100%)	0	0	0	0	0
161	FIN	Roman Galay	182	2016/2017 season (70%)	0	0	0	0	0
161	IRL	Conor Stakelum	182	2018/2019 season (100%)	0	0	0	182	0
161	IRL	Conor Stakelum	182	2017/2018 season (100%)	0	0	0	0	0
161	IRL	Conor Stakelum	182	2016/2017 season (70%)	0	0	0	0	0
161	JPN	Jun Suzuki	182	2018/2019 season (100%)	0	0	0	0	0
161	JPN	Jun Suzuki	182	2017/2018 season (100%)	0	0	0	182	0
161	JPN	Jun Suzuki	182	2016/2017 season (70%)	0	0	0	0	0
161	BUL	Alexander Zlatkov	182	2018/2019 season (100%)	0	0	0	182	0
161	BUL	Alexander Zlatkov	182	2017/2018 season (100%)	0	0	0	0	0
161	BUL	Alexander Zlatkov	182	2016/2017 season (70%)	0	0	0	0	0
166	SWE	Gabriel Folkesson	175	2018/2019 season (100%)	0	0	0	0	0
166	SWE	Gabriel Folkesson	175	2017/2018 season (100%)	55	120	0	0	0
166	SWE	Gabriel Folkesson	175	2016/2017 season (70%)	0	0	0	0	0
166	THA	Micah Kai Lynette	175	2018/2019 season (100%)	126	0	0	0	0
166	THA	Micah Kai Lynette	175	2017/2018 season (100%)	49	0	0	0	0
166	THA	Micah Kai Lynette	175	2016/2017 season (70%)	0	0	0	0	0
166	ITA	Marco Zandron	175	2018/2019 season (100%)	0	0	0	0	0
166	ITA	Marco Zandron	175	2017/2018 season (100%)	0	0	0	0	0
166	ITA	Marco Zandron	175	2016/2017 season (70%)	0	0	0	175	0
169	MAS	Chew Kai Xiang	166	2018/2019 season (100%)	0	0	0	0	0
169	MAS	Chew Kai Xiang	166	2017/2018 season (100%)	0	108	0	0	0
169	MAS	Chew Kai Xiang	166	2016/2017 season (70%)	58	0	0	0	0
169	HKG	Leslie Man Cheuk Ip	166	2018/2019 season (100%)	92	0	0	0	0
169	HKG	Leslie Man Cheuk Ip	166	2017/2018 season (100%)	74	0	0	0	0
169	HKG	Leslie Man Cheuk Ip	166	2016/2017 season (70%)	64	0	0	0	0
171	TUR	Engin Ali Artan	164	2018/2019 season (100%)	0	0	0	0	0
171	TUR	Engin Ali Artan	164	2017/2018 season (100%)	0	0	0	164	0
171	TUR	Engin Ali Artan	164	2016/2017 season (70%)	0	0	0	0	0
171	POL	Lukasz Kedzierski	164	2018/2019 season (100%)	0	0	0	0	0
171	POL	Lukasz Kedzierski	164	2017/2018 season (100%)	0	0	0	164	0
171	POL	Lukasz Kedzierski	164	2016/2017 season (70%)	0	0	0	0	0
171	SVK	Marco Klepoch	164	2018/2019 season (100%)	0	0	0	0	0
171	SVK	Marco Klepoch	164	2017/2018 season (100%)	0	0	0	164	0
171	SVK	Marco Klepoch	164	2016/2017 season (70%)	0	0	0	0	0
171	FRA	Landry Le May	164	2018/2019 season (100%)	0	0	0	0	0
171	FRA	Landry Le May	164	2017/2018 season (100%)	0	0	0	164	0
171	FRA	Landry Le May	164	2016/2017 season (70%)	0	0	0	0	0
171	SWE	Illya Solomin	164	2018/2019 season (100%)	0	0	0	0	0
171	SWE	Illya Solomin	164	2017/2018 season (100%)	0	0	0	164	0
171	SWE	Illya Solomin	164	2016/2017 season (70%)	0	0	0	0	0
176	KOR	Park Sung-hoon	160	2018/2019 season (100%)	0	0	0	160	0
176	KOR	Park Sung-hoon	160	2017/2018 season (100%)	0	0	0	0	0
176	KOR	Park Sung-hoon	160	2016/2017 season (70%)	0	0	0	0	0
177	CHN	Li Tangxu	158	2018/2019 season (100%)	0	0	0	0	0
177	CHN	Li Tangxu	158	2017/2018 season (100%)	0	0	0	0	0
177	CHN	Li Tangxu	158	2016/2017 season (70%)	43	115	0	0	0
177	USA	Jordan Moeller	158	2018/2019 season (100%)	0	0	0	0	0
177	USA	Jordan Moeller	158	2017/2018 season (100%)	0	0	0	0	0
177	USA	Jordan Moeller	158	2016/2017 season (70%)	0	0	0	158	0
179	RUS	Pavel Vyugov	153	2018/2019 season (100%)	0	0	0	0	0
179	RUS	Pavel Vyugov	153	2017/2018 season (100%)	0	0	0	0	0
179	RUS	Pavel Vyugov	153	2016/2017 season (70%)	0	0	0	153	0
180	RUS	Evgeni Semenenko	148	2018/2019 season (100%)	0	0	0	0	0
180	RUS	Evgeni Semenenko	148	2017/2018 season (100%)	0	148	0	0	0
180	RUS	Evgeni Semenenko	148	2016/2017 season (70%)	0	0	0	0	0
180	RUS	Matvei Vetlugin	148	2018/2019 season (100%)	0	148	0	0	0
180	RUS	Matvei Vetlugin	148	2017/2018 season (100%)	0	0	0	0	0
180	RUS	Matvei Vetlugin	148	2016/2017 season (70%)	0	0	0	0	0
182	JPN	Shu Nakamura	142	2018/2019 season (100%)	0	0	0	0	0
182	JPN	Shu Nakamura	142	2017/2018 season (100%)	0	0	0	0	0
182	JPN	Shu Nakamura	142	2016/2017 season (70%)	0	0	0	142	0
183	RUS	Gordei Gorshkov	139	2018/2019 season (100%)	0	0	0	0	0
183	RUS	Gordei Gorshkov	139	2017/2018 season (100%)	0	0	0	0	0
183	RUS	Gordei Gorshkov	139	2016/2017 season (70%)	0	0	0	139	0
184	CHN	Fang Shuai	133	2018/2019 season (100%)	0	0	0	0	0
184	CHN	Fang Shuai	133	2017/2018 season (100%)	0	133	0	0	0
184	CHN	Fang Shuai	133	2016/2017 season (70%)	0	0	0	0	0
185	CZE	Tomáš Kupk	127	2018/2019 season (100%)	0	0	0	0	0
185	CZE	Tomáš Kupk	127	2017/2018 season (100%)	0	0	0	0	0
185	CZE	Tomáš Kupk	127	2016/2017 season (70%)	0	0	0	127	0
185	RUS	Murad Kurbanov	127	2018/2019 season (100%)	0	0	0	0	0
185	RUS	Murad Kurbanov	127	2017/2018 season (100%)	0	0	0	0	0
185	RUS	Murad Kurbanov	127	2016/2017 season (70%)	0	0	0	127	0
187	CAN	Beres Clements	120	2018/2019 season (100%)	0	120	0	0	0
187	CAN	Beres Clements	120	2017/2018 season (100%)	0	0	0	0	0
187	CAN	Beres Clements	120	2016/2017 season (70%)	0	0	0	0	0
187	CZE	Radek Jakubka	120	2018/2019 season (100%)	0	120	0	0	0
187	CZE	Radek Jakubka	120	2017/2018 season (100%)	0	0	0	0	0
187	CZE	Radek Jakubka	120	2016/2017 season (70%)	0	0	0	0	0
187	USA	Maxim Naumov	120	2018/2019 season (100%)	0	0	0	0	0
187	USA	Maxim Naumov	120	2017/2018 season (100%)	0	120	0	0	0
187	USA	Maxim Naumov	120	2016/2017 season (70%)	0	0	0	0	0
190	KOR	Kyeong Jae-seok	108	2018/2019 season (100%)	0	108	0	0	0
190	KOR	Kyeong Jae-seok	108	2017/2018 season (100%)	0	0	0	0	0
190	KOR	Kyeong Jae-seok	108	2016/2017 season (70%)	0	0	0	0	0
191	ITA	Nik Folini	97	2018/2019 season (100%)	0	0	0	0	0
191	ITA	Nik Folini	97	2017/2018 season (100%)	0	97	0	0	0
191	ITA	Nik Folini	97	2016/2017 season (70%)	0	0	0	0	0
191	USA	Dinh Tran	97	2018/2019 season (100%)	0	97	0	0	0
191	USA	Dinh Tran	97	2017/2018 season (100%)	0	0	0	0	0
191	USA	Dinh Tran	97	2016/2017 season (70%)	0	0	0	0	0
191	JPN	Taichiro Yamakuma	97	2018/2019 season (100%)	0	0	0	0	0
191	JPN	Taichiro Yamakuma	97	2017/2018 season (100%)	0	97	0	0	0
191	JPN	Taichiro Yamakuma	97	2016/2017 season (70%)	0	0	0	0	0
194	PRK	Han Kum-chol	93	2018/2019 season (100%)	0	0	0	0	0
194	PRK	Han Kum-chol	93	2017/2018 season (100%)	0	0	0	0	0
194	PRK	Han Kum-chol	93	2016/2017 season (70%)	0	93	0	0	0
194	USA	Kevin Shum	93	2018/2019 season (100%)	0	0	0	0	0
194	USA	Kevin Shum	93	2017/2018 season (100%)	0	0	0	0	0
194	USA	Kevin Shum	93	2016/2017 season (70%)	0	93	0	0	0
196	CHN	Li Yuheng	84	2018/2019 season (100%)	0	0	0	0	0
196	CHN	Li Yuheng	84	2017/2018 season (100%)	0	0	0	0	0
196	CHN	Li Yuheng	84	2016/2017 season (70%)	0	84	0	0	0
197	KAZ	Nikita Manko	83	2018/2019 season (100%)	83	0	0	0	0
197	KAZ	Nikita Manko	83	2017/2018 season (100%)	0	0	0	0	0
197	KAZ	Nikita Manko	83	2016/2017 season (70%)	0	0	0	0	0
198	CAN	Edrian Paul Celestino	76	2018/2019 season (100%)	0	0	0	0	0
198	CAN	Edrian Paul Celestino	76	2017/2018 season (100%)	0	0	0	0	0
198	CAN	Edrian Paul Celestino	76	2016/2017 season (70%)	0	76	0	0	0
198	USA	William Hubbart	76	2018/2019 season (100%)	0	0	0	0	0
198	USA	William Hubbart	76	2017/2018 season (100%)	0	0	0	0	0
198	USA	William Hubbart	76	2016/2017 season (70%)	0	76	0	0	0
198	USA	Oleksiy Melnyk	76	2018/2019 season (100%)	0	0	0	0	0
198	USA	Oleksiy Melnyk	76	2017/2018 season (100%)	0	0	0	0	0
198	USA	Oleksiy Melnyk	76	2016/2017 season (70%)	0	76	0	0	0
201	GER	Nikita Starostin	84	2018/2019 season (100%)	44	0	0	0	0
201	GER	Nikita Starostin	84	2017/2018 season (100%)	0	0	0	0	0
201	GER	Nikita Starostin	84	2016/2017 season (70%)	0	0	0	0	0

=== Ladies' singles ===
As of April 9, 2019.

Rank	Nation	Skater	Points	Season	ISU Championships or Olympics	(Junior) Grand Prix and Final		Selected International Competition	
Rank	Nation	Skater	Points	Season	Best	Best	2nd Best	Best	2nd Best
1	RUS	Alina Zagitova	5320	2018/2019 season (100%)	1200	720	400	300	0
1	RUS	Alina Zagitova	5320	2017/2018 season (100%)	1200	800	400	300	0
1	RUS	Alina Zagitova	5320	2016/2017 season (70%)	350	245	175	0	0
2	JPN	Satoko Miyahara	4342	2018/2019 season (100%)	709	472	400	300	250
2	JPN	Satoko Miyahara	4342	2017/2018 season (100%)	972	525	400	0	0
2	JPN	Satoko Miyahara	4342	2016/2017 season (70%)	0	504	252	210	0
3	RUS	Evgenia Medvedeva	4306	2018/2019 season (100%)	972	324	292	270	0
3	RUS	Evgenia Medvedeva	4306	2017/2018 season (100%)	1080	400	400	300	0
3	RUS	Evgenia Medvedeva	4306	2016/2017 season (70%)	840	560	280	0	0
4	CAN	Kaetlyn Osmond	4174	2018/2019 season (100%)	0	0	0	0	0
4	CAN	Kaetlyn Osmond	4174	2017/2018 season (100%)	1200	648	400	300	0
4	CAN	Kaetlyn Osmond	4174	2016/2017 season (70%)	756	408	252	210	0
5	JPN	Kaori Sakamoto	3886	2018/2019 season (100%)	787	583	360	219	0
5	JPN	Kaori Sakamoto	3886	2017/2018 season (100%)	840	360	262	250	225
5	JPN	Kaori Sakamoto	3886	2016/2017 season (70%)	284	199	175	0	0
6	JPN	Mai Mihara	3672	2018/2019 season (100%)	680	360	292	270	0
6	JPN	Mai Mihara	3672	2017/2018 season (100%)	756	292	292	270	250
6	JPN	Mai Mihara	3672	2016/2017 season (70%)	588	227	204	210	0
7	JPN	Wakaba Higuchi	3601	2018/2019 season (100%)	0	236	0	203	198
7	JPN	Wakaba Higuchi	3601	2017/2018 season (100%)	1080	472	360	270	250
7	JPN	Wakaba Higuchi	3601	2016/2017 season (70%)	293	227	204	210	0
8	KAZ	Elizabet Tursynbaeva	3532	2018/2019 season (100%)	1080	262	236	270	270
8	KAZ	Elizabet Tursynbaeva	3532	2017/2018 season (100%)	418	262	191	300	243
8	KAZ	Elizabet Tursynbaeva	3532	2016/2017 season (70%)	362	183	134	170	112
9	RUS	Maria Sotskova	3448	2018/2019 season (100%)	0	213	0	198	0
9	RUS	Maria Sotskova	3448	2017/2018 season (100%)	612	720	360	300	0
9	RUS	Maria Sotskova	3448	2016/2017 season (70%)	428	368	252	210	0
10	USA	Bradie Tennell	3356	2018/2019 season (100%)	638	324	292	300	300
10	USA	Bradie Tennell	3356	2017/2018 season (100%)	709	324	0	250	219
10	USA	Bradie Tennell	3356	2016/2017 season (70%)	186	0	0	170	0
11	JPN	Rika Kihira	3344	2018/2019 season (100%)	875	800	400	300	250
11	JPN	Rika Kihira	3344	2017/2018 season (100%)	239	255	225	0	0
11	JPN	Rika Kihira	3344	2016/2017 season (70%)	0	178	175	0	0
12	ITA	Carolina Kostner	3212	2018/2019 season (100%)	0	0	0	0	0
12	ITA	Carolina Kostner	3212	2017/2018 season (100%)	875	583	360	270	243
12	ITA	Carolina Kostner	3212	2016/2017 season (70%)	496	0	0	210	175
13	RUS	Stanislava Konstantinova	3022	2018/2019 season (100%)	612	360	262	243	219
13	RUS	Stanislava Konstantinova	3022	2017/2018 season (100%)	365	203	0	300	300
13	RUS	Stanislava Konstantinova	3022	2016/2017 season (70%)	207	158	127	210	0
14	USA	Mariah Bell	2959	2018/2019 season (100%)	517	292	262	243	219
14	USA	Mariah Bell	2959	2017/2018 season (100%)	551	236	0	198	0
14	USA	Mariah Bell	2959	2016/2017 season (70%)	347	252	0	189	170
15	CAN	Gabrielle Daleman	2724	2018/2019 season (100%)	418	0	0	178	0
15	CAN	Gabrielle Daleman	2724	2017/2018 season (100%)	638	236	236	178	0
15	CAN	Gabrielle Daleman	2724	2016/2017 season (70%)	680	204	204	170	0
16	RUS	Elizaveta Tuktamysheva	2574	2018/2019 season (100%)	0	648	400	300	300
16	RUS	Elizaveta Tuktamysheva	2574	2017/2018 season (100%)	0	213	0	243	243
16	RUS	Elizaveta Tuktamysheva	2574	2016/2017 season (70%)	0	227	204	189	189
17	RUS	Sofia Samodurova	2495	2018/2019 season (100%)	840	525	360	270	0
17	RUS	Sofia Samodurova	2495	2017/2018 season (100%)	0	250	250	0	0
17	RUS	Sofia Samodurova	2495	2016/2017 season (70%)	0	127	0	0	0
18	JPN	Yuna Shiraiwa	2435	2018/2019 season (100%)	328	292	262	270	198
18	JPN	Yuna Shiraiwa	2435	2017/2018 season (100%)	0	236	191	225	203
18	JPN	Yuna Shiraiwa	2435	2016/2017 season (70%)	230	158	127	0	0
19	FRA	Laurine Lecavelier	2360	2018/2019 season (100%)	551	262	0	250	198
19	FRA	Laurine Lecavelier	2360	2017/2018 season (100%)	305	191	0	182	0
19	FRA	Laurine Lecavelier	2360	2016/2017 season (70%)	386	165	0	175	175
20	KOR	Lim Eun-soo	2330	2018/2019 season (100%)	465	324	236	300	270
20	KOR	Lim Eun-soo	2330	2017/2018 season (100%)	328	225	182	0	0
20	KOR	Lim Eun-soo	2330	2016/2017 season (70%)	256	142	127	0	0
21	USA	Karen Chen	2274	2018/2019 season (100%)	0	0	0	0	0
21	USA	Karen Chen	2274	2017/2018 season (100%)	418	213	191	243	0
21	USA	Karen Chen	2274	2016/2017 season (70%)	613	165	149	170	112
22	SUI	Alexia Paganini	2225	2018/2019 season (100%)	496	292	0	250	144
22	SUI	Alexia Paganini	2225	2017/2018 season (100%)	446	0	0	250	243
22	SUI	Alexia Paganini	2225	2016/2017 season (70%)	0	104	0	0	0
23	FIN	Viveca Lindfors	2176	2018/2019 season (100%)	680	191	0	243	243
23	FIN	Viveca Lindfors	2176	2017/2018 season (100%)	247	97	0	250	225
23	FIN	Viveca Lindfors	2176	2016/2017 season (70%)	89	0	0	0	0
24	RUS	Alexandra Trusova	2165	2018/2019 season (100%)	500	315	250	0	0
24	RUS	Alexandra Trusova	2165	2017/2018 season (100%)	500	350	250	0	0
24	RUS	Alexandra Trusova	2165	2016/2017 season (70%)	0	0	0	0	0
25	FRA	Maé-Bérénice Méité	2119	2018/2019 season (100%)	446	191	0	243	164
25	FRA	Maé-Bérénice Méité	2119	2017/2018 season (100%)	402	191	0	144	0
25	FRA	Maé-Bérénice Méité	2119	2016/2017 season (70%)	121	149	0	175	158
26	BEL	Loena Hendrickx	2099	2018/2019 season (100%)	377	262	0	243	0
26	BEL	Loena Hendrickx	2099	2017/2018 season (100%)	551	108	0	225	0
26	BEL	Loena Hendrickx	2099	2016/2017 season (70%)	312	0	0	175	158
27	USA	Mirai Nagasu	2066	2018/2019 season (100%)	0	0	0	0	0
27	USA	Mirai Nagasu	2066	2017/2018 season (100%)	465	292	0	270	0
27	USA	Mirai Nagasu	2066	2016/2017 season (70%)	476	183	0	210	170
28	JPN	Marin Honda	1947	2018/2019 season (100%)	0	236	191	178	0
28	JPN	Marin Honda	1947	2017/2018 season (100%)	0	262	262	300	203
28	JPN	Marin Honda	1947	2016/2017 season (70%)	315	158	158	0	0
29	JPN	Mako Yamashita	1892	2018/2019 season (100%)	0	360	213	243	243
29	JPN	Mako Yamashita	1892	2017/2018 season (100%)	405	225	203	0	0
29	JPN	Mako Yamashita	1892	2016/2017 season (70%)	0	142	142	0	0
30	JPN	Rika Hongo	1848	2018/2019 season (100%)	0	0	0	0	0
30	JPN	Rika Hongo	1848	2017/2018 season (100%)	0	236	213	270	225
30	JPN	Rika Hongo	1848	2016/2017 season (70%)	228	183	165	175	153
31	GER	Nicole Schott	1711	2018/2019 season (100%)	247	0	0	225	225
31	GER	Nicole Schott	1711	2017/2018 season (100%)	339	213	0	243	219
31	GER	Nicole Schott	1711	2016/2017 season (70%)	228	0	0	210	175
32	KOR	Choi Da-bin	1703	2018/2019 season (100%)	0	0	0	0	0
32	KOR	Choi Da-bin	1703	2017/2018 season (100%)	638	0	0	219	0
32	KOR	Choi Da-bin	1703	2016/2017 season (70%)	386	149	0	158	153
33	FIN	Emmi Peltonen	1684	2018/2019 season (100%)	402	0	0	198	0
33	FIN	Emmi Peltonen	1684	2017/2018 season (100%)	362	0	0	250	182
33	FIN	Emmi Peltonen	1684	2016/2017 season (70%)	205	115	0	175	125
34	SVK	Nicole Rajičová	1670	2018/2019 season (100%)	362	0	0	182	0
34	SVK	Nicole Rajičová	1670	2017/2018 season (100%)	496	0	0	182	160
34	SVK	Nicole Rajičová	1670	2016/2017 season (70%)	347	149	0	139	0
35	RUS	Alena Kostornaia	1615	2018/2019 season (100%)	0	350	250	0	0
35	RUS	Alena Kostornaia	1615	2017/2018 season (100%)	450	315	250	0	0
35	RUS	Alena Kostornaia	1615	2016/2017 season (70%)	0	0	0	0	0
36	USA	Starr Andrews	1561	2018/2019 season (100%)	0	213	0	225	225
36	USA	Starr Andrews	1561	2017/2018 season (100%)	446	164	0	178	0
36	USA	Starr Andrews	1561	2016/2017 season (70%)	110	0	0	0	0
37	RUS	Serafima Sakhanovich	1551	2018/2019 season (100%)	0	0	0	300	270
37	RUS	Serafima Sakhanovich	1551	2017/2018 season (100%)	0	262	0	300	270
37	RUS	Serafima Sakhanovich	1551	2016/2017 season (70%)	0	149	0	189	125
38	KOR	Kim Ha-nul	1528	2018/2019 season (100%)	237	213	0	0	0
38	KOR	Kim Ha-nul	1528	2017/2018 season (100%)	496	0	0	203	160
38	KOR	Kim Ha-nul	1528	2016/2017 season (70%)	0	115	104	0	0
39	CZE	Eliška Březinová	1517	2018/2019 season (100%)	325	0	0	250	203
39	CZE	Eliška Březinová	1517	2017/2018 season (100%)	264	0	0	250	225
39	CZE	Eliška Březinová	1517	2016/2017 season (70%)	0	0	0	127	115
40	CAN	Alaine Chartrand	1512	2018/2019 season (100%)	173	191	0	144	0
40	CAN	Alaine Chartrand	1512	2017/2018 season (100%)	402	0	0	198	0
40	CAN	Alaine Chartrand	1512	2016/2017 season (70%)	205	183	0	189	0
41	RUS	Elena Radionova	1469	2018/2019 season (100%)	0	0	0	0	0
41	RUS	Elena Radionova	1469	2017/2018 season (100%)	0	324	292	243	0
41	RUS	Elena Radionova	1469	2016/2017 season (70%)	0	330	280	0	0
42	USA	Courtney Hicks	1457	2018/2019 season (100%)	0	191	0	160	0
42	USA	Courtney Hicks	1457	2017/2018 season (100%)	0	292	0	243	219
42	USA	Courtney Hicks	1457	2016/2017 season (70%)	0	227	0	125	0
43	HUN	Ivett Toth	1443	2018/2019 season (100%)	237	0	0	250	250
43	HUN	Ivett Toth	1443	2017/2018 season (100%)	237	0	0	250	0
43	HUN	Ivett Toth	1443	2016/2017 season (70%)	281	0	0	175	158
44	SWE	Anita Östlund	1442	2018/2019 season (100%)	140	0	0	225	164
44	SWE	Anita Östlund	1442	2017/2018 season (100%)	156	133	108	225	198
44	SWE	Anita Östlund	1442	2016/2017 season (70%)	99	93	0	158	142
45	RUS	Anna Pogorilaya	1433	2018/2019 season (100%)	0	0	0	0	0
45	RUS	Anna Pogorilaya	1433	2017/2018 season (100%)	0	0	0	0	0
45	RUS	Anna Pogorilaya	1433	2016/2017 season (70%)	529	454	280	170	0
46	KOR	Kim Ye-lim	1425	2018/2019 season (100%)	402	225	225	243	0
46	KOR	Kim Ye-lim	1425	2017/2018 season (100%)	0	182	148	0	0
46	KOR	Kim Ye-lim	1425	2016/2017 season (70%)	0	127	115	0	0
47	USA	Ting Cui	1386	2018/2019 season (100%)	405	164	133	270	0
47	USA	Ting Cui	1386	2017/2018 season (100%)	266	148	0	0	0
47	USA	Ting Cui	1386	2016/2017 season (70%)	0	0	0	0	0
48	AUS	Kailani Craine	1383	2018/2019 season (100%)	192	0	0	225	219
48	AUS	Kailani Craine	1383	2017/2018 season (100%)	222	0	0	300	225
48	AUS	Kailani Craine	1383	2016/2017 season (70%)	121	0	0	189	142
49	RUS	Polina Tsurskaya	1375	2018/2019 season (100%)	0	213	191	219	0
49	RUS	Polina Tsurskaya	1375	2017/2018 season (100%)	0	324	292	0	0
49	RUS	Polina Tsurskaya	1375	2016/2017 season (70%)	136	175	175	0	0
50	RUS	Alena Leonova	1355	2018/2019 season (100%)	0	213	0	0	0
50	RUS	Alena Leonova	1355	2017/2018 season (100%)	0	236	213	198	198
50	RUS	Alena Leonova	1355	2016/2017 season (70%)	0	0	0	170	127
51	HKG	Yi Christy Leung	1300	2018/2019 season (100%)	305	182	133	219	219
51	HKG	Yi Christy Leung	1300	2017/2018 season (100%)	174	0	0	0	0
51	HKG	Yi Christy Leung	1300	2016/2017 season (70%)	151	68	0	0	0
52	KOR	You Young	1241	2018/2019 season (100%)	295	203	182	0	0
52	KOR	You Young	1241	2017/2018 season (100%)	215	182	164	0	0
52	KOR	You Young	1241	2016/2017 season (70%)	0	0	0	0	0
53	USA	Ashley Wagner	1216	2018/2019 season (100%)	0	0	0	0	0
53	USA	Ashley Wagner	1216	2017/2018 season (100%)	0	324	0	0	0
53	USA	Ashley Wagner	1216	2016/2017 season (70%)	447	280	165	0	0
54	GER	Lea Johanna Dastich	1193	2018/2019 season (100%)	0	0	0	0	0
54	GER	Lea Johanna Dastich	1193	2017/2018 season (100%)	194	148	120	178	160
54	GER	Lea Johanna Dastich	1193	2016/2017 season (70%)	167	84	0	142	0
55	ITA	Elisabetta Leccardi	1160	2018/2019 season (100%)	0	0	0	203	0
55	ITA	Elisabetta Leccardi	1160	2017/2018 season (100%)	146	97	97	250	225
55	ITA	Elisabetta Leccardi	1160	2016/2017 season (70%)	58	84	0	0	0
56	SLO	Daša Grm	1152	2018/2019 season (100%)	200	0	0	182	164
56	SLO	Daša Grm	1152	2017/2018 season (100%)	131	0	0	250	225
56	SLO	Daša Grm	1152	2016/2017 season (70%)	0	0	0	142	142
57	USA	Angela Wang	1125	2018/2019 season (100%)	0	0	0	144	0
57	USA	Angela Wang	1125	2017/2018 season (100%)	362	0	0	225	219
57	USA	Angela Wang	1125	2016/2017 season (70%)	0	0	0	175	0
58	BUL	Alexandra Feigin	1103	2018/2019 season (100%)	293	120	0	250	250
58	BUL	Alexandra Feigin	1103	2017/2018 season (100%)	114	0	0	0	0
58	BUL	Alexandra Feigin	1103	2016/2017 season (70%)	0	76	0	0	0
59	AUS	Brooklee Han	1102	2018/2019 season (100%)	0	0	0	243	0
59	AUS	Brooklee Han	1102	2017/2018 season (100%)	214	0	0	160	160
59	AUS	Brooklee Han	1102	2016/2017 season (70%)	150	0	0	175	0
60	GBR	Natasha McKay	1097	2018/2019 season (100%)	146	0	0	250	0
60	GBR	Natasha McKay	1097	2017/2018 season (100%)	0	0	0	225	203
60	GBR	Natasha McKay	1097	2016/2017 season (70%)	98	0	0	175	175
61	BRA	Isadora Williams	1085	2018/2019 season (100%)	156	0	0	225	164
61	BRA	Isadora Williams	1085	2017/2018 season (100%)	106	0	0	225	198
61	BRA	Isadora Williams	1085	2016/2017 season (70%)	0	0	0	175	158
62	RUS	Anastasiia Gubanova	1067	2018/2019 season (100%)	0	0	0	270	219
62	RUS	Anastasiia Gubanova	1067	2017/2018 season (100%)	0	182	0	0	0
62	RUS	Anastasiia Gubanova	1067	2016/2017 season (70%)	0	221	175	0	0
63	AZE	Ekaterina Ryabova	1063	2018/2019 season (100%)	339	148	148	250	178
63	AZE	Ekaterina Ryabova	1063	2017/2018 season (100%)	0	0	0	0	0
63	AZE	Ekaterina Ryabova	1063	2016/2017 season (70%)	0	0	0	0	0
64	KOR	Park So-youn	1046	2018/2019 season (100%)	0	0	0	144	0
64	KOR	Park So-youn	1046	2017/2018 season (100%)	293	0	0	0	0
64	KOR	Park So-youn	1046	2016/2017 season (70%)	0	183	134	153	139
65	RUS	Anastasia Tarakanova	1039	2018/2019 season (100%)	0	255	250	0	0
65	RUS	Anastasia Tarakanova	1039	2017/2018 season (100%)	0	284	250	0	0
65	RUS	Anastasia Tarakanova	1039	2016/2017 season (70%)	0	0	0	0	0
66	GER	Nathalie Weinzierl	1029	2018/2019 season (100%)	102	0	0	160	0
66	GER	Nathalie Weinzierl	1029	2017/2018 season (100%)	0	0	0	250	250
66	GER	Nathalie Weinzierl	1029	2016/2017 season (70%)	109	0	0	158	142
67	JPN	Yuhana Yokoi	1025	2018/2019 season (100%)	215	203	148	0	0
67	JPN	Yuhana Yokoi	1025	2017/2018 season (100%)	295	164	0	0	0
67	JPN	Yuhana Yokoi	1025	2016/2017 season (70%)	0	0	0	0	0
68	ITA	Roberta Rodeghiero	1001	2018/2019 season (100%)	0	0	0	182	178
68	ITA	Roberta Rodeghiero	1001	2017/2018 season (100%)	0	0	0	0	0
68	ITA	Roberta Rodeghiero	1001	2016/2017 season (70%)	253	134	0	153	101
69	SWE	Matilda Algotsson	998	2018/2019 season (100%)	0	0	0	164	0
69	SWE	Matilda Algotsson	998	2017/2018 season (100%)	0	0	0	270	203
69	SWE	Matilda Algotsson	998	2016/2017 season (70%)	166	68	0	127	127
70	ITA	Micol Cristini	994	2018/2019 season (100%)	0	0	0	144	0
70	ITA	Micol Cristini	994	2017/2018 season (100%)	192	0	0	250	250
70	ITA	Micol Cristini	994	2016/2017 season (70%)	0	0	0	158	142
71	ROU	Julia Sauter	970	2018/2019 season (100%)	214	0	0	225	164
71	ROU	Julia Sauter	970	2017/2018 season (100%)	0	0	0	203	164
71	ROU	Julia Sauter	970	2016/2017 season (70%)	0	0	0	142	0
72	ITA	Giada Russo	959	2018/2019 season (100%)	0	0	0	0	0
72	ITA	Giada Russo	959	2017/2018 season (100%)	126	0	0	250	250
72	ITA	Giada Russo	959	2016/2017 season (70%)	0	0	0	175	158
73	CHN	Li Xiangning	954	2018/2019 season (100%)	0	0	0	0	0
73	CHN	Li Xiangning	954	2017/2018 season (100%)	325	191	0	225	0
73	CHN	Li Xiangning	954	2016/2017 season (70%)	213	0	0	0	0
74	RUS	Anna Shcherbakova	950	2018/2019 season (100%)	450	250	250	0	0
74	RUS	Anna Shcherbakova	950	2017/2018 season (100%)	0	0	0	0	0
74	RUS	Anna Shcherbakova	950	2016/2017 season (70%)	0	0	0	0	0
75	ARM	Anastasia Galustyan	948	2018/2019 season (100%)	92	0	0	203	182
75	ARM	Anastasia Galustyan	948	2017/2018 season (100%)	0	0	0	144	0
75	ARM	Anastasia Galustyan	948	2016/2017 season (70%)	185	0	0	142	0
76	ITA	Lucrezia Gennaro	943	2018/2019 season (100%)	126	0	0	225	225
76	ITA	Lucrezia Gennaro	943	2017/2018 season (100%)	0	0	0	203	164
76	ITA	Lucrezia Gennaro	943	2016/2017 season (70%)	0	0	0	0	0
77	PHI	Alisson Krystle Perticheto	917	2018/2019 season (100%)	140	0	0	250	225
77	PHI	Alisson Krystle Perticheto	917	2017/2018 season (100%)	0	0	0	0	0
77	PHI	Alisson Krystle Perticheto	917	2016/2017 season (70%)	0	0	0	175	127
78	RUS	Daria Panenkova	914	2018/2019 season (100%)	0	236	0	198	0
78	RUS	Daria Panenkova	914	2017/2018 season (100%)	0	250	230	0	0
78	RUS	Daria Panenkova	914	2016/2017 season (70%)	0	0	0	0	0
79	JPN	Yura Matsuda	912	2018/2019 season (100%)	0	0	0	0	0
79	JPN	Yura Matsuda	912	2017/2018 season (100%)	0	0	0	225	198
79	JPN	Yura Matsuda	912	2016/2017 season (70%)	0	165	149	175	0
80	AZE	Morgan Flood	856	2018/2019 season (100%)	0	0	0	203	203
80	AZE	Morgan Flood	856	2017/2018 season (100%)	0	0	0	225	225
80	AZE	Morgan Flood	856	2016/2017 season (70%)	0	0	0	0	0
81	GBR	Kristen Spours	855	2018/2019 season (100%)	68	0	0	203	0
81	GBR	Kristen Spours	855	2017/2018 season (100%)	61	0	0	182	164
81	GBR	Kristen Spours	855	2016/2017 season (70%)	80	0	0	158	158
82	CHN	Chen Hongyi	852	2018/2019 season (100%)	214	120	0	178	160
82	CHN	Chen Hongyi	852	2017/2018 season (100%)	83	97	0	0	0
82	CHN	Chen Hongyi	852	2016/2017 season (70%)	0	0	0	0	0
83	RUS	Alisa Fedichkina	826	2018/2019 season (100%)	0	0	0	0	0
83	RUS	Alisa Fedichkina	826	2017/2018 season (100%)	0	182	0	270	270
83	RUS	Alisa Fedichkina	826	2016/2017 season (70%)	0	104	0	0	0
84	SWE	Josefin Taljegard	799	2018/2019 season (100%)	0	0	0	250	182
84	SWE	Josefin Taljegard	799	2017/2018 season (100%)	0	0	0	203	164
84	SWE	Josefin Taljegard	799	2016/2017 season (70%)	0	0	0	0	0
85	EST	Gerli Liinamäe	784	2018/2019 season (100%)	0	0	0	225	182
85	EST	Gerli Liinamäe	784	2017/2018 season (100%)	0	0	0	250	0
85	EST	Gerli Liinamäe	784	2016/2017 season (70%)	0	0	0	127	0
85	FIN	Jenni Saarinen	784	2018/2019 season (100%)	0	0	0	250	225
85	FIN	Jenni Saarinen	784	2017/2018 season (100%)	0	0	0	182	0
85	FIN	Jenni Saarinen	784	2016/2017 season (70%)	0	0	0	127	0
87	SRB	Antonina Dubinina	766	2018/2019 season (100%)	74	0	0	182	182
87	SRB	Antonina Dubinina	766	2017/2018 season (100%)	0	0	0	164	164
87	SRB	Antonina Dubinina	766	2016/2017 season (70%)	0	0	0	127	115
88	RUS	Anna Tarusina	750	2018/2019 season (100%)	0	225	225	300	0
88	RUS	Anna Tarusina	750	2017/2018 season (100%)	0	0	0	0	0
88	RUS	Anna Tarusina	750	2016/2017 season (70%)	0	0	0	0	0
88	SUI	Yasmine Kimiko Yamada	750	2018/2019 season (100%)	192	0	0	144	0
88	SUI	Yasmine Kimiko Yamada	750	2017/2018 season (100%)	0	0	0	164	0
88	SUI	Yasmine Kimiko Yamada	750	2016/2017 season (70%)	0	0	0	0	0
90	FRA	Léa Serna	741	2018/2019 season (100%)	0	0	0	225	164
90	FRA	Léa Serna	741	2017/2018 season (100%)	0	0	0	225	0
90	FRA	Léa Serna	741	2016/2017 season (70%)	0	0	0	127	0
91	JPN	Nana Araki	735	2018/2019 season (100%)	0	164	164	0	0
91	JPN	Nana Araki	735	2017/2018 season (100%)	0	225	182	0	0
91	JPN	Nana Araki	735	2016/2017 season (70%)	0	0	0	0	0
92	SGP	Chloe Ing	726	2018/2019 season (100%)	0	0	0	0	0
92	SGP	Chloe Ing	726	2017/2018 season (100%)	126	0	0	203	203
92	SGP	Chloe Ing	726	2016/2017 season (70%)	79	0	0	115	0
93	ITA	Chenny Paolucci	713	2018/2019 season (100%)	0	0	0	203	182
93	ITA	Chenny Paolucci	713	2017/2018 season (100%)	0	0	0	164	164
93	ITA	Chenny Paolucci	713	2016/2017 season (70%)	0	0	0	0	0
94	UKR	Anna Khnychenkova	710	2018/2019 season (100%)	0	0	0	0	0
94	UKR	Anna Khnychenkova	710	2017/2018 season (100%)	83	0	0	203	178
94	UKR	Anna Khnychenkova	710	2016/2017 season (70%)	71	0	0	175	0
95	GBR	Karly Robertson	709	2018/2019 season (100%)	0	0	0	225	160
95	GBR	Karly Robertson	709	2017/2018 season (100%)	0	0	0	182	0
95	GBR	Karly Robertson	709	2016/2017 season (70%)	0	0	0	142	0
96	RUS	Anastasia Gulyakova	700	2018/2019 season (100%)	0	0	0	250	225
96	RUS	Anastasia Gulyakova	700	2017/2018 season (100%)	0	225	0	0	0
96	RUS	Anastasia Gulyakova	700	2016/2017 season (70%)	0	0	0	0	0
97	JPN	Rin Nitaya	697	2018/2019 season (100%)	0	0	0	0	0
97	JPN	Rin Nitaya	697	2017/2018 season (100%)	0	0	0	250	178
97	JPN	Rin Nitaya	697	2016/2017 season (70%)	0	142	127	0	0
98	KAZ	Aiza Mambekova	693	2018/2019 season (100%)	0	0	0	225	0
98	KAZ	Aiza Mambekova	693	2017/2018 season (100%)	113	0	0	203	0
98	KAZ	Aiza Mambekova	693	2016/2017 season (70%)	0	84	68	0	0
99	AUT	Natalie Klotz	687	2018/2019 season (100%)	0	0	0	0	0
99	AUT	Natalie Klotz	687	2017/2018 season (100%)	0	0	0	203	182
99	AUT	Natalie Klotz	687	2016/2017 season (70%)	0	0	0	175	127
100	UKR	Anastasiia Arkhipova	682	2018/2019 season (100%)	93	182	0	0	0
100	UKR	Anastasiia Arkhipova	682	2017/2018 season (100%)	141	133	133	0	0
100	UKR	Anastasiia Arkhipova	682	2016/2017 season (70%)	0	0	0	0	0
101	USA	Amber Glenn	677	2018/2019 season (100%)	0	0	0	182	178
101	USA	Amber Glenn	677	2017/2018 season (100%)	0	0	0	164	144
101	USA	Amber Glenn	677	2016/2017 season (70%)	0	0	0	153	139
102	AUT	Kerstin Frank	672	2018/2019 season (100%)	0	0	0	0	0
102	AUT	Kerstin Frank	672	2017/2018 season (100%)	0	0	0	225	225
102	AUT	Kerstin Frank	672	2016/2017 season (70%)	64	0	0	158	0
103	USA	Ashley Lin	669	2018/2019 season (100%)	0	0	0	219	198
103	USA	Ashley Lin	669	2017/2018 season (100%)	0	148	0	0	0
103	USA	Ashley Lin	669	2016/2017 season (70%)	0	104	0	0	0
104	AUT	Sophia Schaller	664	2018/2019 season (100%)	0	0	0	182	164
104	AUT	Sophia Schaller	664	2017/2018 season (100%)	0	0	0	250	0
104	AUT	Sophia Schaller	664	2016/2017 season (70%)	0	68	0	0	0
105	CAN	Alicia Pineault	661	2018/2019 season (100%)	0	0	0	178	0
105	CAN	Alicia Pineault	661	2017/2018 season (100%)	237	0	0	178	0
105	CAN	Alicia Pineault	661	2016/2017 season (70%)	0	68	0	0	0
106	CHN	Li Zijun	650	2018/2019 season (100%)	0	0	0	0	0
106	CHN	Li Zijun	650	2017/2018 season (100%)	0	0	0	0	0
106	CHN	Li Zijun	650	2016/2017 season (70%)	312	204	134	0	0
107	USA	Emmy Ma	640	2018/2019 season (100%)	0	0	0	0	0
107	USA	Emmy Ma	640	2017/2018 season (100%)	75	203	164	198	0
107	USA	Emmy Ma	640	2016/2017 season (70%)	0	0	0	0	0
108	ITA	Elettra Maria Olivotto	632	2018/2019 season (100%)	0	0	0	225	182
108	ITA	Elettra Maria Olivotto	632	2017/2018 season (100%)	0	0	0	225	0
108	ITA	Elettra Maria Olivotto	632	2016/2017 season (70%)	0	0	0	0	0
109	NOR	Anne Line Gjersem	625	2018/2019 season (100%)	0	0	0	0	0
109	NOR	Anne Line Gjersem	625	2017/2018 season (100%)	140	0	0	203	0
109	NOR	Anne Line Gjersem	625	2016/2017 season (70%)	52	0	0	115	115
110	KOR	Lee Hae-in	624	2018/2019 season (100%)	239	203	182	0	0
110	KOR	Lee Hae-in	624	2017/2018 season (100%)	0	0	0	0	0
110	KOR	Lee Hae-in	624	2016/2017 season (70%)	0	0	0	0	0
111	RUS	Alexandra Avstriyskaya	613	2018/2019 season (100%)	0	0	0	0	0
111	RUS	Alexandra Avstriyskaya	613	2017/2018 season (100%)	0	0	0	160	144
111	RUS	Alexandra Avstriyskaya	613	2016/2017 season (70%)	0	0	0	170	139
112	GBR	Nina Povey	604	2018/2019 season (100%)	0	0	0	182	0
112	GBR	Nina Povey	604	2017/2018 season (100%)	0	0	0	219	203
112	GBR	Nina Povey	604	2016/2017 season (70%)	0	0	0	0	0
113	JPN	Yuna Aoki	600	2018/2019 season (100%)	0	133	0	225	0
113	JPN	Yuna Aoki	600	2017/2018 season (100%)	0	0	0	0	0
113	JPN	Yuna Aoki	600	2016/2017 season (70%)	0	127	115	0	0
114	ITA	Sara Conti	570	2018/2019 season (100%)	0	0	0	203	203
114	ITA	Sara Conti	570	2017/2018 season (100%)	0	0	0	164	0
114	ITA	Sara Conti	570	2016/2017 season (70%)	0	0	0	0	0
115	TPE	Amy Lin	568	2018/2019 season (100%)	126	0	0	160	0
115	TPE	Amy Lin	568	2017/2018 season (100%)	140	0	0	0	0
115	TPE	Amy Lin	568	2016/2017 season (70%)	109	0	0	142	0
115	LAT	Diāna Ņikitina	568	2018/2019 season (100%)	0	0	0	0	0
115	LAT	Diāna Ņikitina	568	2017/2018 season (100%)	0	0	0	250	225
115	LAT	Diāna Ņikitina	568	2016/2017 season (70%)	0	93	0	0	0
115	RUS	Ksenia Sinitsyna	568	2018/2019 season (100%)	365	203	0	0	0
115	RUS	Ksenia Sinitsyna	568	2017/2018 season (100%)	0	0	0	0	0
115	RUS	Ksenia Sinitsyna	568	2016/2017 season (70%)	0	0	0	0	0
118	USA	Caroline Zhang	555	2018/2019 season (100%)	0	0	0	0	0
118	USA	Caroline Zhang	555	2017/2018 season (100%)	0	0	0	219	178
118	USA	Caroline Zhang	555	2016/2017 season (70%)	0	0	0	158	0
119	NOR	Camilla Gjersem	549	2018/2019 season (100%)	0	0	0	203	0
119	NOR	Camilla Gjersem	549	2017/2018 season (100%)	0	0	0	182	164
119	NOR	Camilla Gjersem	549	2016/2017 season (70%)	0	0	0	0	0
120	CAN	Véronik Mallet	540	2018/2019 season (100%)	362	0	0	178	0
120	CAN	Véronik Mallet	540	2017/2018 season (100%)	0	0	0	0	0
120	CAN	Véronik Mallet	540	2016/2017 season (70%)	0	0	0	0	0
121	CAN	Aurora Cotop	537	2018/2019 season (100%)	0	0	0	203	0
121	CAN	Aurora Cotop	537	2017/2018 season (100%)	93	133	108	0	0
121	CAN	Aurora Cotop	537	2016/2017 season (70%)	0	0	0	0	0
122	USA	Hanna Harrell	532	2018/2019 season (100%)	266	133	0	0	0
122	USA	Hanna Harrell	532	2017/2018 season (100%)	0	133	0	0	0
122	USA	Hanna Harrell	532	2016/2017 season (70%)	0	0	0	0	0
123	CAN	Alison Schumacher	530	2018/2019 season (100%)	194	108	0	0	0
123	CAN	Alison Schumacher	530	2017/2018 season (100%)	0	120	108	0	0
123	CAN	Alison Schumacher	530	2016/2017 season (70%)	0	0	0	0	0
124	RUS	Alena Kanysheva	509	2018/2019 season (100%)	0	284	225	0	0
124	RUS	Alena Kanysheva	509	2017/2018 season (100%)	0	0	0	0	0
124	RUS	Alena Kanysheva	509	2016/2017 season (70%)	0	0	0	0	0
124	DEN	Pernille Sørensen	426	2018/2019 season (100%)	83	0	0	160	0
124	DEN	Pernille Sørensen	426	2017/2018 season (100%)	102	0	0	164	0
124	DEN	Pernille Sørensen	426	2016/2017 season (70%)	0	0	0	0	0
126	USA	Gabriella Izzo	506	2018/2019 season (100%)	0	148	108	250	0
126	USA	Gabriella Izzo	506	2017/2018 season (100%)	0	0	0	0	0
126	USA	Gabriella Izzo	506	2016/2017 season (70%)	0	0	0	0	0
127	FIN	Vera Stolt	503	2018/2019 season (100%)	0	97	0	203	203
127	FIN	Vera Stolt	503	2017/2018 season (100%)	0	0	0	0	0
127	FIN	Vera Stolt	503	2016/2017 season (70%)	0	0	0	0	0
128	JPN	Riko Takino	500	2018/2019 season (100%)	0	133	0	0	0
128	JPN	Riko Takino	500	2017/2018 season (100%)	0	203	164	0	0
128	JPN	Riko Takino	500	2016/2017 season (70%)	0	0	0	0	0
128	USA	Megan Wessenberg	500	2018/2019 season (100%)	0	236	0	160	0
128	USA	Megan Wessenberg	500	2017/2018 season (100%)	0	0	0	0	0
128	USA	Megan Wessenberg	500	2016/2017 season (70%)	0	104	0	0	0
130	KOR	Choi Yu-jin	496	2018/2019 season (100%)	0	0	0	178	160
130	KOR	Choi Yu-jin	496	2017/2018 season (100%)	0	0	0	0	0
130	KOR	Choi Yu-jin	496	2016/2017 season (70%)	0	0	0	158	0
131	CZE	Michaela Lucie Hanzlíková	490	2018/2019 season (100%)	0	0	0	0	0
131	CZE	Michaela Lucie Hanzlíková	490	2017/2018 season (100%)	0	0	0	0	0
131	CZE	Michaela Lucie Hanzlíková	490	2016/2017 season (70%)	79	93	76	127	115
132	JPN	Tomoe Kawabata	485	2018/2019 season (100%)	157	164	164	0	0
132	JPN	Tomoe Kawabata	485	2017/2018 season (100%)	0	0	0	0	0
132	JPN	Tomoe Kawabata	485	2016/2017 season (70%)	0	0	0	0	0
133	SWE	Selma Ihr	475	2018/2019 season (100%)	0	120	120	0	0
133	SWE	Selma Ihr	475	2017/2018 season (100%)	127	108	0	0	0
133	SWE	Selma Ihr	475	2016/2017 season (70%)	0	0	0	0	0
134	KOR	An So-hyun	473	2018/2019 season (100%)	0	0	0	0	0
134	KOR	An So-hyun	473	2017/2018 season (100%)	0	0	0	243	182
134	KOR	An So-hyun	473	2016/2017 season (70%)	48	0	0	0	0
135	ITA	Lucrezia Beccari	472	2018/2019 season (100%)	103	133	0	0	0
135	ITA	Lucrezia Beccari	472	2017/2018 season (100%)	103	133	0	0	0
135	ITA	Lucrezia Beccari	472	2016/2017 season (70%)	0	0	0	0	0
136	CAN	Larkyn Austman	467	2018/2019 season (100%)	325	0	0	0	0
136	CAN	Larkyn Austman	467	2017/2018 season (100%)	0	0	0	0	0
136	CAN	Larkyn Austman	467	2016/2017 season (70%)	0	0	0	142	0
137	ITA	Marina Piredda	142	2018/2019 season (100%)	0	0	0	250	203
137	ITA	Marina Piredda	142	2017/2018 season (100%)	0	0	0	0	0
137	ITA	Marina Piredda	142	2016/2017 season (70%)	0	0	0	0	0
138	NED	Niki Wories	453	2018/2019 season (100%)	0	0	0	203	0
138	NED	Niki Wories	453	2017/2018 season (100%)	0	0	0	250	0
138	NED	Niki Wories	453	2016/2017 season (70%)	0	0	0	0	0
139	KOR	Kim Na-hyun	448	2018/2019 season (100%)	0	0	0	0	0
139	KOR	Kim Na-hyun	448	2017/2018 season (100%)	0	0	0	0	0
139	KOR	Kim Na-hyun	448	2016/2017 season (70%)	0	134	0	189	125
139	USA	Katie McBeath	448	2018/2019 season (100%)	0	0	0	250	198
139	USA	Katie McBeath	448	2017/2018 season (100%)	0	0	0	0	0
139	USA	Katie McBeath	448	2016/2017 season (70%)	0	0	0	0	0
141	HUN	Fruzsina Medgyesi	443	2018/2019 season (100%)	0	0	0	0	0
141	HUN	Fruzsina Medgyesi	443	2017/2018 season (100%)	0	0	0	160	0
141	HUN	Fruzsina Medgyesi	443	2016/2017 season (70%)	0	84	84	115	0
142	USA	Gracie Gold	442	2018/2019 season (100%)	0	0	0	0	0
142	USA	Gracie Gold	442	2017/2018 season (100%)	0	0	0	0	0
142	USA	Gracie Gold	442	2016/2017 season (70%)	0	183	134	125	0
143	LAT	Angelīna Kučvaļska	425	2018/2019 season (100%)	0	0	0	0	0
143	LAT	Angelīna Kučvaļska	425	2017/2018 season (100%)	0	0	0	0	0
143	LAT	Angelīna Kučvaļska	425	2016/2017 season (70%)	92	0	0	175	158
144	SWE	Joshi Helgesson	404	2018/2019 season (100%)	0	0	0	0	0
144	SWE	Joshi Helgesson	404	2017/2018 season (100%)	0	0	0	0	0
144	SWE	Joshi Helgesson	404	2016/2017 season (70%)	150	0	0	127	127
145	ITA	Lara Naki Gutmann	389	2018/2019 season (100%)	0	0	0	225	164
145	ITA	Lara Naki Gutmann	389	2017/2018 season (100%)	0	0	0	0	0
145	ITA	Lara Naki Gutmann	389	2016/2017 season (70%)	0	0	0	0	0
146	GBR	Danielle Harrison	385	2018/2019 season (100%)	0	0	0	0	0
146	GBR	Danielle Harrison	385	2017/2018 season (100%)	0	0	0	203	182
146	GBR	Danielle Harrison	385	2016/2017 season (70%)	0	0	0	0	0
146	SVK	Nina Letenayová	385	2018/2019 season (100%)	0	0	0	0	0
146	SVK	Nina Letenayová	385	2017/2018 season (100%)	0	0	0	203	182
146	SVK	Nina Letenayová	385	2016/2017 season (70%)	0	0	0	0	0
146	JPN	Rion Sumiyoshi	385	2018/2019 season (100%)	0	203	182	0	0
146	JPN	Rion Sumiyoshi	385	2017/2018 season (100%)	0	0	0	0	0
146	JPN	Rion Sumiyoshi	385	2016/2017 season (70%)	0	0	0	0	0
149	FRA	Anna Kuzmenko	382	2018/2019 season (100%)	114	148	120	0	0
149	FRA	Anna Kuzmenko	382	2017/2018 season (100%)	0	0	0	0	0
149	FRA	Anna Kuzmenko	382	2016/2017 season (70%)	0	0	0	0	0
150	EST	Eva-Lotta Kiibus	381	2018/2019 season (100%)	131	0	0	250	0
150	EST	Eva-Lotta Kiibus	381	2017/2018 season (100%)	0	0	0	0	0
150	EST	Eva-Lotta Kiibus	381	2016/2017 season (70%)	0	0	0	0	0
151	USA	Akari Nakahara	369	2018/2019 season (100%)	0	0	0	225	144
151	USA	Akari Nakahara	369	2017/2018 season (100%)	0	0	0	0	0
151	USA	Akari Nakahara	369	2016/2017 season (70%)	0	0	0	0	0
152	GER	Alissa Scheidt	367	2018/2019 season (100%)	0	0	0	203	0
152	GER	Alissa Scheidt	367	2017/2018 season (100%)	0	0	0	164	0
152	GER	Alissa Scheidt	367	2016/2017 season (70%)	0	0	0	0	0
153	SUI	Shaline Ruegger	364	2018/2019 season (100%)	0	0	0	182	182
153	SUI	Shaline Ruegger	364	2017/2018 season (100%)	0	0	0	0	0
153	SUI	Shaline Ruegger	364	2016/2017 season (70%)	0	0	0	0	0
153	POL	Oliwia Rzepiel	182	2018/2019 season (100%)	0	0	0	182	182
153	POL	Oliwia Rzepiel	182	2017/2018 season (100%)	0	0	0	0	0
153	POL	Oliwia Rzepiel	182	2016/2017 season (70%)	0	0	0	0	0
153	AUT	Alisa Stomakhina	364	2018/2019 season (100%)	0	0	0	0	0
153	AUT	Alisa Stomakhina	364	2017/2018 season (100%)	0	0	0	182	182
153	AUT	Alisa Stomakhina	364	2016/2017 season (70%)	0	0	0	0	0
153	KOR	Wi Seo-yeong	364	2018/2019 season (100%)	0	182	182	0	0
153	KOR	Wi Seo-yeong	364	2017/2018 season (100%)	0	0	0	0	0
153	KOR	Wi Seo-yeong	364	2016/2017 season (70%)	0	0	0	0	0
157	FRA	Julie Froetscher	361	2018/2019 season (100%)	0	0	0	0	0
157	FRA	Julie Froetscher	361	2017/2018 season (100%)	0	0	0	164	0
157	FRA	Julie Froetscher	361	2016/2017 season (70%)	0	104	93	0	0
158	EST	Kristina Shkuleta-Gromova	359	2018/2019 season (100%)	0	0	0	0	0
158	EST	Kristina Shkuleta-Gromova	359	2017/2018 season (100%)	0	120	97	0	0
158	EST	Kristina Shkuleta-Gromova	359	2016/2017 season (70%)	0	0	0	142	0
159	JPN	Shiika Yoshioka	351	2018/2019 season (100%)	0	203	148	0	0
159	JPN	Shiika Yoshioka	351	2017/2018 season (100%)	0	0	0	0	0
159	JPN	Shiika Yoshioka	351	2016/2017 season (70%)	0	0	0	0	0
160	CAN	Michelle Long	336	2018/2019 season (100%)	0	0	0	0	0
160	CAN	Michelle Long	336	2017/2018 season (100%)	192	0	0	144	0
160	CAN	Michelle Long	336	2016/2017 season (70%)	0	0	0	0	0
161	NED	Caya Scheepens	333	2018/2019 season (100%)	0	108	0	225	0
161	NED	Caya Scheepens	333	2017/2018 season (100%)	0	0	0	0	0
161	NED	Caya Scheepens	333	2016/2017 season (70%)	0	0	0	0	0
162	USA	Kaitlyn Nguyen	328	2018/2019 season (100%)	0	0	0	0	0
162	USA	Kaitlyn Nguyen	328	2017/2018 season (100%)	0	164	164	0	0
162	USA	Kaitlyn Nguyen	328	2016/2017 season (70%)	0	0	0	0	0
163	GEO	Alina Urushadze	322	2018/2019 season (100%)	174	148	0	0	0
163	GEO	Alina Urushadze	322	2017/2018 season (100%)	0	0	0	0	0
163	GEO	Alina Urushadze	322	2016/2017 season (70%)	0	0	0	0	0
164	GER	Lutricia Bock	320	2018/2019 season (100%)	0	0	0	0	0
164	GER	Lutricia Bock	320	2017/2018 season (100%)	0	0	0	0	0
164	GER	Lutricia Bock	320	2016/2017 season (70%)	0	93	0	115	112
165	RUS	Elizaveta Nugumanova	319	2018/2019 season (100%)	0	0	0	0	0
165	RUS	Elizaveta Nugumanova	319	2017/2018 season (100%)	0	0	0	0	0
165	RUS	Elizaveta Nugumanova	319	2016/2017 season (70%)	0	161	158	0	0
166	ESP	Valentina Matos	316	2018/2019 season (100%)	0	0	0	0	0
166	ESP	Valentina Matos	316	2017/2018 season (100%)	0	0	0	0	0
166	ESP	Valentina Matos	316	2016/2017 season (70%)	31	0	0	158	127
167	JPN	Akari Matsuoka	315	2018/2019 season (100%)	0	0	0	0	0
167	JPN	Akari Matsuoka	315	2017/2018 season (100%)	0	182	133	0	0
167	JPN	Akari Matsuoka	315	2016/2017 season (70%)	0	0	0	0	0
168	JPN	Moa Iwano	312	2018/2019 season (100%)	0	164	0	0	0
168	JPN	Moa Iwano	312	2017/2018 season (100%)	0	148	0	0	0
168	JPN	Moa Iwano	312	2016/2017 season (70%)	0	0	0	0	0
169	ITA	Guia Maria Tagliapietra	300	2018/2019 season (100%)	0	0	0	0	0
169	ITA	Guia Maria Tagliapietra	300	2017/2018 season (100%)	0	0	0	0	0
169	ITA	Guia Maria Tagliapietra	300	2016/2017 season (70%)	0	0	0	158	142
170	KOR	To Ji-hun	297	2018/2019 season (100%)	0	164	133	0	0
170	KOR	To Ji-hun	297	2017/2018 season (100%)	0	0	0	0	0
170	KOR	To Ji-hun	297	2016/2017 season (70%)	0	0	0	0	0
171	SWE	Natasja Remstedt	291	2018/2019 season (100%)	0	0	0	164	0
171	SWE	Natasja Remstedt	291	2017/2018 season (100%)	0	0	0	0	0
171	SWE	Natasja Remstedt	291	2016/2017 season (70%)	0	0	0	127	0
172	CHN	Zhao Ziquan	290	2018/2019 season (100%)	0	0	0	0	0
172	CHN	Zhao Ziquan	290	2017/2018 season (100%)	156	0	0	0	0
172	CHN	Zhao Ziquan	290	2016/2017 season (70%)	134	0	0	0	0
173	USA	Brynne McIsaac	287	2018/2019 season (100%)	0	0	0	203	0
173	USA	Brynne McIsaac	287	2017/2018 season (100%)	0	0	0	0	0
173	USA	Brynne McIsaac	287	2016/2017 season (70%)	0	84	0	0	0
174	LTU	Elžbieta Kropa	274	2018/2019 season (100%)	0	0	0	182	0
174	LTU	Elžbieta Kropa	274	2017/2018 season (100%)	92	0	0	0	0
174	LTU	Elžbieta Kropa	274	2016/2017 season (70%)	0	0	0	0	0
175	RUS	Mariia Bessonova	273	2018/2019 season (100%)	0	0	0	0	0
175	RUS	Mariia Bessonova	273	2017/2018 season (100%)	0	0	0	0	0
175	RUS	Mariia Bessonova	273	2016/2017 season (70%)	0	0	0	158	115
176	USA	Tessa Hong	263	2018/2019 season (100%)	0	0	0	0	0
176	USA	Tessa Hong	263	2017/2018 season (100%)	0	148	0	0	0
176	USA	Tessa Hong	263	2016/2017 season (70%)	0	115	0	0	0
177	ISR	Alina Soupian	261	2018/2019 season (100%)	44	120	97	0	0
177	ISR	Alina Soupian	261	2017/2018 season (100%)	0	0	0	0	0
177	ISR	Alina Soupian	261	2016/2017 season (70%)	0	0	0	0	0
178	RUS	Alisa Lozko	257	2018/2019 season (100%)	0	0	0	0	0
178	RUS	Alisa Lozko	257	2017/2018 season (100%)	0	0	0	0	0
178	RUS	Alisa Lozko	257	2016/2017 season (70%)	0	142	115	0	0
179	CAN	Sarah Tamura	253	2018/2019 season (100%)	0	0	0	0	0
179	CAN	Sarah Tamura	253	2017/2018 season (100%)	0	0	0	0	0
179	CAN	Sarah Tamura	253	2016/2017 season (70%)	65	104	84	0	0
180	KOR	Son Suh-hyun	252	2018/2019 season (100%)	0	0	0	0	0
180	KOR	Son Suh-hyun	252	2017/2018 season (100%)	0	0	0	164	0
180	KOR	Son Suh-hyun	252	2016/2017 season (70%)	88	0	0	0	0
181	UKR	Anastasia Gozhva	252	2018/2019 season (100%)	0	0	0	250	0
181	UKR	Anastasia Gozhva	252	2017/2018 season (100%)	0	0	0	0	0
181	UKR	Anastasia Gozhva	252	2016/2017 season (70%)	0	0	0	0	0
181	SUI	Tanja Odermatt	252	2018/2019 season (100%)	0	0	0	250	0
181	SUI	Tanja Odermatt	252	2017/2018 season (100%)	0	0	0	0	0
181	SUI	Tanja Odermatt	252	2016/2017 season (70%)	0	0	0	0	0
183	THA	Thita Lamsam	247	2018/2019 season (100%)	0	0	0	0	0
183	THA	Thita Lamsam	247	2017/2018 season (100%)	83	0	0	164	0
183	THA	Thita Lamsam	247	2016/2017 season (70%)	0	0	0	0	0
184	MEX	Andrea Montesinos Cantú	242	2018/2019 season (100%)	113	0	0	0	0
184	MEX	Andrea Montesinos Cantú	242	2017/2018 season (100%)	0	0	0	0	0
184	MEX	Andrea Montesinos Cantú	242	2016/2017 season (70%)	53	76	0	0	0
184	GBR	Katie Powell	242	2018/2019 season (100%)	0	0	0	0	0
184	GBR	Katie Powell	242	2017/2018 season (100%)	0	0	0	0	0
184	GBR	Katie Powell	242	2016/2017 season (70%)	0	0	0	127	115
186	ITA	Ilaria Nogaro	230	2018/2019 season (100%)	0	0	0	0	0
186	ITA	Ilaria Nogaro	230	2017/2018 season (100%)	0	0	0	0	0
186	ITA	Ilaria Nogaro	230	2016/2017 season (70%)	0	0	0	115	115
187	KOR	Lee Hyun-soo	228	2018/2019 season (100%)	0	0	0	0	0
187	KOR	Lee Hyun-soo	228	2017/2018 season (100%)	0	120	108	0	0
187	KOR	Lee Hyun-soo	228	2016/2017 season (70%)	0	0	0	0	0
188	RUS	Anastasia Kolomiets	225	2018/2019 season (100%)	0	0	0	225	0
188	RUS	Anastasia Kolomiets	225	2017/2018 season (100%)	0	0	0	0	0
188	RUS	Anastasia Kolomiets	225	2016/2017 season (70%)	0	0	0	0	0
189	HUN	Júlia Láng	224	2018/2019 season (100%)	127	97	0	0	0
189	HUN	Júlia Láng	224	2017/2018 season (100%)	0	0	0	0	0
189	HUN	Júlia Láng	224	2016/2017 season (70%)	0	0	0	0	0
190	RUS	Anastasia Gracheva	219	2018/2019 season (100%)	0	0	0	0	0
190	RUS	Anastasia Gracheva	219	2017/2018 season (100%)	0	0	0	219	0
190	RUS	Anastasia Gracheva	219	2016/2017 season (70%)	0	0	0	0	0
191	SVK	Silvia Hugec	218	2018/2019 season (100%)	0	0	0	144	0
191	SVK	Silvia Hugec	218	2017/2018 season (100%)	74	0	0	0	0
191	SVK	Silvia Hugec	218	2016/2017 season (70%)	0	0	0	0	0
192	RUS	Valeria Mikhailova	213	2018/2019 season (100%)	0	0	0	0	0
192	RUS	Valeria Mikhailova	213	2017/2018 season (100%)	0	213	0	0	0
192	RUS	Valeria Mikhailova	213	2016/2017 season (70%)	0	0	0	0	0
193	HKG	Joanna So	204	2018/2019 season (100%)	102	0	0	0	0
193	HKG	Joanna So	204	2017/2018 season (100%)	102	0	0	0	0
193	HKG	Joanna So	204	2016/2017 season (70%)	0	0	0	0	0
194	FIN	Linnea Ceder	203	2018/2019 season (100%)	0	0	0	203	0
194	FIN	Linnea Ceder	203	2017/2018 season (100%)	0	0	0	0	0
194	FIN	Linnea Ceder	203	2016/2017 season (70%)	0	0	0	0	0
194	POL	Elżbieta Gabryszak	203	2018/2019 season (100%)	0	0	0	203	0
194	POL	Elżbieta Gabryszak	203	2017/2018 season (100%)	0	0	0	0	0
194	POL	Elżbieta Gabryszak	203	2016/2017 season (70%)	0	0	0	0	0
194	JPN	Rino Kasakake	203	2018/2019 season (100%)	0	0	0	0	0
194	JPN	Rino Kasakake	203	2017/2018 season (100%)	0	203	0	0	0
194	JPN	Rino Kasakake	203	2016/2017 season (70%)	0	0	0	0	0
194	ITA	Anna Memola	203	2018/2019 season (100%)	0	0	0	0	0
194	ITA	Anna Memola	203	2017/2018 season (100%)	0	0	0	203	0
194	ITA	Anna Memola	203	2016/2017 season (70%)	0	0	0	0	0
194	GBR	Bethany Powell	203	2018/2019 season (100%)	0	0	0	203	0
194	GBR	Bethany Powell	203	2017/2018 season (100%)	0	0	0	0	0
194	GBR	Bethany Powell	203	2016/2017 season (70%)	0	0	0	0	0
194	RUS	Viktoria Vasilieva	203	2018/2019 season (100%)	0	203	0	0	0
194	RUS	Viktoria Vasilieva	203	2017/2018 season (100%)	0	0	0	0	0
194	RUS	Viktoria Vasilieva	203	2016/2017 season (70%)	0	0	0	0	0
200	BUL	Maria Levushkina	194	2018/2019 season (100%)	0	97	97	0	0
200	BUL	Maria Levushkina	194	2017/2018 season (100%)	0	0	0	0	0
200	BUL	Maria Levushkina	194	2016/2017 season (70%)	0	0	0	0	0
201	AUT	Olga Mikutina	191	2018/2019 season (100%)	83	108	0	0	0
201	AUT	Olga Mikutina	191	2017/2018 season (100%)	0	0	0	0	0
201	AUT	Olga Mikutina	191	2016/2017 season (70%)	0	0	0	0	0
202	RUS	Yulia Lipnitskaya	189	2018/2019 season (100%)	0	0	0	0	0
202	RUS	Yulia Lipnitskaya	189	2017/2018 season (100%)	0	0	0	0	0
202	RUS	Yulia Lipnitskaya	189	2016/2017 season (70%)	0	0	0	189	0
203	SGP	Yu Shuran	186	2018/2019 season (100%)	0	0	0	0	0
203	SGP	Yu Shuran	186	2017/2018 season (100%)	0	0	0	0	0
203	SGP	Yu Shuran	186	2016/2017 season (70%)	71	0	0	115	0
204	KAZ	Zhansaya Adykhanova	182	2018/2019 season (100%)	0	0	0	0	0
204	KAZ	Zhansaya Adykhanova	182	2017/2018 season (100%)	0	0	0	182	0
204	KAZ	Zhansaya Adykhanova	182	2016/2017 season (70%)	0	0	0	0	0
204	USA	Maxine Bautista	182	2018/2019 season (100%)	0	0	0	182	0
204	USA	Maxine Bautista	182	2017/2018 season (100%)	0	0	0	0	0
204	USA	Maxine Bautista	182	2016/2017 season (70%)	0	0	0	0	0
204	FIN	Laura Karhunen	182	2018/2019 season (100%)	0	0	0	182	0
204	FIN	Laura Karhunen	182	2017/2018 season (100%)	0	0	0	0	0
204	FIN	Laura Karhunen	182	2016/2017 season (70%)	0	0	0	0	0
204	FRA	Sandra Ramond	182	2018/2019 season (100%)	0	0	0	0	0
204	FRA	Sandra Ramond	182	2017/2018 season (100%)	0	0	0	182	0
204	FRA	Sandra Ramond	182	2016/2017 season (70%)	0	0	0	0	0
204	NOR	Marianne Stalen	182	2018/2019 season (100%)	0	0	0	182	0
204	NOR	Marianne Stalen	182	2017/2018 season (100%)	0	0	0	0	0
204	NOR	Marianne Stalen	182	2016/2017 season (70%)	0	0	0	0	0
209	CAN	Emy Decelles	178	2018/2019 season (100%)	0	0	0	0	0
209	CAN	Emy Decelles	178	2017/2018 season (100%)	0	0	0	178	0
209	CAN	Emy Decelles	178	2016/2017 season (70%)	0	0	0	0	0
210	SWE	Isabelle Olsson	175	2018/2019 season (100%)	0	0	0	0	0
210	SWE	Isabelle Olsson	175	2017/2018 season (100%)	0	0	0	0	0
210	SWE	Isabelle Olsson	175	2016/2017 season (70%)	0	0	0	175	0
211	SVK	Bronislava Dobiášová	164	2018/2019 season (100%)	0	0	0	164	0
211	SVK	Bronislava Dobiášová	164	2017/2018 season (100%)	0	0	0	0	0
211	SVK	Bronislava Dobiášová	164	2016/2017 season (70%)	0	0	0	0	0
211	BUL	Kristina Grigorova	164	2018/2019 season (100%)	0	0	0	164	0
211	BUL	Kristina Grigorova	164	2017/2018 season (100%)	0	0	0	0	0
211	BUL	Kristina Grigorova	164	2016/2017 season (70%)	0	0	0	0	0
211	SWE	Elin Hallberg	164	2018/2019 season (100%)	0	0	0	0	0
211	SWE	Elin Hallberg	164	2017/2018 season (100%)	0	0	0	164	0
211	SWE	Elin Hallberg	164	2016/2017 season (70%)	0	0	0	0	0
211	ISR	Alina Iushchenkova	164	2018/2019 season (100%)	0	0	0	164	0
211	ISR	Alina Iushchenkova	164	2017/2018 season (100%)	0	0	0	0	0
211	ISR	Alina Iushchenkova	164	2016/2017 season (70%)	0	0	0	0	0
211	GRE	Dimitra Korri	164	2018/2019 season (100%)	0	0	0	164	0
211	GRE	Dimitra Korri	164	2017/2018 season (100%)	0	0	0	0	0
211	GRE	Dimitra Korri	164	2016/2017 season (70%)	0	0	0	0	0
211	TUR	Sinem Kuyucu	164	2018/2019 season (100%)	0	0	0	164	0
211	TUR	Sinem Kuyucu	164	2017/2018 season (100%)	0	0	0	0	0
211	TUR	Sinem Kuyucu	164	2016/2017 season (70%)	0	0	0	0	0
211	LTU	Greta Morkytė	164	2018/2019 season (100%)	0	0	0	164	0
211	LTU	Greta Morkytė	164	2017/2018 season (100%)	0	0	0	0	0
211	LTU	Greta Morkytė	164	2016/2017 season (70%)	0	0	0	0	0
211	FIN	Jade Rautiainen	164	2018/2019 season (100%)	0	0	0	164	0
211	FIN	Jade Rautiainen	164	2017/2018 season (100%)	0	0	0	0	0
211	FIN	Jade Rautiainen	164	2016/2017 season (70%)	0	0	0	0	0
211	BUL	Svetoslava Ryadkova	164	2018/2019 season (100%)	0	0	0	0	0
211	BUL	Svetoslava Ryadkova	164	2017/2018 season (100%)	0	0	0	164	0
211	BUL	Svetoslava Ryadkova	164	2016/2017 season (70%)	0	0	0	0	0
220	RUS	Evgenia Ivankova	158	2018/2019 season (100%)	0	0	0	0	0
220	RUS	Evgenia Ivankova	158	2017/2018 season (100%)	0	0	0	0	0
220	RUS	Evgenia Ivankova	158	2016/2017 season (70%)	0	0	0	158	0
221	AUT	Stefanie Pesendorfer	157	2018/2019 season (100%)	0	0	0	0	0
221	AUT	Stefanie Pesendorfer	157	2017/2018 season (100%)	157	0	0	0	0
221	AUT	Stefanie Pesendorfer	157	2016/2017 season (70%)	0	0	0	0	0
222	JPN	Miyu Nakashio	153	2018/2019 season (100%)	0	0	0	0	0
222	JPN	Miyu Nakashio	153	2017/2018 season (100%)	0	0	0	0	0
222	JPN	Miyu Nakashio	153	2016/2017 season (70%)	0	0	0	153	0
223	FIN	Joanna Kallela	152	2018/2019 season (100%)	0	0	0	0	0
223	FIN	Joanna Kallela	152	2017/2018 season (100%)	0	0	0	0	0
223	FIN	Joanna Kallela	152	2016/2017 season (70%)	0	76	76	0	0
224	JPN	Akari Matsubara	148	2018/2019 season (100%)	0	0	0	0	0
224	JPN	Akari Matsubara	148	2017/2018 season (100%)	0	148	0	0	0
224	JPN	Akari Matsubara	148	2016/2017 season (70%)	0	0	0	0	0
225	HKG	Hiu Ching Kwong	144	2018/2019 season (100%)	0	0	0	144	0
225	HKG	Hiu Ching Kwong	144	2017/2018 season (100%)	0	0	0	0	0
225	HKG	Hiu Ching Kwong	144	2016/2017 season (70%)	0	0	0	0	0
225	USA	Hannah Miller	144	2018/2019 season (100%)	0	0	0	0	0
225	USA	Hannah Miller	144	2017/2018 season (100%)	0	0	0	144	0
225	USA	Hannah Miller	144	2016/2017 season (70%)	0	0	0	0	0
227	RSA	Michaela du Toit	142	2018/2019 season (100%)	0	0	0	0	0
227	RSA	Michaela du Toit	142	2017/2018 season (100%)	0	0	0	0	0
227	RSA	Michaela du Toit	142	2016/2017 season (70%)	0	0	0	142	0
227	KOR	Kim Se-na	142	2018/2019 season (100%)	0	0	0	0	0
227	KOR	Kim Se-na	142	2017/2018 season (100%)	0	0	0	0	0
227	KOR	Kim Se-na	142	2016/2017 season (70%)	0	0	0	142	0
227	GBR	Anna Litvinenko	142	2018/2019 season (100%)	0	0	0	0	0
227	GBR	Anna Litvinenko	142	2017/2018 season (100%)	0	0	0	0	0
227	GBR	Anna Litvinenko	142	2016/2017 season (70%)	0	0	0	142	0
227	AUT	Lara Roth	142	2018/2019 season (100%)	0	0	0	0	0
227	AUT	Lara Roth	142	2017/2018 season (100%)	0	0	0	0	0
227	AUT	Lara Roth	142	2016/2017 season (70%)	0	0	0	142	0
231	JPN	Mariko Kihara	139	2018/2019 season (100%)	0	0	0	0	0
231	JPN	Mariko Kihara	139	2017/2018 season (100%)	0	0	0	0	0
231	JPN	Mariko Kihara	139	2016/2017 season (70%)	0	0	0	139	0
231	RUS	Natalia Ogoreltseva	139	2018/2019 season (100%)	0	0	0	0	0
231	RUS	Natalia Ogoreltseva	139	2017/2018 season (100%)	0	0	0	0	0
231	RUS	Natalia Ogoreltseva	139	2016/2017 season (70%)	0	0	0	139	0
231	USA	Paige Rydberg	139	2018/2019 season (100%)	0	0	0	0	0
231	USA	Paige Rydberg	139	2017/2018 season (100%)	0	0	0	0	0
231	USA	Paige Rydberg	139	2016/2017 season (70%)	0	0	0	139	0
234	TUR	Güzide Irmak Bayır	136	2018/2019 season (100%)	0	0	0	0	0
234	TUR	Güzide Irmak Bayır	136	2017/2018 season (100%)	0	97	0	0	0
234	TUR	Güzide Irmak Bayır	136	2016/2017 season (70%)	39	0	0	0	0
235	EST	Helery Hälvin	134	2018/2019 season (100%)	0	0	0	0	0
235	EST	Helery Hälvin	134	2017/2018 season (100%)	0	0	0	0	0
235	EST	Helery Hälvin	134	2016/2017 season (70%)	134	0	0	0	0
236	KOR	Lee Seo-young	127	2018/2019 season (100%)	0	0	0	0	0
236	KOR	Lee Seo-young	127	2017/2018 season (100%)	0	0	0	0	0
236	KOR	Lee Seo-young	127	2016/2017 season (70%)	0	0	0	127	0
237	USA	Emily Chan	125	2018/2019 season (100%)	0	0	0	0	0
237	USA	Emily Chan	125	2017/2018 season (100%)	0	0	0	0	0
237	USA	Emily Chan	125	2016/2017 season (70%)	0	0	0	125	0
237	JPN	Kanako Murakami	125	2018/2019 season (100%)	0	0	0	0	0
237	JPN	Kanako Murakami	125	2017/2018 season (100%)	0	0	0	0	0
237	JPN	Kanako Murakami	125	2016/2017 season (70%)	0	0	0	125	0
238	KOR	Jeon Su-been	120	2018/2019 season (100%)	0	0	0	0	0
238	KOR	Jeon Su-been	120	2017/2018 season (100%)	0	120	0	0	0
238	KOR	Jeon Su-been	120	2016/2017 season (70%)	0	0	0	0	0
238	USA	Pooja Kalyan	120	2018/2019 season (100%)	0	120	0	0	0
238	USA	Pooja Kalyan	120	2017/2018 season (100%)	0	0	0	0	0
238	USA	Pooja Kalyan	120	2016/2017 season (70%)	0	0	0	0	0
238	UKR	Sofiia Nesterova	120	2018/2019 season (100%)	0	0	0	0	0
238	UKR	Sofiia Nesterova	120	2017/2018 season (100%)	0	120	0	0	0
238	UKR	Sofiia Nesterova	120	2016/2017 season (70%)	0	0	0	0	0
238	FIN	Sofia Sula	120	2018/2019 season (100%)	0	0	0	0	0
238	FIN	Sofia Sula	120	2017/2018 season (100%)	0	120	0	0	0
238	FIN	Sofia Sula	120	2016/2017 season (70%)	0	0	0	0	0
243	JPN	Kokoro Iwamoto	115	2018/2019 season (100%)	0	0	0	0	0
243	JPN	Kokoro Iwamoto	115	2017/2018 season (100%)	0	0	0	0	0
243	JPN	Kokoro Iwamoto	115	2016/2017 season (70%)	0	115	0	0	0
243	AUT	Anita Kapferer	115	2018/2019 season (100%)	0	0	0	0	0
243	AUT	Anita Kapferer	115	2017/2018 season (100%)	0	0	0	0	0
243	AUT	Anita Kapferer	115	2016/2017 season (70%)	0	0	0	115	0
243	ITA	Alessia Zardini	115	2018/2019 season (100%)	0	0	0	0	0
243	ITA	Alessia Zardini	115	2017/2018 season (100%)	0	0	0	0	0
243	ITA	Alessia Zardini	115	2016/2017 season (70%)	0	0	0	115	0
246	KOR	Byun Ji-hyun	112	2018/2019 season (100%)	0	0	0	0	0
246	KOR	Byun Ji-hyun	112	2017/2018 season (100%)	0	0	0	0	0
246	KOR	Byun Ji-hyun	112	2016/2017 season (70%)	0	0	0	112	0
247	CAN	Sarah-Maude Blanchard	108	2018/2019 season (100%)	0	108	0	0	0
247	CAN	Sarah-Maude Blanchard	108	2017/2018 season (100%)	0	0	0	0	0
247	CAN	Sarah-Maude Blanchard	108	2016/2017 season (70%)	0	0	0	0	0
247	CAN	Emma Bulawka	108	2018/2019 season (100%)	0	108	0	0	0
247	CAN	Emma Bulawka	108	2017/2018 season (100%)	0	0	0	0	0
247	CAN	Emma Bulawka	108	2016/2017 season (70%)	0	0	0	0	0
247	KOR	Ko Eun-bi	108	2018/2019 season (100%)	0	0	0	0	0
247	KOR	Ko Eun-bi	108	2017/2018 season (100%)	0	108	0	0	0
247	KOR	Ko Eun-bi	108	2016/2017 season (70%)	0	0	0	0	0
247	LTU	Paulina Ramanauskaitė	108	2018/2019 season (100%)	0	108	0	0	0
247	LTU	Paulina Ramanauskaitė	108	2017/2018 season (100%)	0	0	0	0	0
247	LTU	Paulina Ramanauskaitė	108	2016/2017 season (70%)	0	0	0	0	0
251	ISR	Aimee Buchanan	101	2018/2019 season (100%)	0	0	0	0	0
251	ISR	Aimee Buchanan	101	2017/2018 season (100%)	0	0	0	0	0
251	ISR	Aimee Buchanan	101	2016/2017 season (70%)	0	0	0	101	0
251	USA	Franchesca Chiera	101	2018/2019 season (100%)	0	0	0	0	0
251	USA	Franchesca Chiera	101	2017/2018 season (100%)	0	0	0	0	0
251	USA	Franchesca Chiera	101	2016/2017 season (70%)	0	0	0	101	0
253	HKG	Maisy Hiu Ching Ma	98	2018/2019 season (100%)	0	0	0	0	0
253	HKG	Maisy Hiu Ching Ma	98	2017/2018 season (100%)	0	0	0	0	0
253	HKG	Maisy Hiu Ching Ma	98	2016/2017 season (70%)	98	0	0	0	0
254	CAN	Hannah Dawson	97	2018/2019 season (100%)	0	97	0	0	0
254	CAN	Hannah Dawson	97	2017/2018 season (100%)	0	0	0	0	0
254	CAN	Hannah Dawson	97	2016/2017 season (70%)	0	0	0	0	0
254	USA	Angelina Huang	97	2018/2019 season (100%)	0	0	0	0	0
254	USA	Angelina Huang	97	2017/2018 season (100%)	0	97	0	0	0
254	USA	Angelina Huang	97	2016/2017 season (70%)	0	0	0	0	0
256	GER	Annika Hocke	93	2018/2019 season (100%)	0	0	0	0	0
256	GER	Annika Hocke	93	2017/2018 season (100%)	0	0	0	0	0
256	GER	Annika Hocke	93	2016/2017 season (70%)	0	93	0	0	0
256	USA	Gabrielle Noullet	93	2018/2019 season (100%)	0	0	0	0	0
256	USA	Gabrielle Noullet	93	2017/2018 season (100%)	0	0	0	0	0
256	USA	Gabrielle Noullet	93	2016/2017 season (70%)	0	93	0	0	0
258	THA	Natalie Sangkagalo	92	2018/2019 season (100%)	0	0	0	0	0
258	THA	Natalie Sangkagalo	92	2017/2018 season (100%)	92	0	0	0	0
258	THA	Natalie Sangkagalo	92	2016/2017 season (70%)	0	0	0	0	0
259	CAN	Olivia Gran	76	2018/2019 season (100%)	0	0	0	0	0
259	CAN	Olivia Gran	76	2017/2018 season (100%)	0	0	0	0	0
259	CAN	Olivia Gran	76	2016/2017 season (70%)	0	76	0	0	0
259	USA	Nina Ouellette	76	2018/2019 season (100%)	0	0	0	0	0
259	USA	Nina Ouellette	76	2017/2018 season (100%)	0	0	0	0	0
259	USA	Nina Ouellette	76	2016/2017 season (70%)	0	76	0	0	0
261	CAN	Emily Bausback	68	2018/2019 season (100%)	0	0	0	0	0
261	CAN	Emily Bausback	68	2017/2018 season (100%)	0	0	0	0	0
261	CAN	Emily Bausback	68	2016/2017 season (70%)	0	68	0	0	0
261	FRA	Alizée Crozet	68	2018/2019 season (100%)	0	0	0	0	0
261	FRA	Alizée Crozet	68	2017/2018 season (100%)	0	0	0	0	0
261	FRA	Alizée Crozet	68	2016/2017 season (70%)	0	68	0	0	0
261	GER	Ann-Christin Marold	68	2018/2019 season (100%)	0	0	0	0	0
261	GER	Ann-Christin Marold	68	2017/2018 season (100%)	68	0	0	0	0
261	GER	Ann-Christin Marold	68	2016/2017 season (70%)	0	0	0	0	0
264	KAZ	Alana Toktarova	55	2018/2019 season (100%)	0	0	0	0	0
264	KAZ	Alana Toktarova	55	2017/2018 season (100%)	55	0	0	0	0
264	KAZ	Alana Toktarova	55	2016/2017 season (70%)	0	0	0	0	0
265	SUI	Anaïs Coraducci	55	2018/2019 season (100%)	49	0	0	0	0
265	SUI	Anaïs Coraducci	55	2017/2018 season (100%)	0	0	0	0	0
265	SUI	Anaïs Coraducci	55	2016/2017 season (70%)	0	0	0	0	0
266	NED	Kyarha Van Tiel	44	2018/2019 season (100%)	0	0	0	0	0
266	NED	Kyarha Van Tiel	44	2017/2018 season (100%)	44	0	0	0	0
266	NED	Kyarha Van Tiel	44	2016/2017 season (70%)	0	0	0	0	0
267	AUS	Holly Harris	34	2018/2019 season (100%)	0	0	0	0	0
267	AUS	Holly Harris	34	2017/2018 season (100%)	0	0	0	0	0
267	AUS	Holly Harris	34	2016/2017 season (70%)	34	0	0	0	0

=== Pairs ===
As of April 9, 2019.

Rank	Nation	Couple	Points	Season	ISU Championships or Olympics	(Junior) Grand Prix and Final		Selected International Competition	
Rank	Nation	Couple	Points	Season	Best	Best	2nd Best	Best	2nd Best
1	RUS	Evgenia Tarasova / Vladimir Morozov	5103	2018/2019 season (100%)	1080	648	400	300	0
1	RUS	Evgenia Tarasova / Vladimir Morozov	5103	2017/2018 season (100%)	1080	525	400	300	0
1	RUS	Evgenia Tarasova / Vladimir Morozov	5103	2016/2017 season (70%)	680	560	252	210	0
2	RUS	Natalia Zabiiako / Alexander Enbert	4600	2018/2019 season (100%)	972	583	400	300	0
2	RUS	Natalia Zabiiako / Alexander Enbert	4600	2017/2018 season (100%)	875	292	292	300	300
2	RUS	Natalia Zabiiako / Alexander Enbert	4600	2016/2017 season (70%)	386	408	252	170	0
3	FRA	Vanessa James / Morgan Ciprès	4485	2018/2019 season (100%)	840	800	400	300	0
3	FRA	Vanessa James / Morgan Ciprès	4485	2017/2018 season (100%)	972	360	324	300	0
3	FRA	Vanessa James / Morgan Ciprès	4485	2016/2017 season (70%)	476	227	204	189	0
4	GER	Aljona Savchenko / Bruno Massot	4196	2018/2019 season (100%)	0	0	0	0	0
4	GER	Aljona Savchenko / Bruno Massot	4196	2017/2018 season (100%)	1200	800	400	270	0
4	GER	Aljona Savchenko / Bruno Massot	4196	2016/2017 season (70%)	756	280	280	210	0
5	ITA	Nicole Della Monica / Matteo Guarise	3893	2018/2019 season (100%)	612	525	360	243	0
5	ITA	Nicole Della Monica / Matteo Guarise	3893	2017/2018 season (100%)	787	324	292	270	270
5	ITA	Nicole Della Monica / Matteo Guarise	3893	2016/2017 season (70%)	281	183	165	210	210
6	CAN	Kirsten Moore-Towers / Michael Marinaro	3481	2018/2019 season (100%)	756	324	292	270	270
6	CAN	Kirsten Moore-Towers / Michael Marinaro	3481	2017/2018 season (100%)	709	324	236	300	0
6	CAN	Kirsten Moore-Towers / Michael Marinaro	3481	2016/2017 season (70%)	312	0	0	0	0
7	CHN	Sui Wenjing / Han Cong	3400	2018/2019 season (100%)	1200	0	0	0	0
7	CHN	Sui Wenjing / Han Cong	3400	2017/2018 season (100%)	1080	720	400	0	0
7	CHN	Sui Wenjing / Han Cong	3400	2016/2017 season (70%)	840	0	0	0	0
8	CHN	Peng Cheng / Jin Yang	3364	2018/2019 season (100%)	875	720	360	0	0
8	CHN	Peng Cheng / Jin Yang	3364	2017/2018 season (100%)	517	262	262	300	0
8	CHN	Peng Cheng / Jin Yang	3364	2016/2017 season (70%)	386	330	252	0	0
9	RUS	Aleksandra Boikova / Dmitrii Kozlovskii	3178	2018/2019 season (100%)	709	324	292	270	243
9	RUS	Aleksandra Boikova / Dmitrii Kozlovskii	3178	2017/2018 season (100%)	0	230	225	300	270
9	RUS	Aleksandra Boikova / Dmitrii Kozlovskii	3178	2016/2017 season (70%)	315	199	158	0	0
10	CHN	Yu Xiaoyu / Zhang Hao	3117	2018/2019 season (100%)	0	0	0	0	0
10	CHN	Yu Xiaoyu / Zhang Hao	3117	2017/2018 season (100%)	638	472	360	250	0
10	CHN	Yu Xiaoyu / Zhang Hao	3117	2016/2017 season (70%)	613	504	280	0	0
11	USA	Ashley Cain / Timothy LeDuc	3051	2018/2019 season (100%)	612	324	236	300	198
11	USA	Ashley Cain / Timothy LeDuc	3051	2017/2018 season (100%)	756	236	0	219	0
11	USA	Ashley Cain / Timothy LeDuc	3051	2016/2017 season (70%)	253	0	0	170	153
12	USA	Tarah Kayne / Danny O'Shea	2979	2018/2019 season (100%)	496	360	262	270	0
12	USA	Tarah Kayne / Danny O'Shea	2979	2017/2018 season (100%)	840	0	0	243	0
12	USA	Tarah Kayne / Danny O'Shea	2979	2016/2017 season (70%)	0	204	165	139	0
13	AUT	Miriam Ziegler / Severin Kiefer	2911	2018/2019 season (100%)	465	292	292	300	250
13	AUT	Miriam Ziegler / Severin Kiefer	2911	2017/2018 season (100%)	446	236	236	219	0
13	AUT	Miriam Ziegler / Severin Kiefer	2911	2016/2017 season (70%)	253	165	165	175	158
14	ITA	Valentina Marchei / Ondřej Hotárek	2905	2018/2019 season (100%)	0	0	0	0	0
14	ITA	Valentina Marchei / Ondřej Hotárek	2905	2017/2018 season (100%)	709	292	262	300	243
14	ITA	Valentina Marchei / Ondřej Hotárek	2905	2016/2017 season (70%)	362	204	134	210	189
15	RUS	Daria Pavliuchenko / Denis Khodykin	2782	2018/2019 season (100%)	551	472	324	203	198
15	RUS	Daria Pavliuchenko / Denis Khodykin	2782	2017/2018 season (100%)	500	284	250	0	0
15	RUS	Daria Pavliuchenko / Denis Khodykin	2782	2016/2017 season (70%)	0	0	0	0	0
16	AUS	Ekaterina Alexandrovskaya / Harley Windsor	2658	2018/2019 season (100%)	0	213	213	243	0
16	AUS	Ekaterina Alexandrovskaya / Harley Windsor	2658	2017/2018 season (100%)	496	350	250	300	243
16	AUS	Ekaterina Alexandrovskaya / Harley Windsor	2658	2016/2017 season (70%)	350	175	161	0	0
17	USA	Alexa Scimeca Knierim / Chris Knierim	2572	2018/2019 season (100%)	0	324	292	270	270
17	USA	Alexa Scimeca Knierim / Chris Knierim	2572	2017/2018 season (100%)	275	262	262	270	0
17	USA	Alexa Scimeca Knierim / Chris Knierim	2572	2016/2017 season (70%)	347	0	0	0	0
18	USA	Haven Denney / Brandon Frazier	2514	2018/2019 season (100%)	551	236	0	243	0
18	USA	Haven Denney / Brandon Frazier	2514	2017/2018 season (100%)	0	213	213	219	0
18	USA	Haven Denney / Brandon Frazier	2514	2016/2017 season (70%)	281	252	204	153	153
19	RUS	Ksenia Stolbova / Fedor Klimov	2493	2018/2019 season (100%)	0	0	0	0	0
19	RUS	Ksenia Stolbova / Fedor Klimov	2493	2017/2018 season (100%)	756	583	360	243	0
19	RUS	Ksenia Stolbova / Fedor Klimov	2493	2016/2017 season (70%)	551	0	0	0	0
20	GER	Minerva Fabienne Hase / Nolan Seegert	2087	2018/2019 season (100%)	496	262	213	250	219
20	GER	Minerva Fabienne Hase / Nolan Seegert	2087	2017/2018 season (100%)	0	0	0	243	219
20	GER	Minerva Fabienne Hase / Nolan Seegert	2087	2016/2017 season (70%)	185	0	0	170	142
21	ESP	Laura Barquero / Aritz Maestu	1913	2018/2019 season (100%)	446	236	213	225	198
21	ESP	Laura Barquero / Aritz Maestu	1913	2017/2018 season (100%)	293	0	0	250	0
21	ESP	Laura Barquero / Aritz Maestu	1913	2016/2017 season (70%)	0	0	0	0	0
22	RUS	Alisa Efimova / Alexander Korovin	1884	2018/2019 season (100%)	0	360	262	300	300
22	RUS	Alisa Efimova / Alexander Korovin	1884	2017/2018 season (100%)	0	0	0	270	243
22	RUS	Alisa Efimova / Alexander Korovin	1884	2016/2017 season (70%)	0	149	0	189	158
23	GER	Annika Hocke / Ruben Blommaert	1843	2018/2019 season (100%)	305	213	0	225	203
23	GER	Annika Hocke / Ruben Blommaert	1843	2017/2018 season (100%)	402	0	0	270	225
23	GER	Annika Hocke / Ruben Blommaert	1843	2016/2017 season (70%)	0	0	0	0	0
24	PRK	Ryom Tae-ok / Kim Ju-sik	1827	2018/2019 season (100%)	418	292	262	0	0
24	PRK	Ryom Tae-ok / Kim Ju-sik	1827	2017/2018 season (100%)	680	0	0	0	0
24	PRK	Ryom Tae-ok / Kim Ju-sik	1827	2016/2017 season (70%)	193	0	0	175	0
25	RUS	Polina Kostiukovich / Dmitrii Ialin	1818	2018/2019 season (100%)	405	315	250	0	0
25	RUS	Polina Kostiukovich / Dmitrii Ialin	1818	2017/2018 season (100%)	450	250	148	0	0
25	RUS	Polina Kostiukovich / Dmitrii Ialin	1818	2016/2017 season (70%)	0	0	0	0	0
26	CAN	Camille Ruest / Andrew Wolfe	1817	2018/2019 season (100%)	402	262	191	198	0
26	CAN	Camille Ruest / Andrew Wolfe	1817	2017/2018 season (100%)	446	0	0	0	0
26	CAN	Camille Ruest / Andrew Wolfe	1817	2016/2017 season (70%)	0	165	0	153	0
27	CAN	Evelyn Walsh / Trennt Michaud	1579	2018/2019 season (100%)	446	262	191	0	0
27	CAN	Evelyn Walsh / Trennt Michaud	1579	2017/2018 season (100%)	295	203	182	0	0
27	CAN	Evelyn Walsh / Trennt Michaud	1579	2016/2017 season (70%)	230	115	0	0	0
28	USA	Audrey Lu / Misha Mitrofanov	1573	2018/2019 season (100%)	0	236	213	270	198
28	USA	Audrey Lu / Misha Mitrofanov	1573	2017/2018 season (100%)	328	164	164	0	0
28	USA	Audrey Lu / Misha Mitrofanov	1573	2016/2017 season (70%)	0	0	0	0	0
29	GBR	Zoe Jones / Christopher Boyadji	1526	2018/2019 season (100%)	325	0	0	225	203
29	GBR	Zoe Jones / Christopher Boyadji	1526	2017/2018 season (100%)	0	191	0	250	182
29	GBR	Zoe Jones / Christopher Boyadji	1526	2016/2017 season (70%)	150	0	0	115	0
30	RUS	Apollinariia Panfilova / Dmitry Rylov	1524	2018/2019 season (100%)	450	284	225	0	0
30	RUS	Apollinariia Panfilova / Dmitry Rylov	1524	2017/2018 season (100%)	0	315	250	0	0
30	RUS	Apollinariia Panfilova / Dmitry Rylov	1524	2016/2017 season (70%)	0	0	0	0	0
31	RUS	Anastasia Mishina / Aleksandr Galliamov	1505	2018/2019 season (100%)	500	350	250	0	0
31	RUS	Anastasia Mishina / Aleksandr Galliamov	1505	2017/2018 season (100%)	405	0	0	0	0
31	RUS	Anastasia Mishina / Aleksandr Galliamov	1505	2016/2017 season (70%)	0	0	0	0	0
32	USA	Deanna Stellato-Dudek / Nathan Bartholomay	1464	2018/2019 season (100%)	0	236	0	243	243
32	USA	Deanna Stellato-Dudek / Nathan Bartholomay	1464	2017/2018 season (100%)	551	191	0	0	0
32	USA	Deanna Stellato-Dudek / Nathan Bartholomay	1464	2016/2017 season (70%)	0	0	0	0	0
33	CRO	Lana Petranović / Antonio Souza-Kordeiru	1433	2018/2019 season (100%)	402	0	0	250	182
33	CRO	Lana Petranović / Antonio Souza-Kordeiru	1433	2017/2018 season (100%)	264	0	0	182	0
33	CRO	Lana Petranović / Antonio Souza-Kordeiru	1433	2016/2017 season (70%)	134	0	0	153	139
34	ITA	Rebecca Ghilardi / Filippo Ambrosini	1323	2018/2019 season (100%)	362	0	0	219	164
34	ITA	Rebecca Ghilardi / Filippo Ambrosini	1323	2017/2018 season (100%)	0	0	0	203	0
34	ITA	Rebecca Ghilardi / Filippo Ambrosini	1323	2016/2017 season (70%)	205	0	0	170	142
35	JPN	Miu Suzaki / Ryuichi Kihara	1283	2018/2019 season (100%)	0	191	191	0	0
35	JPN	Miu Suzaki / Ryuichi Kihara	1283	2017/2018 season (100%)	402	191	0	0	0
35	JPN	Miu Suzaki / Ryuichi Kihara	1283	2016/2017 season (70%)	166	0	0	142	0
36	RUS	Anastasia Poluianova / Dmitry Sopot	1130	2018/2019 season (100%)	0	230	225	0	0
36	RUS	Anastasia Poluianova / Dmitry Sopot	1130	2017/2018 season (100%)	0	225	207	243	0
36	RUS	Anastasia Poluianova / Dmitry Sopot	1130	2016/2017 season (70%)	0	0	0	0	0
37	USA	Sarah Feng / TJ Nyman	1038	2018/2019 season (100%)	328	203	148	0	0
37	USA	Sarah Feng / TJ Nyman	1038	2017/2018 season (100%)	239	120	0	0	0
37	USA	Sarah Feng / TJ Nyman	1038	2016/2017 season (70%)	0	0	0	0	0
38	CHN	Tang Feiyao / Yang Yongchao	1001	2018/2019 season (100%)	365	164	133	0	0
38	CHN	Tang Feiyao / Yang Yongchao	1001	2017/2018 season (100%)	157	182	0	0	0
38	CHN	Tang Feiyao / Yang Yongchao	1001	2016/2017 season (70%)	0	0	0	0	0
39	JPN	Riku Miura / Shoya Ichihashi	961	2018/2019 season (100%)	127	182	133	0	0
39	JPN	Riku Miura / Shoya Ichihashi	961	2017/2018 season (100%)	325	97	97	0	0
39	JPN	Riku Miura / Shoya Ichihashi	961	2016/2017 season (70%)	99	0	0	0	0
40	USA	Laiken Lockley / Keenan Prochnow	953	2018/2019 season (100%)	295	182	148	0	0
40	USA	Laiken Lockley / Keenan Prochnow	953	2017/2018 season (100%)	0	164	164	0	0
40	USA	Laiken Lockley / Keenan Prochnow	953	2016/2017 season (70%)	0	0	0	0	0
41	CAN	Lori-Ann Matte / Thierry Ferland	915	2018/2019 season (100%)	0	0	0	198	0
41	CAN	Lori-Ann Matte / Thierry Ferland	915	2017/2018 season (100%)	215	120	0	0	0
41	CAN	Lori-Ann Matte / Thierry Ferland	915	2016/2017 season (70%)	151	127	104	0	0
42	FRA	Cléo Hamon / Denys Strekalin	821	2018/2019 season (100%)	215	164	148	0	0
42	FRA	Cléo Hamon / Denys Strekalin	821	2017/2018 season (100%)	174	120	0	0	0
42	FRA	Cléo Hamon / Denys Strekalin	821	2016/2017 season (70%)	89	0	0	0	0
43	GER	Talisa Thomalla / Robert Kunkel	748	2018/2019 season (100%)	157	108	0	0	0
43	GER	Talisa Thomalla / Robert Kunkel	748	2017/2018 season (100%)	266	120	97	0	0
43	GER	Talisa Thomalla / Robert Kunkel	748	2016/2017 season (70%)	110	0	0	0	0
44	RUS	Kseniia Akhanteva / Valerii Kolesov	746	2018/2019 season (100%)	0	255	250	0	0
44	RUS	Kseniia Akhanteva / Valerii Kolesov	746	2017/2018 season (100%)	0	148	0	0	0
44	RUS	Kseniia Akhanteva / Valerii Kolesov	746	2016/2017 season (70%)	0	93	0	0	0
45	USA	Jessica Pfund / Joshua Santillan	704	2018/2019 season (100%)	0	0	0	0	0
45	USA	Jessica Pfund / Joshua Santillan	704	2017/2018 season (100%)	0	0	0	219	198
45	USA	Jessica Pfund / Joshua Santillan	704	2016/2017 season (70%)	0	134	0	153	0
46	USA	Nica Digerness / Danny Neudecker	695	2018/2019 season (100%)	0	236	0	219	0
46	USA	Nica Digerness / Danny Neudecker	695	2017/2018 season (100%)	0	0	0	0	0
46	USA	Nica Digerness / Danny Neudecker	695	2016/2017 season (70%)	136	104	0	0	0
47	SUI	Ioulia Chtchetinina / Mikhail Akulov	681	2018/2019 season (100%)	0	0	0	0	0
47	SUI	Ioulia Chtchetinina / Mikhail Akulov	681	2017/2018 season (100%)	237	0	0	225	219
47	SUI	Ioulia Chtchetinina / Mikhail Akulov	681	2016/2017 season (70%)	0	0	0	0	0
48	KOR	Kim Kyu-eun / Alex Kang-chan Kam	674	2018/2019 season (100%)	0	0	0	0	0
48	KOR	Kim Kyu-eun / Alex Kang-chan Kam	674	2017/2018 season (100%)	0	0	0	203	198
48	KOR	Kim Kyu-eun / Alex Kang-chan Kam	674	2016/2017 season (70%)	134	0	0	139	0
49	UKR	Sofiia Nesterova / Artem Darenskyi	650	2018/2019 season (100%)	239	164	120	0	0
49	UKR	Sofiia Nesterova / Artem Darenskyi	650	2017/2018 season (100%)	127	0	0	0	0
49	UKR	Sofiia Nesterova / Artem Darenskyi	650	2016/2017 season (70%)	0	0	0	0	0
50	ISR	Hailey Kops / Artem Tsoglin	628	2018/2019 season (100%)	266	0	0	164	0
50	ISR	Hailey Kops / Artem Tsoglin	628	2017/2018 season (100%)	103	0	0	0	0
50	ISR	Hailey Kops / Artem Tsoglin	628	2016/2017 season (70%)	122	76	0	0	0
51	CZE	Hanna Abrazhevich / Martin Bidař	546	2018/2019 season (100%)	200	0	0	182	164
51	CZE	Hanna Abrazhevich / Martin Bidař	546	2017/2018 season (100%)	0	0	0	0	0
51	CZE	Hanna Abrazhevich / Martin Bidař	546	2016/2017 season (70%)	0	0	0	0	0
52	RUS	Yuko Kavaguti / Alexander Smirnov	537	2018/2019 season (100%)	0	0	0	0	0
52	RUS	Yuko Kavaguti / Alexander Smirnov	537	2017/2018 season (100%)	0	0	0	0	0
52	RUS	Yuko Kavaguti / Alexander Smirnov	537	2016/2017 season (70%)	0	183	165	189	0
53	USA	Jessica Calalang / Brian Johnson	462	2018/2019 season (100%)	0	0	0	243	219
53	USA	Jessica Calalang / Brian Johnson	462	2017/2018 season (100%)	0	0	0	0	0
53	USA	Jessica Calalang / Brian Johnson	462	2016/2017 season (70%)	0	0	0	0	0
54	CAN	Brooke McIntosh / Brandon Toste	455	2018/2019 season (100%)	194	164	97	0	0
54	CAN	Brooke McIntosh / Brandon Toste	455	2017/2018 season (100%)	0	0	0	0	0
54	CAN	Brooke McIntosh / Brandon Toste	455	2016/2017 season (70%)	0	0	0	0	0
55	LTU	Goda Butkutė / Nikita Ermolaev	446	2018/2019 season (100%)	0	0	0	0	0
55	LTU	Goda Butkutė / Nikita Ermolaev	446	2017/2018 season (100%)	0	0	0	0	0
55	LTU	Goda Butkutė / Nikita Ermolaev	446	2016/2017 season (70%)	0	134	0	170	142
56	CHN	Wang Xuehan / Wang Lei	431	2018/2019 season (100%)	0	0	0	0	0
56	CHN	Wang Xuehan / Wang Lei	431	2017/2018 season (100%)	0	0	0	0	0
56	CHN	Wang Xuehan / Wang Lei	431	2016/2017 season (70%)	0	227	204	0	0
57	CAN	Brittany Jones / Joshua Reagan	359	2018/2019 season (100%)	0	0	0	0	0
57	CAN	Brittany Jones / Joshua Reagan	359	2017/2018 season (100%)	0	0	0	0	0
57	CAN	Brittany Jones / Joshua Reagan	359	2016/2017 season (70%)	0	149	0	210	0
58	FRA	Camille Mendoza / Pavel Kovalev	351	2018/2019 season (100%)	0	0	0	0	0
58	FRA	Camille Mendoza / Pavel Kovalev	351	2017/2018 season (100%)	0	0	0	198	0
58	FRA	Camille Mendoza / Pavel Kovalev	351	2016/2017 season (70%)	0	0	0	153	0
58	RUS	Daria Kvartalova / Alexei Sviatchenko	351	2018/2019 season (100%)	0	203	0	0	0
58	RUS	Daria Kvartalova / Alexei Sviatchenko	351	2017/2018 season (100%)	0	148	0	0	0
58	RUS	Daria Kvartalova / Alexei Sviatchenko	351	2016/2017 season (70%)	0	0	0	0	0
60	SUI	Alexandra Herbríková / Nicolas Roulet	322	2018/2019 season (100%)	0	0	0	164	0
60	SUI	Alexandra Herbríková / Nicolas Roulet	322	2017/2018 season (100%)	0	0	0	0	0
60	SUI	Alexandra Herbríková / Nicolas Roulet	322	2016/2017 season (70%)	0	0	0	158	0
61	CAN	Patricia Andrew / Paxton Fletcher	315	2018/2019 season (100%)	0	182	133	0	0
61	CAN	Patricia Andrew / Paxton Fletcher	315	2017/2018 season (100%)	0	0	0	0	0
61	CAN	Patricia Andrew / Paxton Fletcher	315	2016/2017 season (70%)	0	0	0	0	0
62	USA	Kate Finster / Balazs Nagy	282	2018/2019 season (100%)	174	108	0	0	0
62	USA	Kate Finster / Balazs Nagy	282	2017/2018 season (100%)	0	0	0	0	0
62	USA	Kate Finster / Balazs Nagy	282	2016/2017 season (70%)	0	0	0	0	0
63	SVK	Tereza Zendulková / Simon Fukas	251	2018/2019 season (100%)	103	148	0	0	0
63	SVK	Tereza Zendulková / Simon Fukas	251	2017/2018 season (100%)	0	0	0	0	0
63	SVK	Tereza Zendulková / Simon Fukas	251	2016/2017 season (70%)	0	0	0	0	0
64	CHN	Zhang Yuyao / Jia Ziqi	241	2018/2019 season (100%)	0	0	0	0	0
64	CHN	Zhang Yuyao / Jia Ziqi	241	2017/2018 season (100%)	0	133	108	0	0
64	CHN	Zhang Yuyao / Jia Ziqi	241	2016/2017 season (70%)	0	0	0	0	0
64	CHN	Sun Jiaying / Guo Yunzhi	241	2018/2019 season (100%)	0	0	0	0	0
64	CHN	Sun Jiaying / Guo Yunzhi	241	2017/2018 season (100%)	0	133	108	0	0
64	CHN	Sun Jiaying / Guo Yunzhi	241	2016/2017 season (70%)	0	0	0	0	0
66	CAN	Gabrielle Levesque / Pier-Alexandre Hudon	12340	2018/2019 season (100%)	114	120	0	0	0
66	CAN	Gabrielle Levesque / Pier-Alexandre Hudon	12340	2017/2018 season (100%)	0	0	0	0	0
66	CAN	Gabrielle Levesque / Pier-Alexandre Hudon	12340	2016/2017 season (70%)	0	0	0	0	0
67	USA	Winter Deardorff / Max Settlage	219	2018/2019 season (100%)	0	0	0	219	0
67	USA	Winter Deardorff / Max Settlage	219	2017/2018 season (100%)	0	0	0	0	0
67	USA	Winter Deardorff / Max Settlage	219	2016/2017 season (70%)	0	0	0	0	0
68	CHN	Zhang Mingyang / Song Bowen	213	2018/2019 season (100%)	0	0	0	0	0
68	CHN	Zhang Mingyang / Song Bowen	213	2017/2018 season (100%)	0	213	0	0	0
68	CHN	Zhang Mingyang / Song Bowen	213	2016/2017 season (70%)	0	0	0	0	0
69	RUS	Alina Pepeleva / Roman Pleshkov	203	2018/2019 season (100%)	0	203	0	0	0
69	RUS	Alina Pepeleva / Roman Pleshkov	203	2017/2018 season (100%)	0	0	0	0	0
69	RUS	Alina Pepeleva / Roman Pleshkov	203	2016/2017 season (70%)	0	0	0	0	0
69	ISR	Anna Vernikov / Evgeni Krasnopolski	203	2018/2019 season (100%)	0	0	0	203	0
69	ISR	Anna Vernikov / Evgeni Krasnopolski	203	2017/2018 season (100%)	0	0	0	0	0
69	ISR	Anna Vernikov / Evgeni Krasnopolski	203	2016/2017 season (70%)	0	0	0	0	0
71	ITA	Giulia Foresti / Edoardo Caputo	198	2018/2019 season (100%)	0	0	0	198	0
71	ITA	Giulia Foresti / Edoardo Caputo	198	2017/2018 season (100%)	0	0	0	0	0
71	ITA	Giulia Foresti / Edoardo Caputo	198	2016/2017 season (70%)	0	0	0	0	0
72	NED	Liubov Efimenko / Dmitry Epstein	182	2018/2019 season (100%)	0	0	0	182	0
72	NED	Liubov Efimenko / Dmitry Epstein	182	2017/2018 season (100%)	0	0	0	0	0
72	NED	Liubov Efimenko / Dmitry Epstein	182	2016/2017 season (70%)	0	0	0	0	0
72	RUS	Karina Akapova / Maksim Shagalov	198	2018/2019 season (100%)	0	0	0	182	0
72	RUS	Karina Akapova / Maksim Shagalov	198	2017/2018 season (100%)	0	0	0	0	0
72	RUS	Karina Akapova / Maksim Shagalov	198	2016/2017 season (70%)	0	0	0	0	0
74	FRA	Coline Keriven / Antoine Pierre	164	2018/2019 season (100%)	0	0	0	0	0
74	FRA	Coline Keriven / Antoine Pierre	164	2017/2018 season (100%)	0	0	0	164	0
74	FRA	Coline Keriven / Antoine Pierre	164	2016/2017 season (70%)	0	0	0	0	0
75	PRK	Pak So-hyang / Song Nam-i	158	2018/2019 season (100%)	0	0	0	0	0
75	PRK	Pak So-hyang / Song Nam-i	158	2017/2018 season (100%)	0	0	0	0	0
75	PRK	Pak So-hyang / Song Nam-i	158	2016/2017 season (70%)	0	0	0	158	0
76	ITA	Vivienne Contarino / Marco Pauletti	141	2018/2019 season (100%)	141	0	0	0	0
76	ITA	Vivienne Contarino / Marco Pauletti	141	2017/2018 season (100%)	0	0	0	0	0
76	ITA	Vivienne Contarino / Marco Pauletti	141	2016/2017 season (70%)	0	0	0	0	0
77	USA	Erika Smith / Aj Reiss	139	2018/2019 season (100%)	0	0	0	0	0
77	USA	Erika Smith / Aj Reiss	139	2017/2018 season (100%)	0	0	0	0	0
77	USA	Erika Smith / Aj Reiss	139	2016/2017 season (70%)	0	0	0	139	0
78	CAN	Chloe Choinard / Mathieu Ostiguy	133	2018/2019 season (100%)	0	0	0	0	0
78	CAN	Chloe Choinard / Mathieu Ostiguy	133	2017/2018 season (100%)	0	133	0	0	0
78	CAN	Chloe Choinard / Mathieu Ostiguy	133	2016/2017 season (70%)	0	0	0	0	0
78	BLR	Darya Rabkova / Vladyslav Gresko	133	2018/2019 season (100%)	0	133	0	0	0
78	BLR	Darya Rabkova / Vladyslav Gresko	133	2017/2018 season (100%)	0	0	0	0	0
78	BLR	Darya Rabkova / Vladyslav Gresko	133	2016/2017 season (70%)	0	0	0	0	0
80	RUS	Bogdana Lukashevich / Alexander Stepanov	127	2018/2019 season (100%)	0	0	0	0	0
80	RUS	Bogdana Lukashevich / Alexander Stepanov	127	2017/2018 season (100%)	0	0	0	0	0
80	RUS	Bogdana Lukashevich / Alexander Stepanov	127	2016/2017 season (70%)	0	0	0	127	0
81	CHN	Wang Yuchen / Huang Yihang	120	2018/2019 season (100%)	0	120	0	0	0
81	CHN	Wang Yuchen / Huang Yihang	120	2017/2018 season (100%)	0	0	0	0	0
81	CHN	Wang Yuchen / Huang Yihang	120	2016/2017 season (70%)	0	0	0	0	0
82	CAN	Chloe Panetta / Benjamin Mimar	108	2018/2019 season (100%)	0	108	0	0	0
82	CAN	Chloe Panetta / Benjamin Mimar	108	2017/2018 season (100%)	0	0	0	0	0
82	CAN	Chloe Panetta / Benjamin Mimar	108	2016/2017 season (70%)	0	0	0	0	0
83	CHN	Liu Motong / Wang Tianze	97	2018/2019 season (100%)	0	97	0	0	0
83	CHN	Liu Motong / Wang Tianze	97	2017/2018 season (100%)	0	0	0	0	0
83	CHN	Liu Motong / Wang Tianze	97	2016/2017 season (70%)	0	0	0	0	0
83	CAN	Camille Perreault / Bryan Pierro	97	2018/2019 season (100%)	0	97	0	0	0
83	CAN	Camille Perreault / Bryan Pierro	97	2017/2018 season (100%)	0	0	0	0	0
83	CAN	Camille Perreault / Bryan Pierro	97	2016/2017 season (70%)	0	0	0	0	0
83	CAN	Olivia Boys-Eddy / Mackenzie Boys-Eddy	97	2018/2019 season (100%)	0	0	0	0	0
83	CAN	Olivia Boys-Eddy / Mackenzie Boys-Eddy	97	2017/2018 season (100%)	0	97	0	0	0
83	CAN	Olivia Boys-Eddy / Mackenzie Boys-Eddy	97	2016/2017 season (70%)	0	0	0	0	0
86	CAN	Gabriella Marvaldi / Daniel Villeneuve	93	2018/2019 season (100%)	0	0	0	0	0
86	CAN	Gabriella Marvaldi / Daniel Villeneuve	93	2017/2018 season (100%)	0	0	0	0	0
86	CAN	Gabriella Marvaldi / Daniel Villeneuve	93	2016/2017 season (70%)	0	93	0	0	0
87	CAN	Jamie Knoblauch / Cody Wong	68	2018/2019 season (100%)	0	0	0	0	0
87	CAN	Jamie Knoblauch / Cody Wong	68	2017/2018 season (100%)	0	0	0	0	0
87	CAN	Jamie Knoblauch / Cody Wong	68	2016/2017 season (70%)	0	68	0	0	0

=== Ice dance ===
As of April 9, 2019.

Rank	Nation	Couple	Points	Season	ISU Championships or Olympics	(Junior) Grand Prix and Final		Selected International Competition	
Rank	Nation	Couple	Points	Season	Best	Best	2nd Best	Best	2nd Best
1	USA	Madison Hubbell / Zachary Donohue	5202	2018/2019 season (100%)	972	800	400	300	0
1	USA	Madison Hubbell / Zachary Donohue	5202	2017/2018 season (100%)	1080	583	360	300	0
1	USA	Madison Hubbell / Zachary Donohue	5202	2016/2017 season (70%)	428	368	252	210	189
2	FRA	Gabriella Papadakis / Guillaume Cizeron	4804	2018/2019 season (100%)	1200	400	0	0	0
2	FRA	Gabriella Papadakis / Guillaume Cizeron	4804	2017/2018 season (100%)	1200	800	400	300	0
2	FRA	Gabriella Papadakis / Guillaume Cizeron	4804	2016/2017 season (70%)	756	504	280	0	0
3	CAN	Tessa Virtue / Scott Moir	4510	2018/2019 season (100%)	0	0	0	0	0
3	CAN	Tessa Virtue / Scott Moir	4510	2017/2018 season (100%)	1200	720	400	300	0
3	CAN	Tessa Virtue / Scott Moir	4510	2016/2017 season (70%)	840	560	280	210	0
4	RUS	Alexandra Stepanova / Ivan Bukin	3966	2018/2019 season (100%)	875	583	400	300	0
4	RUS	Alexandra Stepanova / Ivan Bukin	3966	2017/2018 season (100%)	680	324	324	270	0
4	RUS	Alexandra Stepanova / Ivan Bukin	3966	2016/2017 season (70%)	386	227	183	210	0
5	ITA	Charlène Guignard / Marco Fabbri	3933	2018/2019 season (100%)	680	648	360	300	300
5	ITA	Charlène Guignard / Marco Fabbri	3933	2017/2018 season (100%)	551	262	262	300	270
5	ITA	Charlène Guignard / Marco Fabbri	3933	2016/2017 season (70%)	347	204	204	210	210
6	RUS	Ekaterina Bobrova / Dmitri Soloviev	3730	2018/2019 season (100%)	0	0	0	0	0
6	RUS	Ekaterina Bobrova / Dmitri Soloviev	3730	2017/2018 season (100%)	787	360	324	300	300
6	RUS	Ekaterina Bobrova / Dmitri Soloviev	3730	2016/2017 season (70%)	551	408	280	210	210
7	USA	Madison Chock / Evan Bates	3722	2018/2019 season (100%)	840	0	0	250	0
7	USA	Madison Chock / Evan Bates	3722	2017/2018 season (100%)	787	525	360	0	0
7	USA	Madison Chock / Evan Bates	3722	2016/2017 season (70%)	476	330	252	189	189
8	USA	Kaitlin Hawayek / Jean-Luc Baker	3708	2018/2019 season (100%)	551	472	400	0	0
8	USA	Kaitlin Hawayek / Jean-Luc Baker	3708	2017/2018 season (100%)	840	292	262	270	243
8	USA	Kaitlin Hawayek / Jean-Luc Baker	3708	2016/2017 season (70%)	0	204	165	189	189
9	CAN	Piper Gilles / Paul Poirier	3634	2018/2019 season (100%)	680	324	324	300	300
9	CAN	Piper Gilles / Paul Poirier	3634	2017/2018 season (100%)	709	292	292	243	0
9	CAN	Piper Gilles / Paul Poirier	3634	2016/2017 season (70%)	402	227	227	170	0
10	RUS	Victoria Sinitsina / Nikita Katsalapov	3547	2018/2019 season (100%)	1080	720	360	300	0
10	RUS	Victoria Sinitsina / Nikita Katsalapov	3547	2017/2018 season (100%)	0	324	292	243	0
10	RUS	Victoria Sinitsina / Nikita Katsalapov	3547	2016/2017 season (70%)	228	204	183	0	0
11	CAN	Kaitlyn Weaver / Andrew Poje	3460	2018/2019 season (100%)	787	0	0	300	0
11	CAN	Kaitlyn Weaver / Andrew Poje	3460	2017/2018 season (100%)	972	360	292	270	0
11	CAN	Kaitlyn Weaver / Andrew Poje	3460	2016/2017 season (70%)	613	252	227	0	0
12	USA	Maia Shibutani / Alex Shibutani	3434	2018/2019 season (100%)	0	0	0	0	0
12	USA	Maia Shibutani / Alex Shibutani	3434	2017/2018 season (100%)	972	648	400	0	0
12	USA	Maia Shibutani / Alex Shibutani	3434	2016/2017 season (70%)	680	454	280	0	0
13	ITA	Anna Cappellini / Luca Lanotte	3352	2018/2019 season (100%)	0	0	0	0	0
13	ITA	Anna Cappellini / Luca Lanotte	3352	2017/2018 season (100%)	875	472	360	300	0
13	ITA	Anna Cappellini / Luca Lanotte	3352	2016/2017 season (70%)	529	227	204	210	175
14	USA	Lorraine McNamara / Quinn Carpenter	2935	2018/2019 season (100%)	0	324	292	270	270
14	USA	Lorraine McNamara / Quinn Carpenter	2935	2017/2018 season (100%)	612	262	0	270	250
14	USA	Lorraine McNamara / Quinn Carpenter	2935	2016/2017 season (70%)	186	199	175	0	0
15	USA	Rachel Parsons / Michael Parsons	2925	2018/2019 season (100%)	0	324	262	270	270
15	USA	Rachel Parsons / Michael Parsons	2925	2017/2018 season (100%)	496	213	0	270	225
15	USA	Rachel Parsons / Michael Parsons	2925	2016/2017 season (70%)	350	245	175	0	0
16	RUS	Tiffany Zahorski / Jonathan Guerreiro	2874	2018/2019 season (100%)	0	525	360	250	0
16	RUS	Tiffany Zahorski / Jonathan Guerreiro	2874	2017/2018 season (100%)	574	292	236	270	178
16	RUS	Tiffany Zahorski / Jonathan Guerreiro	2874	2016/2017 season (70%)	0	183	0	189	170
17	POL	Natalia Kaliszek / Maksym Spodyriev	2811	2018/2019 season (100%)	551	262	236	270	243
17	POL	Natalia Kaliszek / Maksym Spodyriev	2811	2017/2018 season (100%)	325	191	0	300	250
17	POL	Natalia Kaliszek / Maksym Spodyriev	2811	2016/2017 season (70%)	281	183	149	175	153
18	CHN	Wang Shiyue / Liu Xinyu	2640	2018/2019 season (100%)	446	236	236	300	219
18	CHN	Wang Shiyue / Liu Xinyu	2640	2017/2018 season (100%)	551	236	191	225	0
18	CHN	Wang Shiyue / Liu Xinyu	2640	2016/2017 season (70%)	312	165	0	0	0
19	USA	Christina Carreira / Anthony Ponomarenko	2455	2018/2019 season (100%)	0	324	262	300	270
19	USA	Christina Carreira / Anthony Ponomarenko	2455	2017/2018 season (100%)	450	315	250	0	0
19	USA	Christina Carreira / Anthony Ponomarenko	2455	2016/2017 season (70%)	284	178	158	0	0
20	ESP	Olivia Smart / Adrián Díaz	2447	2018/2019 season (100%)	402	262	213	270	270
20	ESP	Olivia Smart / Adrián Díaz	2447	2017/2018 season (100%)	377	236	0	219	198
20	ESP	Olivia Smart / Adrián Díaz	2447	2016/2017 season (70%)	140	0	0	175	158
21	FRA	Marie-Jade Lauriault / Romain Le Gac	2441	2018/2019 season (100%)	325	292	236	243	243
21	FRA	Marie-Jade Lauriault / Romain Le Gac	2441	2017/2018 season (100%)	339	191	191	203	178
21	FRA	Marie-Jade Lauriault / Romain Le Gac	2441	2016/2017 season (70%)	185	165	165	175	139
22	ESP	Sara Hurtado / Kirill Khaliavin	2387	2018/2019 season (100%)	446	360	292	243	0
22	ESP	Sara Hurtado / Kirill Khaliavin	2387	2017/2018 season (100%)	402	0	0	250	219
22	ESP	Sara Hurtado / Kirill Khaliavin	2387	2016/2017 season (70%)	166	0	0	175	158
23	CAN	Carolane Soucisse / Shane Firus	2301	2018/2019 season (100%)	0	262	191	243	219
23	CAN	Carolane Soucisse / Shane Firus	2301	2017/2018 season (100%)	756	213	0	219	198
23	CAN	Carolane Soucisse / Shane Firus	2301	2016/2017 season (70%)	0	0	0	0	0
24	CAN	Laurence Fournier Beaudry / Nikolaj Sørensen	2203	2018/2019 season (100%)	496	0	0	0	0
24	CAN	Laurence Fournier Beaudry / Nikolaj Sørensen	2203	2017/2018 season (100%)	362	262	0	243	219
24	CAN	Laurence Fournier Beaudry / Nikolaj Sørensen	2203	2016/2017 season (70%)	312	149	149	170	153
25	JPN	Kana Muramoto / Chris Reed	2124	2018/2019 season (100%)	0	0	0	0	0
25	JPN	Kana Muramoto / Chris Reed	2124	2017/2018 season (100%)	680	213	0	270	243
25	JPN	Kana Muramoto / Chris Reed	2124	2016/2017 season (70%)	253	134	0	189	142
26	GBR	Lilah Fear / Lewis Gibson	2076	2018/2019 season (100%)	496	292	262	219	198
26	GBR	Lilah Fear / Lewis Gibson	2076	2017/2018 season (100%)	0	0	0	250	225
26	GBR	Lilah Fear / Lewis Gibson	2076	2016/2017 season (70%)	134	0	0	189	158
27	UKR	Oleksandra Nazarova / Maxim Nikitin	2040	2018/2019 season (100%)	162	191	0	250	0
27	UKR	Oleksandra Nazarova / Maxim Nikitin	2040	2017/2018 season (100%)	293	236	0	250	243
27	UKR	Oleksandra Nazarova / Maxim Nikitin	2040	2016/2017 season (70%)	253	149	0	175	142
28	RUS	Anastasia Skoptcova / Kirill Aleshin	1971	2018/2019 season (100%)	0	213	0	270	0
28	RUS	Anastasia Skoptcova / Kirill Aleshin	1971	2017/2018 season (100%)	500	350	250	0	0
28	RUS	Anastasia Skoptcova / Kirill Aleshin	1971	2016/2017 season (70%)	230	158	142	0	0
29	CAN	Marjorie Lajoie / Zachary Lagha	1845	2018/2019 season (100%)	500	255	250	0	0
29	CAN	Marjorie Lajoie / Zachary Lagha	1845	2017/2018 season (100%)	365	250	225	0	0
29	CAN	Marjorie Lajoie / Zachary Lagha	1845	2016/2017 season (70%)	207	127	127	0	0
30	RUS	Sofia Shevchenko / Igor Eremenko	1838	2018/2019 season (100%)	405	350	250	0	0
30	RUS	Sofia Shevchenko / Igor Eremenko	1838	2017/2018 season (100%)	328	255	250	0	0
30	RUS	Sofia Shevchenko / Igor Eremenko	1838	2016/2017 season (70%)	0	142	115	0	0
31	RUS	Arina Ushakova / Maxim Nekrasov	1778	2018/2019 season (100%)	328	315	250	0	0
31	RUS	Arina Ushakova / Maxim Nekrasov	1778	2017/2018 season (100%)	405	250	230	0	0
31	RUS	Arina Ushakova / Maxim Nekrasov	1778	2016/2017 season (70%)	0	142	142	0	0
32	JPN	Misato Komatsubara / Tim Koleto	1737	2018/2019 season (100%)	362	191	191	243	243
32	JPN	Misato Komatsubara / Tim Koleto	1737	2017/2018 season (100%)	325	0	0	182	0
32	JPN	Misato Komatsubara / Tim Koleto	1737	2016/2017 season (70%)	0	0	0	0	0
33	RUS	Betina Popova / Sergey Mozgov	1676	2018/2019 season (100%)	0	213	191	250	243
33	RUS	Betina Popova / Sergey Mozgov	1676	2017/2018 season (100%)	0	236	0	300	243
33	RUS	Betina Popova / Sergey Mozgov	1676	2016/2017 season (70%)	0	0	0	139	0
34	UKR	Darya Popova / Volodymyr Byelikov	1671	2018/2019 season (100%)	174	203	182	203	198
34	UKR	Darya Popova / Volodymyr Byelikov	1671	2017/2018 season (100%)	174	164	148	225	0
34	UKR	Darya Popova / Volodymyr Byelikov	1671	2016/2017 season (70%)	110	93	84	0	0
35	RUS	Sofia Evdokimova / Egor Bazin	1576	2018/2019 season (100%)	362	292	0	250	250
35	RUS	Sofia Evdokimova / Egor Bazin	1576	2017/2018 season (100%)	0	0	0	219	203
35	RUS	Sofia Evdokimova / Egor Bazin	1576	2016/2017 season (70%)	0	0	0	142	0
36	HUN	Anna Yanovskaya / Ádám Lukács	1483	2018/2019 season (100%)	180	213	0	250	198
36	HUN	Anna Yanovskaya / Ádám Lukács	1483	2017/2018 season (100%)	214	0	0	225	203
36	HUN	Anna Yanovskaya / Ádám Lukács	1483	2016/2017 season (70%)	0	0	0	0	0
37	ITA	Jasmine Tessari / Francesco Fioretti	1464	2018/2019 season (100%)	214	191	0	250	219
37	ITA	Jasmine Tessari / Francesco Fioretti	1464	2017/2018 season (100%)	140	0	0	225	225
37	ITA	Jasmine Tessari / Francesco Fioretti	1464	2016/2017 season (70%)	0	0	0	142	139
38	RUS	Elizaveta Khudaiberdieva / Nikita Nazarov	1412	2018/2019 season (100%)	450	284	250	0	0
38	RUS	Elizaveta Khudaiberdieva / Nikita Nazarov	1412	2017/2018 season (100%)	0	225	203	0	0
38	RUS	Elizaveta Khudaiberdieva / Nikita Nazarov	1412	2016/2017 season (70%)	0	0	0	0	0
39	LTU	Allison Reed / Saulius Ambrulevičius	1366	2018/2019 season (100%)	237	236	0	225	164
39	LTU	Allison Reed / Saulius Ambrulevičius	1366	2017/2018 season (100%)	162	0	0	178	164
39	LTU	Allison Reed / Saulius Ambrulevičius	1366	2016/2017 season (70%)	0	0	0	0	0
40	FIN	Juulia Turkkila / Matthias Versluis	1285	2018/2019 season (100%)	293	236	0	225	203
40	FIN	Juulia Turkkila / Matthias Versluis	1285	2017/2018 season (100%)	0	0	0	164	164
40	FIN	Juulia Turkkila / Matthias Versluis	1285	2016/2017 season (70%)	0	0	0	0	0
41	RUS	Anastasia Shpilevaya / Grigory Smirnov	1266	2018/2019 season (100%)	0	0	0	250	219
41	RUS	Anastasia Shpilevaya / Grigory Smirnov	1266	2017/2018 season (100%)	0	225	0	0	0
41	RUS	Anastasia Shpilevaya / Grigory Smirnov	1266	2016/2017 season (70%)	256	158	158	0	0
42	GBR	Penny Coomes / Nicholas Buckland	1209	2018/2019 season (100%)	0	0	0	0	0
42	GBR	Penny Coomes / Nicholas Buckland	1209	2017/2018 season (100%)	446	213	0	300	250
42	GBR	Penny Coomes / Nicholas Buckland	1209	2016/2017 season (70%)	0	0	0	0	0
43	USA	Avonley Nguyen / Vadym Kolesnik	1157	2018/2019 season (100%)	365	250	230	0	0
43	USA	Avonley Nguyen / Vadym Kolesnik	1157	2017/2018 season (100%)	0	164	148	0	0
43	USA	Avonley Nguyen / Vadym Kolesnik	1157	2016/2017 season (70%)	0	0	0	0	0
44	GER	Katharina Müller / Tim Dieck	1061	2018/2019 season (100%)	0	213	0	225	164
44	GER	Katharina Müller / Tim Dieck	1061	2017/2018 season (100%)	0	0	0	250	198
44	GER	Katharina Müller / Tim Dieck	1061	2016/2017 season (70%)	0	0	0	175	158
45	GER	Shari Koch / Christian Nüchtern	1050	2018/2019 season (100%)	200	0	0	225	219
45	GER	Shari Koch / Christian Nüchtern	1050	2017/2018 season (100%)	0	0	0	203	203
45	GER	Shari Koch / Christian Nüchtern	1050	2016/2017 season (70%)	0	0	0	127	0
46	FIN	Cecilia Törn / Jussiville Partanen	1046	2018/2019 season (100%)	0	0	0	0	0
46	FIN	Cecilia Törn / Jussiville Partanen	1046	2017/2018 season (100%)	192	0	0	250	198
46	FIN	Cecilia Törn / Jussiville Partanen	1046	2016/2017 season (70%)	109	0	0	170	127
47	USA	Caroline Green / Gordon Green	967	2018/2019 season (100%)	266	0	0	0	0
47	USA	Caroline Green / Gordon Green	967	2017/2018 season (100%)	295	203	203	0	0
47	USA	Caroline Green / Gordon Green	967	2016/2017 season (70%)	0	0	0	0	0
48	GEO	Maria Kazakova / Georgy Reviya	960	2018/2019 season (100%)	295	225	225	0	0
48	GEO	Maria Kazakova / Georgy Reviya	960	2017/2018 season (100%)	215	0	0	0	0
48	GEO	Maria Kazakova / Georgy Reviya	960	2016/2017 season (70%)	0	0	0	0	0
49	AUS	Chantelle Kerry / Andrew Dodds	945	2018/2019 season (100%)	325	0	0	219	164
49	AUS	Chantelle Kerry / Andrew Dodds	945	2017/2018 season (100%)	237	0	0	0	0
49	AUS	Chantelle Kerry / Andrew Dodds	945	2016/2017 season (70%)	0	0	0	0	0
50	FRA	Loicia Demougeot / Theo Le Mercier	916	2018/2019 season (100%)	239	182	164	0	0
50	FRA	Loicia Demougeot / Theo Le Mercier	916	2017/2018 season (100%)	114	120	97	0	0
50	FRA	Loicia Demougeot / Theo Le Mercier	916	2016/2017 season (70%)	0	84	0	0	0
51	GBR	Robynne Tweedale / Joseph Buckland	909	2018/2019 season (100%)	156	213	0	198	178
51	GBR	Robynne Tweedale / Joseph Buckland	909	2017/2018 season (100%)	0	0	0	164	0
51	GBR	Robynne Tweedale / Joseph Buckland	909	2016/2017 season (70%)	0	0	0	0	0
52	USA	Eliana Gropman / Ian Somerville	888	2018/2019 season (100%)	157	203	164	0	0
52	USA	Eliana Gropman / Ian Somerville	888	2017/2018 season (100%)	0	182	182	0	0
52	USA	Eliana Gropman / Ian Somerville	888	2016/2017 season (70%)	0	76	0	0	0
53	BLR	Emiliya Kalehanova / Uladzislau Palkhouski	887	2018/2019 season (100%)	114	148	108	164	0
53	BLR	Emiliya Kalehanova / Uladzislau Palkhouski	887	2017/2018 season (100%)	0	148	133	0	0
53	BLR	Emiliya Kalehanova / Uladzislau Palkhouski	887	2016/2017 season (70%)	72	68	0	0	0
54	USA	Chloe Lewis / Logan Bye	840	2018/2019 season (100%)	0	0	0	0	0
54	USA	Chloe Lewis / Logan Bye	840	2017/2018 season (100%)	266	164	164	0	0
54	USA	Chloe Lewis / Logan Bye	840	2016/2017 season (70%)	0	142	104	0	0
55	FRA	Natacha Lagouge / Corentin Rahier	795	2018/2019 season (100%)	0	0	0	0	0
55	FRA	Natacha Lagouge / Corentin Rahier	795	2017/2018 season (100%)	239	203	0	0	0
55	FRA	Natacha Lagouge / Corentin Rahier	795	2016/2017 season (70%)	122	127	104	0	0
56	CAN	Haley Sales / Nikolas Wamsteeker	784	2018/2019 season (100%)	0	0	0	219	203
56	CAN	Haley Sales / Nikolas Wamsteeker	784	2017/2018 season (100%)	362	0	0	0	0
56	CAN	Haley Sales / Nikolas Wamsteeker	784	2016/2017 season (70%)	0	0	0	0	0
57	CZE	Cortney Mansourová / Michal Češka	781	2018/2019 season (100%)	0	0	0	0	0
57	CZE	Cortney Mansourová / Michal Češka	781	2017/2018 season (100%)	0	0	0	198	182
57	CZE	Cortney Mansourová / Michal Češka	781	2016/2017 season (70%)	0	134	0	142	125
58	CHN	Chen Hong / Sun Zhuoming	764	2018/2019 season (100%)	402	0	0	198	164
58	CHN	Chen Hong / Sun Zhuoming	764	2017/2018 season (100%)	0	0	0	0	0
58	CHN	Chen Hong / Sun Zhuoming	764	2016/2017 season (70%)	0	0	0	0	0
59	GER	Jennifer Urban / Benjamin Steffan	763	2018/2019 season (100%)	0	0	0	225	178
59	GER	Jennifer Urban / Benjamin Steffan	763	2017/2018 season (100%)	0	0	0	182	178
59	GER	Jennifer Urban / Benjamin Steffan	763	2016/2017 season (70%)	0	0	0	0	0
60	AUS	Matilda Friend / William Badaoui	751	2018/2019 season (100%)	264	108	97	0	0
60	AUS	Matilda Friend / William Badaoui	751	2017/2018 season (100%)	214	0	0	0	0
60	AUS	Matilda Friend / William Badaoui	751	2016/2017 season (70%)	134	68	0	0	0
61	JPN	Rikako Fukase / Aru Tateno	728	2018/2019 season (100%)	0	0	0	0	0
61	JPN	Rikako Fukase / Aru Tateno	728	2017/2018 season (100%)	293	0	0	164	0
61	JPN	Rikako Fukase / Aru Tateno	728	2016/2017 season (70%)	99	104	68	0	0
62	ISR	Shira Ichilov / Vadim Davidovich	718	2018/2019 season (100%)	113	0	0	182	0
62	ISR	Shira Ichilov / Vadim Davidovich	718	2017/2018 season (100%)	93	182	148	0	0
62	ISR	Shira Ichilov / Vadim Davidovich	718	2016/2017 season (70%)	0	0	0	0	0
63	CAN	Ellie Fisher / Simon-Pierre Malette-Paquette	713	2018/2019 season (100%)	0	203	164	0	0
63	CAN	Ellie Fisher / Simon-Pierre Malette-Paquette	713	2017/2018 season (100%)	0	182	164	0	0
63	CAN	Ellie Fisher / Simon-Pierre Malette-Paquette	713	2016/2017 season (70%)	0	0	0	0	0
64	CHN	Ning Wanqi / Wang Chao	696	2018/2019 season (100%)	293	0	0	198	0
64	CHN	Ning Wanqi / Wang Chao	696	2017/2018 season (100%)	0	108	97	0	0
64	CHN	Ning Wanqi / Wang Chao	696	2016/2017 season (70%)	0	0	0	0	0
65	POL	Justyna Plutowska / Jérémie Flemin	660	2018/2019 season (100%)	0	0	0	198	182
65	POL	Justyna Plutowska / Jérémie Flemin	660	2017/2018 season (100%)	0	0	0	0	0
65	POL	Justyna Plutowska / Jérémie Flemin	660	2016/2017 season (70%)	0	0	0	153	127
66	FRA	Adelina Galyavieva / Louis Thauron	649	2018/2019 season (100%)	264	0	0	203	182
66	FRA	Adelina Galyavieva / Louis Thauron	649	2017/2018 season (100%)	0	0	0	0	0
66	FRA	Adelina Galyavieva / Louis Thauron	649	2016/2017 season (70%)	0	0	0	0	0
67	ITA	Chiara Calderone / Pietro Papetti	647	2018/2019 season (100%)	0	0	0	225	0
67	ITA	Chiara Calderone / Pietro Papetti	647	2017/2018 season (100%)	141	148	133	0	0
67	ITA	Chiara Calderone / Pietro Papetti	647	2016/2017 season (70%)	0	0	0	0	0
68	GER	Ria Schwendinger / Valentin Wunderlich	627	2018/2019 season (100%)	0	0	0	0	0
68	GER	Ria Schwendinger / Valentin Wunderlich	627	2017/2018 season (100%)	194	120	0	0	0
68	GER	Ria Schwendinger / Valentin Wunderlich	627	2016/2017 season (70%)	136	93	84	0	0
69	UKR	Maria Golubtsova / Kirill Belobrov	591	2018/2019 season (100%)	0	164	164	0	0
69	UKR	Maria Golubtsova / Kirill Belobrov	591	2017/2018 season (100%)	0	148	108	0	0
69	UKR	Maria Golubtsova / Kirill Belobrov	591	2016/2017 season (70%)	0	115	104	0	0
70	RUS	Polina Ivanenko / Daniil Karpov	543	2018/2019 season (100%)	0	225	203	0	0
70	RUS	Polina Ivanenko / Daniil Karpov	543	2017/2018 season (100%)	0	0	0	0	0
70	RUS	Polina Ivanenko / Daniil Karpov	543	2016/2017 season (70%)	0	115	0	0	0
71	CAN	Alicia Fabbri / Paul Ayer	530	2018/2019 season (100%)	215	182	133	0	0
71	CAN	Alicia Fabbri / Paul Ayer	530	2017/2018 season (100%)	0	0	0	0	0
71	CAN	Alicia Fabbri / Paul Ayer	530	2016/2017 season (70%)	0	0	0	0	0
72	BLR	Anna Kublikova / Yuri Hulitski	504	2018/2019 season (100%)	140	0	0	182	182
72	BLR	Anna Kublikova / Yuri Hulitski	504	2017/2018 season (100%)	0	0	0	0	0
72	BLR	Anna Kublikova / Yuri Hulitski	504	2016/2017 season (70%)	0	0	0	0	0
73	USA	Karina Manta / Joseph Johnson	501	2018/2019 season (100%)	0	0	0	198	0
73	USA	Karina Manta / Joseph Johnson	501	2017/2018 season (100%)	0	0	0	164	0
73	USA	Karina Manta / Joseph Johnson	501	2016/2017 season (70%)	0	0	0	139	0
74	USA	Emma Gunter / Caleb Wein	496	2018/2019 season (100%)	0	133	133	0	0
74	USA	Emma Gunter / Caleb Wein	496	2017/2018 season (100%)	0	133	97	0	0
74	USA	Emma Gunter / Caleb Wein	496	2016/2017 season (70%)	0	93	0	0	0
75	GER	Charise Matthaei / Maximilian Pfisterer	492	2018/2019 season (100%)	93	108	108	0	0
75	GER	Charise Matthaei / Maximilian Pfisterer	492	2017/2018 season (100%)	75	108	0	0	0
75	GER	Charise Matthaei / Maximilian Pfisterer	492	2016/2017 season (70%)	0	0	0	0	0
76	CAN	Natalie D'Alessandro / Bruce Waddell	478	2018/2019 season (100%)	0	182	148	0	0
76	CAN	Natalie D'Alessandro / Bruce Waddell	478	2017/2018 season (100%)	0	148	0	0	0
76	CAN	Natalie D'Alessandro / Bruce Waddell	478	2016/2017 season (70%)	0	0	0	0	0
77	EST	Viktoria Semenjuk / Artur Gruzdev	428	2018/2019 season (100%)	103	97	0	0	0
77	EST	Viktoria Semenjuk / Artur Gruzdev	428	2017/2018 season (100%)	68	0	0	0	0
77	EST	Viktoria Semenjuk / Artur Gruzdev	428	2016/2017 season (70%)	0	84	76	0	0
78	GBR	Sasha Fear / George Waddell	421	2018/2019 season (100%)	83	108	0	0	0
78	GBR	Sasha Fear / George Waddell	421	2017/2018 season (100%)	0	133	97	0	0
78	GBR	Sasha Fear / George Waddell	421	2016/2017 season (70%)	0	0	0	0	0
79	RUS	Elizaveta Shanaeva / Devid Naryzhnyy	407	2018/2019 season (100%)	0	225	182	0	0
79	RUS	Elizaveta Shanaeva / Devid Naryzhnyy	407	2017/2018 season (100%)	0	0	0	0	0
79	RUS	Elizaveta Shanaeva / Devid Naryzhnyy	407	2016/2017 season (70%)	0	0	0	0	0
80	ITA	Francesca Righi / Aleksei Dubrovin	381	2018/2019 season (100%)	141	120	120	0	0
80	ITA	Francesca Righi / Aleksei Dubrovin	381	2017/2018 season (100%)	0	0	0	0	0
80	ITA	Francesca Righi / Aleksei Dubrovin	381	2016/2017 season (70%)	0	0	0	0	0
81	ITA	Carolina Moscheni / Andrea Fabbri	364	2018/2019 season (100%)	0	0	0	182	182
81	ITA	Carolina Moscheni / Andrea Fabbri	364	2017/2018 season (100%)	0	0	0	0	0
81	ITA	Carolina Moscheni / Andrea Fabbri	364	2016/2017 season (70%)	0	0	0	0	0
82	GBR	Emily Rose Brown / James Hernandez	363	2018/2019 season (100%)	0	133	97	0	0
82	GBR	Emily Rose Brown / James Hernandez	363	2017/2018 season (100%)	0	133	0	0	0
82	GBR	Emily Rose Brown / James Hernandez	363	2016/2017 season (70%)	0	0	0	0	0
83	CAN	Molly Lanaghan / Dmitre Razgulajevs	360	2018/2019 season (100%)	0	0	0	182	178
83	CAN	Molly Lanaghan / Dmitre Razgulajevs	360	2017/2018 season (100%)	0	0	0	0	0
83	CAN	Molly Lanaghan / Dmitre Razgulajevs	360	2016/2017 season (70%)	0	0	0	0	0
84	HUN	Emily Monaghan / Ilias Fourati	342	2018/2019 season (100%)	0	0	0	178	164
84	HUN	Emily Monaghan / Ilias Fourati	342	2017/2018 season (100%)	0	0	0	0	0
84	HUN	Emily Monaghan / Ilias Fourati	342	2016/2017 season (70%)	0	0	0	0	0
85	CAN	Emmy Bronsard / Aissa Bouaraguia	330	2018/2019 season (100%)	0	182	148	0	0
85	CAN	Emmy Bronsard / Aissa Bouaraguia	330	2017/2018 season (100%)	0	0	0	0	0
85	CAN	Emmy Bronsard / Aissa Bouaraguia	330	2016/2017 season (70%)	0	0	0	0	0
86	RUS	Eva Kuts / Dmitrii Mikhailov	307	2018/2019 season (100%)	0	203	0	0	0
86	RUS	Eva Kuts / Dmitrii Mikhailov	307	2017/2018 season (100%)	0	0	0	0	0
86	RUS	Eva Kuts / Dmitrii Mikhailov	307	2016/2017 season (70%)	0	104	0	0	0
87	SUI	Victoria Manni / Carlo Roethlisberger	306	2018/2019 season (100%)	0	0	0	164	0
87	SUI	Victoria Manni / Carlo Roethlisberger	306	2017/2018 season (100%)	0	0	0	0	0
87	SUI	Victoria Manni / Carlo Roethlisberger	306	2016/2017 season (70%)	0	0	0	142	0
88	USA	Sophia Elder / Christopher Elder	296	2018/2019 season (100%)	0	148	148	0	0
88	USA	Sophia Elder / Christopher Elder	296	2017/2018 season (100%)	0	0	0	0	0
88	USA	Sophia Elder / Christopher Elder	296	2016/2017 season (70%)	0	0	0	0	0
89	AZE	Yana Buga / Georgy Pokhilyuk	285	2018/2019 season (100%)	0	182	0	0	0
89	AZE	Yana Buga / Georgy Pokhilyuk	285	2017/2018 season (100%)	103	0	0	0	0
89	AZE	Yana Buga / Georgy Pokhilyuk	285	2016/2017 season (70%)	0	0	0	0	0
90	ITA	Sara Campanini / Francesco Riva	284	2018/2019 season (100%)	0	164	120	0	0
90	ITA	Sara Campanini / Francesco Riva	284	2017/2018 season (100%)	0	0	0	0	0
90	ITA	Sara Campanini / Francesco Riva	284	2016/2017 season (70%)	0	0	0	0	0
91	AZE	Vavara Ogloblina / Mikhail Zhirnov	269	2018/2019 season (100%)	0	0	0	0	0
91	AZE	Vavara Ogloblina / Mikhail Zhirnov	269	2017/2018 season (100%)	0	0	0	0	0
91	AZE	Vavara Ogloblina / Mikhail Zhirnov	269	2016/2017 season (70%)	0	0	0	142	127
92	USA	Julia Biechler / Damian Dodge	268	2018/2019 season (100%)	0	0	0	0	0
92	USA	Julia Biechler / Damian Dodge	268	2017/2018 season (100%)	0	0	0	0	0
92	USA	Julia Biechler / Damian Dodge	268	2016/2017 season (70%)	0	0	0	153	115
93	HUN	Villö Marton / Danyil Semko	235	2018/2019 season (100%)	0	0	0	0	0
93	HUN	Villö Marton / Danyil Semko	235	2017/2018 season (100%)	127	108	0	0	0
93	HUN	Villö Marton / Danyil Semko	235	2016/2017 season (70%)	0	0	0	0	0
94	USA	Oona Brown / Gage Brown	228	2018/2019 season (100%)	0	120	108	0	0
94	USA	Oona Brown / Gage Brown	228	2017/2018 season (100%)	0	0	0	0	0
94	USA	Oona Brown / Gage Brown	228	2016/2017 season (70%)	0	0	0	0	0
95	CZE	Natálie Taschlerová / Filip Taschler	210	2018/2019 season (100%)	127	0	0	0	0
95	CZE	Natálie Taschlerová / Filip Taschler	210	2017/2018 season (100%)	83	0	0	0	0
95	CZE	Natálie Taschlerová / Filip Taschler	210	2016/2017 season (70%)	0	0	0	0	0
96	RUS	Alla Loboda / Anton Shibnev	203	2018/2019 season (100%)	0	0	0	203	0
96	RUS	Alla Loboda / Anton Shibnev	203	2017/2018 season (100%)	0	0	0	0	0
96	RUS	Alla Loboda / Anton Shibnev	203	2016/2017 season (70%)	0	0	0	0	0
96	RUS	Ksenia Konkina / Pavel Drozd	203	2018/2019 season (100%)	0	0	0	203	0
96	RUS	Ksenia Konkina / Pavel Drozd	203	2017/2018 season (100%)	0	0	0	0	0
96	RUS	Ksenia Konkina / Pavel Drozd	203	2016/2017 season (70%)	0	0	0	0	0
96	RUS	Diana Davis / Gleb Smolkin	203	2018/2019 season (100%)	0	203	0	0	0
96	RUS	Diana Davis / Gleb Smolkin	203	2017/2018 season (100%)	0	0	0	0	0
96	RUS	Diana Davis / Gleb Smolkin	203	2016/2017 season (70%)	0	0	0	0	0
99	FRA	Evgeniia Lopareva / Geoffrey Brissaud	194	2018/2019 season (100%)	194	0	0	0	0
99	FRA	Evgeniia Lopareva / Geoffrey Brissaud	194	2017/2018 season (100%)	0	0	0	0	0
99	FRA	Evgeniia Lopareva / Geoffrey Brissaud	194	2016/2017 season (70%)	0	0	0	0	0
100	JPN	Emi Hirai / Marien de la Asuncion	185	2018/2019 season (100%)	0	0	0	0	0
100	JPN	Emi Hirai / Marien de la Asuncion	185	2017/2018 season (100%)	0	0	0	0	0
100	JPN	Emi Hirai / Marien de la Asuncion	185	2016/2017 season (70%)	185	0	0	0	0
101	CHN	Guo Yuzhu / Zhao Pengkun	184	2018/2019 season (100%)	0	0	0	0	0
101	CHN	Guo Yuzhu / Zhao Pengkun	184	2017/2018 season (100%)	0	108	0	0	0
101	CHN	Guo Yuzhu / Zhao Pengkun	184	2016/2017 season (70%)	0	76	0	0	0
102	FRA	Julia Wagret / Pierre Souquet	182	2018/2019 season (100%)	0	0	0	182	0
102	FRA	Julia Wagret / Pierre Souquet	182	2017/2018 season (100%)	0	0	0	0	0
102	FRA	Julia Wagret / Pierre Souquet	182	2016/2017 season (70%)	0	0	0	0	0
103	PRK	Phyo Yong-myong / Choe Min	178	2018/2019 season (100%)	0	0	0	178	0
103	PRK	Phyo Yong-myong / Choe Min	178	2017/2018 season (100%)	0	0	0	0	0
103	PRK	Phyo Yong-myong / Choe Min	178	2016/2017 season (70%)	0	0	0	0	0
104	KOR	Lee Ho-jung / Richard Kang-in Kam	166	2018/2019 season (100%)	0	0	0	0	0
104	KOR	Lee Ho-jung / Richard Kang-in Kam	166	2017/2018 season (100%)	0	0	0	0	0
104	KOR	Lee Ho-jung / Richard Kang-in Kam	166	2016/2017 season (70%)	166	0	0	0	0
105	RUS	Ekaterina Andreeva / Ivan Desyatov	164	2018/2019 season (100%)	0	164	0	0	0
105	RUS	Ekaterina Andreeva / Ivan Desyatov	164	2017/2018 season (100%)	0	0	0	0	0
105	RUS	Ekaterina Andreeva / Ivan Desyatov	164	2016/2017 season (70%)	0	0	0	0	0
105	RUS	Anastasia Shakun / Daniil Ragimov	164	2018/2019 season (100%)	0	0	0	164	0
105	RUS	Anastasia Shakun / Daniil Ragimov	164	2017/2018 season (100%)	0	0	0	0	0
105	RUS	Anastasia Shakun / Daniil Ragimov	164	2016/2017 season (70%)	0	0	0	0	0
107	CAN	Ashlynne Stairs / Elliott Graham	148	2018/2019 season (100%)	0	148	0	0	0
107	CAN	Ashlynne Stairs / Elliott Graham	148	2017/2018 season (100%)	0	0	0	0	0
107	CAN	Ashlynne Stairs / Elliott Graham	148	2016/2017 season (70%)	0	0	0	0	0
107	USA	Alina Efimova / Alexander Petrov	148	2018/2019 season (100%)	0	148	0	0	0
107	USA	Alina Efimova / Alexander Petrov	148	2017/2018 season (100%)	0	0	0	0	0
107	USA	Alina Efimova / Alexander Petrov	148	2016/2017 season (70%)	0	0	0	0	0
109	USA	Jocelyn Haines / James Koszuta	133	2018/2019 season (100%)	0	133	0	0	0
109	USA	Jocelyn Haines / James Koszuta	133	2017/2018 season (100%)	0	0	0	0	0
109	USA	Jocelyn Haines / James Koszuta	133	2016/2017 season (70%)	0	0	0	0	0
109	CAN	Irina Galiyanova / Grayson Lochhead	133	2018/2019 season (100%)	0	133	0	0	0
109	CAN	Irina Galiyanova / Grayson Lochhead	133	2017/2018 season (100%)	0	0	0	0	0
109	CAN	Irina Galiyanova / Grayson Lochhead	133	2016/2017 season (70%)	0	0	0	0	0
109	CAN	Olivia McIsaac / Corey Circelli	133	2018/2019 season (100%)	0	133	0	0	0
109	CAN	Olivia McIsaac / Corey Circelli	133	2017/2018 season (100%)	0	0	0	0	0
109	CAN	Olivia McIsaac / Corey Circelli	133	2016/2017 season (70%)	0	0	0	0	0
112	USA	Charlotte Maxwell / Ryan Devereaux	125	2018/2019 season (100%)	0	0	0	0	0
112	USA	Charlotte Maxwell / Ryan Devereaux	125	2017/2018 season (100%)	0	0	0	0	0
112	USA	Charlotte Maxwell / Ryan Devereaux	125	2016/2017 season (70%)	0	0	0	125	0
113	AUS	Kimberley Hew-Low / Timothy McKernan	121	2018/2019 season (100%)	0	0	0	0	0
113	AUS	Kimberley Hew-Low / Timothy McKernan	121	2017/2018 season (100%)	0	0	0	0	0
113	AUS	Kimberley Hew-Low / Timothy McKernan	121	2016/2017 season (70%)	121	0	0	0	0
114	FRA	Lou Terreau / Noe Perron	120	2018/2019 season (100%)	0	120	0	0	0
114	FRA	Lou Terreau / Noe Perron	120	2017/2018 season (100%)	0	0	0	0	0
114	FRA	Lou Terreau / Noe Perron	120	2016/2017 season (70%)	0	0	0	0	0
114	USA	Isabella Amoia / Luca Becker	120	2018/2019 season (100%)	0	0	0	0	0
114	USA	Isabella Amoia / Luca Becker	120	2017/2018 season (100%)	0	120	0	0	0
114	USA	Isabella Amoia / Luca Becker	120	2016/2017 season (70%)	0	0	0	0	0
114	CAN	Miku Makita / Tyler Gunara	120	2018/2019 season (100%)	0	120	0	0	0
114	CAN	Miku Makita / Tyler Gunara	120	2017/2018 season (100%)	0	0	0	0	0
114	CAN	Miku Makita / Tyler Gunara	120	2016/2017 season (70%)	0	0	0	0	0
114	UKR	Anna Cherniavska / Volodymyr Gorovyy	120	2018/2019 season (100%)	0	120	0	0	0
114	UKR	Anna Cherniavska / Volodymyr Gorovyy	120	2017/2018 season (100%)	0	0	0	0	0
114	UKR	Anna Cherniavska / Volodymyr Gorovyy	120	2016/2017 season (70%)	0	0	0	0	0
114	CAN	Valerie Taillefer / Jason Chan	120	2018/2019 season (100%)	0	0	0	0	0
114	CAN	Valerie Taillefer / Jason Chan	120	2017/2018 season (100%)	0	120	0	0	0
114	CAN	Valerie Taillefer / Jason Chan	120	2016/2017 season (70%)	0	0	0	0	0
119	ISR	Adel Tankova / Ronald Zilberberg	115	2018/2019 season (100%)	0	0	0	0	0
119	ISR	Adel Tankova / Ronald Zilberberg	115	2017/2018 season (100%)	0	0	0	0	0
119	ISR	Adel Tankova / Ronald Zilberberg	115	2016/2017 season (70%)	0	0	0	115	0
120	CAN	Nadiia Bashynska / Peter Beaumont	108	2018/2019 season (100%)	0	108	0	0	0
120	CAN	Nadiia Bashynska / Peter Beaumont	108	2017/2018 season (100%)	0	0	0	0	0
120	CAN	Nadiia Bashynska / Peter Beaumont	108	2016/2017 season (70%)	0	0	0	0	0
120	AUS	Joanne Cho / Jake Meyer	108	2018/2019 season (100%)	0	0	0	0	0
120	AUS	Joanne Cho / Jake Meyer	108	2017/2018 season (100%)	0	108	0	0	0
120	AUS	Joanne Cho / Jake Meyer	108	2016/2017 season (70%)	0	0	0	0	0
122	USA	Katarina DelCamp / Maxwell Gart	97	2018/2019 season (100%)	0	97	0	0	0
122	USA	Katarina DelCamp / Maxwell Gart	97	2017/2018 season (100%)	0	0	0	0	0
122	USA	Katarina DelCamp / Maxwell Gart	97	2016/2017 season (70%)	0	0	0	0	0
122	ITA	Carolina Portesi Peroni / Michael Chrastecky	97	2018/2019 season (100%)	0	0	0	0	0
122	ITA	Carolina Portesi Peroni / Michael Chrastecky	97	2017/2018 season (100%)	0	97	0	0	0
122	ITA	Carolina Portesi Peroni / Michael Chrastecky	97	2016/2017 season (70%)	0	0	0	0	0
122	GER	Lara Luft / Asaf Kazimov	97	2018/2019 season (100%)	0	97	0	0	0
122	GER	Lara Luft / Asaf Kazimov	97	2017/2018 season (100%)	0	0	0	0	0
122	GER	Lara Luft / Asaf Kazimov	97	2016/2017 season (70%)	0	0	0	0	0
122	CHN	Chen Xizi / Xing Jianing	97	2018/2019 season (100%)	0	97	0	0	0
122	CHN	Chen Xizi / Xing Jianing	97	2017/2018 season (100%)	0	0	0	0	0
122	CHN	Chen Xizi / Xing Jianing	97	2016/2017 season (70%)	0	0	0	0	0
122	USA	Katarina Wolfkostin / Howard Zhao	97	2018/2019 season (100%)	0	97	0	0	0
122	USA	Katarina Wolfkostin / Howard Zhao	97	2017/2018 season (100%)	0	0	0	0	0
122	USA	Katarina Wolfkostin / Howard Zhao	97	2016/2017 season (70%)	0	0	0	0	0
127	CAN	Danielle Wu / Nik Mirzakhani	93	2018/2019 season (100%)	0	0	0	0	0
127	CAN	Danielle Wu / Nik Mirzakhani	93	2017/2018 season (100%)	0	0	0	0	0
127	CAN	Danielle Wu / Nik Mirzakhani	93	2016/2017 season (70%)	0	93	0	0	0
127	FRA	Salome Abdedou / Dylan Antunes	93	2018/2019 season (100%)	0	0	0	0	0
127	FRA	Salome Abdedou / Dylan Antunes	93	2017/2018 season (100%)	0	0	0	0	0
127	FRA	Salome Abdedou / Dylan Antunes	93	2016/2017 season (70%)	0	93	0	0	0
129	EST	Katerina Bunina / German Frolov	84	2018/2019 season (100%)	0	0	0	0	0
129	EST	Katerina Bunina / German Frolov	84	2017/2018 season (100%)	0	0	0	0	0
129	EST	Katerina Bunina / German Frolov	84	2016/2017 season (70%)	0	84	0	0	0
130	GER	Sarah Michelle Knispel / Maximilian Voigtländer	76	2018/2019 season (100%)	0	0	0	0	0
130	GER	Sarah Michelle Knispel / Maximilian Voigtländer	76	2017/2018 season (100%)	0	0	0	0	0
130	GER	Sarah Michelle Knispel / Maximilian Voigtländer	76	2016/2017 season (70%)	0	76	0	0	0
131	LTU	Mira Polishook / Deividas Kizala	75	2018/2019 season (100%)	75	0	0	0	0
131	LTU	Mira Polishook / Deividas Kizala	75	2017/2018 season (100%)	0	0	0	0	0
131	LTU	Mira Polishook / Deividas Kizala	75	2016/2017 season (70%)	0	0	0	0	0
132	ARM	Viktoriia Azroian / Aleksandr Siroshtan	68	2018/2019 season (100%)	68	0	0	0	0
132	ARM	Viktoriia Azroian / Aleksandr Siroshtan	68	2017/2018 season (100%)	0	0	0	0	0
132	ARM	Viktoriia Azroian / Aleksandr Siroshtan	68	2016/2017 season (70%)	0	0	0	0	0
133	FIN	Monica Lindfors / Juho Pirinen	53	2018/2019 season (100%)	0	0	0	0	0
133	FIN	Monica Lindfors / Juho Pirinen	53	2017/2018 season (100%)	0	0	0	0	0
133	FIN	Monica Lindfors / Juho Pirinen	53	2016/2017 season (70%)	53	0	0	0	0

== World standings for synchronized skating ==
=== Season-end standings ===
The remainder of this section is a complete list, by level, published by the ISU.

==== Senior Synchronized (54 teams) ====
Source:

==== Junior Synchronized (61 teams) ====
Source:

== See also ==
- ISU World Standings
- ISU Season's World Ranking
- 2018–19 figure skating season
