= Annika Hocke =

German pair skater (born 2000)

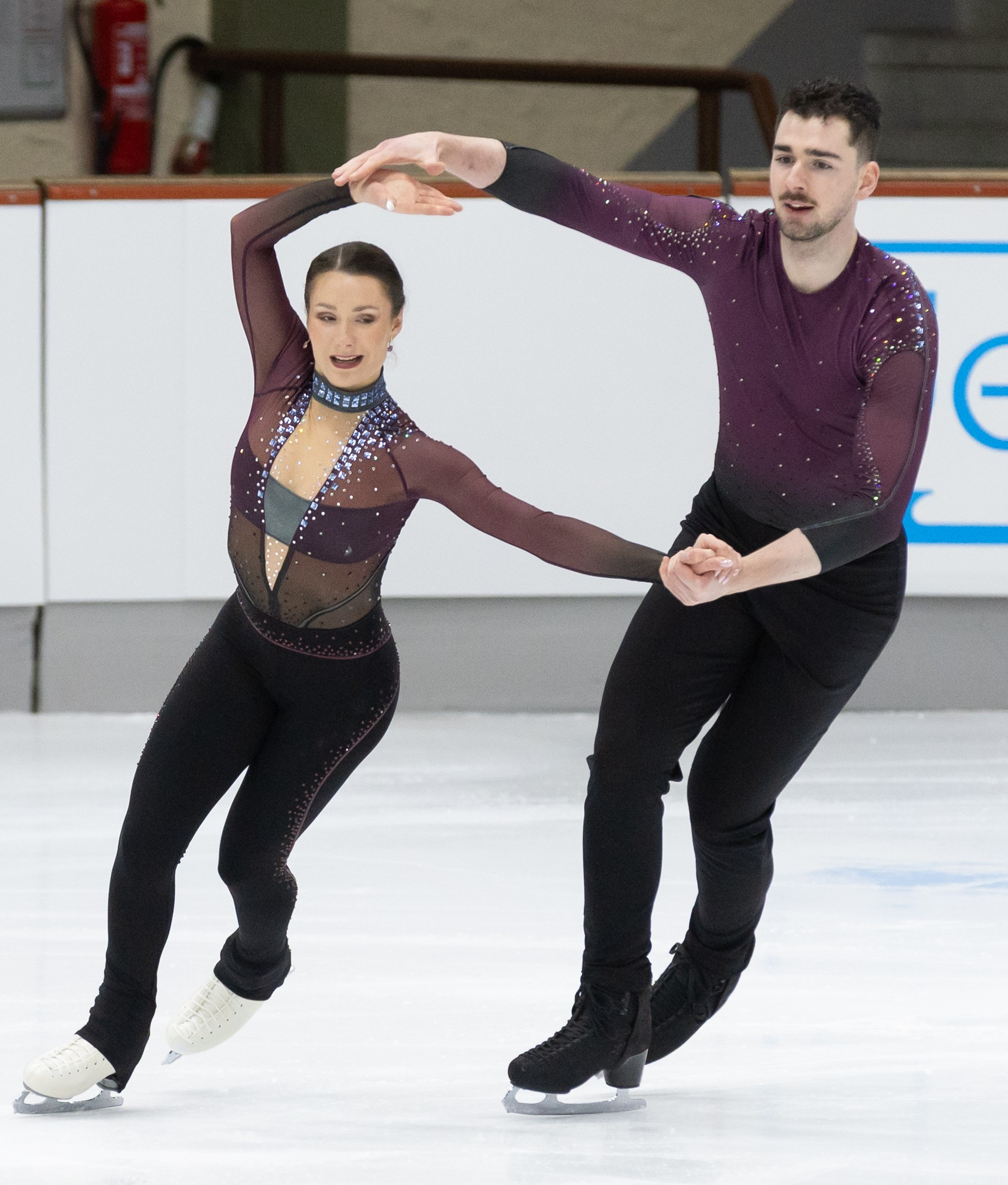
- Annika Hocke and Robert Kunkel during their free skate at the 2026 German Championships

Personal information
- Full name: Annika Maria Hocke
- Born: 16 July 2000 (age 26) Berlin, Germany
- Height: 1.57 m (5 ft 2 in)

Figure skating career
- Country: Germany
- Discipline: Pair skating (since 2014); Women's singles (2014–17)
- Partner: Robert Kunkel (since 2019); Ruben Blommaert (2017–19); Juri Gnilozoubov (2014–15)
- Coach: Nolan Seegert
- Skating club: SC Charlottenburg Berlin
- Began skating: 2005

Medal record
European Championships
Bronze medal – third place	2023 Espoo	Pairs
German Championships
Gold medal – first place	2023 Oberstdorf	Pairs
Silver medal – second place	2019 Stuttgart	Pairs
Silver medal – second place	2020 Oberstdorf	Pairs
Bronze medal – third place	2017 Berlin	Singles
Bronze medal – third place	2018 Frankfurt	Pairs

Annika Maria Hocke (born 16 July 2000) is a German pair skater. With her skating partner, Robert Kunkel, she is the 2023 European bronze medalist, the 2023 Skate America champion, and the 2026 Finlandia Trophy champion. Domestically, they are the 2023 German national champions.

With former partner Ruben Blommaert, she is the 2017 CS Ice Star silver medalist, the 2018 Bavarian Open silver medalist, the 2018 International Cup of Nice silver medalist, and the 2018 German national silver medalist. They placed sixteenth at the 2018 Winter Olympics.

Hocke formerly competed in ladies' singles, winning bronze at the 2017 German Championships and placing eleventh at the 2016 Winter Youth Olympics.

== Personal life ==
Annika Hocke was born on 16 July 2000 in Berlin. She was raised in Zehlendorf. Her parents, Sylvia Warnke and Ansgar Hocke, are journalists.

== Career ==
=== Early career ===
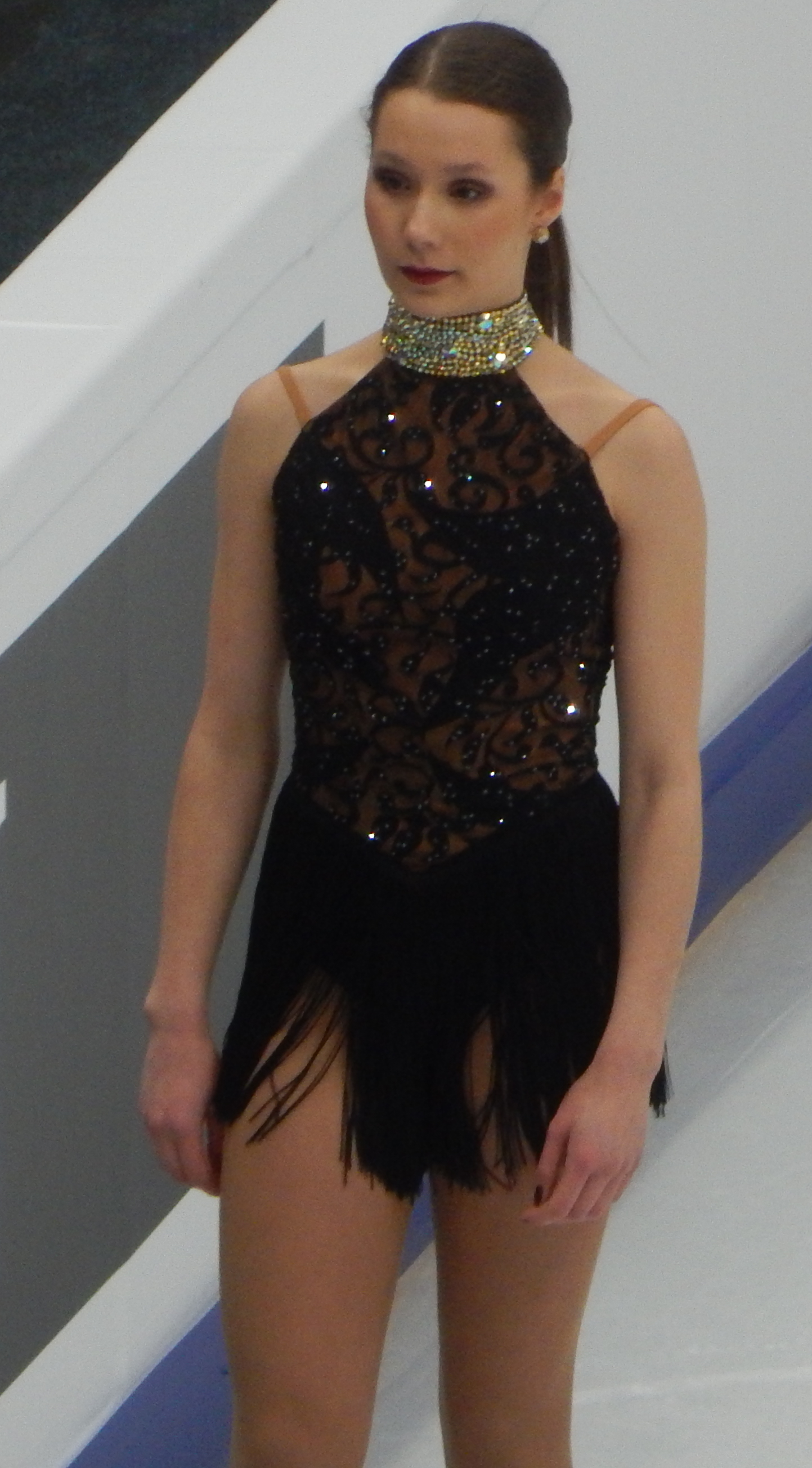
Hocke at the 2018 European Championships

Hocke began skating as a four-year-old in 2005, learning at an ice rink in Wilmersdorf. In January 2014, she won gold in the under-13 novice girls category at the German Youth Championships.

In the 2015–16 season, Hocke won junior medals at three international competitions – silver at the Volvo Open Cup in Riga, gold at the NRW Trophy in Dortmund, and gold at the Santa Claus Cup in Budapest. In January 2016, she won the junior silver medal at the German Youth Championships. In February, she represented Germany at the 2016 Winter Youth Olympics in Hamar, Norway. Competing in the individual ladies' event, Hocke placed fifteenth in the short program, tenth in the free skate, and eleventh overall. She was a member of Team Determination in the mixed NOC team event, replacing Kaori Sakamoto, who withdrew due to injury. She placed sixth in her segment and her team finished eighth. She was coached by Manuela Machon in Berlin.

In September 2014, Hocke teamed up with Juri Gnilozoubov to compete in pairs, training in Berlin. They placed fourth in junior pairs at the International Challenge Cup in February 2015.

Hocke and Ruben Blommaert announced their partnership on 9 February 2017. A year later, in February 2018, the pair competed at the Olympic Games in Pyeongchang, finishing in sixteenth place. They finished in thirteenth place at the following World Championships in March 2018. Hocke and Blommaert announced the end of their partnership following a fourteenth-place finish at the 2019 World Championships.

=== Partnership with Kunkel ===
==== 2019–20 season ====
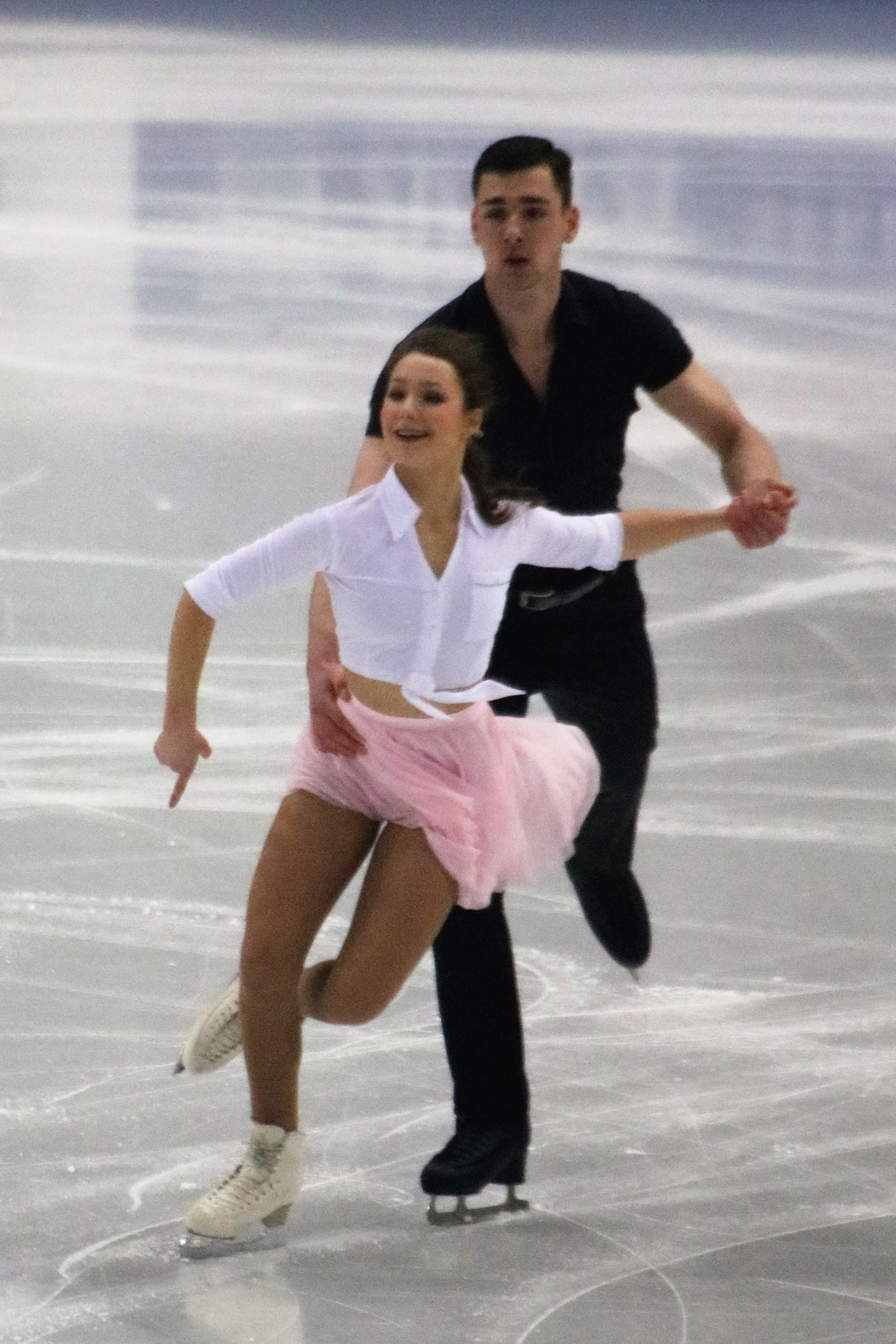
Hocke and Kunkel at the 2019–20 Junior Grand Prix Final

It summer 2019, it was announced that Hocke had teamed up with fellow German pair skater, Robert Kunkel and that they would be coached in Berlin by Rico Rex, Dmitri Savin, Alexander Koenig, and Romy Oesterreich. Despite Hocke having previously attended the Olympics, the two were still age-eligible for international junior competitions, and so began on the Junior Grand Prix, where they won two bronze medals at JGP Croatia and JGP Poland, and were the only non-Russian team to qualify to the Junior Grand Prix Final, where they placed sixth. On the senior level, Hocke/Kunkel debuted at the 2019 CS Warsaw Cup, placing sixth, and then won silver medals at the German nationals championships and the 2020 Bavarian Open. They were seventh at the 2020 European Championships.

Hocke/Kunkel concluded the season at the 2020 World Junior Championships, where they placed fourth and won a small bronze medal for a third-place finish in the free skate; only Kunkel invalidating their pair spin element by putting both feet down kept them from winning the overall bronze medal. Despite this, Hocke remarked, "our first and last Junior World Championships — it was amazing!" They had been scheduled to make their senior World Championship debut in Montreal, but the Championships were canceled as a result of the coronavirus pandemic.

==== 2020–21 season ====
With the pandemic continuing to affect events, Hocke/Kunkel made their season debut at the 2020 CS Nebelhorn Trophy, which featured only pairs training in Europe. They were second in the short program, behind countrymen Hase/Seegert, who subsequently had to withdraw because of injury. They were overtaken in the free skate by Italian team Ghilardi/Ambrosini and won the silver medal.

Hocke/Kunkel were scheduled to make their Grand Prix debut at the 2020 Internationaux de France, but the event was canceled due to the pandemic.

Initially, both Hocke/Kunkel and Hase/Seegert were assigned to represent Germany at the 2021 World Championships in Stockholm, but Hase/Seegert were forced to withdraw after Hase sustained a leg injury, leaving Hocke/Kunkel as the lone representative. They placed thirteenth in their Worlds debut.

==== 2021–22 season ====
Hocke/Kunkel began the season at the 2021 CS Nebelhorn Trophy, where they placed fourth. Hocke said afterward she was pleased with their performance in light of multiple disruptions to their summer training caused by injury and illness. They went on to place eleventh at the 2021 CS Finlandia Trophy.

Initially assigned to the 2021 Cup of China on the Grand Prix, Hocke/Kunkel were reassigned to the 2021 Gran Premio d'Italia following the former event's cancellation. They placed eighth in the short program, and then withdrew for medical reasons. In the new year, they finished thirteenth at the 2022 European Championships.

==== 2022–23 season: European Championships bronze and German national title ====
Before the season, Hocke/Kunkel relocated to Bergamo, Italy with Ondrej Hotarek, Franca Bianconi, and Rosanna Murante becoming their new coaches. They began the season with a bronze medal at the 2022 CS Nebelhorn Trophy and a gold medal at the 2022 CS Finlandia Trophy. Kunkel contracted COVID-19 shortly after the Finlandia Trophy, impeding their preparations for the Grand Prix, but they were able to compete at their first assignment, the 2022 Grand Prix de France. They won the bronze medal, their first Grand Prix medal, with Kunkel saying they were "very happy with the outcome."

On 15 November, Hocke announced via her Instagram that she and Kunkel had withdrawn from the 2022 NHK Trophy due to Hocke testing positive for COVID-19 just prior to the event.

Hocke/Kunkel returned to competition at the German championships, winning their first national gold medal and an assignment to compete at the 2023 European Championships. With Russian pairs banned from competing due to the Russo-Ukrainian War, the podium was considered far more open than in prior years. Both made jump errors in the short program, but they finished second in the segment, winning a silver small medal. Third in the free skate, they dropped to third overall, winning the bronze medal. Hocke/Kunkel finished the season at the 2023 World Championships, where they came ninth.

==== 2023–24 season: Grand Prix gold ====
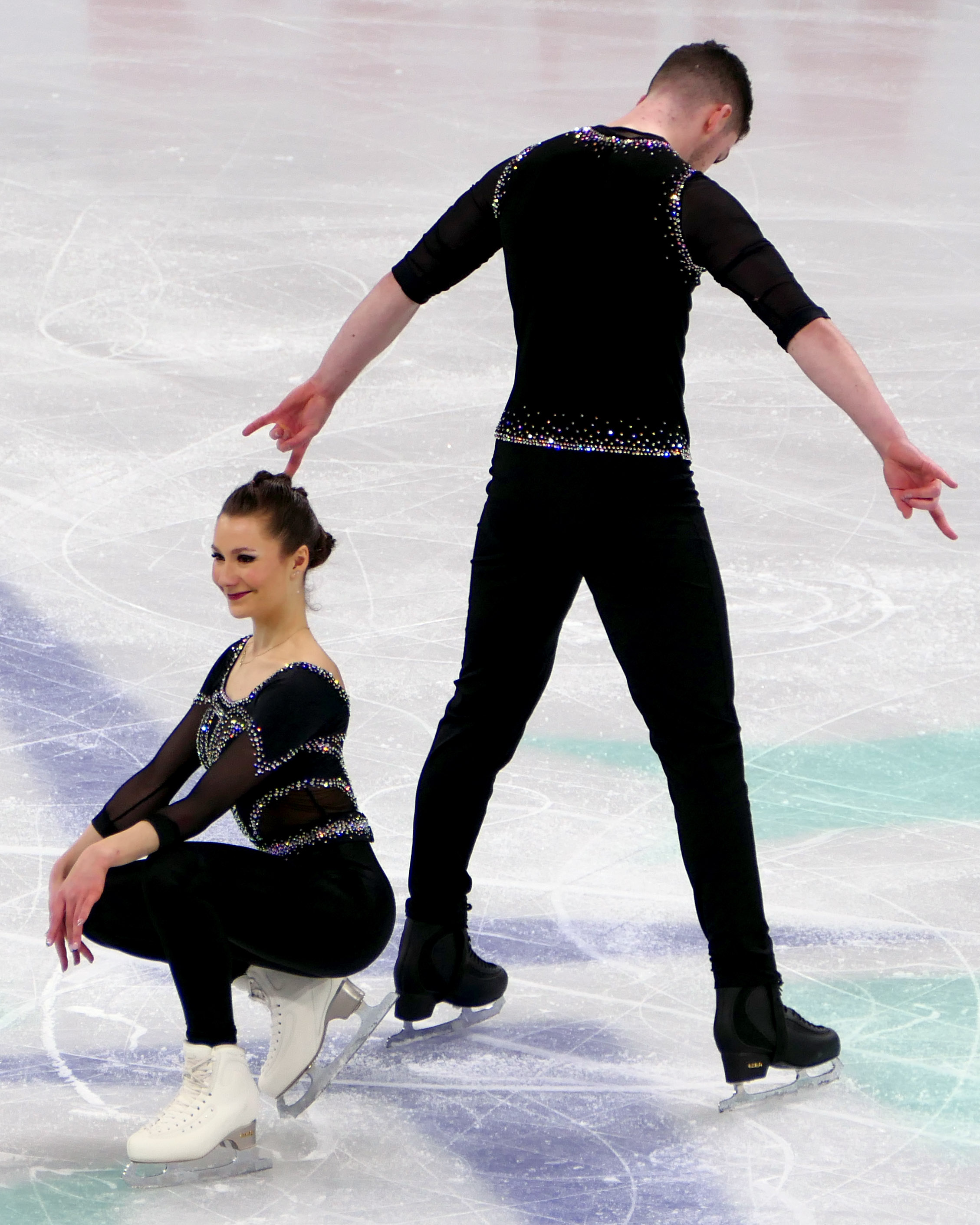
Hocke and Kunkel during their short program at the 2024 World Championships

Hocke/Kunkel began the season by winning the bronze medal at the 2023 CS Lombardia Trophy, finishing behind new domestic rivals Hase/Volodin. They went on to win a second Challenger bronze on home soil at the 2023 CS Nebelhorn Trophy, finishing 2.70 points behind Italian silver medalists Beccari/Guarise. Hocke said afterward that they were "very happy with where we are at this point in the season." They were invited to the Shanghai Trophy, taking the silver medal.

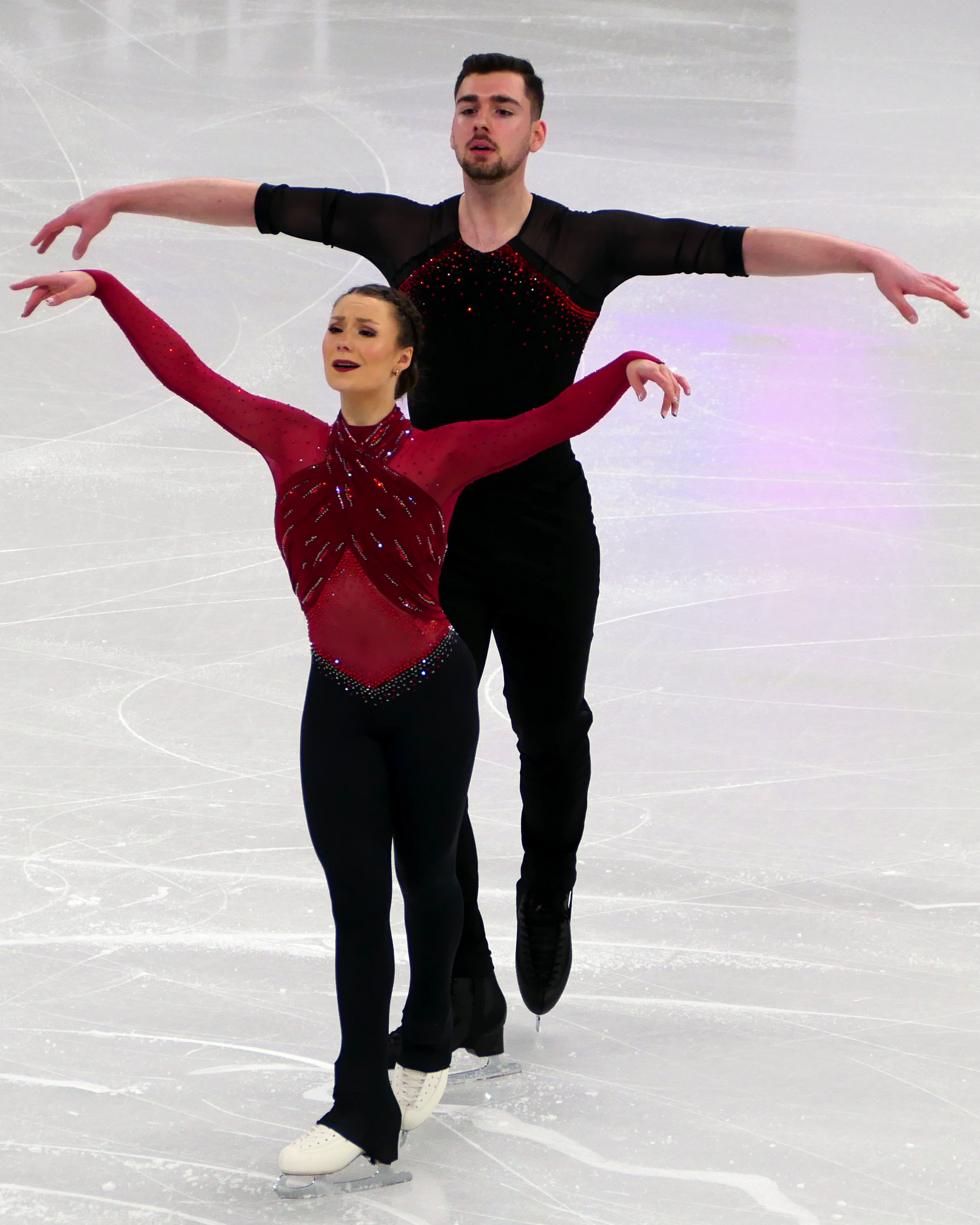
Hocke and Kunkel during their free skate at the 2024 World Championships

Beginning on the Grand Prix at the 2023 Skate America, Hocke/Kunkel narrowly won the short program despite Hocke falling on her triple Salchow attempt. They won the free skate as well, winning their first Grand Prix gold. Hocke recalled her poor experience at the 2018 edition, the site of which she called her "worst free skate ever", saying in turn that it was "so amazing to come back to Skate American like this and even win it!" In the interval between their Grand Prix assignments, Hocke was ill. They finished fourth at the 2023 Cup of China after making multiple errors in both segments. Their placements were sufficient to qualify them to the Grand Prix Final in fifth position. However, they were forced to withdraw after Kunkel developed an injury causing "immense" pain. They were replaced by first alternates Pavlova/Sviatchenko of Hungary.

Kunkel recovered sufficiently for the team to resume practice three weeks before the 2024 European Championships, where they came seventh. He said that they "didn't feel any pressure. We had nothing to lose. Of course, mistakes are annoying. Overall the result is not that bad." The team then finished the season at the 2024 World Championships in Montreal, where they were seventh in the short program with a clean skate. Fifth in the free skate, they rose to fifth overall. Kunkel said that he was pleased that they had "finally" been able to prepare without dealing with injuries, while Hocke called it one of the "competitions you dream of."

==== 2024–25 season ====
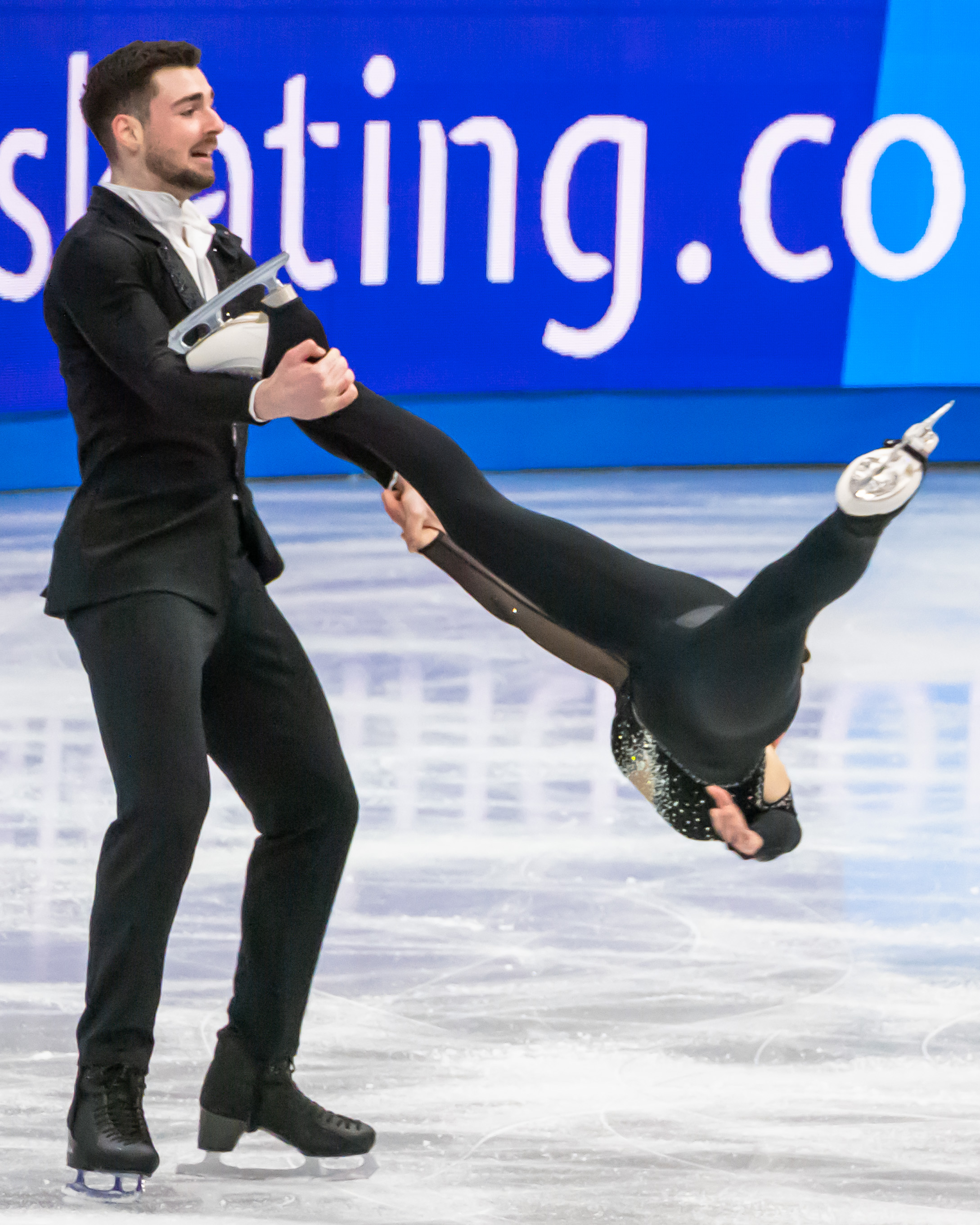
Hocke and Kunkel performing their free skate at the 2025 World Championships

Hocke/Kunkel started the season with a fifth-place finish at the 2024 CS Lombardia Trophy. They would go on to compete on the 2024–25 Grand Prix series. At their first Grand Prix event, 2024 Skate Canada International, Hocke/Kunkel would place second in the short program but fourth in the free skate, falling to fourth place overall. Kunkel described the event as "a little bit frustrating." They would subsequently finish fourth at the 2024 NHK Trophy.

In mid-December, Hocke announced that she and Kunkel would miss the 2025 German Championships due to Hocke sustaining a foot injury.

Returning to competition at the 2025 European Championships in Tallinn, Estonia, Hocke/Kunkel placed fifth in the short program and eighth in the free skate, finishing in eighth place overall. Two months later, they competed at the 2025 World Championships in Boston, Massachusetts, United States, where they finished eighteenth overall.

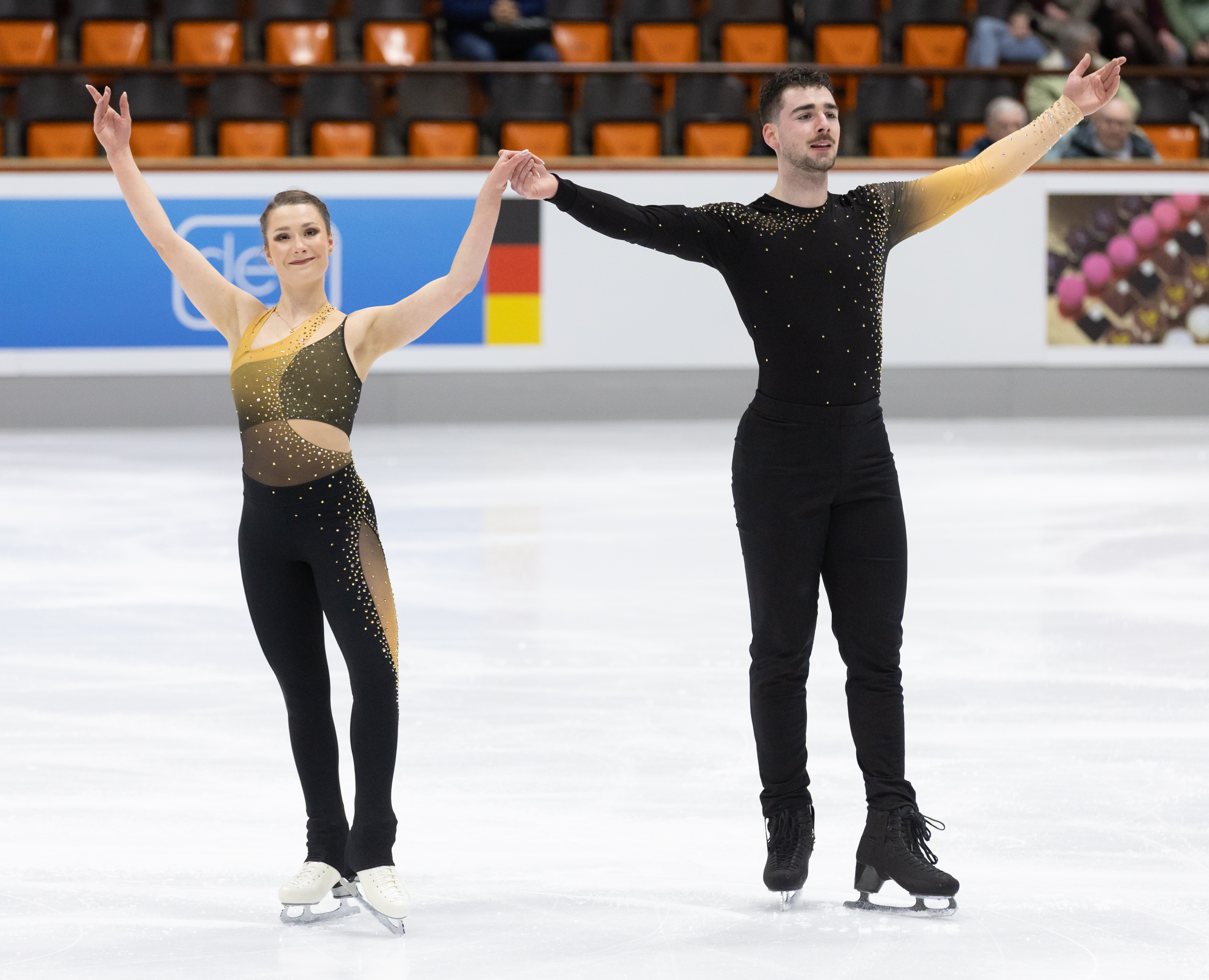
Hocke and Kunkel after their short program at the 2026 German Championships

Reflecting on the season, Hocke shared, "We really need to learn to enjoy competitions again. We love skating, we love training, we love doing run-throughs in practice, not many teams actually enjoy that. But it’s so frustrating when you can’t show it in competition. So we really have to find the joy in competing again."

==== 2025–26 season: Milano Cortina Olympics ====
In July, during a practice session, Hocke’s blade cut open Kunkel’s hand and finger. As a result, he was hospitalized and required a skin transplant.

Hocke/Kunkel began their season in late September by finishing eighth at the 2025 CS Nebelhorn Trophy. They then followed this up with a sixth-place finish at the 2025 Cup of China and a fifth-place finish at 2025 Skate America. In December, they won the silver medal at the 2026 German Championships behind Hase/Volodin.

In January, Hock and Kunkel placed fourth at the 2026 European Championships in Sheffield, England, United Kingdom. "I think we were just so happy to finally skate good at Europeans again," said Hocke. "Of course we can do better."

At the 2026 Winter Olympics, Hocke and Kunkel placed 10th. They then ended their season by placing seventh at the 2026 World Figure Skating Championships.

==== 2026–27 season ====
Hocke/Kunkel kicked off their season with a bronze-medal win at 2026 Grand Prix de France. “This medal has a completely different story and meaning,” said Hocke. “We’re incredibly happy. It’s a reward not only for us, but for our entire team. We couldn’t have done it without our doctors, rehabilitation specialists and coaches. This medal belongs to all of them.”

They then won the 2026 Finlandia Trophy and qualified for the 2026–27 Grand Prix of Figure Skating Final, the first time they qualified for a Grand Prix final in their careers. Hocke said an injury had disrupted their off-season, leaving them only three weeks to train before their first Grand Prix. While acknowledging room for improvement, she said the experience had taught them valuable lessons.

== Programs ==
=== Pairs with Kunkel ===
Season	Short program	Free skating	Exhibition
2026–2027	Black and Gold by Brenna Whitaker	Too Much Love Will Kill You; The Show Must Go On; We Will Rock You; I Want It All by Queen	Hold My Hand by Lady Gaga
2025–2026	Hold My Hand (from Top Gun: Maverick) by Lady Gaga choreo. by Anna Cappellini & Luca Lanotte	I'd Do Anything for Love (But I Won't Do That) by Meat Loaf choreo. by Anna Cappellini & Luca Lanotte	Beautiful Things by Benson Boone; Welt Hinter Glas by Max Mutzke
2024–2025	I Love Rock 'n' Roll by Joan Jett and the Blackhearts; Black Betty by Ram Jam choreo. by Anna Cappellini & Luca Lanotte	Out of the Dark; Jeanny; Rock Me Amadeus by Falco choreo. by Anna Cappellini & Luca Lanotte	
2023–2024	I Love Rock 'n' Roll by Joan Jett and the Blackhearts; Black Betty by Ram Jam choreo. by Anna Cappellini & Luca Lanotte	Without You by Ursine Vulpine, Annaca choreo. by Anna Cappellini & Luca Lanotte	Funiculì, Funiculà performed by Joel Francisco Perri; 'O sole mio performed by Complesso Tipico Napoletano; Bongo Cha Cha Cha performed by Goodboys
2022–2023	Mamma Mia!; Lay All Your Love on Me performed by Amanda Seyfried & Dominic Cooper; Voulez-Vous performed by Philip Michael, Christine Baranski, Julie Walters, & Stellan Skarsgård choreo. by Anna Cappellini, Luca Lanotte, & Joti Polizoakis	Without You by Ursine Vulpine, Annaca choreo. by Anna Cappellini & Luca Lanotte	(I've Had) The Time of My Life (from Dirty Dancing) by Bill Medley and Jennifer Warnes; The Time (Dirty Bit) by Black Eyed Peas
2021–2022	Mamma Mia!; Lay All Your Love on Me performed by Amanda Seyfried & Dominic Cooper; Voulez-Vous performed by Philip Michael, Christine Baranski, Julie Walters, & Stellan Skarsgård choreo. by Anna Cappellini, Luca Lanotte, & Joti Polizoakis	The Other Side by Ruelle choreo. by Catherine Papadakis	
2020–2021	Shout performed by Zayde Wolf choreo. by Aljona Savchenko & Joti Polizoakis	The Other Side by Ruelle choreo. by Catherine Papadakis	
2019–2020	Wasting My Young Years by London Grammar	Do You Love Me (Now That I Can Dance) by The Contours; Cry to Me by Solomon Burke; Wipe Out by The Surfaris	

=== Pairs with Blommaert ===
Season	Short program	Free skating
2018–2019	Malagueña by Ernesto Lecuona performed by Stanley Black & His Orchestra	Land of All by Woodkid
2017–2018	Big Spender Cy Coleman, Dorothy Fields	Romeo & Juliet by Abel Korzeniowski

=== Ladies' singles ===
Season	Short program	Free skating
2016–2017	Sway by Rosemary Clooney, Pérez Prado; Conga by Gloria Estefan	Carmen Suite by Rodion Shchedrin
2015–2016	Love In Three Acts; Barbara Arrives by Marc Shaiman	Carmen Suite by Rodion Shchedrin
2013–2014		My Fair Lady by Frederick Loewe

== Competition results ==
- GP – Event of the ISU Grand Prix Series
- JGP – Event of the ISU Junior Grand Prix Series
- CS – Event of the ISU Challenger Series
- TBD – Assigned
- WD – Withdrew from competition
- C – Event was cancelled

=== Pair skating with Robert Kunkel ===
Competition placements at senior level
Season	2019–20	2020–21	2021–22	2022–23	2023–24	2024–25	2025–26	2026–27
Winter Olympics							10th	
World Championships	C	13th		9th	5th	18th	7th	
European Championships	7th		13th	3rd	7th	8th	4th	
German Championships	2nd	WD		1st			2nd	
Grand Prix Final								TBD
GP Cup of China			C		4th		6th	
GP France		C		3rd				3rd
GP NHK Trophy						4th		
GP Skate America					1st		5th	
GP Skate Canada						4th		
GP Finlandia Trophy								1st
CS Lombardia Trophy					3rd	5th		
CS Nebelhorn Trophy		2nd	4th	3rd	3rd		8th	
CS Warsaw Cup	6th							
CS Finlandia Trophy			11th	1st				
Challenge Cup		2nd						
NRW Trophy		1st						
Shanghai Trophy					2nd			
Bavarian Open	2nd							

Competition placements at junior level
Season	2019–20
World Junior Championships	4th
Junior Grand Prix Final	6th
JGP Croatia	3rd
JGP Poland	3rd

=== Pair skating with Ruben Blommaert ===
Competition placements at senior level
Season	2017–18	2018–19
Winter Olympics	16th	
World Championships	13th	14th
European Championships	8th	
German Championships	3rd	2nd
GP Skate America		7th
CS Golden Spin of Zagreb		6th
CS Ice Star	2nd	
CS Nebelhorn Trophy	5th	
CS Warsaw Cup	4th	
Bavarian Open		2nd
Challenge Cup		3rd
Cup of Nice	2nd	

=== Pair skating with Jurij Gnilozoubov ===
International: Junior
Event	14–15
Challenge Cup	4th

=== Women's singles ===
International
Event	14–15	15–16	16–17
Bavarian Open			8th
Golden Bear			16th
Toruń Cup			6th
International: Junior
Youth Olympics		11th	
JGP Germany			13th
JGP Russia			7th
Bavarian Open	7th		
Challenge Cup	4th		
Cup of Nice	13th	12th	
Hellmut Seibt		2nd	
Ice Challenge	25th		
Lombardia Trophy		4th	5th
NRW Trophy	15th	1st	5th
Santa Claus Cup		1st	
Volvo Open Cup		2nd	6th
National
German Champ.	8th J	2nd J	3rd
Team events
Youth Olympics		8th T	

== Detailed results ==
Current personal best scores are highlighted in bold.

Small medals for short and free programs awarded only at ISU Championships.

ISU personal best scores in the +5/-5 GOE System
Segment	Type	Score	Event
Total	**TSS**	**198.23**	2024 World Championships
Short program	**TSS**	**69.13**	2022 CS Nebelhorn Trophy
Short program	TES	39.01	2022 CS Nebelhorn Trophy
Short program	PCS	31.15	2024 World Championships
Free skating	**TSS**	**130.59**	2024 World Championships
Free skating	TES	68.21	2024 World Championships
Free skating	PCS	62.38	2024 World Championships

=== With Kunkel ===
==== Senior results ====
Results in the 2019-20 season
Date	Event	SP		FS		Total	
Date	Event	P	Score	P	Score	P	Score
Nov 14–17, 2019	(Poland) 2019 CS Warsaw Cup	3	58.05	9	95.42	6	153.47
Jan 1-3, 2020	(Germany) 2020 German Championships	2	63.52	2	113.18	2	176.70
Jan 20–26, 2020	(Austria) 2020 European Championships	7	58.43	7	107.67	7	166.10
Feb 3–9, 2020	(Germany) 2020 Bavarian Open	3	61.58	2	115.05	2	176.63

Results in the 2020-21 season
Date	Event	SP		FS		Total	
Date	Event	P	Score	P	Score	P	Score
Sep 23–26, 2020	(Germany) 2020 CS Nebelhorn Trophy	2	60.55	2	93.71	2	154.26
Nov 26–29, 2020	(Germany) 2020 NRW Autumn Trophy	2	64.41	1	116.07	1	180.48
Feb 26–28, 2021	(Netherlands) 2021 International Challenge Cup	2	50.75	2	116.48	2	177.23
Mar 22–28, 2021	(Sweden) 2021 World Championships	13	57.48	14	105.33	13	162.81

Results in the 2021-22 season
Date	Event	SP		FS		Total	
Date	Event	P	Score	P	Score	P	Score
Sep 21–25, 2021	(Germany) 2021 CS Nebelhorn Trophy	5	59.11	5	109.10	4	168.21
Oct 7–10, 2021	(Finland) 2021 CS Finlandia Trophy	11	47.72	11	91.10	11	138.82
Nov 5–7, 2021	(Italy) 2021 Gran Premio d'Italia	8	47.72	—N/a	—N/a	WD	—N/a
Jan 10–16, 2022	(Estonia) 2022 European Championships	13	55.17	13	101.74	13	156.91

Results in the 2022-23 season
Date	Event	SP		FS		Total	
Date	Event	P	Score	P	Score	P	Score
Sep 21–24, 2022	(Germany) 2022 CS Nebelhorn Trophy	1	**69.13**	3	115.34	3	184.47
Oct 5–9, 2022	(Finland) 2022 CS Finlandia Trophy	1	63.58	1	117.04	1	180.62
Nov 3–5, 2023	2023 Grand Prix de France	5	60.11	2	119.62	3	179.73
Jan 5-7, 2023	(Germany) 2023 German Championships	1	72.73	1	121.15	1	193.88
Jan 25–29, 2023	(Finland) 2023 European Championships	2	67.08	3	117.18	3	184.26
Mar 22–26, 2023	(Japan) 2023 World Championships	15	60.89	9	123.71	9	184.60

Results in the 2023-24 season
Date	Event	SP		FS		Total	
Date	Event	P	Score	P	Score	P	Score
Sep 8–10, 2023	(Italy) 2023 CS Lombardia Trophy	4	66.06	4	125.70	3	191.76
Sep 20-23, 2023	(Germany) 2023 CS Nebelhorn Trophy	2	65.55	4	123.46	3	189.01
Oct 3–5, 2023	(China) 2023 Shanghai Trophy	2	63.37	3	116.06	2	179.43
Oct 20–22, 2023	(United States) 2023 Skate America	1	63.59	1	120.64	1	184.23
Nov 10–12, 2023	2023 Cup of China	4	60.76	4	109.89	4	170.65
Jan 10–14, 2024	(Lithuania) 2024 European Championships	6	62.52	7	115.23	7	177.75
Mar 18–24, 2024	(Canada) 2024 World Championships	7	67.64	5	**130.59**	5	**198.23**

Results in the 2024-25 season
Date	Event	SP		FS		Total	
Date	Event	P	Score	P	Score	P	Score
Sep 13–15, 2024	(Italy) 2024 CS Lombardia Trophy	5	63.54	5	112.64	5	176.18
Oct 25–27, 2024	2024 Skate Canada International	2	64.82	4	119.48	4	184.30
Nov 8–10, 2024	(Japan) 2024 NHK Trophy	4	67.37	4	121.17	4	188.54
Jan 28 – Feb 2, 2025	(Estonia) 2025 European Championships	5	62.58	8	113.87	8	176.55
Mar 25–30, 2025	(United States) 2025 World Championships	20	55.16	15	112.56	18	167.72

Results in the 2025–26 season
Date	Event	SP		FS		Total	
Date	Event	P	Score	P	Score	P	Score
Sep 25–27, 2025	(Germany) 2025 CS Nebelhorn Trophy	10	62.11	8	117.93	8	180.04
Oct 24–26, 2025	2025 Cup of China	6	65.22	6	118.52	6	183.74
Nov 14–16, 2025	(United States) 2025 Skate America	3	68.26	5	108.30	5	176.56
Dec 8–13, 2025	(Germany) 2026 German Championships	2	67.11	2	121.64	2	188.75
Jan 13–18, 2026	(United Kingdom) 2026 European Championships	4	65.47	4	122.80	4	188.27
Feb 6–19, 2026	(Italy) 2026 Winter Olympics	11	67.52	8	126.59	10	194.11
Mar 24–29, 2026	(Czech Republic) 2026 World Championships	10	65.35	7	128.76	7	194.11

Results in the 2026-27 season
Date	Event	SP		FS		Total	
Date	Event	P	Score	P	Score	P	Score
Oct 23-25, 2026	2026 Grand Prix de France	3	67.03	3	112.71	3	179.74

==== Junior results ====
**2019–20 season**
Date	Event	SP	FS	Total
March 2–8, 2020	2020 World Junior Championships	4; 63.57	3; 103.58	4; 167.15
December 5–8, 2019	2019–20 Junior Grand Prix Final	6; 59.47	6; 99.75	6; 159.22
September 25–28, 2019	2019 JGP Croatia	3; 60.74	3; 95.57	3; 156.31
September 18–21, 2019	2019 JGP Poland	3; 58.04	5; 98.16	3; 156.20

=== With Blommaert ===
**2018–19 season**
Date	Event	SP	FS	Total
18–24 March 2019	2019 World Championships	16; 53.16	13; **113.20**	14; **166.36**
21–24 February 2019	2019 International Challenge Cup	3; 58.67	3; 108.46	3; 167.13
5–10 February 2019	2019 Bavarian Open	2; 55.34	1; 108.92	2; 164.26
21–23 December 2018	2019 German Championships	2; 57.03	2; 112.34	2; 169.37
5–8 December 2018	2018 CS Golden Spin of Zagreb	6; **59.34**	6; 101.13	6; 160.47
19–21 October 2018	2018 Skate America	6; 53.36	7; 91.17	7; 144.53
**2017–18 season**
Date	Event	SP	FS	Total
19–25 March 2018	2018 World Championships	16; 63.26	13; 121.57	13; 184.83
14–15 February 2018	2018 Winter Olympics	16; 63.04	16; 108.94	16; 171.98
15–21 January 2018	2018 European Championships	9; 57.05	8; 113.16	8; 170.21
14–16 December 2017	2018 German Championships	3; 57.19	3; 107.47	3; 164.66
16–19 November 2017	2017 CS Warsaw Cup	3; 58.84	4; 103.11	4; 161.95
26–29 October 2017	2017 CS Ice Star	2; 59.58	2; 113.06	2; 172.64
11–15 October 2017	2017 International Cup of Nice	2; 55.86	2; 116.84	2; 172.70
27–30 September 2017	2017 CS Nebelhorn Trophy	8; 56.76	4; 123.61	5; 180.37
