= Robert Kunkel =

German pair skater (born 1999)

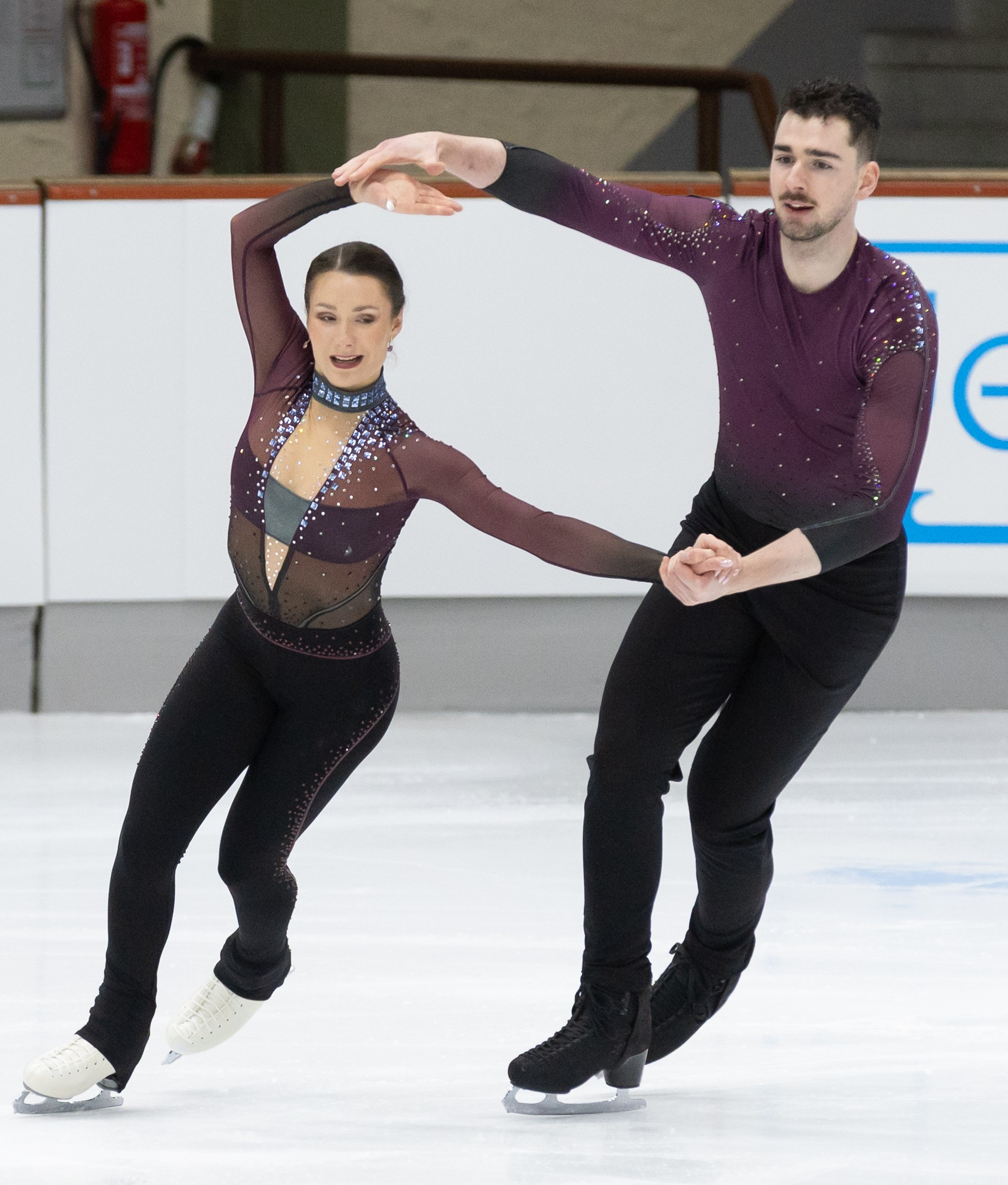
- Annika Hocke and Robert Kunkel during their free skate at the 2026 German Championships

Personal information
- Born: 28 April 1999 (age 27) Berlin, Germany
- Height: 1.85 m (6 ft 1 in)

Figure skating career
- Country: Germany
- Discipline: Pair skating (since 2016); Men's singles (2014–16)
- Partner: Annika Hocke (since 2019); Talisa Thomalla (2016–19)
- Coach: Nolan Seegert
- Skating club: SC Charlottenburg Berlin
- Began skating: 2004

Medal record
European Championships
Bronze medal – third place	2023 Espoo	Pairs
German Championships
Gold medal – first place	2024 Berlin	Pairs
Silver medal – second place	2020 Oberstdorf	Pairs

Robert Kunkel (born 28 April 1999) is a German pair skater. With his skating partner, Annika Hocke, he is the 2023 European bronze medalist, the 2023 Skate America champion, and the 2026 Finlandia Trophy champion. Domestically, they are the 2023 German national champions.

With his former skating partner, Talisa Thomalla, he is a two-time two German junior national champion (2017, 2019).

== Career ==
=== Early career ===
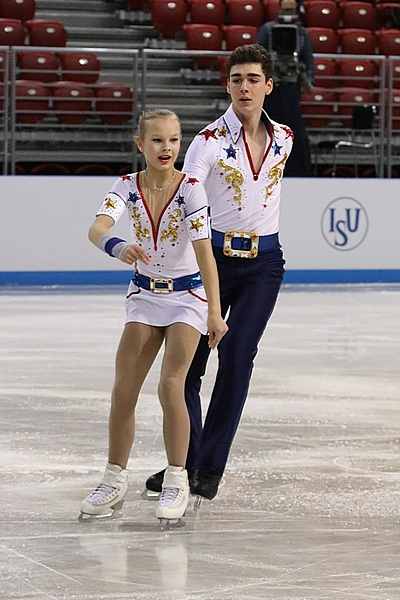
Thomalla and Kunkel at the 2018 World Junior Championships

Kunkel began figure skating in 2004. He originally competed as a singles skater before teaming up with Talisa Thomalla in 2014 to compete in the pairs discipline. The duo trained in Berlin, where they were coached by Romy Oesterreich and Rico Rex. Together, they won two German junior national titles and competed at three World Junior Championships, finishing as high as seventh. Their partnership would dissolve following the 2018–19 figure skating season.

=== Partnership with Hocke ===
==== 2019–20 season ====
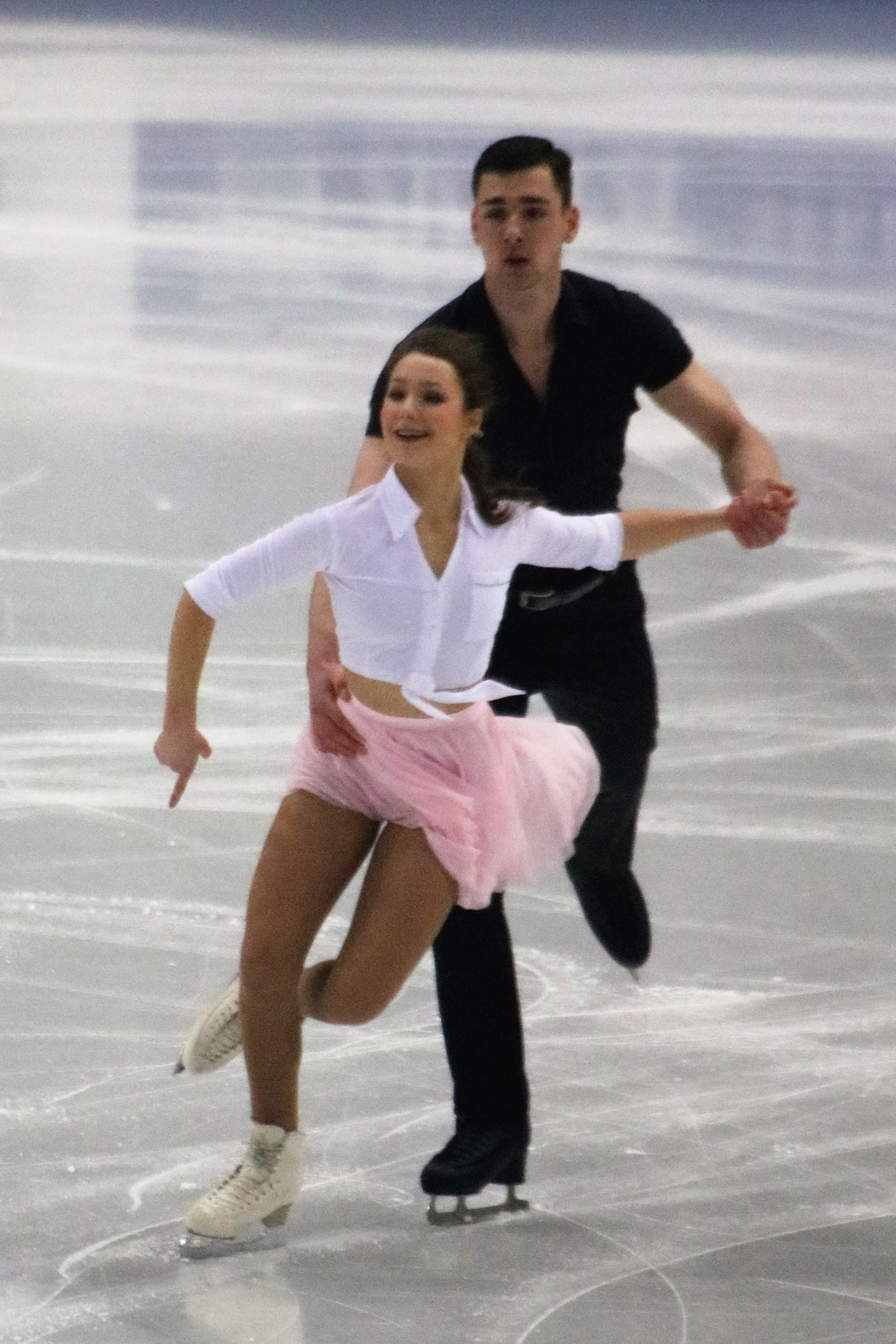
Hocke and Kunkel at the 2019–20 Junior Grand Prix Final

It summer 2019, it was announced that Kunkel had teamed up with fellow German pair skater, Annika Hocke and that they would be coached in Berlin by Rico Rex, Dmitri Savin, Alexander Koenig, and Romy Oesterreich. Despite Hocke having previously competed at the Olympics, the pair were still age-eligible for international junior competitions, and so began on the Junior Grand Prix, where they won two bronze medals at JGP Croatia and JGP Poland, and were the only non-Russian team to qualify to the Junior Grand Prix Final, where they placed sixth. On the senior level, Hocke/Kunkel debuted at the 2019 CS Warsaw Cup, placing sixth, and then won silver medals at the German nationals championships and the 2020 Bavarian Open. They were seventh at the 2020 European Championships.

Hocke/Kunkel concluded the season at the 2020 World Junior Championships, where they placed fourth and won a small bronze medal for a third-place finish in the free skate; only Kunkel invalidating their pair spin element by putting both feet down kept them from winning the overall bronze medal. Despite this, Hocke remarked, "our first and last Junior World Championships — it was amazing!" They had been scheduled to make their senior World Championship debut in Montreal, but the Championships were cancelled as a result of the coronavirus pandemic.

==== 2020–21 season ====
With the pandemic continuing to affect events, Hocke/Kunkel made their season debut at the 2020 CS Nebelhorn Trophy, which featured only pairs training in Europe. They were second in the short program, behind countrymen Hase/Seegert, who subsequently had to withdraw because of injury. They were overtaken in the free skate by Italian team Ghilardi/Ambrosini and won the silver medal.

Hocke/Kunkel were scheduled to make their Grand Prix debut at the 2020 Internationaux de France, but the event was cancelled due to the pandemic.

Initially, both Hocke/Kunkel and Hase/Seegert were assigned to represent Germany at the 2021 World Championships in Stockholm, but Hase/Seegert were forced to withdraw after Hase sustained a leg injury, leaving Hocke/Kunkel as the lone representative. They placed thirteenth in their Worlds debut.

==== 2021–22 season ====
Hocke/Kunkel began the season at the 2021 CS Nebelhorn Trophy, where they placed fourth. Hocke said afterward she was pleased with their performance in light of multiple disruptions to their summer training caused by injury and illness. They went on to place eleventh at the 2021 CS Finlandia Trophy.

Initially assigned to the 2021 Cup of China on the Grand Prix, Hocke/Kunkel were reassigned to the 2021 Gran Premio d'Italia following the former event's cancellation. They placed eighth in the short program, and then withdrew for medical reasons. In the new year, they finished thirteenth at the 2022 European Championships.

==== 2022–23 season: European Championships bronze and German national title ====
Before the season, Hocke/Kunkel relocated to Bergamo, Italy with Ondrej Hotarek, Franca Bianconi, and Rosanna Murante becoming their new coaches. They began the season with a bronze medal at the 2022 CS Nebelhorn Trophy and a gold medal at the 2022 CS Finlandia Trophy. Kunkel contracted COVID-19 shortly after the Finlandia Trophy, impeding their preparations for the Grand Prix, but they were able to compete at their first assignment, the 2022 Grand Prix de France. They won the bronze medal, their first Grand Prix medal, with Kunkel saying they were "very happy with the outcome."

On November 15, Hocke announced via her Instagram that she and Kunkel had withdrawn from the 2022 NHK Trophy due to Hocke testing positive for COVID-19 just prior to the event.

Hocke/Kunkel returned to competition at the German championships, winning their first national gold medal and an assignment to compete at the 2023 European Championships. With Russian pairs banned from competing due to the Russo-Ukrainian War, the podium was considered far more open than in prior years. Both made jump errors in the short program, but they finished second in the segment, winning a silver small medal. Third in the free skate, they dropped to third overall, winning the bronze medal. Hocke/Kunkel finished the season at the 2023 World Championships, where they came ninth.

==== 2023–24 season: Grand Prix gold ====
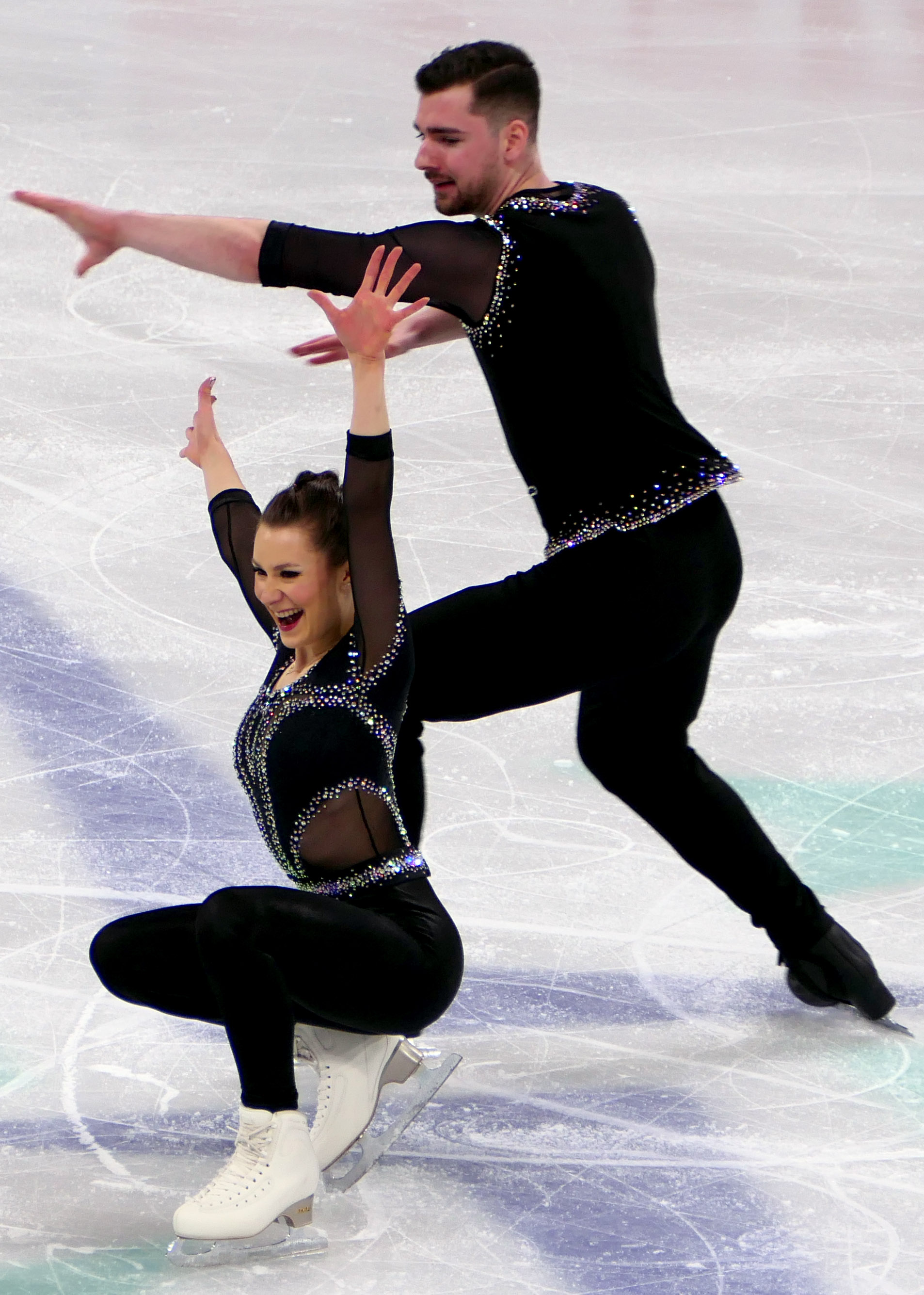
Hocke and Kunkel during their short program at the 2024 World Championships

Hocke/Kunkel began the season by winning the bronze medal at the 2023 CS Lombardia Trophy, finishing behind new domestic rivals Hase/Volodin. They went on to win a second Challenger bronze on home soil at the 2023 CS Nebelhorn Trophy, finishing 2.70 points behind Italian silver medalists Beccari/Guarise. Hocke said afterward that they were "very happy with where we are at this point in the season." They were invited to the Shanghai Trophy, taking the silver medal.

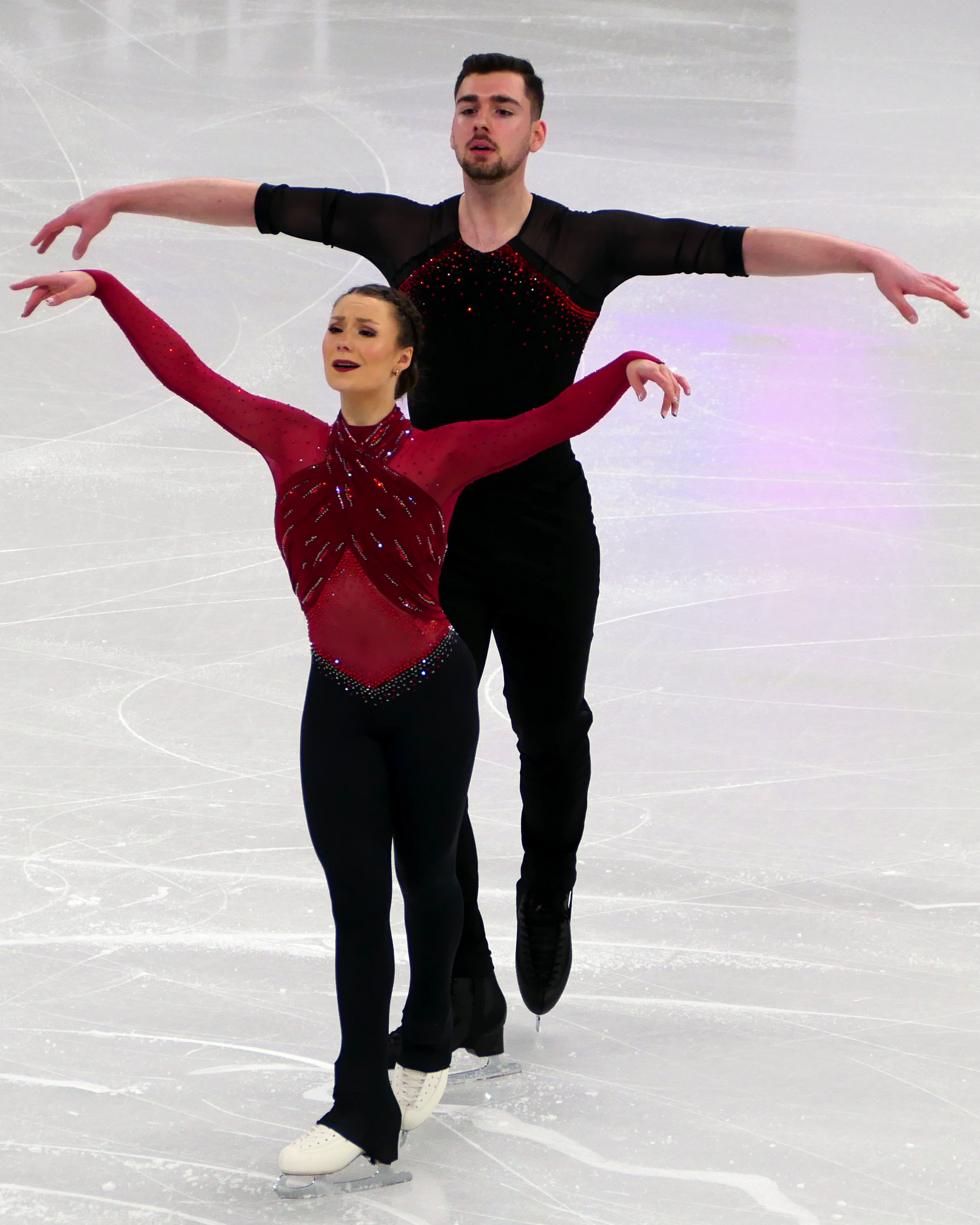
Hocke and Kunkel during their free skate at the 2024 World Championships

Beginning on the Grand Prix at the 2023 Skate America, Hocke/Kunkel narrowly won the short program despite Hocke falling on her triple Salchow attempt. They won the free skate as well, winning their first Grand Prix gold. In the interval between their Grand Prix assignments, Hocke was ill. They finished fourth at the 2023 Cup of China after making multiple errors in both segments. Their placements were sufficient to qualify them to the Grand Prix Final in fifth position. However, they were forced to withdraw after Kunkel developed an injury causing "immense" pain. They were replaced by first alternates Pavlova/Sviatchenko of Hungary.

Kunkel recovered sufficiently for the team to resume practice three weeks before the 2024 European Championships, where they came seventh. He said that they "didn't feel any pressure. We had nothing to lose. Of course, mistakes are annoying. Overall the result is not that bad." The team then finished the season at the 2024 World Championships in Montreal, where they were seventh in the short program with a clean skate. Fifth in the free skate, they rose to fifth overall. Kunkel said that he was pleased that they had "finally" been able to prepare without dealing with injuries, while Hocke called it one of the "competitions you dream of."

==== 2024–25 season ====
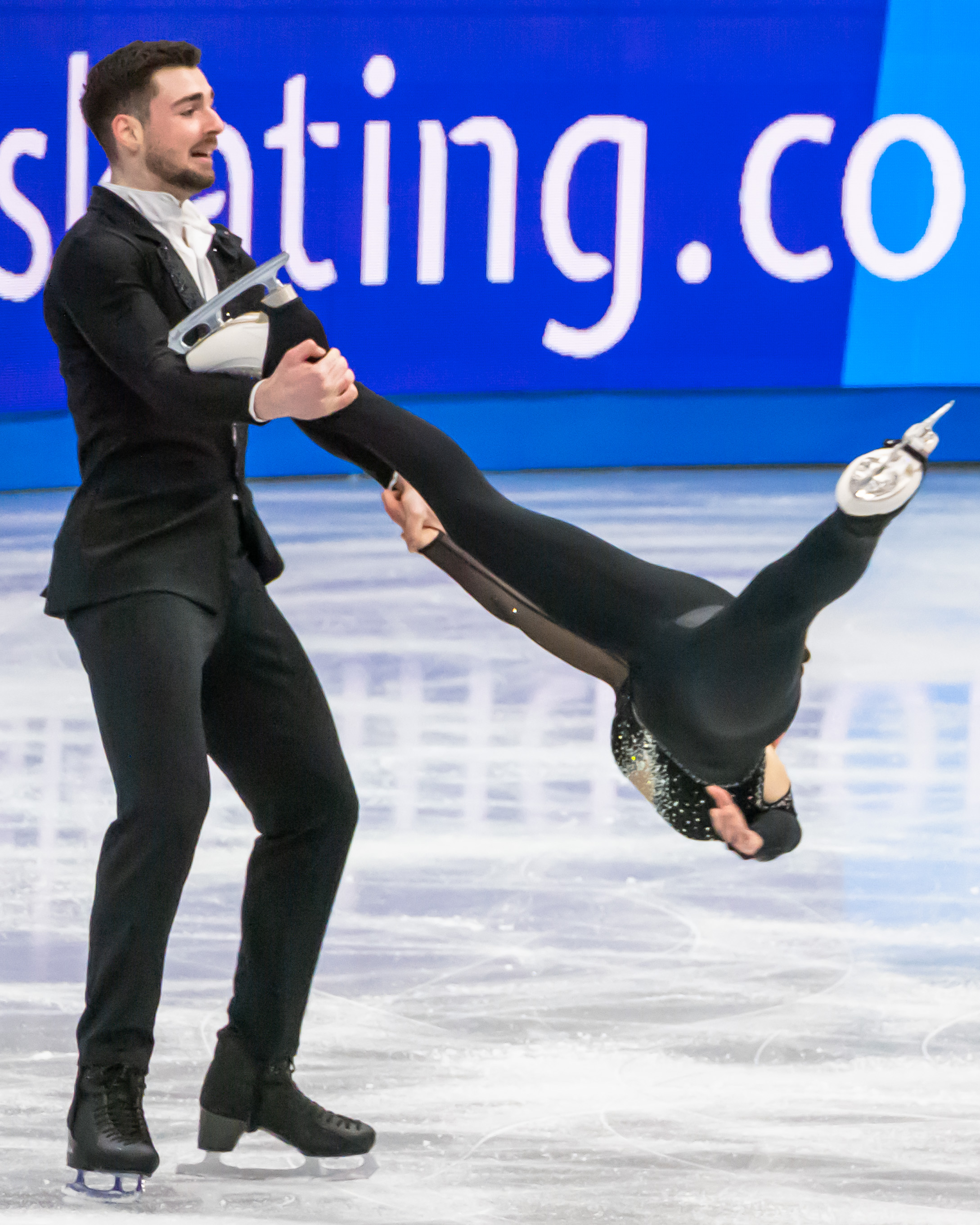
Hocke and Kunkel performing their free skate at the 2025 World Championships

Hocke/Kunkel started the season with a fifth-place finish at the 2024 CS Lombardia Trophy. They would go on to compete on the 2024–25 Grand Prix series. At their first Grand Prix event, 2024 Skate Canada International, Hocke/Kunkel would place second in the short program but fourth in the free skate, falling to fourth place overall. Kunkel described the event as "a little bit frustrating." They would subsequently finish fourth at the 2024 NHK Trophy.

In mid-December, Hocke announced that she and Kunkel would miss the 2025 German Championships due to Hocke sustaining a foot injury.

Returning to competition at the 2025 European Championships in Tallinn, Estonia, Hocke/Kunkel placed fifth in the short program and eighth in the free skate, finishing in eighth place overall. Two months later, they competed at the 2025 World Championships in Boston, Massachusetts, United States, where they finished eighteenth overall.

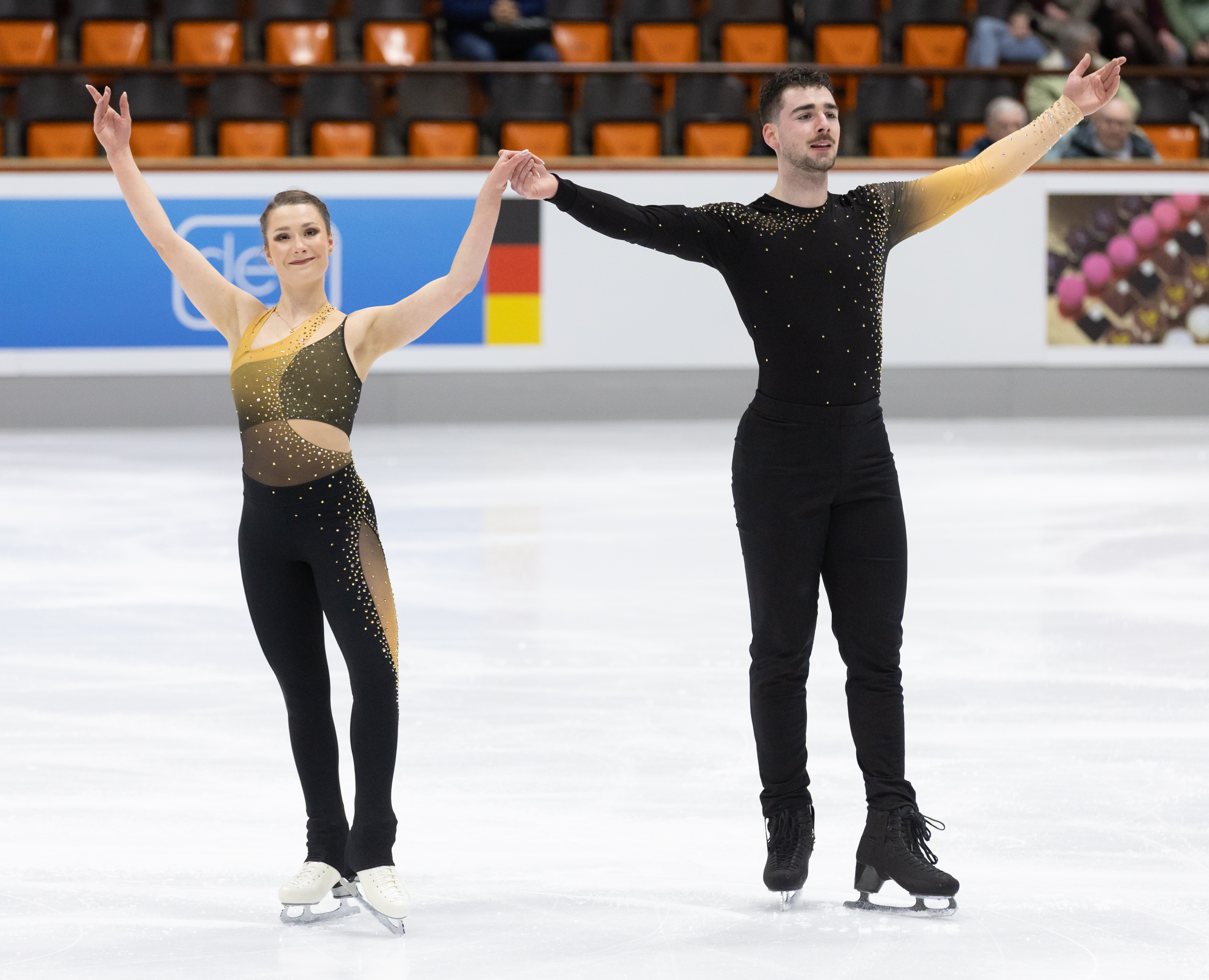
Hocke and Kunkel after their short program at the 2026 German Championships

Reflecting on the season, Hocke shared, "We really need to learn to enjoy competitions again. We love skating, we love training, we love doing run-throughs in practice, not many teams actually enjoy that. But it’s so frustrating when you can’t show it in competition. So we really have to find the joy in competing again."

==== 2025–26 season: Milano Cortina Olympics ====
In July, during a practice session, Hocke’s blade cut open Kunkel’s hand and finger. As a result, he was hospitalized and required a skin transplant.

Hocke/Kunkel began their season in late September by finishing eighth at the 2025 CS Nebelhorn Trophy. They then followed this up with a sixth-place finish at the 2025 Cup of China and a fifth-place finish at 2025 Skate America. In December, they won the silver medal at the 2026 German Championships behind Hase/Volodin.

In January, Hocke and Kunkel placed fourth at the 2026 European Championships in Sheffield, England, United Kingdom. "I think we were just so happy to finally skate good at Europeans again," said Hocke. "Of course we can do better."

They placed 10th at the 2026 Winter Olympics and then ended their season with a seventh-place finish at the 2026 World Figure Skating Championships.

==== 2026–27 season ====
Hocke/Kunkel kicked off their season with a bronze-medal win at 2026 Grand Prix de France. “This medal has a completely different story and meaning,” said Hocke. “We’re incredibly happy. It’s a reward not only for us, but for our entire team. We couldn’t have done it without our doctors, rehabilitation specialists and coaches. This medal belongs to all of them.”

They then won the 2026 Finlandia Trophy and qualified for the 2026–27 Grand Prix of Figure Skating Final, the first time they qualified for a Grand Prix final in their careers. Hocke said an injury had disrupted their off-season, leaving them only three weeks to train before their first Grand Prix. While acknowledging room for improvement, she said the experience had taught them valuable lessons.

== Programs ==
=== With Hocke ===
Season	Short program	Free skating	Exhibition
2026–2027	Black and Gold by Brenna Whitaker	Too Much Love Will Kill You; The Show Must Go On; We Will Rock You; I Want It All by Queen	Hold My Hand by Lady Gaga
2025–2026	Hold My Hand (from Top Gun: Maverick) by Lady Gaga choreo. by Anna Cappellini & Luca Lanotte	I'd Do Anything for Love (But I Won't Do That) by Meat Loaf choreo. by Anna Cappellini & Luca Lanotte	Beautiful Things by Benson Boone; Welt Hinter Glas by Max Mutzke
2024–2025	I Love Rock 'n' Roll by Joan Jett and the Blackhearts; Black Betty by Ram Jam choreo. by Anna Cappellini & Luca Lanotte	Out of the Dark; Jeanny; Rock Me Amadeus by Falco choreo. by Anna Cappellini & Luca Lanotte	
2023–2024	I Love Rock 'n' Roll by Joan Jett and the Blackhearts; Black Betty by Ram Jam choreo. by Anna Cappellini & Luca Lanotte	Without You by Ursine Vulpine, Annaca choreo. by Anna Cappellini & Luca Lanotte	Funiculì, Funiculà performed by Joel Francisco Perri; 'O sole mio performed by Complesso Tipico Napoletano; Bongo Cha Cha Cha performed by Goodboys
2022–2023	Mamma Mia!; Lay All Your Love on Me performed by Amanda Seyfried & Dominic Cooper; Voulez-Vous performed by Philip Michael, Christine Baranski, Julie Walters, & Stellan Skarsgård choreo. by Anna Cappellini, Luca Lanotte, & Joti Polizoakis	Without You by Ursine Vulpine, Annaca choreo. by Anna Cappellini & Luca Lanotte	(I've Had) The Time of My Life (from Dirty Dancing) by Bill Medley and Jennifer Warnes; The Time (Dirty Bit) by Black Eyed Peas
2021–2022	Mamma Mia!; Lay All Your Love on Me performed by Amanda Seyfried & Dominic Cooper; Voulez-Vous performed by Philip Michael, Christine Baranski, Julie Walters, & Stellan Skarsgård choreo. by Anna Cappellini, Luca Lanotte, & Joti Polizoakis	The Other Side by Ruelle choreo. by Catherine Papadakis	
2020–2021	Shout performed by Zayde Wolf choreo. by Aljona Savchenko & Joti Polizoakis	The Other Side by Ruelle choreo. by Catherine Papadakis	
2019–2020	Wasting My Young Years by London Grammar	Do You Love Me (Now That I Can Dance) by The Contours; Cry to Me by Solomon Burke; Wipe Out by The Surfaris	

=== With Thomalla ===
Season	Short program	Free skating
2018–2019	Shatter Me; Transcendence by Lindsey Stirling	Heartbreak Hotel; Don't; Hard Headed Woman by Elvis Presley choreo. by Stefano Caruso, Dmitri Savin
2017–2018	Petite Fleur by Sidney Bechet performed by Henri René and his Orchestra; Booty Swing by Parov Stelar choreo. by Paul Boll	Heartbreak Hotel; Don't; Hard Headed Woman by Elvis Presley choreo. by Stefano Caruso, Dmitri Savin
2016–2017	Petite Fleur by Sidney Bechet performed by Henri René and his Orchestra; Booty Swing by Parov Stelar choreo. by Paul Boll	Soul Bossa Nova by Quincy Jones; Andalucia by Ernesto Lecuona performed by Pink Martini choreo. by Paul Boll

== Competition results ==
- GP – Event of the ISU Grand Prix Series
- JGP – Event of the ISU Junior Grand Prix Series
- CS – Event of the ISU Challenger Series
- TBD – Assigned
- WD – Withdrew from competition
- C – Event was cancelled

=== Pair skating with Annika Hocke ===
Competition placements at senior level
Season	2019–20	2020–21	2021–22	2022–23	2023–24	2024–25	2025–26	2026–27
Winter Olympics							10th	
World Championships	C	13th		9th	5th	18th	7th	
European Championships	7th		13th	3rd	7th	8th	4th	
German Championships	2nd	WD		1st			2nd	
Grand Prix Final								TBD
GP Cup of China			C		4th		6th	
GP France		C		3rd				3rd
GP NHK Trophy						4th		
GP Skate America					1st		5th	
GP Skate Canada						4th		
GP Finlandia Trophy								1st
CS Lombardia Trophy					3rd	5th		
CS Nebelhorn Trophy		2nd	4th	3rd	3rd		8th	
CS Warsaw Cup	6th							
CS Finlandia Trophy			11th	1st				
Challenge Cup		2nd						
NRW Trophy		1st						
Shanghai Trophy					2nd			
Bavarian Open	2nd							

Competition placements at junior level
Season	2019–20
World Junior Championships	4th
Junior Grand Prix Final	6th
JGP Croatia	3rd
JGP Poland	3rd

=== Pairs with Thomalla ===
International: Junior
Event	16–17	17–18	18–19
Junior Worlds	12th	7th	12th
JGP Austria			9th
JGP Belarus		10th	
JGP Estonia	13th		
JGP Germany	16th		
JGP Poland		8th	
Bavarian Open	5th		4th
Cup of Tyrol	1st		
NRW Trophy	1st		
Volvo Open Cup	4th		
National
Germany	1st J		1st J

=== Men's singles ===
International
Event	14–15	15–16
Bavarian Open		15th J
National
German Champ.	6th J	7th J

== Detailed results ==
Current personal best scores are highlighted in bold.

Small medals for short and free programs awarded only at ISU Championships.

ISU personal best scores in the +5/-5 GOE System
Segment	Type	Score	Event
Total	**TSS**	**198.23**	2024 World Championships
Short program	**TSS**	**69.13**	2022 CS Nebelhorn Trophy
Short program	TES	39.01	2022 CS Nebelhorn Trophy
Short program	PCS	31.15	2024 World Championships
Free skating	**TSS**	**130.59**	2024 World Championships
Free skating	TES	68.21	2024 World Championships
Free skating	PCS	62.38	2024 World Championships

=== With Hocke ===
==== Senior results ====
Results in the 2019-20 season
Date	Event	SP		FS		Total	
Date	Event	P	Score	P	Score	P	Score
Nov 14–17, 2019	(Poland) 2019 CS Warsaw Cup	3	58.05	9	95.42	6	153.47
Jan 1-3, 2020	(Germany) 2020 German Championships	2	63.52	2	113.18	2	176.70
Jan 20–26, 2020	(Austria) 2020 European Championships	7	58.43	7	107.67	7	166.10
Feb 3–9, 2020	(Germany) 2020 Bavarian Open	3	61.58	2	115.05	2	176.63

Results in the 2020-21 season
Date	Event	SP		FS		Total	
Date	Event	P	Score	P	Score	P	Score
Sep 23–26, 2020	(Germany) 2020 CS Nebelhorn Trophy	2	60.55	2	93.71	2	154.26
Nov 26–29, 2020	(Germany) 2020 NRW Autumn Trophy	2	64.41	1	116.07	1	180.48
Feb 26–28, 2021	(Netherlands) 2021 International Challenge Cup	2	50.75	2	116.48	2	177.23
Mar 22–28, 2021	(Sweden) 2021 World Championships	13	57.48	14	105.33	13	162.81

Results in the 2021-22 season
Date	Event	SP		FS		Total	
Date	Event	P	Score	P	Score	P	Score
Sep 21–25, 2021	(Germany) 2021 CS Nebelhorn Trophy	5	59.11	5	109.10	4	168.21
Oct 7–10, 2021	(Finland) 2021 CS Finlandia Trophy	11	47.72	11	91.10	11	138.82
Nov 5–7, 2021	(Italy) 2021 Gran Premio d'Italia	8	47.72	—N/a	—N/a	WD	—N/a
Jan 10–16, 2022	(Estonia) 2022 European Championships	13	55.17	13	101.74	13	156.91

Results in the 2022-23 season
Date	Event	SP		FS		Total	
Date	Event	P	Score	P	Score	P	Score
Sep 21–24, 2022	(Germany) 2022 CS Nebelhorn Trophy	1	**69.13**	3	115.34	3	184.47
Oct 5–9, 2022	(Finland) 2022 CS Finlandia Trophy	1	63.58	1	117.04	1	180.62
Nov 3–5, 2023	2023 Grand Prix de France	5	60.11	2	119.62	3	179.73
Jan 5-7, 2023	(Germany) 2023 German Championships	1	72.73	1	121.15	1	193.88
Jan 25–29, 2023	(Finland) 2023 European Championships	2	67.08	3	117.18	3	184.26
Mar 22–26, 2023	(Japan) 2023 World Championships	15	60.89	9	123.71	9	184.60

Results in the 2023-24 season
Date	Event	SP		FS		Total	
Date	Event	P	Score	P	Score	P	Score
Sep 8–10, 2023	(Italy) 2023 CS Lombardia Trophy	4	66.06	4	125.70	3	191.76
Sep 20-23, 2023	(Germany) 2023 CS Nebelhorn Trophy	2	65.55	4	123.46	3	189.01
Oct 3–5, 2023	(China) 2023 Shanghai Trophy	2	63.37	3	116.06	2	179.43
Oct 20–22, 2023	(United States) 2023 Skate America	1	63.59	1	120.64	1	184.23
Nov 10–12, 2023	2023 Cup of China	4	60.76	4	109.89	4	170.65
Jan 10–14, 2024	(Lithuania) 2024 European Championships	6	62.52	7	115.23	7	177.75
Mar 18–24, 2024	(Canada) 2024 World Championships	7	67.64	5	**130.59**	5	**198.23**

Results in the 2024-25 season
Date	Event	SP		FS		Total	
Date	Event	P	Score	P	Score	P	Score
Sep 13–15, 2024	(Italy) 2024 CS Lombardia Trophy	5	63.54	5	112.64	5	176.18
Oct 25–27, 2024	2024 Skate Canada International	2	64.82	4	119.48	4	184.30
Nov 8–10, 2024	(Japan) 2024 NHK Trophy	4	67.37	4	121.17	4	188.54
Jan 28 – Feb 2, 2025	(Estonia) 2025 European Championships	5	62.58	8	113.87	8	176.55
Mar 25–30, 2025	(United States) 2025 World Championships	20	55.16	15	112.56	18	167.72

Results in the 2025–26 season
Date	Event	SP		FS		Total	
Date	Event	P	Score	P	Score	P	Score
Sep 25–27, 2025	(Germany) 2025 CS Nebelhorn Trophy	10	62.11	8	117.93	8	180.04
Oct 24–26, 2025	2025 Cup of China	6	65.22	6	118.52	6	183.74
Nov 14–16, 2025	(United States) 2025 Skate America	3	68.26	5	108.30	5	176.56
Dec 8–13, 2025	(Germany) 2026 German Championships	2	67.11	2	121.64	2	188.75
Jan 13–18, 2026	(United Kingdom) 2026 European Championships	4	65.47	4	122.80	4	188.27
Feb 6–19, 2026	(Italy) 2026 Winter Olympics	11	67.52	8	126.59	10	194.11
Mar 24–29, 2026	(Czech Republic) 2026 World Championships	10	65.35	7	128.76	7	194.11

Results in the 2026-27 season
Date	Event	SP		FS		Total	
Date	Event	P	Score	P	Score	P	Score
Oct 23-25, 2026	2026 Grand Prix de France	3	67.03	3	112.71	3	179.74

==== Junior results ====
**2019–20 season**
Date	Event	SP	FS	Total
March 2–8, 2020	2020 World Junior Championships	4; 63.57	3; 103.58	4; 167.15
December 5–8, 2019	2019–20 Junior Grand Prix Final	6; 59.47	6; 99.75	6; 159.22
September 25–28, 2019	2019 JGP Croatia	3; 60.74	3; 95.57	3; 156.31
September 18–21, 2019	2019 JGP Poland	3; 58.04	5; 98.16	3; 156.20
