= Lips, or Almighty Cod =

- The Goodies episode
- Episode no.: Series 6 Episode 1
- Original air date: 21 September 1976

Guest appearance
- Barry Cryer as the voice of the Cod

Episode chronology
← Previous "The Goodies Rule – O.K.?"	Next → "Hype Pressure"

"Lips, or Almighty Cod" is an episode of the British comedy television series The Goodies.

It was written by Graeme Garden and Bill Oddie ,with songs and music by Bill Oddie.

== Plot ==
Tim is fishing in the lake for Graeme's fish farm when a trawler arrives. Tim waves a welcome to the crew, and is not aware that the crew are unfriendly. When Tim returns to the fish farm, he informs Graeme and Bill about the crew and they found that the ship's crew are Eskimos, who have arrived in Britain to extend their limits of cod fishing.

To get rid of the intruders, Graeme, Bill and Tim throw cod at the fishermen — they run out of cod, but the Eskimos are delighted with their bumper-sized 'catch' from the Goodies' hands leaving the trio to their foolish mistakes.

To restock their cod supplies at the fish farm, Tim, Bill and Graeme travel to Iceland, where they pretend to be visiting members of the MCC. After catching a single cod, they return home to Cricklewood, where Graeme proceeds to raise the cod as a pet. The cod ends up being an enormous one.

The Eskimos still fishing in Britain and the Goodies try to think of a way to discourage them. But, Tim and Bill's attempts to scare them away are not 100% effective and Graeme tries to find a way to annoy fish in order to scare the Eskimos off with an angry fish but to no avail. After Graeme discovers that a recording of Max Bygraves singing "Tulips from Amsterdam" makes the goldfish lash about with anger, he experiments with the giant cod. The experiment works and the giant cod then accidentally swallows the gramophone and the record, which Graeme has thrown into the water. After arming the cod with an enormous set of false teeth, Graeme lets the cod escape from the fish farm, so that the cod can scare off the Eskimo fishermen, but the cod chases after Tim and Bill instead.

In its frenzy to get rid of the voice singing inside it, the cod accidentally bumps into the wharf, leading to a truly explosive situation.

== Cultural references ==
- Cod War
- Jaws
