= Horst Fischer (musician) =

German trumpeter

- Born: June 8, 1930; Oberhermersdorf, Saxony, Germany
- Died: March 21, 1986 (aged 55); Cologne, West Germany
- Instrument: Trumpet

Horst Fischer (8 June 1930 – 21 March 1986) was a German trumpeter.

== Career ==
Fischer was born in Oberhermersdorf, a formerly independent municipality, now part of Chemnitz. In the early 1950s, he was a member of Erwin Lehn's radio dance orchestra in Stuttgart. He also appeared with Willy Berking, RIAS Orchestra in Berlin under the direction of Werner Müller and with Kurt Edelhagen in Cologne. Especially his tours with Werner Müller were very successful. From 1971 he was under contract with the Radio orchester in Zürich. According to the American magazine Down Beat he was among the world's top trumpet players in the 1950s. He died, aged 55, in Cologne.

== Album discography ==
- Horst Fischer, Werner Müller Und Sein Orchester – Yesterday Hits For Dancing
- Mitternachts Blues
- Magic Trumpet
- Horst Fischer And His Golden Trumpet – Orchester Hans Bertram – Horst Fischer And His Golden Trumpet (LP)
- Ronny King – Horst Fischer – Ferenc Aszodi – Just Zinner – Roy Etzel – Sentimental Trumpet (2xLP)
- Golden Trumpet Golden Hits
- Bea Abrecht
