= Nu Aspect =

English electronic music artist and DJ (born 1997)

- Born: Samuel Higgins; November 8, 1997 (age 28)
- Origin: Bristol, England
- Genres: EDM; House
- Occupations: DJ; record producer
- Years active: 2017–present
- Label: Selected

Samuel Higgins (born November 8, 1997), known as Nu Aspect, is an English electronic music artist and DJ.

He is best known for his house producing, and forms part of the roster of the Berlin-based independent label, Selected. Higgins has collaborated with artists such as Goodboys, Elderbrook and TCTS, and has amassed over 300 million streams on Spotify, as of September 2024.

== Early life and career ==
Born in Bristol, England, Higgins first showed interest at music production when he was twelve years old.

=== 2017–2023: Career beginnings and breakthrough ===
He made his debut in the music scene, with the release of a remix of Chris Gresswell and Hayley S' "Deep Love", under the stage name of Nu Aspect. A year later, Nu Aspect released his debut single, "Things I Said" in 2017, which was distributed by the UK record label Selected.

From 2020 to 2023, Higgins kept releasing several standalone singles under Selected, which helped him grow an audience on the House music genre, with tracks such as: "Strings Attached", "What's in My Head", "Words", and "Run". On April 15, 2022, Higgins collaborated with JEWELS and MAGNUS in the single "Afterlife". It was followed by "Sleepless" with AVAION and PaulWetz featuring yuma, which ended up becoming his most successful track to date on streaming platforms.

=== Since 2024: Tomorrowland and new music ===
In 2024, Higgins released the single "Take Me Home", in collaboration with TCTS and RAHH. In May, Higgins released two singles, the first a collaboration with British singer, Jem Cooke, titled "Distraction", which was followed by the single "Bloom Again". In July, Aspect performed a live set at the Tomorrowland festival. In September, he collaborated with singer-songwriter Poppy Baskcomb on the song "Over The Edge". At the end of the year on November 29, "Sweet Release" was released as the final single of the year. "Blindspot" was released on March 28, making it his first release of 2025, it includes Goodboys, and AVAION as collaborators. On May 16, Higgins released its follow-up single, "Watching Over You", featuring Marlo Rex.

== Artistry ==
Nu Aspect sound has been described as house and melodic techno. Higgins has recalled the music he grew up to, such as house, early garage and UK bass records. He has named electronic artists Tchami, Chris Lorenzo, and Gorgon City as influences to his music.

== Personal life ==
As of 2023, Higgins is studying at the University of Manchester.

== Discography ==
=== Singles ===
List of singles, showing year released, and originating album
Title	Year	Album	Label	Ref.
"Things I Said"	2017	Non-album single	Selected.	
"Said to You" (with TRU Concept)	2017	Non-album single	Selected.	
"U" (with Ellis)	2017	Non-album single	Monstercat	
"Love You No More" (with TRU Concept and JLV)	2017	Non-album single	Selected.	
"Jungle Vip"	2019	Non-album single	Crucast	
"Light"	2020	Non-album single	Selected.	
"What's in My Head"	2021	Non-album single	Selected.	
"Run Deep"	2021	Non-album single	Selected.	
"Something Real"	2021	Non-album single	Selected.	
"Afterlife" (with JEWELS and MAGNUS)	2022	Non-album single	Selected.	
"Sleepless" (featuring yuma.) [with AVAION and PaulWetz]	2022	Non-album single	Selected.	
"Strings Attached" (with Arkaden and Sam Welch)	2022	Non-album single	Selected.	
"Words"	2022	Non-album single	Selected.	
"Miss You" (with Jamis and Poppy Baskcomb)	2023	Non-album single	Selected.	
"If You Wanna" (with Coach Harrison)	2023	Non-album single	Selected.	
"Sinner"	2023	Non-album single	Selected.	
"Run" (featuring Orem)	2023	Non-album single	Selected.	
"Take Me Home" (with TCTS and RAHH)	2024	Non-album single	Selected.	
"Distraction" (with Jem Cooke)	2024	Non-album single	Tomorrowland and Selected.	
"Bloom Again"	2024	Non-album single	Selected.	
"Over The Edge" (with Poppy Baskcomb)	2024	Non-album single	Selected.	
"Sweet Release"	2024	Non-album single	Selected.	
"Blindspot" (with Goodboys and AVAION)	2025	Non-album single	Selected.	
"Watching Over You" (featuring Marlo Rex)	2025	Non-album single	Selected.	
"Someone to Hold" (with Tudor)	2025	Non-album single	Selected.	
"Called Your Name" (with Jake Neumar)	2025	Non-album single	Selected.	
"Mind Illusion"	2026	Non-album single	Catch & Release	
"Reason"	2026	Non-album single	Selected.	
"Dreaming"	2026	Non-album single	Selected.	
"Moments" (featuring Orem)	2026	Non-album single	Selected.	

=== Remixes ===
Title	Year	Artist(s)	Album	Ref.
Deep Love (Nu Aspect Remix)	2016	Chris Gresswell & Hayley S	Non-album single	
Difficult To Love (Nu Aspect Remix)	2017	Elderbrook	Difficult To Love (The Remixes)	
Hot2Touch (Nu Aspect Remix)	2017	Felix Jaehn, Hight & Alex Aiono	I Remixed	
Instant Gratification (Nu Aspect Remix)	2017	Miranda Glory	Non-album single	
Comfortable (Nu Aspect Remix)	2018	Steve Void & TELYKast featuring Natalie Major	Comfortable [Remixes, Vol. 1]	
Otherside (Nu Aspect Remix)	2019	Red Hot Chili Peppers	Non-album single	

== Music videos ==
Title	Year	Director	Ref.
"Sleepless"	2022	goodbyefuture	
"Strings Attached"	2022	Charlie Smith	
"Over The Edge"	2024	—N/a	
"Sweet Release"	2024	—N/a	
"Blindspot"	2025	—N/a	
