= Goodbye (Imanbek and Goodboys song) =

2020 single by Imanbek and Goodboys

Single by Imanbek and Goodboys
- Released: 18 December 2020
- Genre: Dance-pop; house
- Length: 2:24
- Label: Teta Records
- Songwriters: Conor Manning; Imanbek Zeikenov; Ethan Shore; Jimmy Conway; Joshua Grimmett; Kirill Lupinos; Steve Manovski; Timur Shafiev
- Producers: Imanbek; Goodboys; Joris Mur

Imanbek singles chronology
"Kill Me Better" (2020)	"Goodbye" (2020)	"Big" (2021)

Goodboys singles chronology
"Unfamiliar" (2020)	"Goodbye" (2020)	"Bongo Cha Cha Cha" (2021)

Music video
- "Goodbye" on YouTube

"Goodbye" is a song by Kazakh record producer Imanbek and English EDM group Goodboys. It was released on 18 December 2020, via Teta Records. It also marks the first collaboration of the tripartite.

== Composition ==
The song is written in the key of B♭ Minor, with a tempo of 125 beats per minute.

== Music video ==
An accompanying music video was directed by Charlie Robins. The video catches the "excitement and suspense of a horse chariot race", an "intrinsic part of traveller culture".

== Track listing ==
Digital download
No.	Title	Length
1.	"Goodbye"	2:24

Digital download – acoustic
No.	Title	Length
1.	"Goodbye" (acoustic)	3:37

Digital download – remix, pt.1
No.	Title	Length
1.	"Goodbye" (Goodbye VIP edit)	4:00
2.	"Goodbye" (Nancie remix)	3:28

Digital download – remix, pt.2
No.	Title	Length
1.	"Goodbye" (James Hype remix)	2:57
2.	"Goodbye" (Lee Foss remix)	3:52
3.	"Goodbye" (Rasster remix)	2:29
4.	"Goodbye" (HOLA! remix)	3:10

== Credits and personnel ==
Credits adapted from AllMusic.

- Jimmy Conway – composer
- Goodboys – primary artist, producer
- Joshua Grimmett – composer, musical producer, vocals
- Imanbek – composer, musical producer, primary artist, producer
- Kirill Lupinos – composer
- Conor Manning – composer
- Steve Manovski – composer
- Joris Mur – musical producer, producer
- Tom Norris – mastering engineer, mixing
- Timur Shafiev – composer
- Ethan Shore – musical producer

== Charts ==
=== Weekly charts ===
Weekly chart performance for "Goodbye"
Chart (2020–2021)	Peak position
Belgium (Ultratip Bubbling Under Flanders)	29
Belgium (Ultratip Bubbling Under Wallonia)	18
CIS Airplay (TopHit)	124
Hungary (Single Top 40)	21
New Zealand Hot Singles (RMNZ)	34
UK Singles (OCC)	59
US Hot Dance/Electronic Songs (Billboard)	15

=== Year-end charts ===
Year-end chart performance for "Goodbye"
Chart (2021)	Position
US Hot Dance/Electronic Songs (Billboard)	37

== Certifications ==
Certifications for "Goodbye"
Region	Certification	Certified units/sales
Brazil (Pro-Música Brasil)	2× Platinum	80,000^{‡}
^{‡} Sales+streaming figures based on certification alone.
