= Piece of Your Heart =

Single by Meduza and Goodboys

from the EP Introducing Meduza and the album Meduza
- Released: 1 February 2019
- Recorded: 2018
- Genre: Deep house
- Length: 2:32
- Label: Virgin; Polydor
- Songwriters: Luca de Gregorio; Mattia Vitale; Simone Giani; Conor Blake; Nathan Cross; Joshua Grimmett
- Producer: Meduza

Meduza singles chronology
"Piece of Your Heart" (2019)	"Lose Control" (2019)

Goodboys singles chronology
"Piece of Your Heart" (2019)	"Lose Control" (2019)

Music video
- "Piece of Your Heart" on YouTube

"Piece of Your Heart" is a song by Italian production trio Meduza featuring British vocal trio Goodboys, released as a single by Virgin Records on 1 February 2019. It peaked at number two on the UK Singles Chart and topped the US Dance Club Songs chart. As of March 2026, the song has amassed more than 1.1 billion streams on Spotify. The song also appears on Meduza's self-titled album.

== Background ==
Both Meduza and Goodboys are co-managed by the same management company and had a mutual friend, and began working at the same studio in London in 2018. While recording, Joshua Grimmett from Goodboys spoke through the talk box and said "Sorry, just quickly..." before singing the "da-da-da-da" hook. Both groups have different managers at the company, with one saying the remark should be taken out, while the other said it should be kept in. Mattia Vitale from Meduza said that he hoped that the song inspired other producers to make house records that will be played on the radio.

== Charts ==
=== Weekly charts ===
Chart (2019–2020)	Peak position
Australia (ARIA)	7
Austria (Ö3 Austria Top 40)	9
Belgium (Ultratop 50 Flanders)	2
Belgium (Ultratop 50 Wallonia)	4
Brazil (Top 100 Brasil)	84
Bulgaria Airplay (PROPHON)	1
Canada (Canadian Hot 100)	39
China Airplay/FL (Billboard)	22
CIS Airplay (TopHit)	2
Czech Republic Airplay (ČNS IFPI)	6
Czech Republic Singles Digital (ČNS IFPI)	3
Denmark (Tracklisten)	4
France (SNEP)	22
Germany (GfK)	4
Global Excl. US (Billboard)	133
Greece (IFPI)	14
Hungary (Dance Top 40)	9
Hungary (Rádiós Top 40)	2
Hungary (Single Top 40)	8
Hungary (Stream Top 40)	10
Iceland (Tónlistinn)	8
Ireland (IRMA)	3
Italy (FIMI)	10
Latvia (LAIPA)	4
Lithuania (AGATA)	5
Mexico Ingles Airplay (Billboard)	1
Netherlands (Dutch Top 40)	4
Netherlands (Single Top 100)	6
New Zealand (Recorded Music NZ)	27
Norway (VG-lista)	22
Poland Airplay (ZPAV)	9
Portugal (AFP)	7
Romania (Airplay 100)	12
Russia Airplay (TopHit)	1
San Marino (SMRRTV Top 50)	7
Scotland Singles (Official Charts)	2
Slovakia Airplay (ČNS IFPI)	7
Slovakia Singles Digital (ČNS IFPI)	3
Slovenia (SloTop50)	6
Sweden (Sverigetopplistan)	20
Switzerland (Schweizer Hitparade)	6
UK Singles (Official Charts)	2
UK Dance (Official Charts)	1
Ukraine Airplay (TopHit)	17
US Dance Club Songs (Billboard)	1
US Hot Dance/Electronic Songs (Billboard)	10

2025 weekly chart performance for "Piece of Your Heart"
Chart (2025)	Peak position
Venezuela Airplay (Record Report)	116

=== Monthly charts ===
Chart (2019)	Peak position
Brazil (Pro-Música Brasil)	22

=== Year-end charts ===
Chart (2019)	Position
Australia (ARIA)	16
Austria (Ö3 Austria Top 40)	21
Belgium (Ultratop Flanders)	7
Belgium (Ultratop Wallonia)	16
Canada (Canadian Hot 100)	97
CIS (Tophit)	6
Denmark (Tracklisten)	15
France (SNEP)	72
Germany (Official German Charts)	13
Hungary (Dance Top 40)	39
Hungary (Single Top 40)	61
Iceland (Tónlistinn)	30
Ireland (IRMA)	11
Italy (FIMI)	25
Latvia (LAIPA)	15
Netherlands (Dutch Top 40)	12
Netherlands (Single Top 100)	16
Poland (ZPAV)	51
Portugal (AFP)	30
Russia Airplay (Tophit)	6
Slovenia (SloTop50)	24
Sweden (Sverigetopplistan)	70
Switzerland (Schweizer Hitparade)	20
Ukraine Airplay (Tophit)	86
UK Singles (Official Charts Company)	11
US Dance Club Songs (Billboard)	16
US Hot Dance/Electronic Songs (Billboard)	20

Chart (2020)	Position
Australia (ARIA)	95
Hungary (Dance Top 40)	25
Hungary (Rádiós Top 40)	15
Romania (Airplay 100)	56
Switzerland (Schweizer Hitparade)	89

Chart (2021)	Position
Brazil Streaming (Pro-Música Brasil)	138
Portugal (AFP)	136

== Certifications ==
Region	Certification	Certified units/sales
Australia (ARIA)	5× Platinum	350,000^{‡}
Belgium (BRMA)	2× Platinum	80,000^{‡}
Brazil (Pro-Música Brasil)	9× Diamond	1,440,000^{‡}
Canada (Music Canada)	4× Platinum	320,000^{‡}
Denmark (IFPI Danmark)	2× Platinum	180,000^{‡}
France (SNEP)	Diamond	333,333^{‡}
Germany (BVMI)	3× Gold	600,000^{‡}
Italy (FIMI)	3× Platinum	210,000^{‡}
Mexico (AMPROFON)	Diamond+Gold	330,000^{‡}
New Zealand (RMNZ)	3× Platinum	90,000^{‡}
Poland (ZPAV)	4× Platinum	200,000^{‡}
Portugal (AFP)	4× Platinum	40,000^{‡}
Spain (Promusicae)	2× Platinum	120,000^{‡}
United Kingdom (BPI)	3× Platinum	1,800,000^{‡}
United States (RIAA)	Platinum	1,000,000^{‡}
Streaming
Sweden (GLF)	2× Platinum	16,000,000^{†}
^{‡} Sales+streaming figures based on certification alone.^{†} Streaming-only figures based on certification alone.

== See also ==
- List of Billboard number-one dance songs of 2019
