= Ernst Bader =

German actor, composer and songwriter (1914–1999)

- Born: 7 June 1914; Stettin, Pomerania, Prussia, German Empire
- Died: 10 August 1999 (aged 85); Norderstedt, Schleswig-Holstein, Germany
- Occupations: Actor; composer; songwriter
- Notable work: "Tulips from Amsterdam"; "Milord"; "Bongo Cha Cha Cha"; Shoulder Arms; Legion Condor

Ernst Bader (7 June 1914 – 10 August 1999) was a German actor, composer and songwriter (lyricist) best known for his hit recordings "Tulips from Amsterdam" and "Milord". In 2021, "Bongo Cha Cha Cha", a song he co-wrote for Caterina Valente, gained renewed success. Performers of songs written or produced by Ernst Bader include Marlene Dietrich, Edith Piaf, Dalida, Nana Mouskouri, Charles Aznavour and Freddy Quinn.

== Selected filmography ==
- Shoulder Arms (1939)
- Legion Condor (1939)
- Thrice Wed (1941)

== Bibliography ==
- Die Welt ist schön, Milord (in German). Fischerhude: Verlag Atelier im Bauernhaus. 1984.
