= Meduza (producers) =

Italian electronic music group

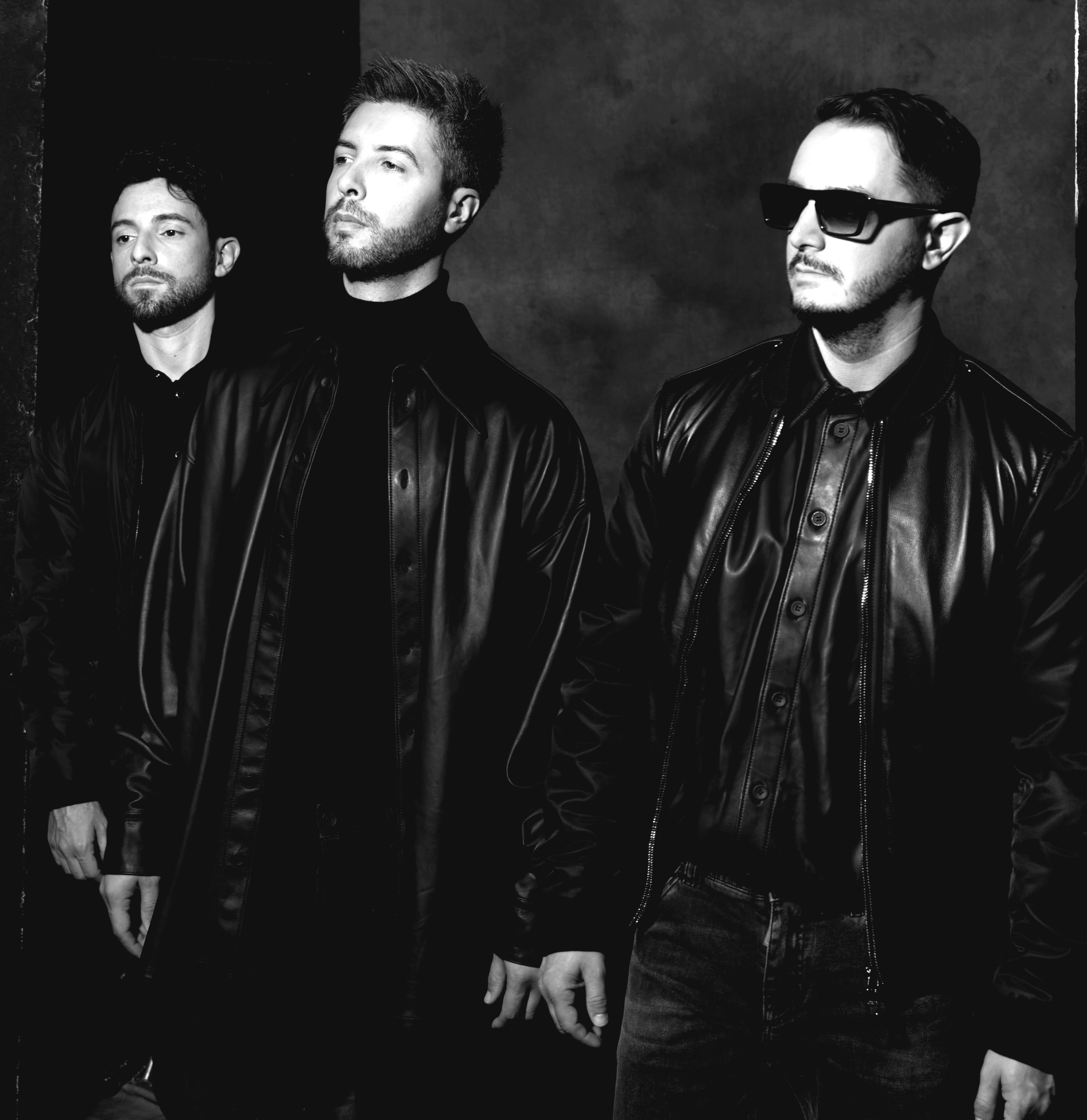
- Meduza in 2024

Background information
- Origin: Milan, Italy
- Genre: House
- Years active: 2018–present
- Labels: Virgin; Polydor; Defected
- Members: Luca de Gregorio (Luke Degree); Mattia Vitale (Madwill); Simone Giani (Simon de Jano)

Meduza (stylized in all capitals) is an Italian house music production group consisting of three members: Luca de Gregorio, Mattia Vitale and Simone Giani. They are best known for their 2019 breakthrough songs "Piece of Your Heart", which was a collaboration with British production trio Goodboys and "Lose Control" which was also a collaboration with Goodboys and British singer Becky Hill. "Piece of Your Heart" reached number two on the UK Singles Chart upon release, and was nominated for the Grammy Award for Best Dance Recording.

On November 11, 2020, Meduza performed a live set in Cava dei Balestrieri in San Marino. The performance was streamed on Twitch, in conjunction with Live Nation and the Fuser video game.

Meduza was nominated for and won the award for Best Dance Song in 2020 at the International Dance Music Awards. Meduza's song "Paradise" has over 841 million streams on Spotify. Their song "Lose Control" passed 1 billion streams, currently at 1.067 billion streams, and their #1 hit song "Piece of Your Heart" has over 1 billion streams on Spotify. They have over 5 billion streams across all their records combined on Spotify.

== Discography ==
=== Extended plays ===
List of EPs, with selected details
Title	Details
Introducing Meduza	Released: 25 February 2021; Label: UMG Recordings
Meduza	Released: 13 October 2023; Label: UMG Recordings

=== Singles ===
List of singles as lead artist, with selected chart positions, certifications and album name
Title	Year	Peak chart positions										Certifications	Album
Title	Year	ITA	AUS	AUT	BEL (FL)	CAN	DEN	GER	POL	SWE	UK	Certifications	Album
"Piece of Your Heart" (with Goodboys)	2019	10	7	9	2	39	4	4	9	20	2	FIMI: 3× Platinum; ARIA: 5× Platinum; BEA: 2× Platinum; BPI: 3× Platinum; BVMI: 3× Gold; GLF: 2× Platinum; IFPI DEN: 2× Platinum; MC: 4× Platinum; RIAA: Platinum; ZPAV: 4× Platinum	Introducing Meduza
"Lose Control" (with Becky Hill and Goodboys)	2019	37	11	52	6	46	—	30	11	75	11	FIMI: Platinum; ARIA: 4× Platinum; BEA: Platinum; BPI: 2× Platinum; BVMI: Platinum; GLF: Platinum; IFPI AUT: Gold; IFPI DEN: Platinum; MC: 3× Platinum; RIAA: Platinum; ZPAV: 3× Platinum	Introducing Meduza and Get to Know
"Born to Love" (featuring Shells)	2020	—	—	—	—	—	—	—	—	—	—		Introducing Meduza
"Paradise" (featuring Dermot Kennedy)	2020	19	19	15	8	50	17	14	3	77	5	FIMI: Platinum; ARIA: Platinum; BEA: Gold; BPI: Platinum; BVMI: Platinum; GLF: Platinum; IFPI AUT: Platinum; IFPI DEN: Platinum; MC: 3× Platinum; RIAA: Platinum; ZPAV: 2× Platinum	Introducing Meduza
"Headrush" (featuring Elroii)	2021	—	—	—	—	—	—	—	—	—	—		Non-album single
"Tell It to My Heart" (featuring Hozier)	2021	70	—	—	—	—	—	70	26	97	46	FIMI: Gold; BPI: Silver; MC: Platinum; ZPAV: Gold	Meduza EP
"Bad Memories" (with James Carter featuring Elley Duhé and Fast Boy)	2022	—	8	6	7	—	—	13	1	— (Note: "Bad Memories" did not enter the Swedish Singellista Chart, but peaked at number four on the Swedish Heatseeker Chart.)	80	FIMI: Gold; BEA: Platinum; BPI: Gold; BVMI: Platinum; IFPI AUT: Gold; MC: Gold; ZPAV: 3× Platinum	Meduza EP
"Under Pressure" (with Vintage Culture featuring Ben Samama)	2022	—	—	—	—	—	—	—	—	—	—		Non-album singles
"Just a Feeling" (with Metador and Artche)	2022	—	—	—	—	—	—	—	—	—	—		Non-album singles
"Sparks" (with DEL-30 featuring Mali-Koa)	2022	—	—	—	—	—	—	—	—	—	—		Non-album singles
"Pegasus" (with Eli & Fur)	2023	—	—	—	—	—	—	—	—	—	—		Non-album singles
"Upside Down" (featuring Poppy Baskcomb)	2023	—	—	—	—	—	—	—	—	—	—		Meduza EP
"Friends"	2023	—	—	—	—	—	—	—	—	—	—		Meduza EP
"Phone" (featuring Em Beihold and Sam Tompkins)	2023	—	—	—	—	—	—	—	—	—	—		Meduza EP
"Musica"	2023	—	—	—	—	—	—	—	—	—	—		Non-album singles
"I Got Nothing" (with Ferreck Dawn and Clementine Douglas)	2023	—	—	—	—	—	—	—	—	—	—		Non-album singles
"Dola re Dola" (with Varun Jain)	2024	—	—	—	—	—	—	—	—	—	—		Non-album singles
"Fire (Official UEFA Euro 2024 Song)" (with OneRepublic and Leony)	2024	—	—	49	45	—	—	29	—	—	—		Artificial Paradise (deluxe)
"Another World" (featuring Hayla)	2024	—	—	—	—	—	—	—	—	—	—		Non-album singles
"Rollin'" (with Pnau)	2026	—	—	—	—	—	—	—	—	—	—		Ahhcade
"Don’t Wanna Go Home" (featuring Henry Camamile)	2026	—	—	—	—	—	—	—	—	—	—		Non-album singles
"Weekend" (with Khalid)	2026	—	—	—	—	—	—	—	—	—	—		Non-album singles
"7 Days" (with Kevin de Fries)	2026	—	—	—	—	—	—	—	—	—	—		Non-album singles
"Pice of Your Love" (with Chromeo)	2026	—	—	—	—	—	—	—	—	—	—		Non-album singles
"—" denotes a recording that did not chart or was not released.

=== Remixes ===
- Friendly Fires – "Heaven Let Me In" (2018)
- Ferreck Dawn – "In My Arms" (2019)
- MK – "Body 2 Body" (2019)
- Ritual and Emily Warren – "Using" (2019)
- R Plus and Dido – "My Boy" (2019)
- Dermot Kennedy – "Power Over Me" (2020)
- Lifelike and Kris Menace – "Discopolis 2.0" (2020)
- John Legend featuring Gary Clark Jr. – "Wild" (2020)
- Faithless – "Innadadance" (feat. Suli Breaks & Jazzie B) (2021)
- Ed Sheeran – "Bad Habits" (2021)
- Florence and the Machine – "My Love" (2022)
- Mahmood and Blanco – "Brividi" (2022)
- Supermode - Tell Me Why (2022)
- GENESI - Everything You Have Done (2023)
- Calvin Harris and Sam Smith – "Desire" (2023)

== Awards and nominations ==
=== Grammy Awards ===
Year	Category	Work	Outcome	Ref.
2020	Best Dance Recording	"Piece of Your Heart"	Nominated	

=== International Dance Music Awards ===
Year	Category	Work	Outcome	Ref.
2020	Best Dance Song	"Piece of Your Heart"	Won	
2020	Breakthrough Artist of the Year	—N/a	Won	
2020	Best House Artist (Male)	—N/a	Nominated	
