= Marcel Stellman =

Belgian record producer (1925–2021)

Marcel Leopold Stellman (15 February 1925 – 2 May 2021) was a Belgian born British record producer and lyricist. Among the many artists who recorded Stellman’s songs are Cilla Black, Petula Clark, Charles Aznavour, the Shadows, Kathy Kirby, and Tony Bennett. In the UK he is best known as the man who brought the French show Des chiffres et des lettres to the UK as Countdown. His pseudonyms as a lyricist include Gene Martyn and Leo Johns.

Stellman was born in Antwerp, Belgium, one of 11 children. His mother, Lily, was Scottish and his father, Willy Stellman, was a Belgian Jew. In 1938, his father took him to his uncle Leopold’s jazz club, where he saw Louis Armstrong perform.

His father died of natural causes when he was young and five of his siblings were killed in Nazi death camps. However, his mother, who was Scottish, escaped the German invasion of Belgium in 1940 with the 14-year-old Marcel and settled in Glasgow.

Stellman's long association with the BBC began in the 1940s and 50s when he presented schools and children's radio programming. In the 1960s he worked on a television series for children featuring Pinky and Perky, two singing puppet pigs. In the 1980s he stood in for Alan Dell, presenting 'Sounds Easy' on BBC Radio 2.

He died on 2 May 2021 at the age of 96. The episode of Countdown broadcast on 4 May 2021 was dedicated to him.

Stellman won an Ivor Novello Award for the lyrics he wrote for the Shadows instrumental "Dance On!", which was a hit for Kathy Kirby in 1963. He also wrote the English lyrics to the songs Tulips from Amsterdam and Marmor, Stein und Eisen bricht (Marble Breaks and Iron Bends).
