= Werner Müller (musician) =

German composer (1920–1998)

- Born: 2 August 1920; Berlin, Germany
- Died: 28 December 1998 (aged 78); Cologne, Germany
- Occupation(s): Composer, conductor

Werner Müller (2 August 1920 – 28 December 1998) was a German composer, kapellmeister and conductor of light classical music and, to a greater extent, popular music. In some of his works, he collaborated with Caterina Valente and Horst Fischer, the trumpeter.

== Career ==
In 1949, Müller took over the then newly re-established dance orchestra of RIAS Berlin [American Sector Radio], whose style followed the formula of "swing with a lot of string".

In the 1950s and 1960s, Müller's was famous for his composition "Sport and Music" from the sports reporting in the weekly show. A world success became his arrangement of "Malagueña" in the mid -1950s, composed around 1928 by the Cuban composer Ernesto Lecuona, in the vocal version with multilingual singer Caterina Valente. Müller proudly named his own motor yacht after this title. As a producer, Müller helped many vocal Europe-based vocal soloists from the post-WWII years, such as Rita Paul, Mona Baptiste or Bully Buhlan.

After 18 years in West Berlin, Müller moved to Cologne in 1967, took over the WDR Big Band there and was also seen in many television shows. Over time, dozens of records were created with the name "Orchestra Werner Müller", of which very few have made it into the CD period. Because of the umlaut "Ü" in his name, Müller also called himself "Ricardo Santos" for records abroad. His many tango recordings and instrumental titles such as "Baia" by Brazilian composer Ary Barroso or the Lecuona songs "Siboney" and "Malagueña" as well as many other titles became successful. Numerous contemporary, including international hits, were re-recorded by the orchestra Werner Müller as instrumental versions and used in the WDR radio.

== Discography (LP) ==
Title	Year
Your Musical Holiday in Paris	1955
Your Musical Holiday in New York	1956
O, Tannenbaum Christmas on the Rhine	1956
Cherry Blossom Time In Japan	1957
Memories Of Heidelberg	1958
Werner Müller and His Orchestra – Music for Lovers	1961
Percussion In the Sky	1961
Welterfolge (Wild Strings)	1962
Noches Tropicales	1963
Werner Müller Plays Leroy Anderson	1964
Great Strauss Waltzes	1964
Werner Müller on Broadway	1964
Caterina Valente, Werner Müller and His Orchestra	1965
Germany	1965
Gypsy	1966
Party Rakete '66, Werner Müller Spielt Zum Tanz	1966
Echoes Of Italy	1969
Spectacular Tangos	1969
Golden Evergreens	1969
The Latin Splendor Of Werner Müller	1970
Songs Of Joy	1971
The Strip Goes On	1972
Learn To Love	1972
Caterina Valente With Werner Müller And His Orchestra – Love	1972
Tangos Espectaculares	1972
Tango!	1972
Horst Fischer, Werner Müller Und Sein Orchester – Yesterday Hits For Dancing	
Budenzauber (Crazy Party)	
Tanz Um Die Welt	
In A Gypsy Mood	
Music For Lovers	
Italia, Bella Italia	
Tropical Nights	
