= Bongo Cha Cha Cha =

1959 single by Caterina Valente

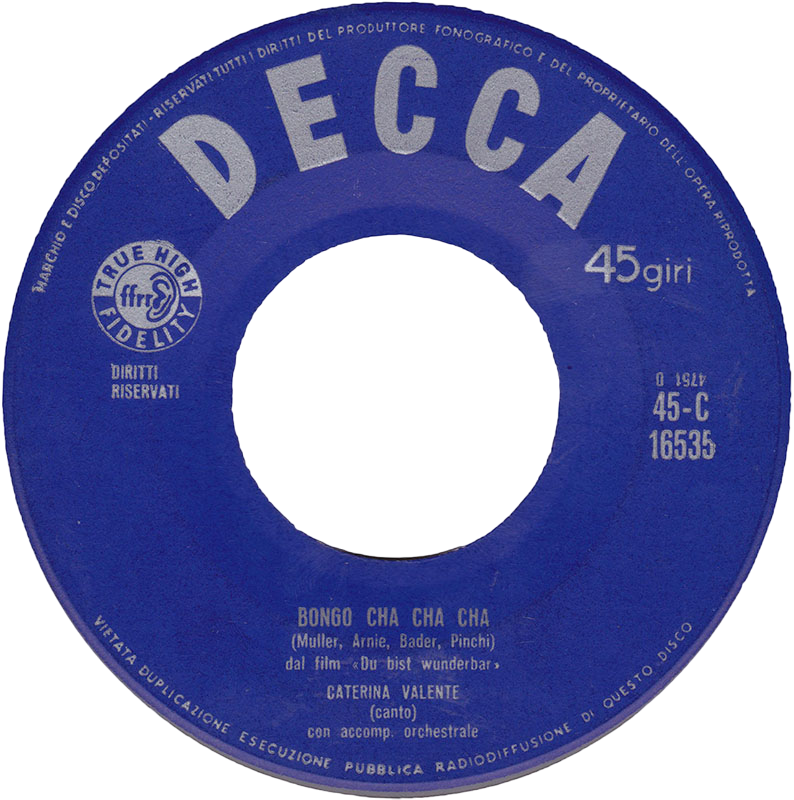
- Italian A-side label

Single by Caterina Valente

from the album Personalità
- Language: Italian
- B-side: "Guardando il cielo"
- Released: 1959
- Recorded: 1959
- Genre: Cha cha cha; Latin pop
- Length: 2:47
- Label: Decca Records
- Composers: Ernst Bader; Ralf Arnie; Werner Müller
- Lyricist: Giuseppe Perotti

Caterina Valente Italian singles chronology
"Un treno nel blu" (1959)	"Bongo Cha Cha Cha" (1959)	"Till" (1959)

Audio sample
- file; help

"Bongo Cha Cha Cha" is a 1959 song by French-Italian singer Caterina Valente, originally included on a German-language EP and best known in its Italian version, which was published as a single in 1959. The song became a big international hit, being translated into several languages including Spanish, French, English, Bulgarian and Serbo-Croatian. It saw a resurgence in popularity after being featured in the 2019 film Spider-Man: Far from Home and going viral on TikTok in 2021.

== Original version ==
=== Background ===
"Bongo Cha Cha Cha" was written by Ernst Bader, Ralf Arnie and Werner Müller, with the German version originally conducted by Müller and performed by Valente and her brother Silvio Francesco (as the duo Caterina und Silvio) in the Paul Martin movie Du bist wunderbar. Soon set to Italian lyrics by Giuseppe Perotti (under the pseudonym Pinchi), the song is one of the first examples of German- and Italian-language cha cha cha, a Latin American dance of Cuban origins successfully imported also in Europe since the 1950s.

By 1959, Valente had signed a recording contract with Decca Records, thanks to the success achieved internationally and in particular in the United States, where her singles had reached the top ten and her television appearances were warmly received by the public. The release of "Bongo Cha Cha Cha" was also a great success and was included in the Miss Personality album (titled Personalità in Italy), released in 1960. The single has been published in many countries including Germany, Yugoslavia, Australia, United States and Greece.

A Serbo-Croatian cover of the song was recorded by Ljiljana Petrović in 1962, and a Bulgarian one by Raina Deneva in 1964.

=== Revival ===
In 2013, "Bongo Cha Cha Cha" was included on the soundtrack to the French film Elle s'en va (On My Way), directed by Emmanuelle Bercot and starring Catherine Deneuve.

In 2019, "Bongo Cha Cha Cha", in its Italian version, was included on the soundtrack to Spider-Man: Far from Home, directed by Jon Watts, in the segment when Peter Parker (Tom Holland) and his schoolmates land in Venice, Italy; the song went viral, gaining renewed popularity. In 2021, it went viral again via the social media platform TikTok, thanks to its use for a trend that has collected over 250 million views, started from Latin countries and South America, and later in Italy and Germany.

Amid the 2021 resurgence in popularity, "Bongo Cha Cha Cha" was remixed by British group Goodboys in a house version which charted in several countries, as well as sampled in the Russian single "Na chile" by GeeGun featuring Egor Kreed, The Limba, Blago White, OG Buda, Timati, Soda Luv and Guf. In 2022, it was used in a Mecca Bingo advertisement and was covered by Maltese singer Emma Muscat (with accompaniment by the German Film Orchestra Babelsberg) for the compilation album TikTok Classics – Memes & Viral Hits.

=== Track listings ===
7" single "Bongo Cha Cha Cha" (Italy, 1959)

A. "Bongo Cha Cha Cha"

(Ernst Bader, Ralf Arnie, Werner Müller and Giuseppe Perotti)

B. "Guardando il cielo"

(Ernst Bader, Ralf Arnie, Werner Müller and Giuseppe Perotti)

Decca Records 45-C 16535

== Goodboys version ==
"Bongo Cha Cha Cha"

Single by Goodboys
- Language: Italian
- Released: 21 May 2021
- Recorded: 2021
- Genre: Cha cha cha; Latin pop; house
- Length: 1:53
- Label: Atlantic Records UK
- Composers: Ernst Bader; Ralf Arnie; Werner Müller
- Lyricist: Giuseppe Perotti
- Producers: Adrià Alemany García; Goodboys

Goodboys singles chronology
"Goodbye" (2020)	"Bongo Cha Cha Cha" (2021)	"Black & Blue" (2022)

Music video
- "Bongo Cha Cha Cha" on YouTube

In the wake of the TikTok revival, a house version remix of "Bongo Cha Cha Cha" was produced by the British house music group Goodboys, which peaked at number 23 in the Italian charts and number 6 in the Hungarian charts, as well as reaching number 1 in the Hungarian airplay. The song has totalled nearly 100 million streams on Spotify, reaching first place in the Viral Spotify Italia chart in July 2021 and appearing on the Switzerland Spotify chart in August 2021.

=== Credits and personnel ===
Credits adapted from AllMusic. Lyrics by Giuseppe Perotti and vocals by Caterina Valente are uncredited.

- Goodboys – primary artist, producer
- Ernst Bader – composer
- Ralf Arnie – composer
- Werner Müller – composer
- Adrià Alemany García – keyboards, mixing, percussions, producer, programmer
- Ethan Shore – keyboards, percussions, programmer
- Joshua Alexander Grimmett – keyboards, percussions, programmer
- Sam Wills – mastering

=== Charts and certifications ===
Chart performance for "Bongo Cha Cha Cha"
Chart (2021)	Peak position
Czech Republic (Singles Digitál Top 100)	73
Hungary (Single Top 40)	6
Hungary (Rádiós Top 40)	1
Italy (FIMI)	23
Italy Airplay (EarOne)	12

Certifications for "Bongo Cha Cha Cha"
Region	Certification	Certified units/sales
Italy (FIMI)	Platinum	70,000^{‡}
^{‡} Sales+streaming figures based on certification alone.
