= Tulips from Amsterdam =

Single by Max Bygraves
- B-side: "You Need Hands"
- Released: April 1958
- Recorded: 1958
- Genre: Traditional pop; schlager; music hall
- Length: 2:12
- Label: Decca 45-F.11004
- Songwriters: Gene Martyn, Ernst Bader, Klaus Günter Neumann, Ralf Arnie

Max Bygraves singles chronology
| ""We're Having A Ball"" | "Tulips from Amsterdam" | ""Gotta Have Rain"" |

"Tulips from Amsterdam" is a popular romantic song, best known in the 1958 hit version by British entertainer Max Bygraves. Most English versions of the song credit its composition to Klaus Günter Neumann, Ernst Bader, Ralf Arnie, and Gene Martyn.

The song was first written in 1953, as "Tulpen aus Amsterdam", by the German singer, songwriter and entertainer Klaus Günter Neumann, after he had performed at the Tuschinski theatre in Amsterdam and visited the tulip fields at Keukenhof. His music publisher did not like the song, but in 1956 the lyrics were seen by another songwriter, Ernst Bader, who rewrote the words and asked Dieter Rasch - who wrote under the pseudonym Ralf Arnie - to compose a new tune. The tune that Rasch used for the song has similarities to the "Flower Waltz" from Tchaikovsky's Nutcracker suite.

Though originally intended for the schlager singer Gerhard Wendland, in the event the song was first recorded in 1956, in both the original German version and a Dutch translation, "Tulpen uit Amsterdam", by the Flemish Belgian singer Jean Walter. His versions became hits in Europe. In 1957, an English version of the lyrics was written by Marcel Stellman of Decca Records (under the pseudonym Gene Martyn), and recorded by the English entertainer Max Bygraves. Released as a double A-side single with "You Need Hands", Bygraves' version reached no. 3 on the UK Singles Chart in 1958 and became one of his signature songs. The song has been recorded by many other musicians.
