= Goodboys =

English house music group

- Origin: London, England
- Genres: House; hip hop; trap; pop rap
- Occupations: Musician; DJ; rapper; singer; songwriter; record producer
- Years active: 2019–present
- Labels: Virgin; Polydor; Warner Music UK
- Members: Joshua Alexander Grimmett; Ethan Shore
- Past members: Johannes Shore
- Website: www.goodboysrecords.com

Goodboys are an English house music group consisting of Joshua Grimmett and Ethan Shore. Their breakthrough song "Piece of Your Heart", which was a collaboration with Italian production trio Meduza in 2019, reached number 2 on the UK Singles Chart and received a 2019 Grammy nomination for "Best Dance Recording". Their next single, "Lose Control", also with Meduza and with vocals from English singer Becky Hill was also a hit internationally.

== Discography ==
=== Singles ===
==== As lead artist ====
List of singles as lead artist, with selected chart positions, certifications and album name
Title	Year	Peak chart positions										Certifications	Album	Ref.
Title	Year	UK	AUS	BEL	GER	HUN	IRE	ITA	POL	SVK	SWE	Certifications	Album	Ref.
"Lose Control" (with Meduza and Becky Hill)	2019	11	11	6	30	11	7	37	11	9	96	BPI: 2× Platinum; ARIA: 4× Platinum; BEA: Platinum; BVMI: Platinum; FIMI: Platinum; GLF: Platinum; ZPAV: 3× Platinum	Get to Know	
"Unfamiliar" (with Seeb and Hrvy)	2020	—	—	—	—	—	—	—	—	—	—		Sad in Scandinavia	
"Goodbye" (with Imanbek)	2020	59	—	—	—	21	—	—	—	—	—		Non-album singles	
"Bongo Cha Cha Cha"	2021	—	—	—	—	6	—	23	—	—	—	FIMI: Platinum	Non-album singles	
"Black & Blue"	2022	—	—	—	—	—	—	—	—	—	—		Non-album singles	
"This Feeling" (with Vintage Culture)	2022	—	—	—	—	—	—	—	—	—	—		Non-album singles	
"Salvation" (with Maur)	2022	—	—	—	—	—	—	—	—	—	—		Non-album singles	
"Jack Flip"	2022	—	—	—	—	—	—	—	—	—	—		Non-album singles	
"Fractures" (with Julia Church)	2024	—	—	—	—	—	—	—	—	—	—		Non-album singles	
"Keep On Pushing" (with Marten Hørger and Poppy Baskcomb)	2024	—	—	—	—	—	—	—	—	—	—		Non-album singles	
"Paradise" (with KREAM)	2025	—	—	—	—	—	—	—	—	—	—		Non-album singles	
"Blindspot" (with Nu Aspect and AVAION)	2025	—	—	—	—	—	—	—	—	—	—		Non-album singles	
"Won't Be Possible" (with Tiesto and Odd Mob)	2025	—	—	—	—	—	—	—	30	—	—		Non-album singles	
"Utopia" (with Joris Voorn)	2025	—	—	—	—	—	—	—	—	—	—		Non-album singles	
"—" denotes a recording that did not chart or was not released.

==== As featured artist ====
List of singles as lead artist, with selected chart positions, certifications and album name
Title	Year	Peak chart positions										Certifications	Album	Ref.
Title	Year	UK	AUS	DEN	GER	IRE	ITA	NLD	NOR	POL	SWE	Certifications	Album	Ref.
"Piece of Your Heart" (Meduza featuring Goodboys)	2019	2	7	4	4	3	10	4	22	9	20	BPI: 3× Platinum; ARIA: 5× Platinum; BVMI: 3× Gold; FIMI: 3× Platinum; GLF: 2× Platinum; IFPI DEN: 2× Platinum; ZPAV: 4× Platinum	Non-album singles	
"Believe" (Acraze featuring Goodboys)	2022	—	—	—	—	—	—	—	—	28	—		Non-album singles	
"—" denotes a recording that did not chart or was not released.

=== Remixes ===
- 2021: Joel Corry and Jax Jones featuring Charli XCX and Saweetie - OUT OUT Goodboys Remix

=== Songwriting credits ===
Year	Artist	Album	Song	Co-written with
2020	Joy Club	Non-album single	"In the Night"	James Watts; Nathan Cross; Richard Boardman; Pablo Bowman; Sarah Blanchard; Simon de Jano; Luca de Gregorio; Mattia Vitale
2020	NOTD	TBA	"Nobody" (with Catello)	Samuel Brandt; Tobias Danielsson; Sandro Cavazza; Janne Kask; Victor Thell
2020	Meduza	TBA	"Paradise" (featuring Dermot Kennedy)	Simon de Jano; Luca de Gregorio; Mattia Vitale; Connor Manning; Daniel Caplen; Wayne Hector; Gerard O'Connell; Dermot Kennedy
2020	Seeb	Sad in Scandinavia	"Feel It Again" (with Svidden and Dan Caplen)	Simen Eriksrud; Espen Berg; Jimmy Koitzsch; David Bjork
2021	PS1	Non-album single	"Life Goes On" (featuring Alex Hosking)	Peter Conigliaro; Mark Alston; Ethan Shore; Alexandra Hosking
