= Dermot Kennedy discography =

Discography of Irish singer-songwriter

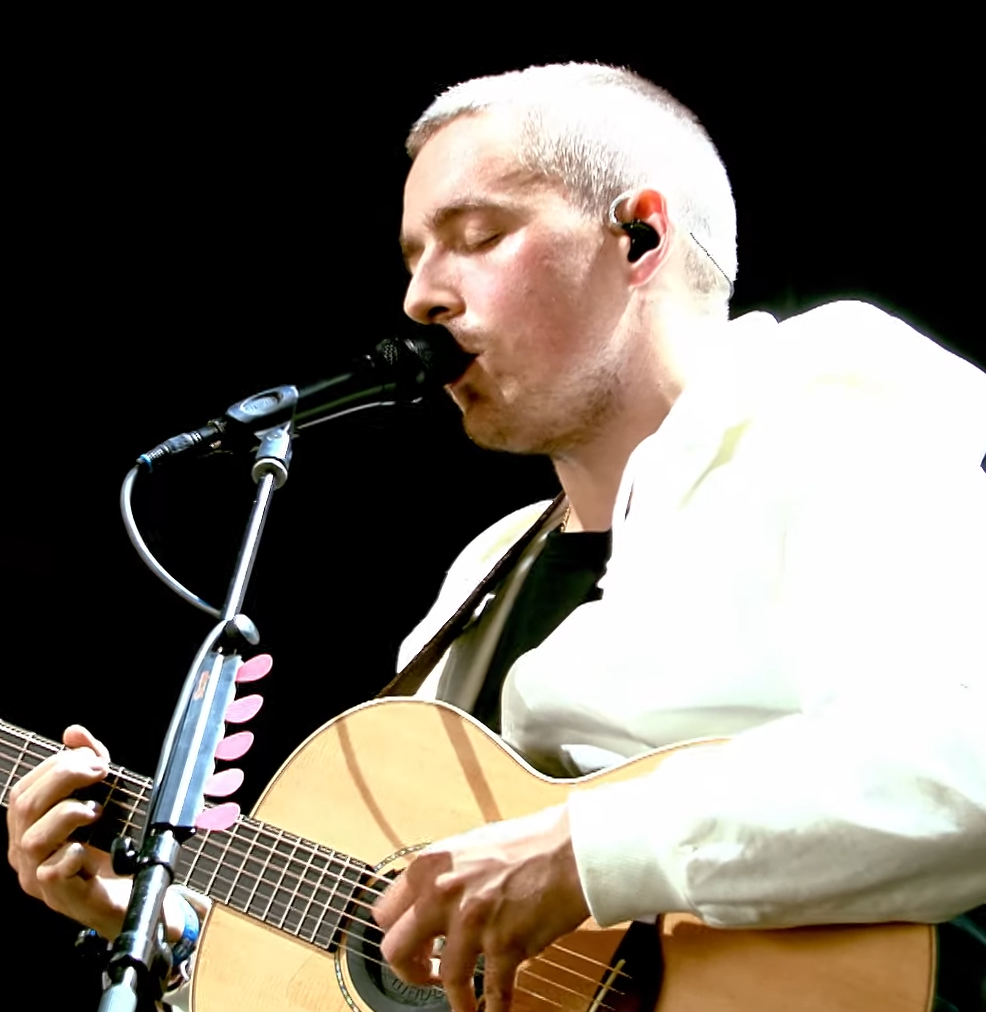
- Dermot Kennedy performing at the 2019 Lowlands Festival
- Studio albums: 3
- EPs: 5
- Compilation albums: 1
- Singles: 32
- Reissues: 1

The discography of Dermot Kennedy, an Irish singer-songwriter and musician, includes three studio albums, five extended plays, one compilation album, one reissue and thirty-two singles (including two as featured artist). His debut compilation album, Dermot Kennedy, was released in January 2019. The album peaked at number four on the Irish Albums Chart. His debut studio album, Without Fear, was released in October 2019. The album peaked at number one on the Irish Albums Chart. The album includes the singles "Moments Passed", "Power Over Me", "Lost" and "Outnumbered".

== Albums ==
=== Studio albums ===
| Title | Details | Peak chart positions | | | | | | | | | | Sales | Certifications |
| Title | Details | IRE | AUS | BEL (FL) | CAN | GER | NLD | NZ | SWE | UK | US | Sales | Certifications |
|---|---|---|---|---|---|---|---|---|---|---|---|---|---|
| Without Fear | Released: 4 October 2019; Label: Island (UK), Interscope (US); Formats: CD, LP, cassette, digital download, streaming | 1 | 37 | 10 | 11 | 11 | 27 | 23 | 48 | 1 | 18 | IRE: 7,000 | BPI: Platinum; MC: Platinum |
| Sonder | Released: 18 November 2022; Label: Island (UK), Interscope (US); Formats: CD, LP, cassette, digital download, streaming | 1 | 14 | 29 | 19 | 22 | 89 | — | — | 1 | 74 | | BPI: Gold |
| The Weight of the Woods | Released: 3 April 2026; Label: Island (UK), Interscope (US); Formats: CD, LP, cassette, digital download, streaming | 1 | 17 | 9 | 72 | 5 | 20 | 27 | — | 1 | 100 | | |

=== Compilation albums ===
| Title | Details | Peak chart positions | | Certifications |
| Title | Details | IRE | UK | Certifications |
|---|---|---|---|---|
| Dermot Kennedy | Released: 4 January 2019; Label: Riggins Recording; Formats: CD, digital download, streaming | 4 | 76 | BPI: Gold |

== Extended plays ==
| Title | Details |
|---|---|
| Dancing Under Red Skies | Released: 2010; Label: Dermot Kennedy; Formats: CD |
| Doves & Ravens | Released: 14 April 2017; Label: Island; Formats: Digital download, LP (2022 RSD exclusive) |
| Mike Dean Presents: Dermot Kennedy | Released: 5 April 2018; Label: Riggins Recording; Formats: Digital download, LP (2023) |
| Lost in the Soft Light | Released: 24 April 2020; Label: Island (UK), Interscope (US); Format: Digital download, LP (2024) |
| I've Told the Trees Everything | Released: 15 March 2024; Label: Island (UK), Interscope (US); Format: Digital download, LP |

== Singles ==
=== As lead artist ===
| Title | Year | Peak chart positions | | | | | | | | | | | Certifications | Album |
| Title | Year | IRE | BEL (FL) | FRA | GER | NLD | NZ Hot | SWE | SWI | UK | US Rock | US AAA | Certifications | Album |
|---|---|---|---|---|---|---|---|---|---|---|---|---|---|---|
| "An Evening I Will Not Forget" | 2015 | — | — | — | — | — | — | — | — | — | — | — | | Mike Dean Presents: Dermot Kennedy |
| "Shelter" | 2016 | — | — | — | — | — | — | — | — | — | — | — | | Dermot Kennedy |
| "After Rain" | 2016 | — | — | — | — | — | — | — | — | — | — | — | | Dermot Kennedy |
| "A Closeness" | 2017 | 58 | — | — | — | — | — | — | — | — | — | — | | Doves & Ravens |
| "All My Friends" | 2017 | 18 | — | — | — | — | — | — | — | 89 | — | — | BPI: Silver; MC: Gold | Doves & Ravens |
| "Moments Passed" | 2017 | — | 79 | — | — | — | — | — | — | — | — | — | MC: Gold | Mike Dean Presents: Dermot Kennedy |
| "Young & Free" | 2018 | 82 | — | — | — | — | — | — | — | — | — | — | | Mike Dean Presents: Dermot Kennedy |
| "Power Over Me" | 2018 | 11 | 10 | 73 | 37 | 35 | — | 56 | 29 | 27 | 21 | 5 | BPI: 2× Platinum; BVMI: Gold; MC: 2× Platinum; IFPI SWI: 2× Platinum; SNEP: Gold; RIAA: Gold | Dermot Kennedy |
| "For Island Fires and Family" | 2019 | 36 | — | — | — | — | — | — | — | — | — | — | | Dermot Kennedy |
| "Lost" | 2019 | 26 | — | — | — | — | — | — | — | — | 45 | — | ARIA: Gold; BPI: Silver; MC: Gold | Without Fear |
| "Outnumbered" | 2019 | 2 | 7 | — | 45 | — | 32 | — | 20 | 6 | 8 | 5 | ARIA: 2× Platinum; BPI: 2× Platinum; BVMI: Gold; IFPI SWI: Platinum; MC: Platinum; RIAA: Gold | Without Fear |
| "Resolution" | 2020 | — | — | — | — | — | — | — | — | — | — | — | | Songs for Australia |
| "Giants" | 2020 | 1 | 27 | — | 45 | — | 25 | 59 | 23 | 12 | 26 | 2 | ARIA: Gold; BPI: Platinum; BVMI: Gold; IFPI SWI: Platinum; MC: Gold | Without Fear (Digital bonus track) |
| "Power" (with Kevin Gates) | 2020 | — | — | — | — | — | — | — | — | — | — | — | RIAA: Gold | Non-album single |
| "Don't Cry" (with Bugzy Malone) | 2020 | 25 | — | — | — | — | — | — | — | 77 | — | — | | The Resurrection (Bugzy Malone second album) |
| "Better Days" | 2021 | 4 | 30 | — | — | 42 | 20 | — | — | 16 | — | 18 | ARIA: Platinum; BPI: Platinum; MC: Gold; RIAA: Gold | Sonder |
| "Something to Someone" | 2022 | 2 | — | — | — | — | 27 | — | — | 44 | — | 17 | BPI: Gold | Sonder |
| "Dreamer" | 2022 | 20 | — | — | — | — | — | — | — | — | — | — | | Sonder |
| "Kiss Me" | 2022 | 4 | — | 103 | 46 | — | 15 | — | 15 | 15 | — | — | BPI: Platinum | Sonder |
| "Innocence and Sadness" | 2022 | 12 | — | — | — | — | 34 | — | — | — | — | — | | Sonder |
| "One Life" | 2022 | 10 | — | — | — | — | 19 | — | — | 91 | — | — | | Sonder |
| "Don't Forget Me" | 2023 | 9 | — | — | — | — | — | — | — | — | — | — | | Sonder (2023 reissue) |
| "Won't Back Down" (with Bailey Zimmerman featuring YoungBoy Never Broke Again) | 2023 | 98 | — | — | — | — | — | — | — | — | — | — | | Fast X |
| "Sunday" | 2023 | 13 | — | — | — | — | 37 | — (Note: "Sunday" did not enter the Swedish Singellista Chart, but peaked at number 20 on the Swedish Heatseeker Chart.) | — | — | — | — | | I've Told the Trees Everything |
| "Two Hearts" | 2023 | 33 | — | — | — | — | 27 | — | — | — | — | — | | I've Told the Trees Everything |
| "Lucky" | 2024 | 37 | — | — | — | — | 30 | — | — | — (Note: "Lucky" did not enter the UK Singles Chart but peaked at number 62 on the UK Singles Downloads Chart.) | — | — | | I've Told the Trees Everything |
| "Let Me In" | 2025 | 17 | — | — | — | — | — | — | — | — | — | — | | Non-album single |
| "Melodies" | 2025 | — | — | — | — | — | — | — | — | — | — | — | | Nobody Wants This |
| "Funeral" | 2026 | 16 | — | — | — (Note: "Funeral" did not reach the Top 100 Single-Charts, but peaked at number 19 at the German airplay chart.) | — | 25 | — | — (Note: "Funeral" did not reach the Singles Top 100, but peaked at number 9 at the Swiss airplay chart.) | 82 | — | 20 | | The Weight of the Woods |
| "Refuge" | 2026 | 54 | — | — | — | — | 35 | — | — | — | — | — | | The Weight of the Woods |
| "Honest" | 2026 | 32 | — | — | — | — | 29 | — | — | — | — | — | | The Weight of the Woods |
| "Turnstile" | 2026 | 44 | — | — | — | — | 16 | — | — | — | — | — | | The Weight of the Woods |
| "Stockholm" | 2026 | — | — | — | — | — | — | — | — | — | — | — | | The Weight of the Woods (Deluxe) |
"—" denotes a recording that did not chart or was not released in that territory.

=== As featured artist ===
| Title | Year | Peak chart positions | | | | | | | | | Certifications | Album |
| Title | Year | IRE | AUS | CAN | BEL (FL) | GER | NLD | SWE | SWI | UK | Certifications | Album |
|---|---|---|---|---|---|---|---|---|---|---|---|---|
| "Times Like These" (as part of Live Lounge Allstars) | 2020 | 64 | — | — | 99 | — | — | — | — | 1 | BPI: Silver | Non-album single |
| "Paradise" (Meduza featuring Dermot Kennedy) | 2020 | 1 | 19 | 50 | 10 | 14 | 9 | 67 | 12 | 5 | ARIA: Platinum; BPI: Platinum; MC: 2× Platinum; RIAA: Platinum | Introducing Meduza |
"—" denotes a recording that did not chart or was not released in that territory.

== Other charted songs ==
| Title | Year | Peak chart positions | | Certifications | Album |
| Title | Year | IRE | NZ Hot | Certifications | Album |
|---|---|---|---|---|---|
| "Glory" | 2019 | 83 | — | | Doves & Ravens / Dermot Kennedy |
| "Rome" | 2019 | 5 | — | BPI: Silver | Without Fear |
| "What Have I Done" | 2019 | 6 | — | | Without Fear |
| "Days Like This" | 2020 | 21 | — | ARIA: Gold | Without Fear |
| "The Killer Was a Coward" | 2020 | 43 | — | | Without Fear |
| "Any Love" | 2022 | 13 | — | | Sonder |
| "Blossom" | 2023 | 40 | — | | Sonder |
| "Lessons" | 2024 | 37 | — | | I've Told the Trees Everything |
| "Endless" | 2026 | — | 39 | | The Weight of the Woods |
"—" denotes a recording that did not chart or was not released in that territory.

== Songwriting credits ==
| Title | Year | Artist | Album |
|---|---|---|---|
| "To Die For" | 2020 | Kygo | Golden Hour |
