= Lost (Dermot Kennedy song) =

Single by Dermot Kennedy

from the album Without Fear
- Released: 6 February 2019
- Length: 3:44
- Label: Riggins; Interscope; Island
- Songwriter(s): Carey Willetts; Dermot Kennedy
- Producer(s): Carey Willetts; Koz

Dermot Kennedy singles chronology
"For Island Fires and Family" (2019)	"Lost" (2019)	"Outnumbered" (2019)

"Lost" is a song by Irish singer-songwriter and musician Dermot Kennedy. It was released as a single on 6 February 2019 as the third single from his debut studio album Without Fear. The song peaked at number 26 on the Irish Singles Chart. The song was written by Carey Willetts and Dermot Kennedy.

== Critical reception ==
Claire Rowden from MTV gave the song a positive review stating, "What we love about Dermot's music is that he really makes his listeners feel heard, and seen, and this song is no exception to that. Pulling us in with his original and raspy voice, and then making us fall in love with his lyricism - he’s an artist unlike any other, and this song is proof of it."

== Music video ==
A music video to accompany the release of "Lost" was first released onto YouTube on 17 April 2019.

== Charts ==
Chart (2019)	Peak position
Ireland (IRMA)	26

== Certifications ==
Region	Certification	Certified units/sales
Australia (ARIA)	Gold	35,000^{‡}
Canada (Music Canada)	Gold	40,000^{‡}
United Kingdom (BPI)	Silver	200,000^{‡}
^{‡} Sales+streaming figures based on certification alone.

== Release history ==
Region	Date	Format	Label
Ireland	6 February 2019	Digital download	Riggins; Interscope; Island
