= Without Fear (album) =

Studio album by Dermot Kennedy
- Released: 4 October 2019
- Genre: Folk-pop
- Length: 50:31
- Label: Riggins; Interscope; Island
- Producer: Scott Harris; Charlie Hugall; Koz; Sir Nolan; Jonah Shai; Starsmith; Carey Willetts

Dermot Kennedy chronology
Dermot Kennedy (2019)	Without Fear (2019)	Sonder (2022)

Singles from Without Fear
- 1. "Moments Passed" Released: 19 September 2017; 2. "Power Over Me" Released: 16 October 2018; 3. "Lost" Released: 6 February 2019; 4. "Outnumbered" Released: 14 June 2019; 5. "Giants" Released: 24 June 2020

Without Fear is the debut studio album by Irish singer-songwriter Dermot Kennedy, released on 4 October 2019 by Riggins Recording, Interscope Records and Island Records. It has spawned four singles, including "Power Over Me" and "Outnumbered".

== Background ==
Kennedy announced the album on 13 June 2019, which coincided with the release of "Outnumbered". Pre-orders started that day, with an original release date of 27 September set. Kennedy revealed the track list on 9 September 2019. On 24 June 2020 a new single, "Giants", was released and added to the digital version of the album as the opening track.

== Chart performance ==
Without Fear debuted at number one on the Irish Albums Chart with sales of 7,000 units, becoming the fastest-selling album of 2019. It has spent 154 weeks in the top 10, including 27 non-consecutive weeks at the top of the chart as of 12 March 2021. In the UK the album debuted at number one with sales of 20,061 units, marking Kennedy's first number one outside Ireland.

== Track listing ==
Track listing and credits adapted from Kennedy's Instagram, as well as Apple Music and ASCAP.

No.	Title	Writer(s)	Producer(s)	Length
1.	"An Evening I Will Not Forget"	Dermot Kennedy	Carey Willetts	4:05
2.	"All My Friends"	Charlie Hugall; Kennedy	Willetts; Hugall; Koz	4:07
3.	"Power Over Me"	Kennedy; Scott Harris; Stephen Kozmeniuk	Koz	3:26
4.	"What Have I Done"	Kennedy; Harris; Nate Ruess; Kozmeniuk	Koz	3:37
5.	"Moments Passed"	Willetts; Kennedy; Micheál Quinn; Kozmeniuk	Willetts	4:31
6.	"The Corner"	Finlay Dow-Smith; Kennedy	Starsmith	3:21
7.	"Lost"	Willetts; Kennedy	Willetts; Koz	3:44
8.	"Rome"	Kennedy		3:22
9.	"Outnumbered"	Kennedy; Jay Mooncie; Harris; Kozmeniuk	Koz	4:05
10.	"Dancing Under Red Skies"	Kennedy	Koz	3:46
11.	"Outgrown"	Harris; Kennedy; Kozmeniuk	Jonah Shai; Harris	3:20
12.	"Redemption"	Harris; Kennedy; Nolan Lambroza; Kozmeniuk	Harris; Sir Nolan	3:48
13.	"Without Fear"	Kennedy; Willetts	Willetts	5:19
Total length:				50:31

Deluxe edition
No.	Title	Writer(s)	Producer(s)	Length
14.	"Glory"	Kennedy; Kozmeniuk		3:42
15.	"Young & Free"	Kennedy; Kozmeniuk		4:26
16.	"Couldn't Tell"	Ian Barter; Kennedy		4:16
17.	"For Island Fires and Family"	Kennedy	Willetts	4:45
Total length:				67:45

2020 re-release
No.	Title	Writer(s)	Producer(s)	Length
1.	"Giants"	Dermot Kennedy; Scott Harris; Stephen Kozmeniuk	Koz	2:57
2.	"An Evening I Will Not Forget"	Kennedy	Carey Willetts	4:05
3.	"All My Friends"	Charlie Hugall; Kennedy	Willetts; Hugall; Koz	4:07
4.	"Power Over Me"	Kennedy; Scott Harris; Stephen Kozmeniuk	Koz	3:26
5.	"What Have I Done"	Kennedy; Harris; Nate Ruess; Kozmeniuk	Koz	3:37
6.	"Moments Passed"	Willetts; Kennedy; Micheál Quinn; Kozmeniuk	Willetts	4:31
7.	"The Corner"	Finlay Dow-Smith; Kennedy	Starsmith	3:21
8.	"Lost"	Willetts; Kennedy	Willetts; Koz	3:44
9.	"Rome"	Kennedy		3:22
10.	"Outnumbered"	Kennedy; Jay Mooncie; Harris; Kozmeniuk	Koz	4:05
11.	"Dancing Under Red Skies"	Kennedy	Koz	3:46
12.	"Outgrown"	Harris; Kennedy; Kozmeniuk	Jonah Shai; Harris	3:20
13.	"Redemption"	Harris; Kennedy; Nolan Lambroza; Kozmeniuk	Harris; Sir Nolan	3:48
14.	"Without Fear"	Kennedy; Willetts	Willetts	5:19
Total length:				53:31

== Charts ==
=== Weekly charts ===
Chart (2019–2020)	Peak position
Australian Albums (ARIA)	37
Austrian Albums (Ö3 Austria)	33
Belgian Albums (Ultratop Flanders)	10
Belgian Albums (Ultratop Wallonia)	119
Canadian Albums (Billboard)	11
Dutch Albums (Album Top 100)	27
French Albums (SNEP)	148
German Albums (Offizielle Top 100)	11
Irish Albums (IRMA)	1
Lithuanian Albums (AGATA)	44
New Zealand Albums (RMNZ)	23
Norwegian Albums (VG-lista)	34
Scottish Albums (OCC)	1
Swedish Albums (Sverigetopplistan)	48
Swiss Albums (Schweizer Hitparade)	18
UK Albums (OCC)	1
US Billboard 200	18

=== Year-end charts ===
Chart (2019)	Position
Irish Albums (IRMA)	4
Chart (2020)	Position
Irish Albums (IRMA)	1
UK Albums (OCC)	47
Chart (2021)	Position
Irish Albums (IRMA)	2
UK Albums (OCC)	48
Chart (2022)	Position
UK Albums (OCC)	99

== Certifications ==
Region	Certification	Certified units/sales
Canada (Music Canada)	Platinum	80,000^{‡}
Denmark (IFPI Danmark)	Gold	10,000^{‡}
New Zealand (RMNZ)	Gold	7,500^{‡}
Poland (ZPAV)	Gold	10,000^{‡}
Switzerland (IFPI Switzerland)	Platinum	20,000^{‡}
United Kingdom (BPI)	Platinum	300,000^{‡}
^{‡} Sales+streaming figures based on certification alone.

== Release history ==
Region	Date	Format(s)	Edition(s)	Label	Ref.
Various	4 October 2019	CD; download; vinyl; cassette; streaming	Standard	Riggins; Interscope; Island	
Various	4 October 2019	LP	Deluxe	Riggins; Interscope; Island	
