= Young & Free (Dermot Kennedy song) =

Single by Dermot Kennedy

from the album Dermot Kennedy and the EP Mike Dean Presents: Dermot Kennedy
- Released: 9 March 2018
- Length: 4:26
- Label: Riggins; Interscope; Island
- Songwriter(s): Dermot Kennedy; Stephen Kozmeniuk
- Producer(s): Carey Willetts; Stephen Kozmeniuk

Dermot Kennedy singles chronology
"Moments Passed" (2017)	"Young & Free" (2018)	"Power Over Me" (2018)

"Young & Free" is a song by Irish singer-songwriter and musician Dermot Kennedy. It was released as a single on 9 March 2018. The song features on his compilation album, Dermot Kennedy and EP Mike Dean Presents: Dermot Kennedy. The song peaked at number 82 on the Irish Singles Chart.

== Background ==
The song was produced by Mike Dean. When talking about the song, Kennedy said, "Working with Mike Dean on this project was such an honour. 808s & Heartbreaks was one of my favourites from him, it was the perfect introduction for me to think about hip hop in a different way and play around with it. I just knew he'd get what I was trying to do with my sound… He put his stamp on the songs and was able to bring forward my love and appreciation for hip hop while keeping to its acoustic roots."

== Music video ==
A music video to accompany the release of "Young & Free" was first released onto YouTube on 23 May 2018.

== Personnel ==
Credits adapted from Tidal.

- Stephen Kozmeniuk – producer, composer, lyricist
- Dermot Kennedy – composer, lyricist
- Matty Green – mixer, studio personnel
- Carey Willetts – producer

== Charts ==
Chart (2018)	Peak position
Ireland (IRMA)	82

== Release history ==
Region	Date	Format	Label
Ireland	11 May 2018	Digital download; streaming	Riggins; Interscope; Island
