= Moments Passed =

Single by Dermot Kennedy

from the album Dermot Kennedy, Without Fear and the EP Mike Dean Presents: Dermot Kennedy
- Released: 19 September 2017
- Length: 4:31
- Label: Riggins; Interscope; Island
- Songwriters: Carey Willetts; Dermot Kennedy; Micheál Quinn; Stephen Kozmeniuk
- Producer: Carey Willetts

Dermot Kennedy singles chronology
"After Rain" (2016)	"Moments Passed" (2017)	"Young & Free" (2018)

"Moments Passed" is a song by Irish singer-songwriter and musician Dermot Kennedy. It was released as a single on 19 September 2017. A Mike Dean remix was included on the EP Mike Dean Presents: Dermot Kennedy (2018). The song also features on his compilation album, Dermot Kennedy (2019) and his debut studio album Without Fear (2019). Kozmeniuk.

== Critical reception ==
Niall Byrne from The Irish Times, gave the song a positive review stating, "Built on a twisted vocal sample with a clear Dublin accent, the local boy Dermot Kennedy fuses a singer-songwriter sensibility with modern production techniques to create a sound that is at once reaching and intimate. Kennedy is working with an international team already so it seems likely we’ll be hearing much more from him."

== Music video ==
A music video to accompany the release of "Moments Passed" was first released onto YouTube on 5 December 2017. The music video was directed by NABIL.

== Personnel ==
Credits adapted from Tidal.

- Carey Willetts – producer, composer, lyricist
- Manny Marroquin – mixer, studio personnel
- Dermot Kennedy – composer, lyricist
- Micheál Quinn – composer, lyricist
- Stephen Kozmeniuk – composer, lyricist

== Charts ==
Chart (2017)	Peak position
Belgium (Ultratip Bubbling Under Flanders)	29

== Certifications ==
Region	Certification	Certified units/sales
Canada (Music Canada)	Gold	40,000^{‡}
^{‡} Sales+streaming figures based on certification alone.

== Release history ==
Region	Date	Format	Label
Ireland	19 September 2017	Digital download; streaming	Riggins; Interscope; Island
