= Dermot Kennedy (disambiguation) =

Dermot Kennedy either refers to:

- Dermot Kennedy, an Irish singer and songwriter
- Dermot Kennedy (album), an album made by the same singer
