= Sonder (Dermot Kennedy album) =

Studio album by Dermot Kennedy
- Released: 18 November 2022
- Genre: Pop
- Length: 36:11
- Labels: Riggins; Interscope; Island
- Producers: Dan Nigro; Koz; Jonah Shy; Ryan Linvill; Cass Lowe; Scott Harris; Steve Mac

Dermot Kennedy chronology
Without Fear (2019)	Sonder (2022)	I've Told the Trees Everything (2024)

Singles from Sonder
- 1. "Better Days" Released: 28 July 2021; 2. "Something to Someone" Released: 5 May 2022; 3. "Kiss Me" Released: 2 September 2022; 4. "Innocence and Sadness" Released: 7 October 2022; 5. "One Life" Released: 25 November 2022; 6. "Don't Forget Me" Released: 7 June 2023

Sonder is the second studio album by Irish singer-songwriter Dermot Kennedy, released on 18 November 2022 through Riggins Recording, Interscope Records and Island Records. Originally scheduled to be released on 23 September 2022, its release was delayed twice: first to 4 November, then 18 November, with the latter due to the UK postal strike. The album was preceded by the singles "Better Days", "Something to Someone", "Dreamer", "Kiss Me" and "Innocence and Sadness" released prior to the album. Kennedy toured Europe, the UK and North America in 2023 in support of the record.

== Background and recording ==
Kennedy worked on the album in New York City. The title is a neologism referring to the "realization that each random passerby is living a life as vivid and complex as your own". The ballad "Innocence and Sadness" was recorded in one take.

== Singles ==
The single "Better Days" was released on 28 July 2021 and reached number four on the Irish Singles Chart and the top 20 on the UK Singles Chart. "Something to Someone" was promoted as the lead single and released on 5 May 2022, reaching number two in Ireland. "Dreamer" was released on 3 June 2022 and peaked at number 20 in Ireland.. "Kiss Me" was released on 2 September 2022 and peaked at number four on the Irish Singles Chart. "Innocence and Sadness" was released on 7 October 2022 and peaked at number 12 Ireland.

== Critical reception ==
Professional ratings
Review scores
Source	Rating
AllMusic	4/5 stars
The Arts Desk	2/5 stars
Evening Standard	3/5 stars
Hot Press	7.5/10
The Irish Times	3/5 stars
The Upcoming	3/5 stars

Barney Harsent of The Arts Desk called the album "crowd-pleasing, high-polish pop" with "sparse accompaniments hiding in the wings giving Kennedy's voice the spotlight and space to fire up the feels", but felt "none of it screams raw emotion. [...] It's music almost completely devoid of edge, almost impressively so". Harsent concluded that while it "does exactly what you'd expect", he found himself "wishing it did something else". Lauren Murphy of The Irish Times described Sonder as "another record of solid emotional pop songs that run the gamut from heartache to cautious optimism" although neither Kennedy's "musical nor his lyrical themes have developed in any groundbreaking manner since his 2018 debut Without Fear". While Murphy felt that it will "matter little to Kennedy's established fan base", "it comes across as a missed opportunity to prove his worth as a songwriter with original ideas rather than a one-trick pony".

== Track listing ==
Sonder track listing
No.	Title	Writer(s)	Producer(s)	Length
1.	"Any Love"	Dermot Kennedy; Scott Harris; Jonah Seth Rawitz	Harris; Jonah Shy	2:13
2.	"Something to Someone"	Kennedy; Samuel Romans; Harris; Rawitz	Harris; Shy	3:18
3.	"Kiss Me"	Kennedy; Daniel Smith; Stephen Kozmeniuk; Steve McCutcheon	Harris; Koz; Steve Mac	3:49
4.	"Dreamer"	Kennedy; Harris; Daniel Nigro	Harris; Nigro; Ryan Linvill^{[a]}	3:01
5.	"Innocence and Sadness"	Kennedy	Harris; Shy	4:12
6.	"Divide"	Kennedy; Amy Allen; Linvill; Harris; Nigro	Harris; Nigro; Linvill^{[c]}	3:23
7.	"Homeward"	Kennedy; Harris; Rawitz	Harris; Shy; Kenny Beats^{[a]}	3:38
8.	"One Life"	Kennedy; Cass Lowe	Harris; Lowe; Emile Haynie^{[a]}	4:00
9.	"Better Days"	Kennedy; Romans; Harris; Nigro; Carey Willetts	Nigro; Linvill^{[a]}; Clarence Coffee Jr.^{[v]}; Neil Goody^{[v]}; Curtis Elvidge^{[v]}	3:18
10.	"Already Gone"	Kennedy; Scott; Rawitz	Harris; Shy	2:41
11.	"Blossom"	Kennedy; David Hodges; Steve Solomon	Harris; Shy; Hodges^{[c]}; Solomon^{[c]}	2:39
Total length:				36:16

2023 reissue
No.	Title	Writer(s)	Producer(s)	Length
8.	"Don't Forget Me"	Kennedy; Lowe	Harris; Lowe; Haynie; PRGRSHN^{[a]}	3:10
9.	"One Life"	Kennedy; Lowe	Lowe; Haynie	3:57
10.	"Better Days"	Kennedy; Romans; Harris; Nigro; Willetts	Nigro; Linvill^{[a]}; Coffee^{[v]}; Goody^{[v]}; Elvidge^{[v]}	3:18
11.	"Already Gone"	Kennedy; Scott; Rawitz	Harris; Shy	2:41
12.	"Blossom"	Kennedy; Hodges; Solomon	Harris; Shy; Hodges^{[c]}; Solomon^{[c]}	2:39
Total length:				39:26

Notes

- ^{^[c]} signifies a co-producer
- ^{^[a]} signifies an additional producer
- ^{^[v]} signifies a vocal producer

== Personnel ==
Musicians

- Dermot Kennedy – vocals (all tracks), piano (tracks 1, 2, 5, 7, 10, 11), guitar (3, 11)
- Jonah Shy – synthesizer (1, 2, 7, 10, 11); guitar, programming (1, 2, 10, 11); drum programming (1, 7, 10, 11), Rhodes (1), drums (2), piano (2, 10)
- Scott Harris – bass, guitar (2); piano (4), synthesizer (7)
- Todd Clark – background vocals (3)
- Chris Laws – drum programming (3)
- Stephen Kozmeniuk – drums, guitar, keyboards (3)
- Mark Schick – guitar (3)
- Dave Cohen – Hammond B3, piano (3)
- Steve Mac – keyboards (3)
- Dan Pursey – percussion (3)
- Ryan Linvill – drum programming, saxophone (4, 5, 9); synthesizer (4, 5), acoustic guitar (4), guitar (5), synthesizer programming (9)
- Daniel Nigro – drum programming, piano (4, 5, 9); acoustic guitar, Mellotron (4); background vocals, bass (5, 9); percussion, synthesizer (5); keyboards (9)
- Kenny Beats – drum programming, synthesizer (7)
- Cass Lowe – background vocals, drums, guitar, piano, programming, synthesizer (8)
- Emile Haynie – drums, programming, synthesizer (8)
- Chappell Roan – background vocals (9)
- Steve Solomon –drum programming, guitar, piano, programming, synthesizer (11)
- David Hodges – drum programming, guitar, piano, programming, synthesizer (11)

Technical

- Randy Merrill – mastering
- Matty Green – mixing (1, 2, 4, 9, 11), engineering (9)
- Mark "Spike" Stent – mixing (3, 8)
- Jamie Snell – mixing (5–7, 10)
- Mitch McCarthy – mixing (9)
- Matt Wolach – mix engineering (3)
- Kyle Haas – engineering (1, 10)
- Jonah Shy – engineering (2, 7, 11)
- Chris Laws – engineering (3)
- Dan Pursey – engineering (3)
- Ryan Linvill – engineering (4, 5, 9)
- Jake Libassi – engineering (5)
- Ed McEntee – engineering (11)
- Carey Willetts – vocal engineering (9)

== Charts ==
Chart performance for Sonder
Chart (2022–2023)	Peak position
Australian Albums (ARIA)	14
Austrian Albums (Ö3 Austria)	28
Belgian Albums (Ultratop Flanders)	29
Belgian Albums (Ultratop Wallonia)	90
Canadian Albums (Billboard)	19
Dutch Albums (Album Top 100)	89
German Albums (Offizielle Top 100)	22
Irish Albums (Official Charts)	1
Scottish Albums (Official Charts)	1
Swiss Albums (Schweizer Hitparade)	18
UK Albums (Official Charts)	1
US Billboard 200	74

== Certifications ==
Certifications for Sonder
Region	Certification	Certified units/sales
Canada (Music Canada)	Gold	40,000^{‡}
United Kingdom (BPI)	Gold	100,000^{‡}
^{‡} Sales+streaming figures based on certification alone.
