= Someone to You =

2017 single by Banners

Single by Banners

from the album Where the Shadow Ends
- Released: 9 June 2017
- Recorded: 2017
- Genre: Pop rock, Indie rock
- Length: 3:39
- Label: Island
- Songwriters: Grant Michaels; Michael Nelson; Sam Hollander
- Producer: Stephen Kozmeniul

Banners singles chronology
"Holy Ground" (2016)	"Someone to You" (2017)	"Firefly" (2017)

Music video
- "Someone to You" on YouTube

"Someone to You" is a song by English musician Banners, released in June 2017 as the third single from Banners second extended play Empires on Fire and his second album Where the Shadow Ends. The song is a declaration of the willingness to fully commit to a relationship. The declaration is delivered in a spirited melody and is reinforced by gang backing vocals.

Though it did not chart at the time of its release, it later became a viral sleeper hit in 2020 after gaining popularity on the TikTok video sharing app.

== Background and release ==
"Someone to You" was released in June 2017.

In 2020, it was used in a trailer for a TV show, in a movie, in a T-Mobile commercial and on TikTok. The song's success took Banners by surprise saying at first, he had no idea why the track was getting so many unexpected streams: "I try not to look at my Spotify numbers too much...but every now and then I was just checking it and it was like, 'This is getting more and more popular every week. So I went to the record label...and I was like, 'Can we find out what's going on, please?''"

In January 2021, he performed the song at Live with Kelly and Ryan.

== Critical reception ==
The Spill Magazine called the song "magnetic and warm, capturing the simple pleasures of falling in love, while maintaining the thought-provoking choral components that define the Banners sound."

Mary Chang from There Goes the Fear said "The song is a wonderful foot-stomper, with an incessant, irrepressible beat, and lyrics that beg to be sung along to."

== Track listings ==
- Digital single
1. "Someone to You" – 3:39
- Digital single
1. "Someone to You" (acoustic) – 3:34
- Digital single
1. "Someone to You" (The DJ Mike D Mix) – 3:26
- Digital single
1. "Someone to You" (The DJ Mike D Mix) – 3:26
- Digital single
1. "Someone to You" – 3:39
2. "Someone to You" (acoustic) – 3:34
3. "Someone to You" (Philip George Mix) – 3:27
4. "Someone to You" (Stripped) – 3:40
5. "Someone to You" (The DJ Mike D Mix) – 3:26
6. "Someone to You" (Pilton Remix) – 3:44

== Charts ==
=== Weekly charts ===
Weekly chart performance for "Someone to You"
Chart (2017–2021)	Peak position
Australia (ARIA)	97
Belgium (Ultratop 50 Flanders)	8
Belgium (Ultratop 50 Wallonia)	11
Canada (Canadian Hot 100)	60
Germany (GfK)	100
Hungary (Single Top 40)	31
Ireland (IRMA)	41
Netherlands (Dutch Top 40)	6
Netherlands (Single Top 100)	16
New Zealand Hot Singles (RMNZ)	25
Portugal (AFP)	182
UK Singles (OCC)	60
US Bubbling Under Hot 100 (Billboard)	18
US Adult Top 40 (Billboard)	11
US Hot Rock & Alternative Songs (Billboard)	11

=== Year-end charts ===
2020 year-end chart performance for "Someone to You"
Chart (2020)	Position
Belgium (Ultratop Flanders)	36
Netherlands (Dutch Top 40)	22
Netherlands (Single Top 100)	78
US Hot Rock & Alternative Songs (Billboard)	73

2021 year-end chart performance for "Someone to You"
Chart (2021)	Position
Belgium (Ultratop Flanders)	62
Belgium (Ultratop Wallonia)	77
Iceland (Tónlistinn)	93
US Adult Top 40 (Billboard)	32
US Hot Rock & Alternative Songs (Billboard)	35

== Certifications ==
Certifications for "Someone to You"
Region	Certification	Certified units/sales
Australia (ARIA)	Platinum	70,000^{‡}
Belgium (BRMA)	Platinum	40,000^{‡}
Brazil (Pro-Música Brasil)	2× Platinum	120,000^{‡}
Canada (Music Canada)	Platinum	80,000^{‡}
Denmark (IFPI Danmark)	Platinum	90,000^{‡}
France (SNEP)	Platinum	200,000^{‡}
Germany (BVMI)	Gold	200,000^{‡}
Italy (FIMI)	Platinum	100,000^{‡}
Netherlands (NVPI)	Platinum	40,000^{‡}
New Zealand (RMNZ)	2× Platinum	60,000^{‡}
Poland (ZPAV)	Platinum	50,000^{‡}
Portugal (AFP)	Platinum	10,000^{‡}
Spain (Promusicae)	Platinum	60,000^{‡}
United Kingdom (BPI)	Platinum	600,000^{‡}
United States (RIAA)	2× Platinum	2,000,000^{‡}
Streaming
Sweden (GLF)	Platinum	8,000,000^{†}
^{‡} Sales+streaming figures based on certification alone.^{†} Streaming-only figures based on certification alone.
