= Nem-catacoa =

Nem-catacoa may refer to:

- Nencatacoa, the Muisca god of arts, crafts, dance and drunkenness
- Nem-Catacoa Festival, an annual music festival in Bogotá, the ancient capital of the southern Muisca and currently of Colombia
