= RedFaces =

British band

- Origin: Sheffield, England
- Genres: Indie pop; indie rock; Alternative pop
- Years active: 2012–2020
- Labels: Sony Music UK; RCA
- Past members: Harry Lyon; Charlie Yapp; Isaac White; Andrew Wynn; Ryan Laycock; See also: Members
- Website: https://www.redfacesmusic.com/

RedFaces were a British indie pop band from Sheffield, South Yorkshire. The band has three members: Harry Lyon, Isaac White and Charlie Yapp. The band signed to Sony Music UK's RCA Records in 2015.

== Biography ==
RedFaces were a 3-piece indie rock band formed in Dronfield, Derbyshire in 2012 when the 3 founding members were still at school. Originally performing covers, they quickly started adding original material to their live set and soon began attracting the attention of the local music community with their energetic live performances.

The band gained an early fan in Dean Jackson, from BBC Introducing in the East Midlands, after they uploaded an early demo, leading to the band being invited to perform on the Allotment stage at the YNOT Festival in 2014.

In January 2015 the band uploaded a new track, "Katie Come Home" to BBC Introducing, which led to widespread interest from the UK Record Industry. The track also received widespread radio play on both local BBC stations as well as Huw Stephens from Radio 1, and John Kennedy from Radio X.

BBC Introducing invited the band to again play YNOT Festival, this time on the large second stage, The Quarry. Despite an early afternoon slot the tent was filled to its capacity of 2000.

The band played at T in The Park in July 2015. In August of where invited to open the Leeds Festival on the DTTR stage on the Thursday night of the festival, having impressed the promoters earlier in the year when performing at Live At Leeds.

The band released their first single "Kerosene" on 16 December 2016, under RCA. and commenced their first full UK tour in support of the single on 20 January 2017, staying out on the road until the beginning of March. "Kerosene" received airplay from Huw Stephens and Phil Taggart on BBC Radio 1, as well as being added to the evening playlist for Radio X. The accompanying video for "Kerosene", shot on location in Sheffield and Derbyshire, was added to the MTV Rocks playlist.

The origin behind their band name was revealed during an interview with Clash Magazine.

"We were pretty young, actually, because we were still only playing covers back then. We all went bright red! We didn’t have a name, and then someone suggested it to us and it stuck.” - Harry Lyon

The band's follow-up single, "Wise Up" was released on 19 May 2017, with Huw Stephens giving the track its national debut on BBC Radio 1 the day before to coincide with the band's appearance at The Great Escape Festival in Brighton. In July 2017, the band performed live at Truck Festival in Staffordshire. The band also performed at Dot to Dot Festival, Kendal Calling, Isle of Wight Festival, Community Festival, and TRSMT throughout the summer of 2017, as well as touring with Australian band DMA'S.

The band released, "Take It Or Leave It" on 17 September 2017 and received airplay from BBC Radio 1's Huw Stephens and BBC 6 Music’s Steve Lamacq, adding it to BBC Radio 1's daytime playlist as BBC Introducing Track Of The Week. The band closed out 2017 with another full UK tour and were named by MTV Rocks as one of the most exciting new bands to come out of the UK in 2018.

In January 2018, the band leaked footage from the recording studio, hinting that the follow-up to "Take It Or Leave It" would be released shortly. NME named the band in the NME 100 on 18 January alongside Yonaka and The Pale White - "Take It Or Leave It" and "Kerosene" are magnificent launching pads for the group." - Thomas Smith, NME

On 13 March 2018 Huw Stephens announced the exclusive first play of new single, "Messed Up Feeling" on BBC Radio 1, making it the 4th consecutive single to receive National Airplay on the station. "Messed Up Feeling" also received airplay from Steve Lamacq on 6 Music and Radio X. As with "Take It Or Leave It" the single was produced by Carey Willetts from the band Athlete (band). The video to accompany the single was added to the playlists for MTV Rocks and The Box, where it remained for 5 and 4 weeks respectively. It was also featured on Sunday Brunch on Channel 4.

Following the release the band announced a series of festival appearances, including All Points East, Tramlines, Boardmasters, Bingley Music Live and a return to YNOT after a years absence, this time on the main stage.

The band released "Way Down" in August 2018. Their fifth single, the song took a slight shift in the musical style - incorporating more electronic musical elements and influences from Psychedelic pop and Contemporary R&B . The single again received its debut on BBC Radio 1 with the accompanying video being playlisted on MTV Rocks. The tour in support of the single included dates with Reverend and The Makers, as well as the announcement of a joint headline tour across the UK with Blackwaters and Retro Video Club.

The band announced their break up in February 2020, releasing "Getting Away With It" as a final single. Subsequently, Harry announced his continuation as a solo artist and has debuted clips of new material on his Instagram account. Similarly, Isaac announced the beginning of a new synthwave project called sadbot. Charlie is currently working as a session drummer, whilst managing a pub.

== Members ==
- Harry Lyon - guitar, vocals (2012 - 2020)
- Charlie Yapp - drums, vocals (2012 - 2020)
- Isaac White - bass, vocals, guitar, keyboards (2012 - 2020)
- Haydn Walters - bass (2012)
- Andrew Wynn - guitar (2012- 2016)
- Ryan Laycock - guitar (2016 - 2018)

Touring members

- Will Puddephat - guitar, keyboards (2018)
- Will Crumpton - guitar, keyboards (2018)
- Ferg Moran - guitar, keyboards (2018)
- Toby Holmes - guitar, keyboards (2018-2019)
- Isaac Vohra - guitar, keyboards (2019)

== Discography ==
- "Kerosene" (2016)
- "Wise Up" (2017)
- "Take It Or Leave It" (2017)
- "Messed Up Feeling" (2018)
- "Way Down" (2018)
- "Getting Away With It" (2020)
