= The Weight of the Woods =

Studio album by Dermot Kennedy
- Released: 3 April 2026
- Length: 50:22
- Labels: Riggins; Interscope; Island
- Producer: Gabe Simon

Dermot Kennedy chronology
I've Told the Trees Everything (2024)	The Weight of the Woods (2026)

Singles from The Weight of the Woods
- 1. "Funeral" Released: 21 January 2026; 2. "Refuge" Released: 20 February 2026; 3. "Honest" Released: 20 March 2026; 4. "Turnstile" Released: 24 April 2026

Singles from The Weight of the Woods (Deluxe)
- 1. "Stockholm" Released: 11 September 2026

The Weight of the Woods is the third studio album by the Irish singer-songwriter Dermot Kennedy, released on 3 April 2026 through Interscope Records and Island Records. The album debuted at number one on the UK Albums Chart, making Kennedy the first Irish solo artist to top the chart with their first three studio albums.

A deluxe edition was released on 11 September 2026.

== Track listing ==
The Weight of the Woods track listing
No.	Title	Writer(s)	Producer(s)	Length
1.	"The Weight of the Woods (Reprise)"	Dermot Kennedy; Sam Roman; Gabe Simon; Sam Westhoff	Simon; Maddie Harmon^{[b]}	1:04
2.	"Honest"	Kennedy; Simon	Simon	3:39
3.	"Refuge"	Kennedy; Mikky Ekko; Simon	Simon; Harmon^{[b]}	3:38
4.	"Funeral"	Kennedy; Gregory Hein; Carrie K; Simon	Simon; Rob Kirwan^{[a]}; Carrie K^{[b]}	4:03
5.	"Endless"	Kennedy; Simon; Carey Willetts	Simon; Willetts^{[a]}	3:46
6.	"Sycamore"	Kennedy; Simon; Westhoff	Simon	3:45
7.	"Often, Lately"	Kennedy; Simon; Joel Stagg; Westhoff; Willetts	Simon	3:19
8.	"Turnstile"	Kennedy; Simon; Westhoff; Willetts	Simon; Willetts^{[a]}; Carrie K^{[b]}	3:50
9.	"Wasted"	Kennedy; Simon; Westhoff; Willetts	Simon	3:43
10.	"Blue Eyes"	Kennedy; Willetts	Willetts	3:37
11.	"Trepidation"	Kennedy; Simon; Westhoff; Willetts	Simon; Willetts^{[a]}	4:07
12.	"The Only Time I Prayed"	Kennedy; Willetts	Willetts; Simon^{[a]}	4:29
13.	"Happiness"	Kennedy; Fred Ball; Amy Wadge	Simon	3:33
14.	"The Weight of the Woods"	Kennedy; Roman; Simon; Westhoff	Simon; Harmon^{[b]}	3:42
Total length:				50:22

The Weight of the Woods (Deluxe) track listing
No.	Title	Length
15.	"Black Water"	4:02
16.	"Deserve"	4:21
17.	"Stockholm"	5:44
18.	"Funeral" (acoustic)	4:00
19.	"Turnstile" (acoustic)	3:44

=== Notes ===
- ^{^[a]} indicates an additional producer
- ^{^[b]} indicates an assistant producer

== Personnel ==
Credits are adapted from Tidal.

=== Musicians ===
- Dermot Kennedy – vocals (all tracks), bodhrán (track 2), percussion (3), background vocals (4, 6–9, 11, 13), acoustic guitar (10, 13)
- Joel Stagg – bird song (1), background vocals (4), wind machine (7), sound effects (14)
- Maynooth University Chamber Choir – choir vocals (1, 6–8)
- Michael T. Dawson – chorus direction (1, 6–8)
- Gabe Simon – bass (2–5, 7, 8, 11), acoustic guitar (2–4, 6–9, 11, 13), background vocals (2–4, 7–9, 13), mandolin (2, 3), piano (2, 4), bouzouki (2, 8, 9), drums (2), percussion (3, 4, 8, 9); accordion baritone guitar (3); electric guitar (4, 6, 13), Hammond B3 (4, 11, 13); Mellotron, strings direction (4); upright bass (6, 9, 11–13); bodhrán, foot stomp (6); 12-string acoustic guitar, slide guitar (7); synthesizer (8, 11), kalimba (9, 11), drums (9); programming, pump organ, Rhodes (11); banjo (13)
- Sam Westhoff – piano (2, 5–9, 11–14), drums (2, 6, 9, 11), percussion (2, 6, 11), background vocals (2, 8, 9), organ (2)
- Kevin Frieden – tin whistle (2)
- Carrie K – drums (3, 4, 8), background vocals (4), percussion (8)
- Colm Mac Con Iomaire – violin (3, 5)
- Mikky Ekko – background vocals (3)
- Noah Levine – electric guitar (3)
- Muireann Ní Shé – uilleann pipes (3)
- Benjamin Kaufman – strings direction, violin, viola, cello (4)
- Carey Willetts – programming (5, 8, 9, 11, 12), synthesizer (10, 12), piano (10); drums, pump organ, Rhodes (12)
- Kåre Nymark – horn (5, 12)
- John Mailander – violin (8)
- Claire Kinsella – cello (10)
- Cormac Begley – concertina (13)

=== Technical ===
- Oli Jacobs – mixing (all tracks), engineering (4, 5), additional engineering (2, 7, 8), engineering assistance (3)
- Fraser Latimer – mixing assistance (1–3, 5–14)
- Sam Westhoff – engineering (1–3, 5–13)
- Gabe Simon – engineering (4, 5), additional engineering (8)
- Carey Willetts – engineering (10, 12), engineering assistance (5)
- Kevin Frieden – engineering assistance (1, 2, 6, 7, 9, 11, 12, 14), additional engineering (3, 5)
- Maddie Harmon – engineering assistance (2, 7, 8, 13), additional engineering (3, 4)
- Alberto Sewald – additional engineering (4)
- Donogh Hennessey – additional engineering (13)
- Ruairi O'Flaherty – mastering

== Charts ==
Chart performance for The Weight of the Woods
Chart (2026)	Peak position
Australian Albums (ARIA)	17
Austrian Albums (Ö3 Austria)	13
Belgian Albums (Ultratop Flanders)	9
Belgian Albums (Ultratop Wallonia)	35
Canadian Albums (Billboard)	72
Dutch Albums (Album Top 100)	20
French Physical Albums (SNEP)	124
German Albums (Offizielle Top 100)	5
Irish Albums (Official Charts)	1
New Zealand Albums (RMNZ)	27
Scottish Albums (Official Charts)	1
Swiss Albums (Schweizer Hitparade)	7
UK Albums (Official Charts)	1
US Billboard 200	100
