= Banners (EP) =

EP by Banners
- Released: 15 January 2016
- Genre: Alternative rock
- Length: 19:28
- Label: Island
- Producer: Stephen Kozmeniuk

Banners chronology
Banners (2016)	Empires on Fire (2017)

Singles from Banners
- 1. "Ghosts" Released: March 2015; 2. "Shine a Light" Released: August 2015; 3. "Start a Riot" Released: 4 December 2015

Banners is the debut extended play by English musician Banners, produced by Stephen Kozmeniuk. It was released on 15 January 2016 through Island Records. The EP has charted in Canada. Banners includes three songs that were released as singles throughout 2015 – "Ghosts", "Shine a Light" and "Start a Riot" – as well as two new tracks, "Gold Dust" and" "Back When We Had Nothing".

== Composition ==
The EP's first track, "Start a Riot", is a "soaring pop track", an "emotional, sensitive and melodically organic indie rock" song. It opens with electronic, echoing backing vocals and a simple piano line. Banners' falsetto vocals emerge in the chorus and "the heart of the song is exposed". The lyrics are personal and serve as an ode to a loved one, describing the lengths to which the narrator would go for them.

"Shine a Light" is an uplifting anthem, a "piano ballad turned stadium epic". It starts with "chunky" piano chords and features "thundering" drums, with Banners' falsetto vocals piercing through. Towards the end of the track, lead guitar escalates to "full-on" stadium rock. Lyrically, the song is about being lost at sea and searching for a "beacon of light", a "glimmer of hope that brings you through the storm". Banners said in interviews that "it's a song to the person in your life that offers salvation while the storm is raging around you", and that he was away from home and feeling lonely when he was writing the song.

The fourth track on the EP, "Ghosts", is a "haunting piano ballad", which starts slowly, with a few piano chords that match the vocals. After one minute, kick drum and strings enter and the songs starts building momentum at the 2:22 mark. According to Banners, the song is about his dreams and nightmares. "It's about having someone to fight the world with. It's about love and loss, but also the idea that these feelings don't stop just because a relationship does."

== Promotion ==
The first single from the EP, "Ghosts", was originally released in March 2015 under the stage name Raines. A music video for the song was directed by Christopher Ranson.

The second single from the EP, "Shine a Light", was released in August 2015. The song appeared on the soundtrack for the FIFA 16 video game. A music video for the song was directed by Christopher Ranson and released in October 2015. "Shine a Light" has peaked at number 71 on the Billboard Canada Hot 100 chart, at number five on the Canada Rock chart, and at number 43 on the Billboard Rock Airplay chart.

"Start a Riot" was released as the third single on 4 December 2015. The song has peaked at number 24 on the Billboard Hot Rock Songs chart, and at number 47 on the Canada Rock chart.

== Track listing ==
No.	Title	Writer(s)	Length
1.	"Start a Riot"	Todd Clark; Stephen Kozmeniuk; Michael Nelson	3:35
2.	"Shine a Light"	Kozmeniuk; Nelson	3:45
3.	"Gold Dust"	Kozmeniuk; Nelson	4:15
4.	"Ghosts"	Dan Armstrong; Nelson	4:10
5.	"Back When We Had Nothing"	Kozmeniuk; Nelson	3:43

== Charts ==
Chart (2016)	Peak position
Canadian Albums (Billboard)	67
