= Power Over Me =

Single by Dermot Kennedy

from the album Without Fear and Dermot Kennedy
- Released: 16 October 2018
- Length: 3:26
- Label: Riggins; Interscope; Island
- Songwriters: Dermot Kennedy; Scott Harris; Stephen Kozmeniuk
- Producer: Koz

Dermot Kennedy singles chronology
| "Young & Free" (2018) | "Power Over Me" (2018) | "For Island Fires and Family" (2019) |

"Power Over Me" is a song by Irish singer-songwriter and musician Dermot Kennedy. It was released as a single on 16 October 2018 as the second single from his debut studio album Without Fear. The song also features on his compilation album Dermot Kennedy. The song peaked at number 11 on the Irish Singles Chart.

== Music video ==
A music video to accompany the release of "Power Over Me" was first released onto YouTube on 13 November 2018.

== Track listing ==
Digital download
| No. | Title | Length |
|---|---|---|
| 1. | "Power Over Me" | 3:26 |
| 2. | "Power Over Me" (Acoustic) | 3:20 |
| 3. | "Power Over Me" (Ten Ven Remix) | 4:46 |

Digital download
| No. | Title | Length |
|---|---|---|
| 1. | "Power Over Me" | 3:26 |
| 2. | "Power Over Me" (Acoustic) | 3:20 |
| 3. | "Power Over Me" (Orchestral Version) | 3:37 |
| 4. | "Power Over Me" (Meduza Remix) | 2:58 |
| 5. | "Power Over Me" (Ten Ven Remix) | 4:46 |

== Personnel ==
Credits adapted from Tidal.

- Stephen Kozmeniuk – producer, composer, lyricist
- Dermot Kennedy – composer, lyricist
- Scott Harris – composer, lyricist
- Tony Maserati – mixer, studio personnel

== Charts ==
=== Weekly charts ===
| Chart (2018–2020) | Peak position |
|---|---|
| Austria (Ö3 Austria Top 40) | 34 |
| Belgium (Ultratop 50 Flanders) | 10 |
| Belgium (Ultratop 50 Wallonia) | 7 |
| Czech Republic Airplay (ČNS IFPI) | 1 |
| France (SNEP) | 73 |
| Germany (GfK) | 37 |
| Germany Airplay (BVMI) | 1 |
| Hungary (Editors' Choice Top 40) | 34 |
| Ireland (IRMA) | 11 |
| Netherlands (Dutch Top 40) | 11 |
| Netherlands (Single Top 100) | 35 |
| Poland Airplay (ZPAV) | 3 |
| Scotland Singles (Official Charts) | 3 |
| Slovakia Airplay (ČNS IFPI) | 1 |
| Sweden (Sverigetopplistan) | 56 |
| Switzerland (Schweizer Hitparade) | 29 |
| UK Singles (Official Charts) | 27 |
| US Hot Rock Songs (Billboard) | 21 |

=== Year-end charts ===
| Chart (2019) | Position |
|---|---|
| Belgium (Ultratop Flanders) | 25 |
| Belgium (Ultratop Wallonia) | 19 |
| France (SNEP) | 175 |
| Netherlands (Dutch Top 40) | 47 |
| Poland (ZPAV) | 69 |
| Switzerland (Schweizer Hitparade) | 64 |
| US Hot Rock Songs (Billboard) | 67 |

| Chart (2020) | Position |
|---|---|
| Ireland (IRMA) | 24 |

== Certifications ==
| Region | Certification | Certified units/sales |
|---|---|---|
| Austria (IFPI Austria) | Platinum | 30,000^{‡} |
| Belgium (BRMA) | Gold | 20,000^{‡} |
| Brazil (Pro-Música Brasil) | 2× Platinum | 80,000^{‡} |
| Canada (Music Canada) | 2× Platinum | 160,000^{‡} |
| Denmark (IFPI Danmark) | Platinum | 90,000^{‡} |
| France (SNEP) | Diamond | 333,333^{‡} |
| Germany (BVMI) | Gold | 200,000^{‡} |
| New Zealand (RMNZ) | Platinum | 30,000^{‡} |
| Poland (ZPAV) | Platinum | 50,000^{‡} |
| Portugal (AFP) | Platinum | 10,000^{‡} |
| Switzerland (IFPI Switzerland) | 2× Platinum | 40,000^{‡} |
| United Kingdom (BPI) | 2× Platinum | 1,200,000^{‡} |
| United States (RIAA) | Gold | 500,000^{‡} |
Streaming
| Sweden (GLF) | Gold | 4,000,000^{†} |
^{‡} Sales+streaming figures based on certification alone.^{†} Streaming-only figures based on certification alone.

== Release history ==
| Region | Date | Format | Label |
|---|---|---|---|
| Ireland | 16 October 2018 | Digital download | Riggins; Interscope; Island |
