= Better Days (Dermot Kennedy song) =

2021 single by Dermot Kennedy

Single by Dermot Kennedy

from the album Sonder
- Released: 28 July 2021
- Length: 3:18
- Label: Island
- Songwriters: Daniel Nigro; Carey Willetts; Dermot Kennedy; Sam Roman; Scott Harris
- Producers: Daniel Nigro; Ryan Linvill

Dermot Kennedy singles chronology
"Don't Cry" (2020)	"Better Days" (2021)	"Something to Someone" (2022)

Music video
- "Better Days" on YouTube

"Better Days" is a song by Irish singer-songwriter Dermot Kennedy. It was released on 28 July 2021 via Island Records. Kennedy wrote the song with Daniel Nigro, Carey Willetts, Sam Roman and Scott Harris, and it was produced by Nigro and Ryan Linvill.

== Background ==
In an interview with Songwriter Universe, Kennedy stated he wrote the song in February 2021 during the COVID-19 pandemic. In September, during his tour of America, he told American Songwriter: "The way I saw it, that was almost the voice of my mother and father telling me to hold out and to know that my music would work out someday. Anytime I felt disheartened, felt down, like it wasn't going to work out—that's where this song sits for me".

== Content ==
In a press release, Kennedy explained: "This is a song about patience. It's about believing in something brighter, and never losing sight of better days, no matter how hard things might get. In a time where so many people feel worried and exhausted, I would love for this song to remind even one person that things will improve. As an artist, I feel somewhat responsible to try to make people feel a little better, whether that’s making them think of someone they love, or just taking their mind off their problems for the length of a song. So this is my contribution to hopefully providing some people with a moment's solace. Better days will come". The song "come[s] with the kind of optimism and hopes Dermot has been so vocal about throughout his career, providing support and solace to so many".

== Critical reception ==
Nora Onanian of WERS wrote that the song "feels like being lifted out of fog. [And] also gives a taste of a new direction Kennedy seems to be going in musically". Ed Power of The Irish Times commented that it "skilfully binds together elements of every popular Irish artist of the past 25 years", like The Script, and "in the choral backing sung in Irish, of The Cranberries at their most ethereal".

== Music video ==
The music video was directed by Paul Gore. It showcases Kennedy "fighting a powerful jet stream underwater, push[ing] forward in scenes filled with tension, energy and movement", with him eventually "prevailing in his physical struggle".

== Credits and personnel ==
Credits adapted from AllMusic.

- Clarence Coffee Jr. – vocal producer
- Curtis Elvidge – vocal producer
- Neil Goody – vocal producer
- Matty Green – engineer, mixing
- Laurence Guy – primary artist
- Scott Harris – composer
- Dermot Kennedy – composer, primary artist, vocals
- Ryan Linvill – drum programming, producer, recording, saxophone, synthesizer programming
- Mitch McCarthy – mixing
- Randy Merrill – mastering engineer
- Daniel Nigro – bass, composer, drum programming, keyboards, piano, producer, vocals (background)
- Chappell Roan – vocals (background)
- Sam Romans – composer
- Carey Willetts – composer, vocal engineer

== Charts ==
=== Weekly charts ===
2021–2022 weekly chart performance for "Better Days"
Chart (2021–2022)	Peak position
Belgium (Ultratop 50 Flanders)	30
Czech Republic Airplay (ČNS IFPI)	4
Ireland (IRMA)	4
Netherlands (Dutch Top 40)	21
Netherlands (Single Top 100)	42
New Zealand Hot Singles (RMNZ)	20
Slovakia Airplay (ČNS IFPI)	15
UK Singles (Official Charts)	16

2026 weekly chart performance for "Better Days"
Chart (2026)	Peak position
Russia Streaming (TopHit)	100

=== Year-end charts ===
2021 year-end chart performance for "Better Days"
Chart (2021)	Position
Ireland (IRMA)	33

2022 year-end chart performance for "Better Days"
Chart (2022)	Position
Belgium (Ultratop 50 Flanders)	171

== Certifications ==
Certifications for "Better Days"
Region	Certification	Certified units/sales
Australia (ARIA)	Platinum	70,000^{‡}
Austria (IFPI Austria)	Gold	15,000^{‡}
Canada (Music Canada)	Platinum	80,000^{‡}
New Zealand (RMNZ)	Gold	15,000^{‡}
United Kingdom (BPI)	Platinum	600,000^{‡}
United States (RIAA)	Gold	500,000^{‡}
^{‡} Sales+streaming figures based on certification alone.
