= Banners (musician) =

English musician

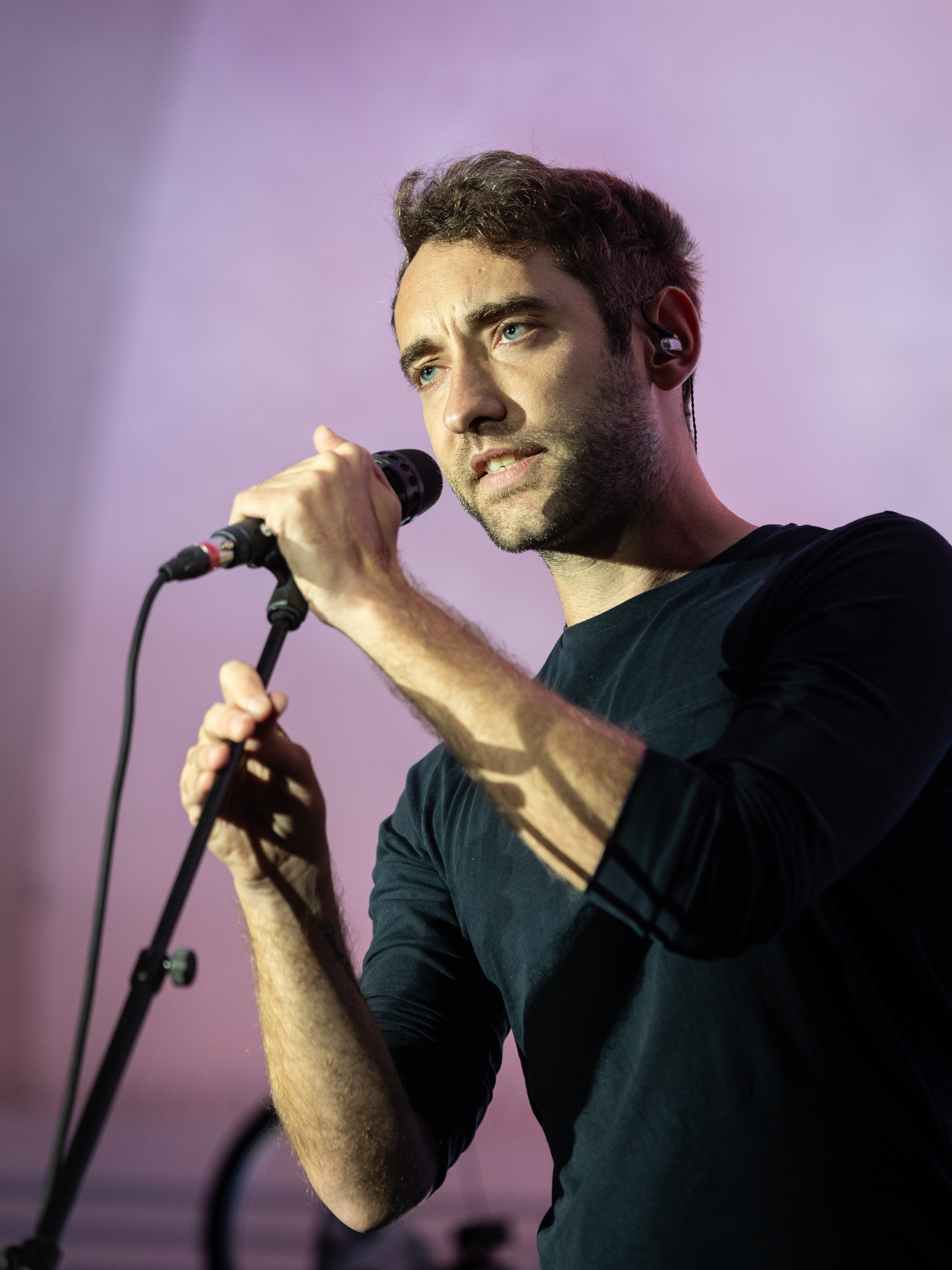
- Banners at the SWR3 New Pop Festival 2022

Background information
- Also known as: Raines
- Born: Michael Joseph Nelson
- Origin: Liverpool, United Kingdom
- Genres: Alternative rock; indie rock
- Occupations: Singer-songwriter; musician
- Instruments: Vocals; piano; guitar
- Years active: 2015–present
- Labels: Island; HOME; Universal
- Website: www.itsbanners.com

Michael Joseph Nelson, known under the stage name Banners (sometimes stylized as BANNΞRS), is an English musician from Liverpool. He released his debut studio album Where the Shadow Ends in 2019.

== History ==
=== 2015–2018: Early EPs ===
Nelson grew up singing in Liverpool Cathedral Choir and performed with the choir in various locations throughout Europe before deciding to start a solo career. In 2015, he relocated to Toronto, Ontario, Canada, from his native Liverpool, and contacted Canadian producer Stephen Kozmeniuk to work on his sound. Nelson released his debut single "Ghosts" in March 2015 under the stage name Raines. A music video for the song was directed by Christopher Ranson.

His second single, "Shine a Light", was released in August 2015 under the new moniker Banners. A music video for the song was directed by Christopher Ranson and released in October 2015. "Shine a Light" peaked at number 5 on the Billboard Canada Rock chart, and number 71 on the Canadian Hot 100.

In December 2015, Spotify included Banners on its Spotlight list, which highlights 15 artists to watch in 2016. On 4 December, Banners released his third single "Start a Riot". The song peaked at number 24 on the Billboard Hot Rock & Alternative Songs chart.

Banners signed with Island Records in 2016. His debut self-titled EP, produced by Kozmeniuk, was released on 15 January 2016 through Island Records. In addition to the three previously released singles, it included two new tracks: "Gold Dust" and "Back When We Had Nothing". The EP debuted at number 67 on the Billboard Canadian Albums Chart. On 22 January 2016, Capitol Records released a soundtrack album for the TV series The Royals, which included Banners' song "Half Light". On 27 January 2016, Banners made his television debut performing "Shine a Light" on ABC's show Jimmy Kimmel Live!. From 29 February to 31 March 2016, he joined American bands POP ETC and The Moth & The Flame for his first U.S. tour.

On 3 June 2016, Banners released the single "Half Light".

On 24 July 2016, Banners performed at WayHome Music & Arts Festival. On 31 July 2016, he performed at Lollapalooza in Chicago.

On 16 September 2016, Banners released "Into the Storm" which peaked at number 16 on the Canada Rock chart. This was followed in November 2016 by "Holy Ground". The song's music video stars Ashley Greene.

On 31 May 2017, Banners began touring with band Milky Chance in the US. On 3 November 2017, Banners released his second EP, Empires on Fire.

=== 2019–present: Where the Shadow Ends ===
On 4 October 2019, Banners released his debut album, Where the Shadow Ends, preceded by the singles "Got It In You" and "Where the Shadow Ends" The album was supported with a five-week headline tour across North America.

In 2020, his 2017 single "Someone to You" received a resurgence in streaming following a TikTok trend. The single was certified Gold in Australia by the Australian Recording Industry Association.

On 1 May 2020, Banners released his third EP, Always Yours, on Island Records, with acoustic versions of previously released tracks, along with the new title track.

In January 2023 he released the EP I Wish I Was Flawless, I'm Not on Nettwerk. The EP was a Juno Award nominee for Adult Contemporary Album of the Year at the Juno Awards of 2024.

== In popular culture ==
His song "Ghosts" was featured on season 5 episodes of both Suits and Teen Wolf. On 29 May 2017, the single "Start a Riot" was featured on the last episode of the second season of the TV series Lucifer. It is also featured in the season 3 Episode 8 of the Netflix series Ginny & Georgia.

The single "Shine a Light" was featured on the 7th episode of the first season of the TV series The Good Doctor, on the video game FIFA 16, the soundtrack of the 2017 movie The Space Between Us, and the 2018 film Beautiful Boy. The single was also featured near the end of the 2018 movie Love, Simon but was not included in the soundtrack of the same name.

In April 2018, Banners appeared on season 16 of the U.S. TV competition American Idol to perform two duets with contestants Ron Bultongez and Alyssa Raghu. He sang his own "Someone to You" with Bultongez and Coldplay's "Yellow" with Raghu.

In 2018 the single "Half Light" was featured in the trailer of the TV series New Amsterdam, and on an episode of the TV series The Royals.

In 2019, the single "Got It in You" was featured in the 17th episode of the second season of the US TV series The Good Doctor and in an episode of America's Got Talent. "Someone to You" is used in the 2019 movie After, in the trailer of the TV series Love, Victor, in a 2017 episode of Kevin (Probably) Saves the World, and in a commercial for T-Mobile. It was also used in late 2020, season 17 of Grey's Anatomy, for the return of Derek Shepherd.

In 2021, the single "If I Didn't Have You" was used in the trailer of the second season of the show Love, Victor, making it the second time a Banners song was used for the show.

In 2022, "Someone to You" was used as the theme song for the Netflix series Love is Blind: Japan. The song was used in the opening credits as well as an instrumental version during the 8th episode. It additionally soundtracked the main trailer for the Apple TV+ animated film Luck.

== Discography ==
=== Studio albums ===
Title	Album details
Where the Shadow Ends	Released: 4 October 2019; Label: HOME, Island; Format: CD, digital download
All Back to Mine	Released: 19 April 2024; Label: Nettwerk; Format: CD, digital download

=== Extended plays ===
Title	EP details	Peak chart positions
Title	EP details	CAN
Banners	Released: 15 January 2016; Label: Island; Format: Digital download	67
Empires on Fire	Released: 3 November 2017; Label: Island; Format: Digital download	—
Always Yours	Released: 1 May 2020; Label: Island, Universal; Format: Digital download, streaming	—
Somebody to Someone	Released: 3 August 2020; Label: FP, Universal; Format: Digital download, streaming	—
The Rise, The Fall	Released: 5 August 2020; Label: FP, Universal; Format: Digital download, streaming	—
Starlight in the Room	Released: 7 August 2020; Label: FP, Universal; Format: Digital download, streaming	—
It's Gonna Be OK	Released: 24 September 2021; Label: Island, Universal; Format: Digital download, streaming	—
I Wish I Was Flawless, I'm Not	Released: 13 January 2023; Label: Nettwerk; Format: Digital download, streaming	—
"—" denotes a recording that did not chart or was not released in that territory.

=== Singles ===
Title	Year	Peak chart positions										Certifications	Album
Title	Year	UK	AUS	BEL (FL)	BEL (WA)	CAN	GER	IRE	NLD	US Bub.	US Rock	Certifications	Album
"Ghosts" (as Raines)	2015	—	—	—	—	—	—	—	—	—	—		Banners
"Shine a Light"	2015	—	—	—	—	71	—	—	—	—	—	MC: Gold	Banners
"Start a Riot"	2015	—	—	—	—	32	—	—	—	—	24	MC: Gold	Banners
"Half Light"	2016	—	—	—	—	—	—	—	—	—	—		Non-album single
"Into the Storm"	2016	—	—	—	—	16	—	—	—	—	—		Empires on Fire
"Holy Ground"	2016	—	—	—	—	—	—	—	—	—	—		Empires on Fire
"Someone to You"	2017	60	97	8	11	60	100	41	16	18	11	BPI: Platinum; ARIA: Platinum; BEA: Platinum; BVMI: Gold; MC: Platinum; NVPI: Platinum; RIAA: 2× Platinum	Empires on Fire
"FireFly"	2017	—	—	—	—	—	—	—	—	—	—		Empires on Fire
"Let Go"	2018	—	—	—	—	—	—	—	—	—	—		Non-album single
"Got It in You"	2019	—	—	—	—	—	—	—	—	—	—		Where the Shadow Ends
"Where the Shadow Ends" (with Young Bombs)	2019	—	—	—	—	—	—	—	—	—	—		Where the Shadow Ends
"Always Yours"	2020	—	—	—	—	—	—	—	—	—	—		Always Yours
"Have Yourself a Merry Little Christmas" / "Fairytale of New York"	2020	—	—	—	—	—	—	—	—	—	—		Non album single
"If I Didn't Have You"	2021	—	—	—	—	—	—	—	—	—	—		It's Gonna Be OK
"Serenade"	2021	—	—	—	—	—	—	—	—	—	—		It's Gonna Be OK
"Happy Xmas (War Is Over)" / "2000 Miles"	2021	—	—	—	—	—	—	—	—	—	—		Non-album single
"Keeps Me Going"	2022	—	—	—	—	—	—	—	—	—	—		I Wish I Was Flawless, I'm Not
"Happier"	2022	—	—	—	—	—	—	—	—	—	—		I Wish I Was Flawless, I'm Not
"Perfectly Broken"	2022	—	—	—	—	—	—	—	—	—	—		I Wish I Was Flawless, I'm Not
"Easy"	2022	—	—	—	—	—	—	—	—	—	—		I Wish I Was Flawless, I'm Not
"In Your Universe"	2023	—	—	—	—	—	—	—	—	—	—		All Back to Mine
"Tell You I Love You"	2023	—	—	—	—	—	—	—	—	—	—		All Back to Mine
"Name in Lights"	2023	—	—	—	—	—	—	—	—	—	—		All Back to Mine
"Have You Ever Loved Someone"	2023	—	—	—	—	—	—	—	—	—	—		All Back to Mine
"C'est la Vie"	2023	—	—	—	—	—	—	—	—	—	—		All Back to Mine
"Broken Hearted"	2023	—	—	—	—	—	—	—	—	—	—		All Back to Mine
"Anywhere for You"	2023	—	—	—	—	—	—	—	—	—	—		All Back to Mine
"The Best View in Liverpool"	2023	—	—	—	—	—	—	—	—	—	—		All Back to Mine
"Hurts When It's Healing"	2024	—	—	—	—	—	—	—	—	—	—		All Back to Mine (Deluxe)
"Fall on Me"	2025	—	—	—	—	—	—	—	—	—	—		All Back to Mine (Deluxe)
"—" denotes a recording that did not chart or was not released in that territory.

=== Other songs ===
Title	Year	Album
"Hurts Like This" (with Illenium)	2021	Fallen Embers (Deluxe)
