= Kiss Me (Dermot Kennedy song) =

2022 single by Dermot Kennedy

Single by Dermot Kennedy

from the album Sonder
- Released: 2 September 2022
- Length: 3:49
- Label: Island
- Songwriters: Daniel Nigro; Dermot Kennedy; Dan Smith; Stephen Kozmeniuk; Steve McCutcheon
- Producers: Scott Harris; Stephen Kozmeniuk; Steve McCutcheon

Dermot Kennedy singles chronology
"Dreamer" (2022)	"Kiss Me" (2022)	"Innocence and Sadness" (2022)

Music video
- "Kiss Me" on YouTube

"Kiss Me" is a song by Irish singer-songwriter Dermot Kennedy. It was released on 2 September 2022 as the fourth single from his second studio album, Sonder.

Upon release, Kennedy said, "The message behind both the video and song of 'Kiss Me' is that love is worth it…Even when things are falling apart and life feels short and there's chaos all around us, there's still always something to hold on to."

== Track listings ==
1-track

1. "Kiss Me" - 3:49

remixes

1. "Kiss Me" - 3:49
2. "Kiss Me" (acoustic - Live from Boston, 2022) - 3:45
3. "Kiss Me" (guitar) - 3:38
4. "Kiss Me" (Paul Woolford remix) - 4:04

piano

1. "Kiss Me" (piano) - 3:38
2. "Kiss Me" - 3:49

strings

1. "Kiss Me" (strings) - 3:40
2. "Kiss Me" - 3:49

== Charts ==
Weekly chart performance for "Kiss Me"
Chart (2022–2023)	Peak position
Austria (Ö3 Austria Top 40)	35
Belgium (Ultratop 50 Wallonia)	15
Czech Republic Airplay (ČNS IFPI)	3
France (SNEP)	103
Ireland (IRMA)	4
Germany (GfK)	46
New Zealand Hot Singles (RMNZ)	15
Switzerland (Schweizer Hitparade)	15
UK Singles (OCC)	15

== Certifications ==
Certifications for "Kiss Me"
Region	Certification	Certified units/sales
United Kingdom (BPI)	Platinum	600,000^{‡}
^{‡} Sales+streaming figures based on certification alone.
