= Dermot Kennedy (album) =

Compilation album by Dermot Kennedy
- Released: 4 January 2019
- Labels: Riggins; Interscope; Island
- Producers: Koz; Carey Willetts; H. Amarr

Dermot Kennedy chronology
Mike Dean Presents: Dermot Kennedy (2018)	Dermot Kennedy (2019)	Without Fear (2019)

Singles from Dermot Kennedy
- 1. "Power Over Me" Released: 16 October 2018; 2. "For Island Fires and Family" Released: 4 January 2019

Dermot Kennedy is the debut compilation album by the Irish singer-songwriter and musician Dermot Kennedy. It was released on 4 January 2019. The album peaked at number 4 on the Irish Albums Chart.

== Commercial performance ==
On 11 January 2019, the album entered the Irish Albums Chart at number 8. On 11 October 2019, the album reached a new peak of number 4, his debut studio album Without Fear entered at number one the same day.

== Track listing ==
No.	Title	Writer(s)	Producer(s)	Length
1.	"Power Over Me"	Dermot Kennedy; Scott Harris; Stephen Kozmeniuk	Koz	3:26
2.	"Moments Passed"	Kennedy; Micheál Quinn; Kozmeniuk; Carey Willetts	Willetts	4:31
3.	"Glory"	Kennedy; Kozmeniuk	Koz; Willetts	3:42
4.	"An Evening I Will Not Forget" (Acoustic)	Kennedy	Michael Hefferman	4:10
5.	"For Island Fires and Family"	Kennedy	Willetts, H. Amarr	4:45
6.	"Young & Free"	Kennedy; Kozmeniuk	Koz; Willetts	4:26
7.	"All My Friends"	Kennedy; Charlie Hugall	Koz; Willetts; Hugall	4:17
8.	"Boston"	Kennedy; Willetts	Willetts	4:33
9.	"A Closeness"	Kennedy; Willetts	Willetts	4:11
10.	"Couldn't Tell"	Kennedy; Ian Barter	Koz; Barter	4:16
11.	"After Rain"	Kennedy; Lia Wright; Quinn	Hafferman	4:54
12.	"Shelter"	Kennedy	Hafferman	4:30

== Charts ==
=== Weekly charts ===
Chart (2019)	Peak position
Irish Albums (IRMA)	4
UK Albums (Official Charts)	76

=== Year-end charts ===
Chart (2019)	Position
Irish Albums (IRMA)	11
Chart (2020)	Position
Irish Albums (IRMA)	11
Chart (2021)	Position
Irish Albums (IRMA)	27

== Certifications ==
Certifications and sales for Dermot Kennedy
Region	Certification	Certified units/sales
United Kingdom (BPI)	Gold	100,000^{‡}
^{‡} Sales+streaming figures based on certification alone.

== Release history ==
Region	Date	Format	Label
Ireland	4 January 2019	Digital download	Riggins; Interscope; Island
