= Giants (Dermot Kennedy song) =

2020 single by Dermot Kennedy

Single by Dermot Kennedy

from the album Without Fear
- Released: 24 June 2020
- Genre: Indie pop
- Length: 2:57
- Label: Riggins; Interscope; Island
- Songwriter(s): Stephen Kozmeniuk; Scott Harris; Dermot Kennedy
- Producer(s): Stephen Kozmeniuk

Dermot Kennedy singles chronology
"Resolution" (2020)	"Giants" (2020)	"Paradise" (2020)

Music video
- "Giants" on YouTube

"Giants" is a song by Irish singer-songwriter and musician Dermot Kennedy. It was released as a digital download on 24 June 2020 by Riggins, Interscope and Island. The track peaked at Number 12 in the UK Chart and was the lead single from Dermot Kennedy's Number 1 Album (UK, Scottish and Irish Charts) 'Without Fear' and his only single on vinyl - released on a blue 7" in 2020. The song peaked at number one on the Irish Singles Chart. The song was written by Stephen Kozmeniuk, Scott Harris and Dermot Kennedy.

== Background ==
In an interview with George Godfrey on Radio X, Kennedy said, "This is a song that I've had on me for a little while, but just the way things currently are things that have taken place in the world, it feels like there’s a massive shift taking place everywhere in the world so its meaning kind of grew and are and grew for me. And certainly now it feels like it’s a delicate time to release music right? You don't want to bring out something insipid and seem kind of tone deaf. You don't want people to think you're not thinking about things and so the meaning of the song […] It's ultimately just about being comfortable with letting go of the past and moving on and being comfortable with change and moving forward in that sense…"

== Personnel ==
Credits adapted from Tidal.

- Stephen Kozmeniuk – producer, composer, lyricist, associated performer, bass, drums, guitar, keyboards
- Dermot Kennedy – composer, lyricist, associated performer, background vocalist, vocalist
- Scott Harris – composer, lyricist
- Ben Jones – associated performer, guitar
- Dave Cohen – associated performer, organ, piano
- Todd Clark – associated performer, background vocalist
- Matty Green – mixer, studio personnel
- Matt Snell – recording engineer, studio personnel

== Charts ==
=== Weekly charts ===
Chart (2020–2021)	Peak position
Austria (Ö3 Austria Top 40)	37
Belgium (Ultratop 50 Flanders)	27
Belgium (Ultratip Bubbling Under Wallonia)	15
Czech Republic (Rádio – Top 100)	27
Germany (GfK)	45
Hungary (Rádiós Top 40)	39
Iceland (Tónlistinn)	22
Ireland (IRMA)	1
New Zealand Hot Singles (RMNZ)	25
Scotland (OCC)	23
Slovakia (Rádio Top 100)	6
Slovenia (SloTop50)	34
Sweden (Sverigetopplistan)	59
Switzerland (Schweizer Hitparade)	23
UK Singles (OCC)	12
US Hot Rock & Alternative Songs (Billboard)	26

=== Year-end charts ===
Chart (2020)	Position
Belgium (Ultratop Flanders)	98
Ireland (IRMA)	8

Chart (2021)	Position
Ireland (IRMA)	11

== Certifications ==
Region	Certification	Certified units/sales
Australia (ARIA)	Gold	35,000^{‡}
Austria (IFPI Austria)	Platinum	30,000^{‡}
Canada (Music Canada)	Gold	40,000^{‡}
Germany (BVMI)	Gold	200,000^{‡}
New Zealand (RMNZ)	Gold	15,000^{‡}
Switzerland (IFPI Switzerland)	Platinum	20,000^{‡}
United Kingdom (BPI)	Platinum	600,000^{‡}
Streaming
Sweden (GLF)	Gold	4,000,000^{†}
^{‡} Sales+streaming figures based on certification alone.^{†} Streaming-only figures based on certification alone.

== Release history ==
Region	Date	Format	Label
Ireland	24 June 2020	Digital download; streaming	Riggins; Interscope; Island
