= For Island Fires and Family =

Single by Dermot Kennedy

from the album Dermot Kennedy
- Released: 4 January 2019
- Length: 4:45
- Label: Riggins; Interscope; Island
- Songwriter: Dermot Kennedy

Dermot Kennedy singles chronology
"Power Over Me" (2018)	"For Island Fires and Family" (2019)	"Lost" (2019)

"For Island Fires and Family" is a song by Irish singer-songwriter and musician Dermot Kennedy. It was released as a single on 4 January 2019. The song features on his compilation album Dermot Kennedy. The song peaked at number 36 on the Irish Singles Chart.

== Background ==
The song has been a fan favourite. Kennedy tweeted, "I wanted to start the new year by bringing together all the songs you've been singing back to me in one collection. As well as that, right now I want to share 'For Island Fires and Family' with you. This song is hugely important to me, and I've been so excited to release it."

Kennedy disclosed in an interview the meaning of the popular lyric, “Now when I’m face to face with death I’ll grab his throat and ask him, ‘How does it hurt?’.” He states that loss is inevitable. No matter the circumstance and no matter the quality of life that is lived, nothing gets by death. In this song, Kennedy wanted to take control of that notion, and in reverse, take control of death.

== Music video ==
A music video to accompany the release of "For Island Fires and Family" was first released onto YouTube on 10 January 2019.

== Personnel ==
Credits adapted from Tidal.

- Carey Willetts – producer, associated performer, bass, drum programming, engineer, mixer, piano, studio personnel, synthesizer
- Dermot Kennedy – composer, lyricist, acoustic guitar, associated performer
- Amy Jane Hosken – associated performer, viola, violin
- H. Amarr - composer, lyricist
- Chris Gehringer – mastering engineer, studio personnel

== Charts ==
Chart performance for "For Island Fires and Family"
Chart (2019)	Peak position
Ireland (IRMA)	36

== Release history ==
Release history for "For Island Fires and Family"
Region	Date	Format	Label
Ireland	4 January 2019	Digital download; streaming	Riggins; Interscope; Island
