= Outnumbered (song) =

Single by Dermot Kennedy

from the album Without Fear
- Released: 14 June 2019
- Genre: Folk-pop
- Length: 4:05
- Label: Riggins; Interscope; Island
- Songwriters: Dermot Kennedy; Jay Mooncie; Scott Harris; Stephen Kozmeniuk
- Producer: Koz

Dermot Kennedy singles chronology
"Lost" (2019)	"Outnumbered" (2019)	"Resolution" (2020)

Music video
- "Outnumbered" on YouTube

"Outnumbered" is a song by Irish singer Dermot Kennedy from his debut studio album Without Fear, serving as the album's ninth track. The song was written by Kennedy alongside Jay Mooncie, Scott Harris and the song's producer Stephen Kozmeniuk. Riggins Recording, Interscope Records and Island Records released the song as the lead single from Without Fear on 14 June 2019.

== Background ==
Kennedy announced the single via his social media the day before its release. When asked about the song, Kennedy said "'Outnumbered' is an attempt to comfort anybody who is feeling overwhelmed. A reminder that beauty can be found no matter how dark the night may seem. I hope it can be a source of reassurance to anyone going through hard times. To know that things will get better and that hard times will become a thing of the past."

== Composition ==
Musically, the song is a folk-pop song with R&B influences. Lyrically the song is about comforting someone who is feeling overwhelmed.

== Music video ==
The song's music video was released 8 July 2019 via YouTube Artist on the Rise. It was directed by Luke Monaghan and filmed in Wicklow, Ireland area and at the Carlisle Grounds. When asked about the music video, Kennedy said "With this video what I wanted to show was a lot of different people in different situations, all reaching some level of comfort within their struggle. That despite whatever hardship they're enduring, they feel some solace knowing that it will pass and that through love and support from the people closest to them, good times will find them again."

== Live performances ==
Kennedy performed the song at the Glastonbury Festival 2019. He also performed it at YouTube Space NYC in August 2019.

== Track listing ==
Digital download
No.	Title	Length
1.	"Outnumbered"	4:05

Digital download – Acoustic
No.	Title	Length
1.	"Outnumbered" (acoustic)	3:54

Digital EP – Remixes
No.	Title	Length
1.	"Outnumbered" (MJ Cole remix)	4:38
2.	"Outnumbered" (aboutagirl remix)	3:01

== Personnel ==
Credits adapted from Tidal.

- Stephen Kozmeniuk – production, songwriting, bass guitar, drums, guitar, synthesizer
- Dermot Kennedy – songwriting, guitar, organ, vocals
- Jay Mooncie – songwriting
- Scott Harris – songwriting, guitar
- Todd Clark – background vocals
- Matt Snell – engineering

== Charts ==
=== Weekly charts ===
Chart (2019–2020)	Peak position
Austria (Ö3 Austria Top 40)	33
Belgium (Ultratop 50 Flanders)	7
Belgium (Ultratip Bubbling Under Wallonia)	11
Czech Republic Airplay (ČNS IFPI)	9
Germany (GfK)	45
Ireland (IRMA)	2
Lithuania (AGATA)	89
New Zealand Hot Singles (RMNZ)	32
Scottish Singles Sales (Official Charts)	3
Slovenia (SloTop50)	11
Switzerland (Schweizer Hitparade)	20
UK Singles (Official Charts)	6
US Adult Top 40 (Billboard)	21
US Hot Rock & Alternative Songs (Billboard)	8

=== Year-end charts ===
Chart (2019)	Position
Belgium (Ultratop Flanders)	74
Ireland (IRMA)	5
UK Singles (OCC)	69
US Hot Rock & Alternative Songs (Billboard)	65

Chart (2020)	Position
Ireland (IRMA)	13
UK Singles (OCC)	94
US Hot Rock & Alternative Songs (Billboard)	71

Chart (2021)	Position
Ireland (IRMA)	47

== Certifications ==
Region	Certification	Certified units/sales
Australia (ARIA)	2× Platinum	140,000^{‡}
Austria (IFPI Austria)	Platinum	30,000^{‡}
Brazil (Pro-Música Brasil)	Gold	20,000^{‡}
Canada (Music Canada)	2× Platinum	160,000^{‡}
Denmark (IFPI Danmark)	Platinum	90,000^{‡}
Germany (BVMI)	Gold	200,000^{‡}
New Zealand (RMNZ)	Platinum	30,000^{‡}
Switzerland (IFPI Switzerland)	Platinum	20,000^{‡}
United Kingdom (BPI)	2× Platinum	1,200,000^{‡}
United States (RIAA)	Gold	500,000^{‡}
^{‡} Sales+streaming figures based on certification alone.

== Release history ==
Region	Date	Format	Version	Label	Ref.
Various	14 June 2019	Digital download; streaming	Original	Riggins; Interscope; Island	
Italy	28 June 2019	Contemporary hit radio	Original	Universal	
United Kingdom	26 July 2019	Contemporary hit radio	Original	Riggins; Interscope; Island	
Various	16 August 2019	Digital download; streaming	Acoustic	Riggins; Interscope; Island	
Various	30 August 2019	Digital download; streaming	Remixes	Riggins; Interscope; Island	
Australia	25 October 2019	Contemporary hit radio	Original	Universal	
