= Paradise (Meduza song) =

2020 song by Meduza featuring Dermot Kennedy

Single by Meduza featuring Dermot Kennedy

from the EP Introducing Meduza
- Released: 30 October 2020
- Genre: Deep house
- Length: 2:48
- Label: Island; The Cross
- Songwriters: Luca De Gregorio; Mattia Vitale; Simone Giani; Joshua Grimmett; Connor Manning; Dan Caplen; Wayne Hector; Gerard "Gez" O'Connell; Dermot Kennedy
- Producer: Meduza

Meduza singles chronology
"Born to Love" (2020)	"Paradise" (2020)	"Headrush" (2021)

Dermot Kennedy singles chronology
"Giants" (2020)	"Paradise" (2020)	"Power" (2020)

"Paradise" is a song by Italian production trio Meduza, featuring vocals from Irish singer-songwriter and musician Dermot Kennedy. It was released on 30 October 2020 by Island. The song was written by Conor Manning, Dan Caplen, Dermot Kennedy, Gez O'Connell, Joshua Grimmett, Luca De Gregorio, Mattia Vitale, Simone Giani and Wayne Hector.

== Music video ==
A music video for the song was directed by Jess Kohl and shot in Craco, a ghost town in the Italian region of Basilicata. Later another music video with Meduza and Kennedy performing live was released; the filming took place in Milan and New York.

== Personnel ==
Credits adapted from Tidal.

- Luca De Gregorio – producer, composer, lyricist, additional keyboards, associated performer, drums, mastering engineer, mixer, programming, studio personnel
- Mattia Vitale – producer, composer, lyricist, additional keyboards, associated performer, drums, programming
- Simone Giani – producer, composer, lyricist, additional keyboards, associated performer, drums, programming
- Conor Manning – composer, lyricist
- Dan Caplen – composer, lyricist
- Dermot Kennedy – composer, lyricist, associated performer, featured artist, vocals
- Gez O'Connell – composer, lyricist
- Joshua Grimmett – composer, lyricist
- Wayne Hector – composer, lyricist
- Koz – studio personnel, vocal engineer

== Charts ==
=== Weekly charts ===
Weekly chart performance for "Paradise"
Chart (2020–2021)	Peak position
Australia (ARIA)	19
Austria (Ö3 Austria Top 40)	15
Belgium (Ultratop 50 Flanders)	8
Belgium (Ultratop 50 Wallonia)	13
Canada Hot 100 (Billboard)	50
Czech Republic Airplay (ČNS IFPI)	2
Czech Republic Singles Digital (ČNS IFPI)	8
Denmark (Tracklisten)	17
France (SNEP)	176
Germany (GfK)	14
Germany Airplay (BVMI)	1
Greece (IFPI)	34
Global 200 (Billboard)	30
Hungary (Dance Top 40)	6
Hungary (Rádiós Top 40)	1
Hungary (Single Top 40)	6
Hungary (Stream Top 40)	4
Iceland (Tónlistinn)	30
Ireland (IRMA)	1
Italy (FIMI)	19
Lithuania (AGATA)	6
Netherlands (Dutch Top 40)	4
Netherlands (Single Top 100)	9
New Zealand Hot Singles (RMNZ)	10
Poland (Polish Airplay Top 100)	3
Portugal (AFP)	21
Romania (Airplay 100)	7
San Marino Airplay (SMRRTV Top 50)	4
Scotland Singles (OCC)	26
Slovakia Airplay (ČNS IFPI)	4
Slovakia Singles Digital (ČNS IFPI)	3
Slovenia Airplay (SloTop50)	22
Sweden (Sverigetopplistan)	61
Switzerland (Schweizer Hitparade)	14
UK Singles (OCC)	5
UK Dance (OCC)	2
US Hot Dance/Electronic Songs (Billboard)	6

=== Year-end charts ===
2020 year-end chart performance for "Paradise"
Chart (2020)	Position
Hungary (Single Top 40)	64
Hungary (Stream Top 40)	89

2021 year-end chart performance for "Paradise"
Chart (2021)	Position
Australia (ARIA)	48
Austria (Ö3 Austria Top 40)	50
Belgium (Ultratop Flanders)	17
Belgium (Ultratop Wallonia)	43
Canada (Canadian Hot 100)	96
CIS (TopHit)	13
Denmark (Tracklisten)	44
Germany (Official German Charts)	35
Global 200 (Billboard)	104
Hungary (Dance Top 40)	24
Hungary (Rádiós Top 40)	5
Hungary (Single Top 40)	67
Hungary (Stream Top 40)	22
Ireland (IRMA)	14
Italy (FIMI)	93
Netherlands (Dutch Top 40)	39
Netherlands (Single Top 100)	49
Poland (ZPAV)	42
Portugal (AFP)	51
Russia Airplay (TopHit)	32
Switzerland (Schweizer Hitparade)	38
UK Singles (OCC)	36
US Hot Dance/Electronic Songs (Billboard)	11

2022 year-end chart performance for "Paradise"
Chart (2022)	Position
Hungary (Dance Top 40)	75

2025 year-end chart performance for "Paradise"
Chart (2025)	Position
Belarus Airplay (TopHit)	179

== Certifications ==
Certifications for "Paradise"
Region	Certification	Certified units/sales
Australia (ARIA)	Platinum	70,000^{‡}
Austria (IFPI Austria)	Platinum	30,000^{‡}
Belgium (BRMA)	Gold	20,000^{‡}
Brazil (Pro-Música Brasil)	2× Diamond	320,000^{‡}
Canada (Music Canada)	3× Platinum	240,000^{‡}
Denmark (IFPI Danmark)	Platinum	90,000^{‡}
France (SNEP)	Gold	100,000^{‡}
Germany (BVMI)	Platinum	400,000^{‡}
Italy (FIMI)	Platinum	70,000^{‡}
New Zealand (RMNZ)	2× Platinum	60,000^{‡}
Poland (ZPAV)	2× Platinum	100,000^{‡}
Portugal (AFP)	Platinum	10,000^{‡}
Spain (PROMUSICAE)	Platinum	60,000^{‡}
United Kingdom (BPI)	Platinum	600,000^{‡}
United States (RIAA)	Platinum	1,000,000^{‡}
Streaming
Greece (IFPI Greece)	Gold	1,000,000^{†}
Sweden (GLF)	Platinum	8,000,000^{†}
^{‡} Sales+streaming figures based on certification alone.^{†} Streaming-only figures based on certification alone.

== Release history ==
Region	Date	Format	Version	Label	Ref.
Various	30 October 2020	Digital download; streaming	Original	Island; The Cross	
Italy	30 October 2020	Contemporary hit radio	Original	Universal	
United Kingdom	6 November 2020	Contemporary hit radio	Original	Island; The Cross	
United Kingdom	21 November 2020	Adult contemporary radio	Original	Island; The Cross	
Various	27 November 2020	Digital download; streaming	Remixes	Island; The Cross	
Various	8 January 2021	Digital download; streaming	Acoustic	Island; The Cross	
Various	22 January 2021	Digital download; streaming	Vintage Culture Remix	Island; The Cross	
United States	2 February 2021	Contemporary hit radio	Original	Republic	
