= Young Empires =

Canadian rock band (2009-2016)

- Origin: Toronto, Ontario, Canada
- Genres: Worldbeat, indie pop, baroque pop
- Years active: 2009–2016 (Note: Officially disbanded in 2022)
- Label: Pirates Blend
- Past members: Robert Aaron Ellingson; Jacob Palahnuk; Matthew Vlahovich; Taylor Hill
- Website: youngempires.com

Young Empires was a Canadian rock band that formed in Toronto in October 2009. Initially, the group was composed of vocalist and keyboardist Matthew Vlahovich, bass guitarist Jacob Palahnuk, and guitarist Robert Aaron Ellingson. After a stint with Fritz Helder and the Phantoms, drummer Taylor Hill joined the line-up in late 2011. In February 2013, the band separated from Robert Aaron Ellingson, citing philosophical differences, and wrote and recorded their only album as a three piece. The band released music until 2016, and quietly disbanded in 2022.

== History ==
=== Formation ===
In August 2009, Aaron Ellingson and Jacob Palahnuk established a nascent connection while playing music with their peers, and the two decided to form a band. Palahnuk later connected with Matthew Vlahovich at a concert of Vlahovich's former band, Turn Off The Stars. At the time, Vlahovich was a solo artist working on a project called GoldenGirls, but decided to join Palahnuk and Ellingson to form Young Empires.

Young Empires officially began in October 2009. Vlahovich was offered an opportunity to open for We Have Band at Wrongbar in Toronto as a solo artist. Vlahovich wanted to perform with Young Empires; at the time, the band had only written a few songs and were given approximately two weeks to produce a half-hour set. Since then, Young Empires have released a number of online demos and videos, which were recorded in the band member's bedrooms and rehearsal rooms. They have also created a website in which Palahnuk and Ellingson are the designers of the graphic elements and videos.

Before the release of their first EP, the band established a national reputation. Within two years, Young Empires gained a fan base through supporting many different bands and traveling extensively across three continents. After a year of writing and recording, Young Empires prepared for the release of their debut album with single releases of "So Cruel" and "The Gates".

=== Early sets ===
A year after inception, the band took part in the Nem-Catacoa Festival in Bogota, Colombia, which also hosted Green Day and Jamiroquai. Young Empires added to their resume by performing at The Juno Awards on March 25, 2011; at the North-by-Northeast Music and Film Festival (NXNE) on June 17, 2010; and at Toronto's Harbourfront Centre on July 2, 2011. There, in Toronto at the SoundClash Music Awards, the band was awarded 3rd place out of five short-listed finalists. The Grammy Awards accommodated the band for its 53rd edition at the Canadian Blast Grammy Party. They hit the stage at New York's CMJ music week in October 2011, at South by Southwest (SXSW) in Austin in March 2011, and The Great Escape Festival in Brighton in May 2011. Their resume includes stops in Paris, Los Angeles, Stockholm, London, and Montreal.

Young Empires has shared the stage with headliners such as Jamiroquai, Chromeo, Foster the People, Dragonette, Japandroids, Girl Talk, Sleigh Bells, Jamaica, and Vampire Weekend.

=== Wake All My Youth ===
After two years as an unsigned band, Young Empires chose to sign a deal with Pirates Blend Records. Their debut EP, Wake All My Youth, was released in Canada on January 31, 2012, and internationally on February 21, 2012. The EP contained seven tracks and was released on Pirates Blend with mix production by Al-P of MSTRKRFT and Burke Reid. "Choosing to release Wake All My Youth with Pirates Blend has offered us the best of both worlds. On the one hand we're totally independent and make all of our own decisions; yet, we're immersed in one of the strongest communities in Canadian music," said Robert Aaron Ellingson.

=== The Gates and later career ===
In 2015, under the Pirates Blend label, Young Empires released their first and only album The Gates.

On December 1, 2022, the band officially disbanded after 6 years of hiatus. In December 2023, the band announced the death of Palahnuk on November 28, 2023 due to a "heart-related issue".

== Style ==
Young Empires' music blends elements of alternative dance, electro, and indie rock. Worldbeat refers to the African and Latin American percussion used in their tracks. Their sound has been compared to the likes of The Killers, Arcade Fire, Cut Copy, Friendly Fires, and Foals.

Young Empires' music has evolved alongside a more ambitious project, a brand called "The House of Young Empires" which designs clothing, remixes, videos, and web pages. In collaboration with a Toronto-based fashion line called Handsome Clothing, Young Empires has launched a collection of T-shirts and sweatshirts. The fashion industry featured Young Empires on the Parisian music label Kitsuné Maison 10, Nylon TV fashion video, and in the magazine Dazed & Confused.

== Reception ==
=== Commercial reception ===
Young Empires' music has been well received by Canadian radio stations. Their song, "White Doves", was voted No. 6 on SiriusXM's "Top 50 of 2011" Since the release of Wake All My Youth, the band made an appearance on 102.1 The Edge CFNY on January 30, 2012, and on The Verge (XM) Online Radio on February 8, 2012. Young Empires was a guest on George Stroumboulopoulos Tonight, which aired on February 17, 2012, on CBC and on MTV Live. In late January 2012, they toured throughout North America to promote their first recorded efforts, including a stop at the 2012 SXSW in Austin, Texas.

They received a highly favorable review of their first 2012 US tour gig at the Mercury Lounge on March 1, 2012, by According 2 G, which stated that "after their set was over, the crowd refused to accept it and was literally begging for them to play more songs. That's a sight I've rarely seen (and I see hundreds of bands a year!)."

Some of their tracks have reached the top spots on iTunes Canada Rock Charts (No. 2), while two of their demos have reached the top 15 on The Hype Machine's charts.

On May 28, 2012, Young Empires released the world's first Facebook Connect interactive music video that was featured on Fast Company on May 31, 2012.

Young Empires have been nominated in three categories of the 2012 CASBY Award: Best New Artist, Best New Single, and Best New Album.

=== Critical reception ===
The French rock magazine Les Inrockuptibles wrote online: "Young Empires' cheeky electro, best anti-crisis remedy [...] These Canadians are fighting against the crisis with their extravagant-coloured pop."

Among the many reviews, the Toronto NOW in its February issue stated, "Wake All My Youth is unashamedly earnest, in a way that makes you wish you were sixteen instead of making you cringe with embarrassment." The same magazine noted their performance at the NXNE Festival 2011 was rated in the top ten of over five hundred bands. The band's EP was also reviewed by the online music blog, When the Gramophone Rings, which gave it an 8/10 rating and stated that the band "has now delivered an EP on which every song has been layered and arranged with the upmost care, and delivered with the most devastating precision."

Numerous Toronto music critics considered Young Empires to be the breakout Toronto band in 2010, while Entertainment Tonight Canada has referred to them as "one of the most anticipated acts for 2011."

NME magazine paid the band a significant compliment in their August 2010 issue by comparing Young Empires' sound to bands such as The Killers, Arcade Fire, Yeasayer and Foals. An excerpt from this magazine praised the band as follows: "...the mathmania of Battles, the gloss'n'grandeur of The Killers, and the calamitous quiver of Arcade Fire... Young Empires have consummately summated this generations' achievements in Rock. Not they're total retread merchants; no, they're master weavers of our disparate indie threads, forging a fine tapestry of future disco."

== Appearances ==
"Against the Wall" has been featured in an online advertising campaign for NYLON TV in October 2011.

"Let You Sleep Tonight" appeared on Ringer in season 1, episode 4. The Canadian Manitoba Telecom Services featured the song in their commercial spot "Meeting" in 2012.

"Glory of the Night" was released on Parisian music label Kitsuné Maison 10 Compilation, on Poule d'Or Compilation 4, and appeared on Cougar Town in season 2, episode 9.

"Enter Through the Sun" appeared on Suits season 1, episode 7. Virgin Mobile featured the song in their commercial for the 2012 MMVAs.

"Rain of Gold" was released on Poule d'Or compilation 3 and appeared on I Just Want My Pants Back season 1, episode 5, the premiere episode of "Orphan Black" and on Rookie Blue season 2, episode 11. On July 27, 2012, FIFPLAY announced that "Rain of Gold" would be featured as one of the songs in the FIFA 13 soundtrack.

"White Doves" was released on Poule d'Or compilation 5 and appeared on Teen Wolf in season 1, episode 5; I Just Want My Pants Back in season 1, episode 5; and on Jersey Shore season 4. This song is also used in the end credits of the film Sisters & Brother by Carl Bessai premiering at the 2011 Toronto International Film Festival. On July 27, 2012, the song could be heard on CTV London Olympics pre-show.

"Beaches" appeared on Real World San Diego, aired on MTV on October 5, 2011, and on Jersey Shore.

== Discography ==
Studio albums

Title	Album details
The Gates	Released: September 4, 2015; Label: Pirates Blend

Extended plays

Title	Album details
Wake All My Youth	Released: January 31, 2012; Label: Pirates Blend

Singles

Title	Year	Peak positions		Album
Title	Year	CAN Rock	CAN Alt	Album
"Enter Through the Sun"	2011	—	—	Wake All My Youth
"White Doves"	2012	—	12	Wake All My Youth
"We Don't Sleep Tonight"	2012	—	30	Wake All My Youth
"The Gates"	2015	19	—	The Gates
"Uncover Your Eyes"	2015	20	—	The Gates
"—" denotes a recording that did not chart or was not released in that territory.

=== Remixes ===
The band has been commissioned to remix for Geffen Records, Kitsuné and Paper Bag Records. They remixed "Self Control" by Sunday Girl, "This Moment" by French Horn Rebellion and Two Door Cinema Club's song "What You Know".
