= Nem-Catacoa Festival =

2010 Colombian music festival

Nem-Catacoa
- Genre: Alternative rock, pop music
- Locations: Cajicá, Colombia
- Years active: 2010

The Nem-Catacoa Festival was a music festival held in 2010 in Cajicá, Colombia, a town just north of the capital Bogotá. It was named after the mythical Nencatacoa. Plans were made for a second edition of the festival in 2011, but this never materialized, and with the rise in popularity of the Estéreo Picnic Festival, which began in the same year and has a similar music policy, it seems unlikely that the Nem-Catacoa Festival will ever return.

== History ==
The festival was held on 9 and 10 October 2010 in the Polo Club, Cajicá. Green Day, Jamiroquai and Cobra Starship were the headliners.

Saturday 9 October

Zipa Stage (main stage):

- Jamiroquai
- Cobra Starship
- Superlitio
- Retrovisor

Zaque Stage (second stage):

- Tego Calderón
- Mala Rodríguez
- La Republica
- Naki
- La Mojarra Electrica

Maloka Stage (electronic tent):

- Young Empires
- Grafton Primary
- Radio Rebelde
- Troyans
- LSCFJ
- Makintouch

Sunday 10 October

Zipa Stage (main stage):

- Green Day
- Don Tetto

Zaque Stage (second stage):

- The Bravery
- El Cuarteto de Nos
- Profetas
- V for Volume
- The Mills

Maloka Stage (electronic tent):

- De Juepuchas
- 3 de Corazon
- The Hall Effect
- MET
- Diva Gash (not on original programme)
- Remaj7
- Galeano
- Camo

== See also ==
- List of music festivals in Colombia
