= Shine a Light (Banners song) =

Single by Banners

from the album Banners
- Released: August 10, 2015
- Length: 3:45
- Label: Island
- Songwriters: Michael Nelson; Stephen Kozmeniuk
- Producer: Stephen Kozmeniul

Banners singles chronology
"Ghosts" (2015)	"Shine a Light" (2015)	"Start a Riot" (2015)

Music video
- "Shine a Light" on YouTube

"Shine a Light" is a song by the English musician Banners. Written by Stephen Kozmeniuk and Michael Nelson (Banners), it was released in August 2015 as the second single from Banner's self-titled debut EP Banners.

Banner told Consequence of Sound "The song is about feeling lost at sea and desperately searching for a beacon of light. It's about waiting for that one big wave to finally pull you under while clinging on to that one last ray of hope. It's a song to the person in your life that offers salvation while the storm is raging around you."

The song was a hit in Canada peaking at number 71 on the Billboard Canadian Hot 100. It also charted on Billboard specialized charts including reaching number 5 on Canadian Rock Airplay chart, number 25 on Canadian CHR/Top 40 Airplay chart and number 43 on the U.S. Rock Airplay chart.

The song was used in Los Angeles' bid for the 2024/2028 Summer Olympics. The song was also used in the soundtrack for the 2015 video game FIFA 16. It again was featured in FIFA 23 as part of the World Cup DLC soundtrack which brought back popular songs from previous soundtracks.The song was also used in the film The Space Between Us, the television shows The Good Doctor and Conviction, the film Love, Simon, and also used for Sky Sports EFL Cup opening titles from 2022-present.

== Charts ==
Chart (2015/16)	Peak position
Canada (Canadian Hot 100)	71
