= Dermot Kennedy =

Irish singer and songwriter (born 1991)

- Dermot Kennedy performing at Bergenfest 2026

Background information
- Born: Dermot Joseph Kennedy; 13 December 1991 (age 34)
- Origin: Rathcoole, County Dublin, Ireland
- Genres: Pop; rock; folk; hip-hop
- Occupations: Singer; songwriter
- Years active: 2009–present
- Labels: Riggins; Interscope; Island
- Website: dermotkennedy.com

Dermot Joseph Kennedy (born 13 December 1991) is an Irish singer and songwriter. His music blends folk and hip-hop. He is signed to Interscope Records in the US and Island Records for the rest of the world. Kennedy gained worldwide recognition in 2016 when Spotify added two of his self-released tracks to its influential playlists. His discography includes three albums: Without Fear (2019), Sonder (2022), and The Weight of the Woods (2026) as well as four EPs: Doves & Ravens (2017), Mike Dean Presents: Dermot Kennedy (2018), Lost in the Soft Light (2020), and I've Told the Trees Everything (2024). He has achieved commercial success with his singles "Power Over Me" (2018), "Outnumbered" (2019), "Giants" (2020), "Kiss Me" (2022), and he is featured on "Paradise" (2020) by Meduza.

== Early life and family ==
Kennedy grew up in Rathcoole, County Dublin, Ireland, the son of John and Eileen Kennedy. His paternal aunt is Mary Kennedy, an Irish TV personality and former newscaster and the host of Eurovision Song Contest 1995.

Kennedy began learning how to play guitar at age 11, after seeing an older cousin play at a family party. When he was 13, he received 50 Cent's first album, which inspired him to listen to hip hop artists such as Jay-Z and Eminem. By age 15, his father, who supported his music endeavors, was taking him to open mic nights in Dublin. He began songwriting at age 16. Kennedy was accepted to Maynooth University in 2009 based on an application for a classical music program submitted by his mother; he graduated from the university with a Bachelor of Music in 2012. During his studies, he formed a band, "Shadows and Dust", which were together for 4 years before disbanding in 2015.

== Career ==
Kennedy began busking on Grafton Street in Dublin at 16-17 years old.

In 2010, Kennedy self-released the EP Dancing Under Red Skies.

Kennedy participated in Glen Hansard's annual Christmas Eve busk, aggressively positioning himself near Hansard during the jam. Hansard was impressed with Kennedy's harmonies, and years later, in December 2014, Hansard invited Kennedy to sing for 10 minutes during his show with The Frames at Vicar Street in front of 1,500 people.

In his first career breakthrough, Kennedy won first place in The South County Song contest, hosted by St. Finian's GAA in Newcastle, County Dublin.

In November 2015, Kennedy uploaded the self-released song "An Evening I Will Not Forget" to Spotify. In February 2016, Spotify featured that song, and later "After Rain", another song by Kennedy, on its "Discover Weekly" playlist. This resulted in overnight recognition and royalties; Kennedy thanked Spotify CEO Daniel Ek by email.

In June 2017, Kennedy played his first shows in North America, which he self-organized.

After much interest from lawyers, record labels, and management companies, Kennedy chose Olivia Plunket and Ed Millett at TaP Music to represent him in talent management.

"Young & Free", released in March 2018, was his first single to chart; it reached No. 82 on the Irish Singles Chart.

In April 2018, Kennedy digitally released the EP Mike Dean Presents: Dermot Kennedy, in collaboration with rap music producer Mike Dean. Kennedy said that the hip hop studio environment completely changed his outlook on his own music.

In August 2018, Kennedy performed for Tiny Desk Concerts by NPR. In September 2018, he performed at WGBH-TV's Fraser performance studio.

Kennedy's breakthrough came with the release of "Power Over Me" in October 2018; it reached No. 10 on the Irish Singles Chart, and, in the US, it reached No. 21 on Hot Rock Songs and No. 5 on Adult Alternative.

In December 2018, Kennedy was voted by listeners as NPR Slingshot's Best New Artist of The Year. He made the BBC's Sound of 2019 nomination list.

In October 2019, Kennedy released his first complete album, Without Fear. It includes "Outnumbered", which peaked at number 6 on the UK singles chart, his first appearance on the chart. He was also featured on Paradise by Meduza, which reached number 5 on the UK Singles Charts in November 2020.

Kennedy was nominated for international male solo artist at the 2020 Brit Awards.

In March 2022, Kennedy won the RTÉ Choice Music Prize Irish Song of the Year 2021 for his song "Better Days".

He released Sonder, his second studio album, in November 2022. He described the album title as "the realization that each random passerby is living a life as vivid and complex as your own."

In March 2024, he released the four-track EP, "I've told the trees everything". The EP’s cover and vinyl inserts feature Kennedy's distinct chirography.

In April 2026, he released his third studio album, The Weight of the Woods. It debuted at number 1 on the UK Albums Chart, making Kennedy first Irish artist to have three number 1 albums.

== Philanthropy ==
In early 2020 Kennedy contributed a cover version of "Resolution" by Matt Corby for the album Songs for Australia, organized by Julia Stone to raise proceeds for relief after the 2019–20 Australian bushfire season.

In March 2020, during the COVID-19 pandemic, Kennedy participated in the Billboard Live At-Home virtual concert to raise money for Housing Works. In May 2020, Kennedy organized his own virtual concert, Sound Waves, in support of the World Health Organization's COVID-19 Solidarity Response Fund.

In September 2020, in the Soccer Aid celebrity charity match to raise funds for UNICEF UK, Kennedy played for the World XI team against England; he scored a goal and his team won 4-3 in a penalty shootout, with Kennedy named "Man of the Match".

In 2021, Kennedy contributed a cover of the Metallica song "Nothing Else Matters" to the charity tribute album The Metallica Blacklist.

== Influences ==
Kennedy cites David Gray, specifically the White Ladder album, and Glen Hansard as his earliest influences for his folk style, also crediting Ray LaMontagne and Damien Rice. His later influences include Justin Vernon, Stormzy, and Drake. Kennedy has said that he derives his ambition from sports.

== Personal life ==
In 2022, Kennedy purchased a house in Ireland close to his parents' house. He is intentional about maintaining his privacy, saying he has "always been resistant to the idea of celebrity".

Kennedy is an avid football fan and player.

Kennedy is not sure if he believes in God, but says he believes in spirits.

Kennedy is married to Aisling Finnegan and has a daughter.

== Discography ==
=== Studio albums ===
- Without Fear (2019)
- Sonder (2022)
- The Weight of the Woods (2026)

== Tours and performances ==
=== Headlining ===
- European headline tour (May-June 2026)

=== Festivals ===
- 2017 Bonnaroo Music Festival
- South by Southwest (March 2018)
- Lollapalooza (August 2018)
- Austin City Limits Music Festival (October 2018)
- Coachella 2019 (April 2019)
- ElectricPicnic (August 2019)
