= Carey Willetts =

English musician

- Born: January 1976 (age 50); Crewe, Cheshire, England
- Genres: Indie
- Instruments: Vocals, bass guitar
- Years active: 1999–present
- Labels: Fiction Records (UK); Parlophone (UK); Astralwerks (US) Bow Music
- Formerly of: Athlete

Carey Willetts (born January 1976 in Crewe, Cheshire, England) is an English musician, songwriter and producer. He has released work under the name "Boxes", and was the bassist in the English indie band Athlete, with whom he has won an Ivor Novello Award for the track "Wires".

== Biography ==
Carey Willetts and his former band Athlete released four studio albums. These are Vehicles and Animals in 2003, which was nominated for a Mercury Music Prize award; Tourist in 2005, which reached number one in the UK Album Charts in its first week and included the band's highest charting song "Wires" at number four in the UK Singles Chart; Beyond the Neighbourhood in 2007; and Black Swan (2009). In 2012, he released his first solo album Stickers. Athlete split in 2013, but no confirmation of this was made until 2015, when frontman Joel Pott cited that the band had “ended”.

Willetts hinted in 2012 that the band were considering to split, when he noted that it was three years since they last released an album, as previously the band would release a new album every two years instead. Indeed, a year later the band released a singles compilation and then went on tour, before being dormant ever since.

== Songwriting and producing ==
Whilst Athlete and Boxes are both on permanent hiatus, Carey has been writing and producing artists including Ed Struijlaart, Amber Run, Passport To Stockholm, Tom Speight, RedFaces, Lilla Vargen, Kingfishr, Dermot Kennedy and Freya Ridings. Carey was shortlisted as Breakthrough Producer Of The Year at the MPG 2020 Awards.

== Boxes Blend whisky ==
In 2012 Carey in partnership with Master of Malt produced a blended malt whisky called 'Boxes Blend' to celebrate the launch of his debut solo album Stickers.
