= Koz (musician) =

Canadian record producer

- Birth name: Stephen Kozmeniuk
- Also known as: Koz
- Origin: Whitehorse, Yukon, Canada
- Genres: Indie rock; punk rock; hip hop; pop; dance
- Occupations: Record producer; songwriter; musician; remixer
- Instruments: Drums; bass; guitar; keyboards; percussion
- Website: twitter.com/the_koz_

Stephen Kozmeniuk, known professionally as Koz, is a Canadian record producer, songwriter, engineer and instrumentalist. Production and writing credits include Madonna, Nicki Minaj, Kendrick Lamar, and Dua Lipa. Koz received 3 Grammy nominations at the 2021 Grammy Awards.

== Discography ==
=== Songwriting and production credits ===
| Title | Year | Artist(s) | Album | Credits | Written with | Produced with |
|---|---|---|---|---|---|---|
| "Gang Bang" | 2012 | Madonna | MDNA | Co-writer | Madonna Ciccone, William Orbit, Priscilla Hamilton, Keith Harris, Jean-Baptiste Kouame, Michael Penniman Jr., Demacio Castellon | - |
| "Up in Flames" | 2012 | Nicki Minaj | Pink Friday: Roman Reloaded: The Re-Up | Co-writer | Onika Maraj, Matthew Samuels, Zale Epstein, Brett Kurger | - |
| "Kiss Goodnight" | 2012 | Tyler Shaw | Yesterday | Co-writer/Producer | Tyler Shaw, Todd Clark | Tubin Thakkar |
| "Jesus Piece" (featuring Common & Kanye West) | 2012 | The Game | Jesus Piece | Co-writer/Producer | Jayceon Taylor, Matthew Samuels, Brett Kurger, Zale Epstein, Kanye West, Lonnie Lynn Jr. | The Maven Boys |
| "We Them Niggas" | 2013 | Ace Hood | Trials & Tribulations | Co-writer | Antoine McColister, Matthew Samuels, Zale Epstein, Brett Kurger | - |
| "God Is Great" | 2013 | Rockie Fresh | Self Made Vol. 3 | Co-writer | Donald Pullen, Matthew Samuels, Zale Epstein, Brett Kurger | - |
| "Lil Nigga Snupe" | 2013 | Meek Mill | Dreamchasers 3 | Co-writer | Robert Williams, Matthew Samuels, Zale Epstein, Brett Kurger | - |
| "Dangerous" | 2014 | Jennifer Hudson | JHUD | Co-writer/Producer | Paul Jefferies, Daniel Daley, Vanessa Kalala, Zale Epstein | Nineteen85, Jim Beanz |
| "Bow and Arrow" | 2014 | Reuben and the Dark | Funeral Sky | Producer | - | Chris Hayden |
| "Devil's Time" | 2014 | Reuben and the Dark | Funeral Sky | Producer | - | Chris Hayden |
| "Rolling Stone" | 2014 | Reuben and the Dark | Funeral Sky | Producer | - | Chris Hayden |
| "Shoulderblade" | 2014 | Reuben and the Dark | Funeral Sky | Producer | - | Chris Hayden |
| "Standing Still" | 2014 | Reuben and the Dark | Funeral Sky | Producer | - | Chris Hayden |
| "Marionette" | 2014 | Reuben and the Dark | Funeral Sky | Producer | - | Chris Hayden |
| "A Memory's Lament" | 2014 | Reuben and the Dark | Funeral Sky | Producer | - | Chris Hayden |
| "The River" | 2014 | Reuben and the Dark | Funeral Sky | Producer | - | Chris Hayden |
| "Can't See the Light" | 2014 | Reuben and the Dark | Funeral Sky | Producer | - | Chris Hayden |
| "Funeral Sky" | 2014 | Reuben and the Dark | Funeral Sky | Producer | - | Chris Hayden |
| "Black Water" | 2014 | Reuben and the Dark | Funeral Sky | Producer | - | Chris Hayden |
| "The Gates" | 2015 | Young Empires | The Gates | Co-writer/Producer | Matthew Vlahovich, Jacob Palahnuk, Taylor Hill | - |
| "Sound of Your Heart" | 2015 | Shawn Hook | Analog Love | Co-writer/Producer | Shawn Hlookoff, Todd Clark | Shawn Hook, Todd Clark |
| "Uncover Your Eyes" | 2015 | Young Empires | The Gates | Co-writer/Producer | Matthew Vlahovich, Jacob Palahnuk, Taylor Hill, Sandy Johnston | - |
| "Life Without You" | 2015 | Tyler Shaw | Yesterday | Co-writer/Producer | Tyler Shaw, Todd Clark | Todd Clark |
| "Criminal" | 2015 | Tyler Shaw | Yesterday | Producer | - | Todd Clark |
| "Shine a Light" | 2015 | Banners | Banners EP | Co-writer/Producer | Michael Nelson | Banners |
| "Ghosts" | 2015 | Banners | Banners EP | Producer | - | Banners |
| "Mercy" | 2015 | Young Empires | The Gates | Co-writer/Producer | Matthew Vlahovich, Jacob Palahnuk, Taylor Hill, Nathan Ferraro | - |
| "So Cruel" | 2015 | Young Empires | The Gates | Co-writer/Producer | Matthew Vlahovich, Jacob Palahnuk, Taylor Hill | - |
| "Ghosts" | 2015 | Young Empires | The Gates | Co-writer/Producer | Matthew Vlahovich, Jacob Palahnuk, Taylor Hill | - |
| "Never Die Young" | 2015 | Young Empires | The Gates | Co-writer/Producer | Matthew Vlahovich, Jacob Palahnuk, Taylor Hill | - |
| "Sunshine" | 2015 | Young Empires | The Gates | Co-writer/Producer | Matthew Vlahovich, Jacob Palahnuk, Taylor Hill | - |
| "Crazy Love" (featuring Tarrus Riley) | 2015 | R. City | What Dreams Are Made Of | Co-writer/Producer | Theron Thomas, Timothy Thomas, Lukasz Gottwald, Henry Walter, Mitchum Chin, Dwayne Chin-Quee | Dr. Luke, Cirkut, Chin-Quee |
| "Way Back When" | 2015 | Ben Haenow | Ben Haenow | Co-writer/Producer | Benjamin Haenow, Andrew Jackson | - |
| "Start a Riot" | 2015 | Banners | Banners EP | Co-writer/Producer | Michael Nelson, Todd Clark | Banners |
| "Gold Dust" | 2016 | Banners | Banners EP | Co-writer/Producer | Michael Nelson | Banners |
| "Back When We Had Something" | 2016 | Banners | Banners EP | Co-writer/Producer | Michael Nelson | Banners |
| "Last Dance" | 2016 | Dua Lipa | Dua Lipa | Co-writer/Producer | Dua Lipa, Talay Riley | - |
| "Try/Effortless" | 2016 | Dvsn | Non-album single | Co-writer/Co-producer | Daniel Daley, Paul Jeffries, Daniel Talevski, Noel Cadastre | Dvsn, Noel Cadastre |
| "Paradise" (with Chris Brown) | 2016 | Benny Benassi | Danceaholic | Co-writer | Alessandro Benassi, Christopher Brown, Daniel Daley, Marco Benassi | - |
| "Hotter than Hell" | 2016 | Dua Lipa | Dua Lipa | Producer | - | Jay Reynolds, Ten Ven |
| "Half Light" | 2016 | Banners | Non-album single | Producer | - | Banners |
| "Into the Storm" | 2016 | Banners | Empires on Fire EP | Co-writer/Producer | Michael Nelson, Todd Clark | Banners |
| "Thinking 'Bout You" | 2017 | Dua Lipa | Dua Lipa | Producer | - | - |
| "Someone to You" | 2017 | Banners | Empires on Fire EP | Co-writer/Producer | Michael Nelson, Samuel Hollander, Grant Michaels | Banners |
| "Empires on Fire" | 2017 | Banners | Empires on Fire EP | Co-writer/Producer | Michael Nelson, Todd Clark | Banners |
| "Firefly" | 2017 | Banners | Empires on Fire EP | Co-writer/Producer | Michael Nelson | Banners |
| "Holy Ground" | 2017 | Banners | Empires on Fire EP | Co-writer/Producer | Michael Nelson | Banners |
| "Lost in Your Light" (featuring Miguel) | 2017 | Dua Lipa | Dua Lipa | Producer | - | Miguel, Lorna Blackwood |
| "IDGAF" | 2017 | Dua Lipa | Dua Lipa | Producer | - | Larzz Princpiato, Lorna Blackwood |
| "Garden" | 2017 | Dua Lipa | Dua Lipa | Producer | - | Greg Wells |
| "No Goodbyes" | 2017 | Dua Lipa | Dua Lipa | Producer | - | Grades |
| "Begging" | 2017 | Dua Lipa | Dua Lipa | Additional producer | - | James Flannigan, Suzy Shinn |
| "We Were Here" | 2017 | Lights | Skin & Earth | Co-writer/Producer | Lights Poxleitner, Todd Clark | Ben Rice |
| "Kicks" | 2017 | Lights | Skin & Earth | Co-writer/Producer | Lights Poxleitner, Todd Clark | Ben Rice |
| "Fight Club" | 2017 | Lights | Skin & Earth | Co-writer/Producer | Lights Poxleitner, Todd Clark | - |
| "Deep End" | 2018 | Lykke Li | So Sad So Sexy | Co-writer | Li Zachrisson, Jeff Bhasker, James Ryan Ho, Tyler Williams, Ilsey Juber | - |
| "Wrong Direction" | 2020 | Hailee Steinfeld | Non-album single | Co-writer/Producer | Elizabeth Lowell Boland, Hailee Steinfeld, Skyler Stonestreet | - |
| "Physical" | 2020 | Dua Lipa | Future Nostalgia | Producer | | Jason Evigan |
| "Levitating" | 2020 | Dua Lipa | Future Nostalgia | Co-writer/Producer | | - |
| "Love Again" | 2020 | Dua Lipa | Future Nostalgia | Co-writer/Producer | | - |
| "Boys Will Be Boys" | 2020 | Dua Lipa | Future Nostalgia | Producer | | - |
| "Vertigo" | 2021 | Alice Merton | S.I.D.E.S. | Co-writer/Producer | Alice Merton | - |
| "Space Man" | 2022 | Sam Ryder | There's Nothing but Space, Man! | Producer | | |
| Midnight Dreams | 2023 | Ellie Goulding | Higher Than Heaven | Writer | - | |
| By the End Of the Night | 2023 | Ellie Goulding | Higher Than Heaven | Writer | - | - |
