= Athlete discography =

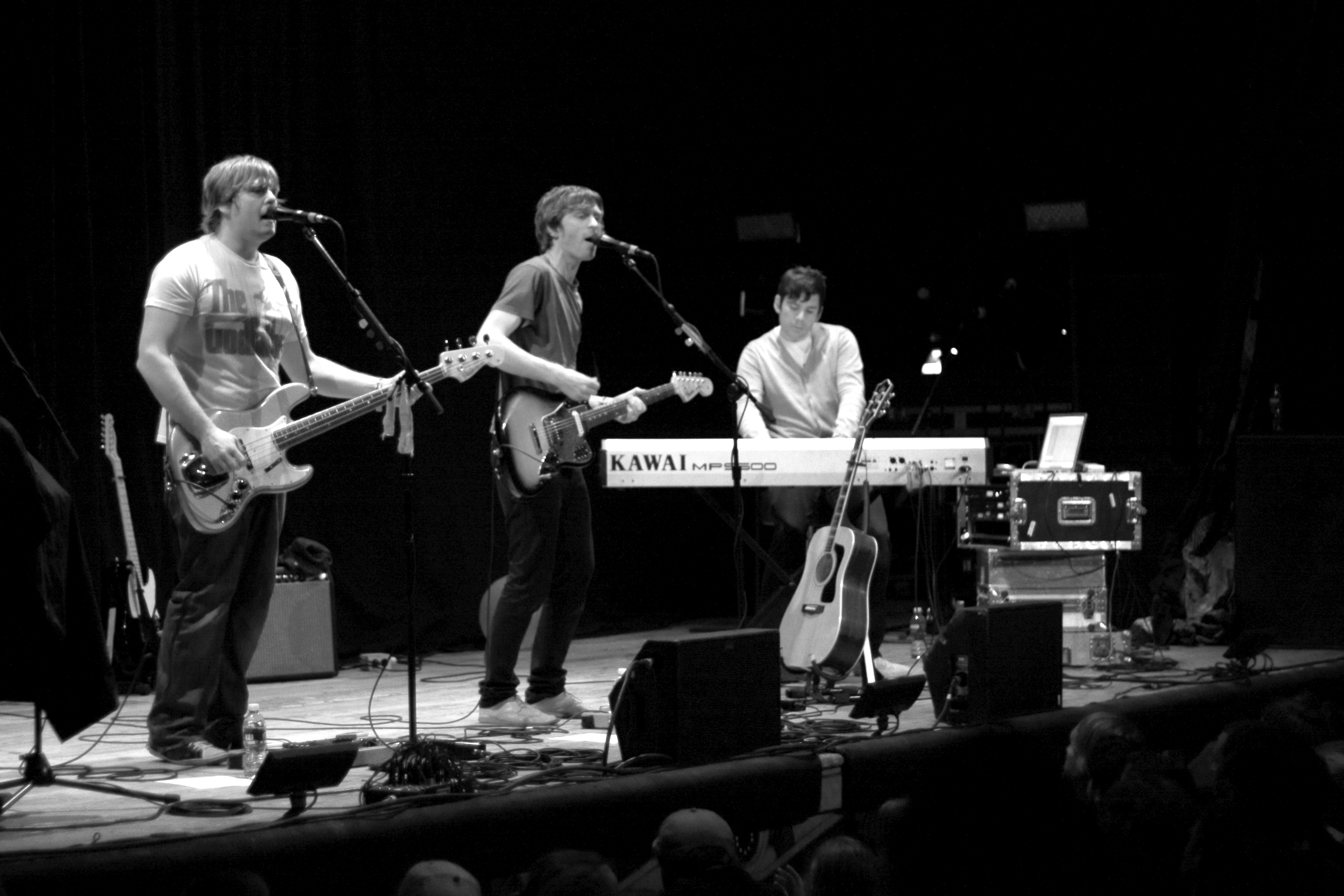
- Athlete performing in 2008.
- Studio albums: 4
- Extended plays: 3
- Live albums: 2
- Compilation albums: 1
- Singles: 14
- Music videos: 13

The discography of British rock band Athlete comprises four studio albums, two live albums, one compilation album, fourteen singles and three extended plays (EP). They formed in 2000 with a line-up consisting of vocalist and guitarist Joel Pott, bassist Carey Willetts, keyboardist Tim Wanstall and drummer Steve Roberts.

They released a self-titled EP in March 2002 through independent label Regal Recordings, peaking at number 85 in the UK. Its opening track, "Westside" caught the attention of major label Parlophone, who signed the band shortly afterwards. "You Got the Style" was released as the band's debut single in June 2002, followed by "Beautiful" in November 2002. Athlete released their debut studio album, Vehicles & Animals, in April 2003, peaking at number 19 on the UK Albums Chart, where it was certified platinum by the British Phonographic Industry (BPI). "Westside" was released as the album's third single a month later. "You Got the Style" was re-released in September 2003.

"Wires" was released as the lead single from Tourist, both of which were released in January 2005. "Wires" peaked at number four in the UK, becoming their highest-charting song in that territory, and was certified silver by the BPI. The album topped the UK Albums Chart, later being certified platinum by the BPI. "Half Light" was released as its second single in April 2005, reaching number 16 in the UK. "Tourist" was released as the third single in August 2005. "Twenty Four Hours" was released as the fourth single in November 2005. "Hurricane" was released as the lead single from Beyond the Neighbourhood in August 2007, charting at number 31 in the UK. The album appeared in September 2007, reaching number five in the UK, where it was certified silver by the BPI. It was followed by its second single "Tokyo" in November 2007. The Outsiders EP was released in June 2008.

Following the recording of the fourth album, the band signed to Fiction Records, a subsidiary of Polydor Records. "Superhuman Touch" was released as a single in August 2009. Later that month, the band's fourth album Black Swan was released, reaching the UK top 20. "Black Swan Song" was released as its second single in September 2009, followed by The Getaway EP in November 2009, which peaked at number eight on the Billboard Hot Singles Sales chart. In late 2010, EMI Records released the band's first compilation album, Singles 01–10, which was promoted with the single "Back Track". The band then self-released two live albums, Live at Union Chapel and Vehicles & Animals Live, in 2012 and 2013, respectively.

== Albums ==
=== Studio albums ===
List of studio albums, with selected chart positions, sales and certifications
Title	Album details	Peak chart positions										Sales	Certifications
Title	Album details	UK	UK Indie	UK R&B	AUS	BEL (FL)	IRL	ITA	SCO	SWI	US Heat	Sales	Certifications
Vehicles & Animals	Released: 7 April 2003; Label: Parlophone (5822912); Formats: CD, CS, DL, LP	19	9	—	—	—	—	—	30	—	—	UK: 240,000	BPI: Platinum
Tourist	Released: 31 January 2005; Label: Parlophone (5607402); Formats: CD, CD+DVD-V, CS, DL, LP	1	—	24	60	45	18	72	1	99	—	UK: 83,370	BPI: Platinum; IRMA: Gold
Beyond the Neighbourhood	Released: 3 September 2007; Label: Parlophone (5031772); Formats: CD, CD+DVD-V, CS, DL, LP	5	—	—	—	—	—	—	8	—	41		BPI: Silver
Black Swan	Released: 24 August 2009; Label: Fiction (2710397); Formats: CD, DL, LP	18	—	—	—	—	—	—	32	98	31		
"—" denotes releases that did not chart or were not released in that territory.

=== Live albums ===
List of live albums
Title	Album details
Live at Union Chapel	Released: 27 February 2012; Label: Daley's Bread; Formats: CD, DL
Vehicles & Animals Live	Released: 25 November 2013; Label: Daley's Bread; Formats: CD, DL

=== Compilation albums ===
List of compilation albums, with selected chart positions
Title	Album details	Peak chart positions
Title	Album details	UK
Singles 01–10	Released: 27 September 2010; Label: EMI (9068802); Formats: CD, DL	174

== Extended plays ==
List of extended plays, with selected chart positions
Title	EP details	Peak chart positions	
Title	EP details	UK	US Sales
Athlete	Released: 4 March 2002; Labels: Parlophone; Formats: CD, DL	85	—
The Outsiders	Released: 23 June 2008; Labels: Parlophone; Formats: CD, DL	—	—
The Getaway EP	Released: 2 November 2009; Labels: Polydor; Formats: CD, DL	—	8
"—" denotes releases that did not chart or were not released in that territory.

== Singles ==
List of singles, showing year released, selected chart positions, certifications and album name
Title	Year	Peak chart positions						Certifications	Album
Title	Year	UK	UK Indie	AUS	EUR	IRL	SCO	Certifications	Album
"Westside"	2002	85	12	—	—	—	—		Athlete
"You Got the Style"	2002	37	—	—	—	—	41		Vehicles & Animals
"Beautiful"	2002	41	—	—	—	—	49		Vehicles & Animals
"El Salvador"	2003	31	—	—	—	—	40		Vehicles & Animals
"Westside" (re-issue)	2003	42	—	—	—	—	53		Vehicles & Animals
"You Got the Style" (re-issue)	2003	42	—	—	—	—	47		Vehicles & Animals
"Wires"	2005	4	—	74	15	73	3	BPI: Gold	Tourist
"Half Light"	2005	16	—	—	—	—	15		Tourist
"Tourist"	2005	43	—	—	—	—	46		Tourist
"Twenty Four Hours"	2005	42	—	—	—	—	44		Tourist
"Hurricane"	2007	31	—	—	—	—	28		Beyond the Neighbourhood
"Tokyo"	2007	198	—	—	—	—	41		Beyond the Neighbourhood
"Superhuman Touch"	2009	71	—	—	—	—	15		Black Swan
"Black Swan Song"	2009	127	—	—	—	—	—		Black Swan
"Back Track"	2010	—	—	—	—	—	—		Singles 01–10
"—" denotes releases that did not chart or were not released in that territory.

== Other appearances ==
List of other appearances, showing year released and album name
Title	Year	Album
"Twenty Four Hours" (Joshua Wong remix)	2006	Sundance Film Festival Sampler 2006 (Sound 8)
"God Only Knows" (The Beach Boys cover)	2007	The Saturday Sessions: The Dermot O'Leary Show
"Hurricane" (acoustic)	2008	Sunset Sessions 2008 Chrysalis Music Sampler
"Best Not to Think About It" (Yogi X mix)	2008	Chrysalis Music – March 2008 Singles Sampler
"Wires" (live at the iTunes Festival)	2008	Pure(ly) Acoustic 2
"Bulletproof" (La Roux cover)	2010	Dermot O'Leary Presents The Saturday Sessions

== Music videos ==
List of music videos, showing year released
Title	Year	Ref.
"You Got the Style"	2002	
"Beautiful"	2002	
"El Salvador"	2003	
"Westside"	2003	
"Wires"	2005	
"Half Light"	2005	
"Tourist"	2005	
"Twenty Four Hours"	2005	
"Hurricane"	2007	
"Tokyo"	2007	
"Superhuman Touch"	2009	
"Black Swan Song"	2009	
"The Getaway"	2009	
