= Beyond the Neighbourhood =

Studio album by Athlete
- Released: 3 September 2007
- Recorded: 2006
- Genres: Electronica; rock
- Length: 45:32
- Label: Parlophone
- Producer: Athlete

Athlete chronology
| Tourist (2005) | Beyond the Neighbourhood (2007) | Black Swan (2009) |

Singles from Beyond the Neighbourhood
- 1. "Hurricane" Released: 13 August 2007; 2. "Tokyo" Released: 19 November 2007; 3. "The Outsiders" Released: 23 June 2008 (EP)

Beyond the Neighbourhood is the third studio album by English rock band Athlete, released on 3 September 2007 by Parlophone. After touring in support of their second studio album Tourist wrapped up by early 2006, the band met up to exchange ideas for new songs. Soon afterwards, they built their own studio in Greenwich, London and opted to produce their next album by themselves. They experimented with beats and did jam sessions; different parts of the album were mixed by Ben H. Allen and Cenzo Townshend. The songs on Beyond the Neighbourhood mixed electronica and rock, while the themes tackle topics such as the effects of modern living, war and global warming.

Beyond the Neighbourhood received mixed reviews from music critics, some saying that Athlete were unsure of their style, while others lambasted their choice to self-produce it. It peaked at number five in the United Kingdom and number eight in Scotland; the album was certified gold in the UK a few days after its release. Preceded by a three-night residency at the Koko in London, "Hurricane" was released as the lead single from the album in August 2007. Two months later, the band went on a tour of the UK, with a small number of shows in the United States right after. "Tokyo" was released as the second single from the album on 19 November 2007. They went on another UK tour in early 2008, followed by a US trek with Switchfoot until May 2008. The Outsiders EP was released the following month.

== Background and writing ==
Athlete released their second studio album Tourist in January 2005; it topped the albums chart in the United Kingdom. Out of the album's four singles, two of them reached the top 20 in the UK Singles Chart, with "Wires" peaking the highest at number four. The band promoted the album with two tours of the UK and one of the United States. Tourist sold over half a million copies, surpassing their debut album Vehicles & Animals (2003). In early 2006, the band embarked on a tour of the US with Switchfoot. During this time, they consumed electronic music and experimented with the music program Reason. In April 2006, they began working on their next album by meeting up to show one another the ideas that they had. While it took them a few months to have new material for Tourist following the release of Vehicles & Animals, the band spent 18 months post-Tourist without working on any songs, making them anxious to return to the studio.

They had made Tourist at residential studios away from their families in London; they decided for the follow-up to work in the city. They located a storage unit on the Greenwich industrial estate in London, which previously served as a mechanic's warehouse, and built their own studio in it. Frontman Joel Pott said another reason for making their own studio was because of demos; in the past, around 25% of their demos would be filtered into finished recordings. The band built walls in the space and moved their equipment there. The band made a performance area in the middle of the studio and hooked up a series of microphones and digital interface cables, which would allow them to record jam sessions directly to the Pro Tools software. As a result, this enabled their demos to have more of a live sound to them, which in turn shaped how the album would form. Pott, bassist Carey Willetts and keyboardist Tim Wanstall spent time writing material individually, while drummer Steve Roberts experimented with beats.

== Recording ==
By July 2006, Athlete had recorded five songs. As the members' confidence grew from making these tracks, they decided to forego an outside producer and produce the next album themselves. Their relationship with Tourist co-producer Victor van Vugt had disintegrated by this point, though they later became friends again. Initial recordings were made to a click track, which would allow them to synch up the programmed portions later in the process. They recorded songs in separate batches, enabling them to keep their enthusiasm for the project. Two overhead microphones were used to capture the overall performance of the drum kit, while an additional mono microphone was used for ambience. After the first five songs, they wanted to have a better separation in sound, which was achieved by moving the guitar and bass amplifiers below the control room. While it did reduce spill, they found the results to be unsatisfactory, forcing them to re-record parts they had already done with this process. Bass parts were then done with a digital interface and re-amped later on.

Wanstall's piano parts were done on a Yamaha electric keyboard connected to a digital interface. The band considered re-recording the parts on a piano at Helioscentric, where they had recorded parts of Tourist. As they enjoyed working at their own studio, they instead went out and bought a Knight upright piano. For some of the tracks, they replaced the keyboard parts with it. A microphone was used to capture the creaking of the piano and the sound of the pedals moving. Though a 24-piece orchestra was employed on Tourist, the band enlisted their friend to do the string parts for the new album. They purposely avoided a clean sound, opting for a rawer tone for the viola, violin and cello, which they did by placing one microphone close and another further away from the instruments. During the sessions, they listened to works from Iain Archer, Autechre, Broken Social Scene, Bernhard Fleischmann and Sufjan Stevens. They tested flicking switches, closing doors and dropping items in order to alter and loop them into beats.

As the band wanted someone to give a new perspective on the songs, they chose "The Outsiders" and set it to various people for mixing to see who would come up with the most impressive mix. Willetts said Ben H. Allen's mix was "exciting and different", removing a drum break and replaced it with a bass part, something he said the band would not have thought of. They liked Allen's experience with hip hop music, such as working with Gnarls Barkley on their album St. Elsewhere (2006), as well as P. Diddy and The Notorious B.I.G. They felt the variety of programming and beats, as well the guitars, would be more understood by someone like Allen. The band promptly spent two weeks at Chung King Studios, where a number of hip hop albums had been made, in New York City with him in March 2007 as he mixed the rest of the songs. They intentionally wanted it mixed on a Solid State Logic desk to achieve a specific sound, as their previous albums had been mixed on, something that Allen's home studio in Atlanta, Georgia lacked.

Willetts said Allen's preference for mixing songs is from the hip hop perspective of: "take more or less everything out apart from kick, snare and bass, so that impact can be made when guitars and keyboards are brought back during choruses". As the band built up songs with guitars, keyboards and pianos, this became a point of contention, resulting in long talks about music and mixing. While the vocals had a "wet" sound during rough mixes, most of the final versions were "dry", affected by slapback reverb, making the vocals appear higher in the mix. By the time Allen had finished mixing the recordings, the album's release date had been delayed till after summer, leaving them more time to alter the songs. They drafted in Cenzo Townshend to mix four of the tracks that had more of a live atmosphere, namely "Hurricane", "Tokyo", "Airport Disco" and "Second Hand Stores". John Davis mastered the album at Alchemy Soho in London shortly afterwards.

== Composition and lyrics ==
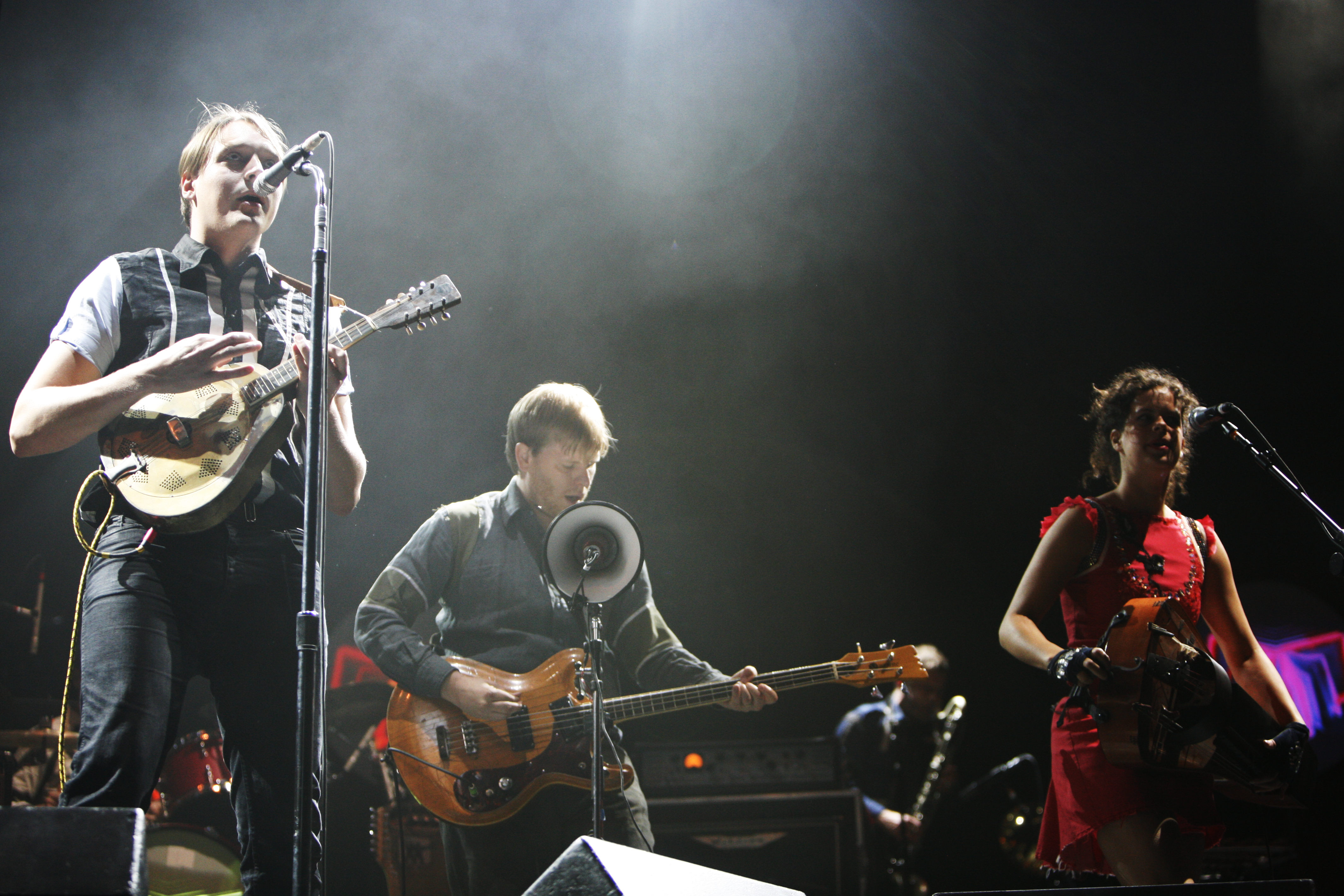
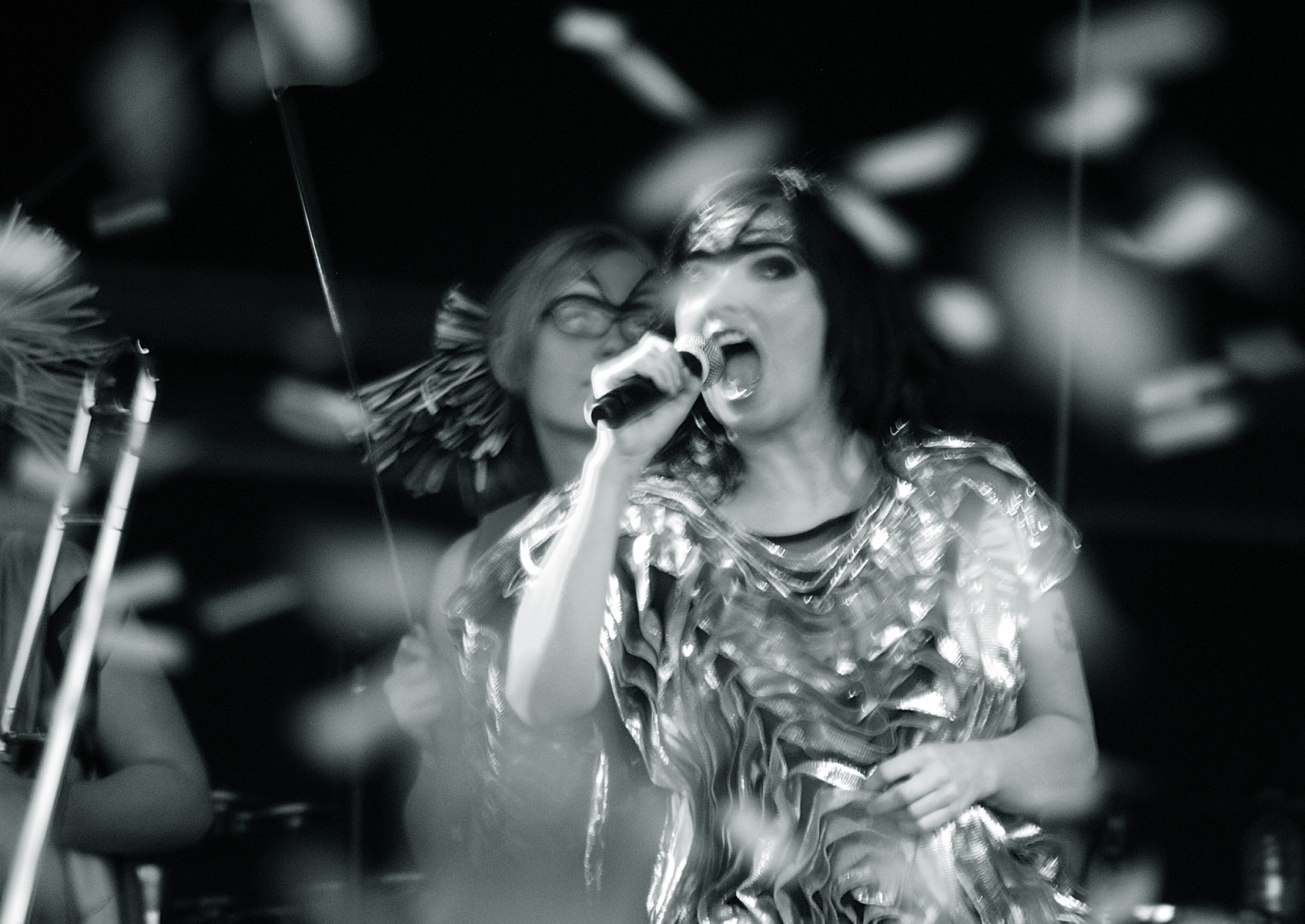
Athlete listened to Canadian acts, such as Arcade Fire (top), and electronic artists, like Björk (bottom), during the making of the album.

Musically, the sound of Beyond the Neighbourhood has been described as electronica and rock. AllMusic reviewer Marisa Brown wrote that the band "continue to explore the brooding, effected-guitar layering that they had previously done, pushing a little bit into the 'experimental'" side, incorporating "curvaceous instrumental lines, echoing keyboards, and a bit of electronic percussion". The band stick to their usual style of quiet verse sections, loud chorus sections, while using electronic noises and loops. Discussing influences behind the album, Roberts said they were listening to Canadian acts, such as Arcade Fire, Broken Social Scene and Stars, and electronic artists like Björk, Dizzee Rascal and DJ Shadow.

Explaining the album's title, Roberts said the "record was written at home, so the songs were looking outside of that hence the 'Beyond'". While Tourist dealt with personal topics, Pott opted to tackle situations worldwide: "There's been stuff going on in the world over the last couple of years that's been pretty mental. How, for example, should I respond to the fact that birds are singing their mating song at the wrong time of year because the weather's so messed up?" As a result, the effects of modern living, war and global warming are themes throughout the album. Willetts said they left two songs off the album, one of which was the "really disturbing" track "Escape" as it "ended up just too dark". Various found sounds can be heard during the songs, which Wanstall attributed to recording around mechanics and carpenters.

The album's opening track, the instrumental "In Between 2 States", sets the tone for the rest of the songs as it showcases the band's electronic shift as Mogwai-esque guitars are moved to the wayside. It evoked Radiohead and the material on their album Kid A (2001), and was influenced by listening to Aphex Twin and Múm. "Hurricane" talks about natural disasters and the rise of typhoons in the US, while "Tokyo", which was written after visiting the city of the same name, discusses the Human condition. "Airport Disco" proposes converting airports into nightclubs if flying was prohibited. It evolves from a looped electronic section to a guitar-centric refrain. The guitarwork in "It's Not Your Fault" recalled the work of Editors; the original idea for the lyrics came from Willetts and was expanded upon by Pott. "The Outsiders" starts with a hip hop beat, switching a combination of an acoustic guitar and a drum machine. It talks about the eccentricities of being English and ends with a variety of sounds such as stairs, chairs and doors.

"Flying Over Bus Stops" is a ballad that begins with a glockenspiel, enhanced by ambience and vocals from Marie of Days That Follow. "Second Hand Stores" opens similarly, giving way to a full-band pop rock sound and the inclusion of a violin. Pott wrote the latter after reading a story where nature goes out of sync with itself. "In the Library" discusses growing older and taking on more responsibilities. "Best Not to Think About It" addresses the September 11 attacks, being directly influenced by a documentary on the people who jumped from the two towers, where Pott changed this into a metaphor for love. The album's closing track, "This Is What I Sound Like", explores the fallibility of the human race. Pott wrote the song after watching the Steven Spielberg-directed Munich (2005): "Not knowing whether you're a good or bad person, or what you're doing is right or wrong".

== Release ==
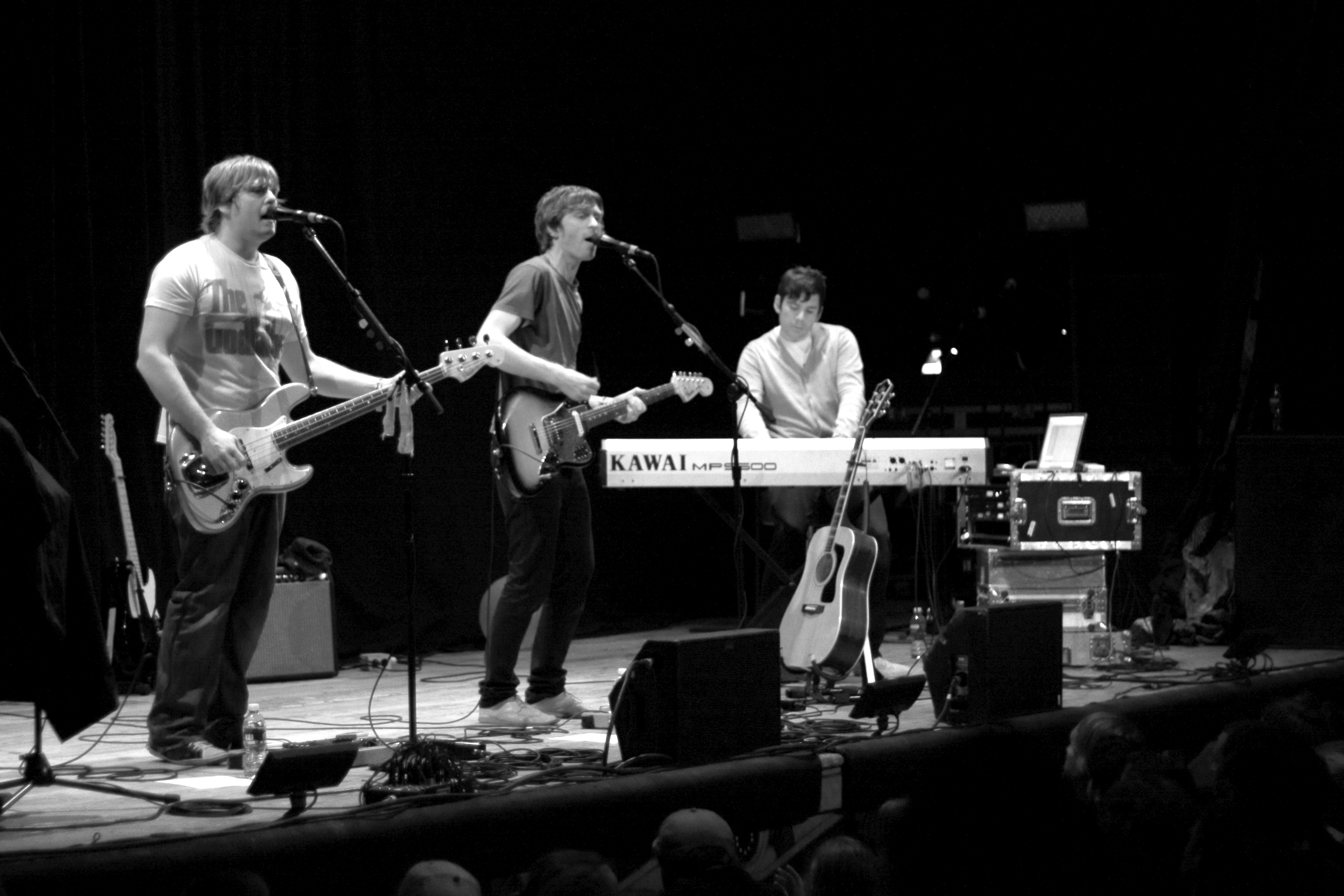
Athlete toured throughout 2007 and 2008 for Beyond the Neighbourhood.

On 10 June 2007, Beyond the Neighbourhood was revealed as the album's title, and two days later, it was announced for release in three months' time. "Hurricane" premiered on BBC Radio 1 on 2 July 2007, and was posted on their website for free download later that day. Following this, they performed the song on TV for Popworld. That same month, the band previewed some songs from their forthcoming album at a few warm up shows, leading into a three-night residency at the Koko in London. Around this time, Weevil guitarist Jonny Pilcher became a touring member of Athlete. They knew him from a remix he did of one of their songs; he was later invited to hear them work on material for Beyond the Neighbourhood. His addition to the touring line-up came about from the album having more guitars than the band's prior work. Following this, the album's track listing was posted online.

"Hurricane" was released as the lead single from the album, digitally on 13 August and physically on 27 August 2007; the CD version had "Lest We Forget" as its B-side. Two versions were released on 7-inch vinyl records: the first with a dub remix of "Hurricane", and the second with "09/05 Speyside". Any digital versions purchased from the band's website or from Now Play included a video tutorial on how to play the song. Now Play offered videos of artists offering advice on playing tracks, as well as the stories behind them. It made "Hurricane" the first chart-eligible track to include a video tutorial bundle. Beyond the Neighbourhood was released in the UK on 3 September 2007 through Parlophone, while the US edition was released through Astralwerks on 25 September 2007. Explaining the long gap between recording finishing and the release of the album, Roberts said their label wanted them to do festivals before they started promoting it. The artwork came about from their friend Stevie G, who was an illustrator; he shared with them some rough concepts he had and they were enamored with the "simple yet classic look he had accomplished".

In October 2007, the band embarked on a tour of the UK, which was followed by a short series of US shows in the next month. "Tokyo" was released as the second single from the album on 19 November 2007; the 7-inch vinyl edition had "Accidents Happen" as its B-side. A live EP of recordings from the Koko residency, as well as a standalone acoustic version of "Tokyo", was released around the same time. They closed out the year with shows in Germany and Spain. In January and February 2008, the band went on another tour of the UK. After this, they embarked on a six-week tour of the US from March to May 2008 with Switchfoot, before returning to the UK to appear at the Bowood House and Zoo8 festivals. The Outsiders EP was released on 23 June 2008, consisting of a radio edit of "The Outsiders", a re-recorded version of "Best Not to Think About It", "Shades On", "Plain English" and an acoustic version of "Flying Over Bus Stops".

"Hurricane", "Tokyo" and "The Outsiders" were included on Athlete's first compilation album Singles 01–10 in 2010. That same year, a dub version of most of the tracks from Beyond the Neighbourhood was released under the title Beyond Dub Neighbourhood, remixed by Dan Carey.

== Reception ==
Professional ratings
Aggregate scores
| Source | Rating |
|---|---|
| Metacritic | 48/100 |
Review scores
| Source | Rating |
| AllMusic | 3/5 stars |
| Cross Rhythms | 7/10 |
| Drowned in Sound | 4/10 |
| The Guardian | 2/5 stars |
| Hot Press | 3.5/5 |
| The Line of Best Fit | 58% |
| Now | 3/5 |
| Pitchfork | 2.8/10 |
| PopMatters | 6/10 |
| Yahoo! Launch | 6/10 |

Beyond the Neighbourhood was met with mixed reviews from music critics. At Metacritic, the album received an average score of 48, based on 14 reviews.

Cross Rhythms founder Tony Cummings said it was not a "classic, but on the whole an album which will satisfy those who bought 'Tourist'". Brown added that this "kind of thing has been done before [...] and reinforces the idea that Athlete are still trying to decide what they want to be". The staff at Now wrote that album was not the band's "triumph, but with far more rock moments, spacey sounds and well-placed hooks, [...] they've redeemed themselves a little". PopMatters contributor Aarik Danielsen noted that while it is "often reflective and introspective," it can switch gears to "become rousing and moving at a moment's notice". The Guardian writer David Peschek, on the other hand, said as he listened to the album, "you find yourself spending an awful lot of time asking yourself whether you're feeling anything yet".

The Line of Best Fit's Simon Gurney felt the electronic inclusions were "sadly under utilized on this album", while its "potential is often scuppered, either through Pott's peculiar vocal tendencies [...] or songs that just don't stand out". Shain Shapiro of Drowned in Sound echoed a similar sentiment, stating that the band barely "scratch the surface protecting the periphery, as this collection of musical oddities is not odd in the slightest". She added that in the majority of instances, "this forced experimentation sounds just that: forced". Exclaim! writer Chris Whibbs said despite the band labelling it to be a return to the sound of their debut, it "still has the taint of Tourist".

Pitchfork contributor Ian Cohen said with their decision to self-produce, they "indiscriminately tack classy-sounding loops and keyboards onto songs that are even more hermetic and lifeless than before". Jaime Gill of Yahoo! Launch countered this by saying the album "balances its meat and veg indie with enough electronic textures and hip hop beats to (sort of) catch the ear". BBC Music's Helen Groom felt the self-produced direction enabled a "more organic, relaxed sound, as if the band took the time to create something distinctly 'Athlete-y'" Brown said it was "still very much an album for the mainstream. It's very cleanly produced and nothing ever gets too loud or out of place".

Beyond the Neighbourhood peaked at number five in the UK and number eight in Scotland. It was certified gold by the British Phonographic Industry four days after release. "Hurricane" reached number 28 in Scotland and number 31 in the UK. "Tokyo" reached number 41 in Scotland and number 198 in the UK.

== Track listing ==
| No. | Title | Length |
|---|---|---|
| 1. | "In Between 2 States" | 2:30 |
| 2. | "Hurricane" | 3:13 |
| 3. | "Tokyo" | 3:34 |
| 4. | "Airport Disco" | 5:03 |
| 5. | "It's Not Your Fault" | 4:18 |
| 6. | "The Outsiders" | 5:22 |
| 7. | "Flying Over Bus Stops" | 4:28 |
| 8. | "Second Hand Stores" | 5:13 |
| 9. | "In the Library" | 3:04 |
| 10. | "Best Not to Think About It" | 4:12 |
| 11. | "This Is What I Sound Like" | 4:35 |

== Charts and certifications ==
=== Weekly charts ===
Weekly chart performance for Beyond the Neighbourhood
| Chart (2007) | Peak position |
|---|---|
| Scottish Albums (Official Charts) | 8 |
| UK Albums (Official Charts) | 5 |

=== Certifications ===
Certifications for Beyond the Neighbourhood
| Region | Certification | Certified units/sales |
|---|---|---|
| United Kingdom (BPI) | Gold | 100,000^{^} |
^{^} Shipments figures based on certification alone.
