= Black Swan (album) =

Studio album by Athlete
- Released: 24 August 2009
- Studios: Sunset Sound Recorders, Los Angeles, California; The Embassy, Los Angeles, California; Metropolis, London; The Neighbourhood, London
- Genre: Pop
- Length: 44:11
- Label: Fiction
- Producer: Tom Rothrock

Athlete chronology
Beyond the Neighbourhood (2007)	Black Swan (2009)	Singles 01–10 (2010)

Singles from Black Swan
- 1. "Superhuman Touch" Released: 17 August 2009; 2. "Black Swan Song" Released: 21 September 2009; 3. "The Getaway EP" Released: 2 November 2009

Black Swan is the fourth and final studio album by English rock band Athlete, released on 24 August 2009 through Fiction Records. After leaving their former label Parlophone, the band members were in a period of financial uncertainty. Following an acoustic tour of the United States supporting Switchfoot, the band made demos with guitar and piano accompaniment. Tom Rothrock was impressed by the demos and was enlisted to produce their next album. Sessions took place at Sunset Sound Recorders and The Embassy, both in Los Angeles, California, and Metropolis and The Neighbourhood, both in London. Black Swan is a pop and stadium rock album that evokes the work of Coldplay.

Black Swan received mixed reviews from music critics, some saying that it was a worthy follow-up to its predecessor, while others felt it lacked lyrical substance and unfavourably compared it to Coldplay. It peaked at number 18 in the United Kingdom, as well as charting in Scotland and Switzerland. Of the album's singles, "Superhuman Touch", which was released as its lead single in August 2009, was the most successful, reaching the top 20 in Scotland. A tour of the UK followed, followed by the release of "Black Swan Song" and The Getaway EP in September and November 2009, respectively. They ended the year touring the UK; the album was released in the US in March 2010, where it was promoted with a three-month tour, with support from Carney.

== Background and recording ==
Athlete released their third studio album Beyond the Neighbourhood in September 2007 through Parlophone; it peaked at number five on the albums chart in the United Kingdom. Out of the album's three singles, "Hurricane" reached the highest at number 31 on the UK Singles Chart. The album was promoted with two tours of the UK and two tours of the United States, one of them with Switchfoot. The band left Parlophone in early 2008 as the label's parent company EMI was being taken over, and as a result, the team behind them was made redundant. Though the band had the chance to stay with the label, they opted to leave after a conversation with a managing director.

Bassist Carey Willetts said the band's financial situation was in jeopardy, as on a few occasions they could "only afford to pay our mortgages for another month". When they toured with Switchfoot, they were low on funds that drummer Steven Roberts had to remain at home, forcing them to perform acoustically. Upon returning home, they did not want to record any new material until they had been tested in a live environment. Inspired by the US tour, they made demos with guitar and piano instrumentation. The band subsequently went on a small-scale tour of the UK, as well as supporting James at the end of 2008.

After borrowing money, Athlete drafted in Tom Rothrock to produce their next album, who was impressed by their acoustic demos. Recording sessions were held at Sunset Sound Recorders and The Embassy, both in Los Angeles, California, and Metropolis and The Neighbourhood, both in London. Mike Tarantino served as the main engineer throughout recording. The band and Paul Wilkinson did additional engineering and recording for "Superhuman Touch". Rothrock mixed the songs in Hollywood while the band resided in Deptford; "Superhuman Touch" was done by Michael Brauer. Don Tyler mastered the album at Precision Mastering in Hollywood, California, save for "Superhuman Touch", which was done by John Davis at Metropolis.

== Composition and lyrics ==
Black Swan is a pop and stadium rock album that has been compared to the work of Coldplay. Pott said the title came from the book The Black Swan (2007) by Nassim Nicholas Taleb: "He was saying that our lives are made up of a handful of significant shocks, good or bad". Pilcher contributed additional guitars to the recordings. The band arranged the strings on "Black Swan Song" and "Awkward Goodbye", which were performed by Prabjote Osahn (violin), Stella Page (violin), Amanda Drummond (viola) and Rhian Porter (cello). The opening track to Black Swan, "Superhuman Touch", was compared to "Spiralling" (2008) by Keane. The chorus section apes the vocal melody of "You Get What You Give" (1998) by New Radicals. "The Getaway" recalls pop rock ballads from the 1980s.

"Black Swan Song", which was reminiscent of "One Day Like This" (2008) by Elbow, deals with the death of Pott's grandfather: "I've never experienced death like that [...] he was really triumphant and positive about it". He wrote "Don't Hold Your Breath", which had guitar parts in vein of "Yellow" (2000) by Coldplay, after his wife had nearly suffered a miscarriage while he was away on tour in Florida. "Love Come Rescue" is an acoustic ballad in the style of the Kooks that tackles the topic of guilt and being disappointed. With "Light the Way", Pott talks about the early days of his relationship with his wife. The Twang-like "The Unknown" was written during a period of financial uncertainty for the band. The Coldplay-esque "The Awkward Goodbye" and U2-indebted "Magical Mistakes" are followed by the album's closing track "Rubik's Cube", which recalls the stripped-down sound of Beyond the Neighbourhood. Discussing the latter, Pott said it dealt with "puzzling through life, working it out as you go along and having to deal with its uncertainties".

== Release ==
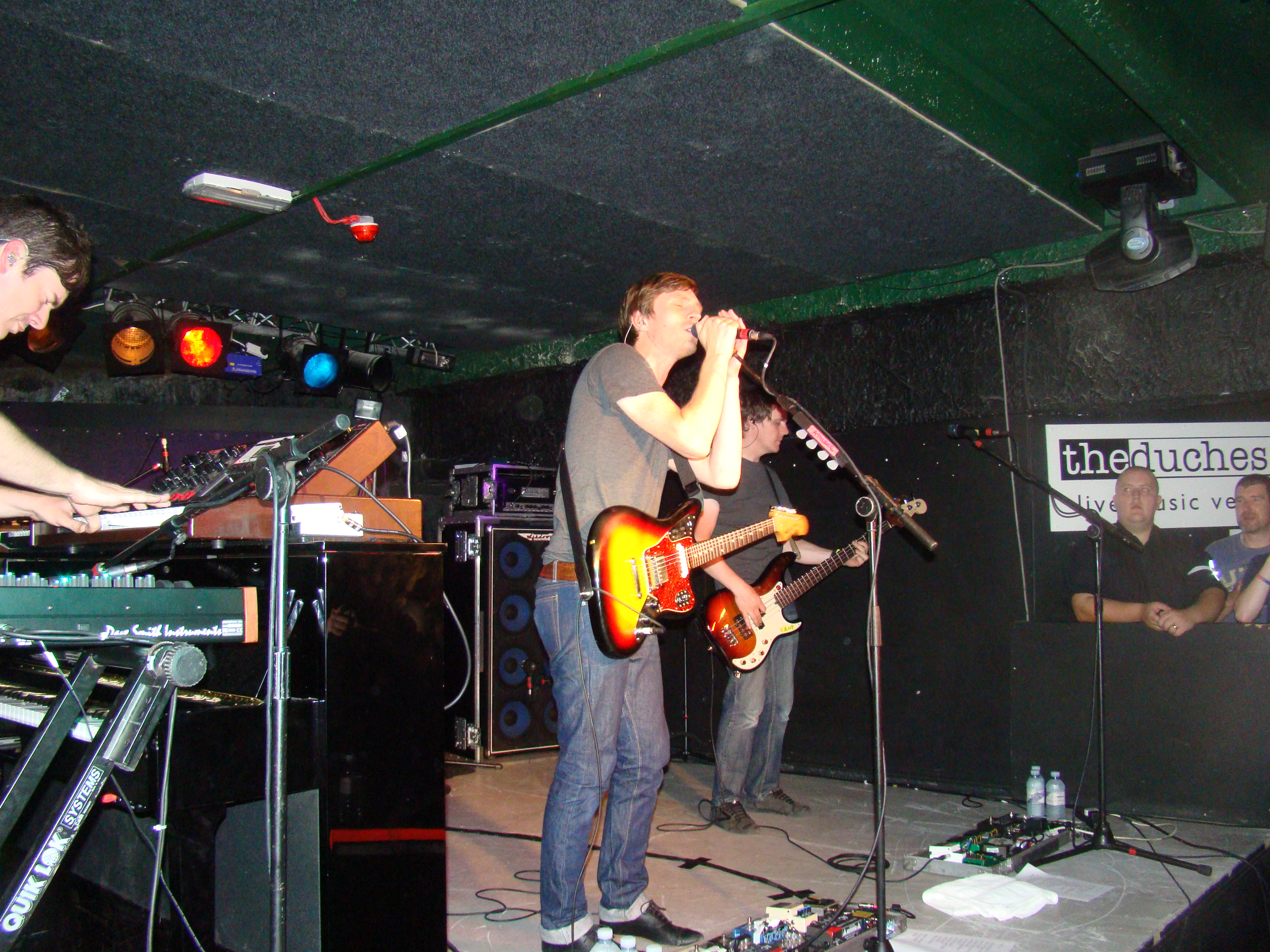
Athlete toured throughout 2009 for Black Swan.

After recording concluded, Athlete received interest from several labels, before evening signing with Polydor imprint Fiction Records. In June and July 2009, the band embarked on tour of the UK. The music video for "Superman Touch" was posted online on 24 July 2009. The song was released as the lead single from the album on 17 August 2009; the CD version included "Long Way to Run", while the 7-inch vinyl record had "Ghosts from the Past" as its B-side. Black Swan was released on 24 August 2009 through Fiction Records. A two-disc edition included "Lucky as Hell", "Animation", "Wild Wolves", "Sky Diver", "Ordinary Angel", an acoustic version of "Black Swan Song" and "Needle on a Record". Following this, the band performed at the Greenbelt Festival and went on a UK tour. "Black Swan Song" was released as the second single on 21 September 2009, with "Cut the Map" as its B-side.

The Getaway EP was released on 2 November 2009; the digital version consisted of a radio mix of "The Getaway", "Superhuman Touch", "Wild Wolves" and an acoustic version of "Black Swan Song". The 10-inch vinyl edition included the radio mix and an alternative version of "The Getaway", "Somewhere Beneath My Skin", "Corner of My Baby's Eyes" and "With You I Never Loose". They closed out the year with another tour in the UK, with support from As Tall as Lions and TapetheRadio. After originally being scheduled in February 2010, Black Swan was released in the US on 2 March 2010 through Original Signal Recordings. Between May and July 2010, the band embarked on a tour of the US, with support from Carney.

== Reception ==
Professional ratings
Aggregate scores
Source	Rating
AnyDecentMusic?	4.2/10
Metacritic	52/100
Review scores
Source	Rating
AllMusic	3/5 stars
Gigwise	5/10 stars
The Guardian	2/5 stars
The Irish Times	2/5
musicOMH	2/5 stars
Now	1/5
Paste	30/100
PopMatters	4/10 stars
Slant Magazine	2.5/5 stars
Yahoo! Launch	7/10 stars

Black Swan was met with mixed reviews from music critics. At Metacritic, the album received an average score of 52, based on ten reviews. AnyDecentMusic? gave it an average score of 4.2, based on seven reviews.

Dan Gennoe of Yahoo! Launch wrote that the album's biggest "difference is that now they sound like they actually believe themselves capable of the highs and lows which previously they only toyed with". Cross Rhythms writer Paul Kerslake noted that it was not a "radical departure" from their previous work, "but what they do they do well". AllMusic reviewer Andrew Leahey said the band "still concerns itself with anthems" and "still has work to do in the lyrics department". Dan Cairns of The Sunday Times acknowledged that it was "pretty but predictable balladry," as the band "prove themselves masters of the style". Gigwise writer Jamie Milton noted that while the band kept to their "knack of delivering a sumptuous blend of guitar-driven pop and emotional balladry", the tracks "have no real meaning". The Guardian editor Will Dean shared a similar sentiment, stating that the lyrics "talk a lot without actually saying anything" and the music is "so all-encompassing that any charm is suffocated".

PopMatters contributor Richard Elliott said there was "no denying a certain haunting quality to the music, but it's a haunting largely carried out by the ghosts of pop's past". Lauren Murphy of The Irish Times wrote that the majority of the tracks "are seriously in need of asteroid injection", while Slant Magazine's Jonathan Keefe said it "adheres to a predictable formula and familiar emotional terrain". BBC Music reviewer Chris Jones said that while it "oozes with emotion, [and] with earnestness", it also had an "uncanny knack for the grand, empty gesture". Now writer Paul Terefenko said the "closest this popportunistic foursome comes to satisfying songsmithery is The Getaway, whose title is sound advice for potential buyers of this album".

A number of reviewers unfavourable compared the band and the album to Coldplay. Leahey felt the band had "been left to pick up [Coldplay frontman] Chris Martin's crumbs". Terefenko considered "Black Swan Song" to be the song that "captures the B-side Coldplay sound they channel on much of this record", which was echoed by Tim Wardyn of Ink 19. Keefe said the minor change in sound "ultimately result[ed] in a lackluster fourth record [...] that sounds like the work of the purely derivative band they've long been accused of being". Paste writer Justin Jacobs added to this, saying the band "joins the ranks of Coldplay clones [...] in a land of make-believe where every chorus is huge, every guitar plays only quarter notes and every song is about overcoming an unexplained hardship". Elliott said that "[h]aving settled on the kind of dynamic favored by Coldplay, [...] they seem to have focused their efforts instead on packing as many emotional gearshifts as possible".

Black Swan peaked at number 18 in the UK, number 32 in Scotland and number 98 in Switzerland. "Superhuman Touch" charted at number 15 in Scotland and number 71 in the UK. "Black Swan Song" reached number 127 in the UK.

== Track listing ==
All songs written by Athlete.

No.	Title	Length
1.	"Superhuman Touch"	3:58
2.	"The Getaway"	4:32
3.	"Black Swan Song"	4:50
4.	"Don't Hold Your Breath"	4:34
5.	"Love Come Rescue"	2:53
6.	"Light the Way"	5:27
7.	"The Unknown"	4:44
8.	"The Awkward Goodbye"	3:59
9.	"Magical Mistakes"	4:43
10.	"Rubik's Cube"	4:31

== Personnel ==
Personnel per booklet.

Athlete

- Joel Pott – vocals, guitar, strings arranger (tracks 3 and 8)
- Carey Willetts – bass, strings arranger (tracks 3 and 8)
- Steve Roberts – drums, strings arranger (tracks 3 and 8)
- Tim Wanstall – keyboard, strings arranger (tracks 3 and 8)

Additional musicians

- Jonny Pilcher – additional guitars
- Prabjote Osahn – violin (tracks 3 and 8)
- Stella Page – violin (tracks 3 and 8)
- Amanda Drummond – viola (tracks 3 and 8)
- Rhian Porter – cello (tracks 3 and 8)

Production

- Tom Rothrock – producer, mixing (all except track 1)
- Michael Brauer – mixing (track 1)
- Mike Tarantino – engineer
- Athlete – additional engineering (track 1), additional recording (track 1)
- Paul Wilkinson – additional engineering (track 1), additional recording (track 1)
- Don Tyler – mastering (all except track 1)
- John Davis – mastering (track 1)
- Stevie Gee – art direction
- Natasha Kissell – artwork

== Charts ==
Weekly chart performance for Black Swan
Chart (2009)	Peak position
Scottish Albums (Official Charts)	32
Swiss Albums (Schweizer Hitparade)	98
UK Albums (Official Charts)	18
