= Half Light =

Half Light may refer to:

- Galaxy effective radius or half-light radius
- Half Light (film), a 2006 British mystery-horror drama
- Half-Light (album), by Rostam, 2017
- "Half Light" (Athlete song), 2005
- "Half Light" (Wilkinson song), 2014
- Half-light: Collected Poems 1965–2016, by Frank Bidart, 2017
- "Half Light", a song by Porcupine Tree from Deadwing
- "Half Light I" and Half Light II (No Celebration)", songs by Arcade Fire from The Suburbs
