= Athlete (EP) =

EP by Athlete
- Released: March 4, 2002
- Recorded: 2001–2002
- Genres: Indie rock, post-Britpop
- Label: Regal
- Producers: Victor Van Vugt, Bird & Bush, Athlete

Athlete chronology
Athlete (2002)	You Got the Style (2002)

Professional ratings
Review scores
Source	Rating
BBC Manchester	unfavourable
Drowned in Sound	(7/10)

Athlete was the debut release by British rock band Athlete. It was released in the UK as an EP on March 4, 2002. The EP features the original versions of "Westside" and "Dungeness", which were soon to appear on the band's debut album.

== Track listing ==
All tracks are written by Athlete.

No.	Title	Length
1.	"Westside"
2.	"Dungeness"
3.	"One Of Those Days"
