= Tourist (Athlete album) =

Studio album by Athlete
- Released: 31 January 2005
- Studios: Helioscentric, East Sussex; The Dairy, London; Athlete's studio, London; Abbey Road, London
- Genre: Soft rock
- Length: 46:15
- Label: Parlophone
- Producers: Victor Van Vugt; John Cornfield; Athlete

Athlete chronology
Vehicles & Animals (2003)	Tourist (2005)	Beyond the Neighbourhood (2007)

Singles from Tourist
- 1. "Wires" Released: 17 January 2005; 2. "Half Light" Released: 25 April 2005; 3. "Tourist" Released: 15 August 2005; 4. "Twenty Four Hours" Released: 14 November 2005

Tourist is the second studio album by English rock band Athlete. It was released on 31 January 2005 through Parlophone. During the promotional cycle for their debut studio album Vehicles & Animals (2003), the band wrote material for its follow-up. Recording sessions were done at Helioscentric Studios in East Sussex, The Dairy in London, and Athlete's studio in London. Victor Van Vugt produced the majority of the tracks, while John Cornfield did the rest; Athlete is credited with producing all of them. The album is a soft rock release with elements of electronic music, taking influence from the works of Coldplay, Doves and the Flaming Lips.

Athlete embarked on a headlining tour of the United Kingdom, prior to the release of the album's lead single "Wires" in January 2005. Another UK tour occurred in March 2005, with additional dates being added to extended it into the next month. "Half Light" was the second single from the album in April 2005, prior to a stint in the United States. The band appeared at V Festival; the performance coincided with the release of the album's third single "Tourist" in August 2005. The band closed the year with a third UK tour, which saw the release of album's "Twenty Four Hours" was released as the fourth single at its conclusion in November 2005.

Tourist received mixed reviews from music critics, with some suggesting that Athlete had failed to sustain the unique style of their previous album, while others saw the new album as a logical progression from their old sound. It peaked at number one in the UK and Scotland, as well as charting in Ireland, Belgium and Australia. The album was certified platinum in the UK by the British Phonographic Industry a month after its release, while "Wires" was certified silver. "Wires" became the band's highest-charting single at number four in the UK, and reaching number three in Scotland. "Half Light" peaked at number 16 in the UK, while the remaining singles sat outside the top 40.

== Background and recording ==
Athlete released their debut studio album Vehicles & Animals in April 2003; it peaked at number 19 in the United Kingdom. Out of the album's four singles, "El Salvador" charted the highest at number 31. The band promoted the album with three tours of the UK, and appearances at the T in the Park, Move, One Big Sunday and V Festivals, between February 2003 and January 2004. During this, the band were writing material for their next album, which they were expecting to take into a different musical direction. For Vehicles & Animals the band members wrote material as a whole unit; whereas for the follow-up, they wrote separately. They then showed one another the songs at their rehearsal space and worked on the ones they considered the best. Victor Van Vugt spent two weeks with the band at their space, where they showed him all of the songs they had prepared and he gave them his feedback.

Recording sessions for Tourist were held at Helioscentric Studios in East Sussex, The Dairy in London, and Athlete's studio in London. Helioscentric is a converted barn; it reminded the band of the places where they used to make their early demos. Vugt produced most of the songs, barring "Half Light", "Yesterday Threw Everything at Me" and "Twenty Four Hours", all of which were produced by John Cornfield; the band are credited as producer on all of them. Ian Davenport and Mark Duggan were assistant recording engineers on a majority of the tracks, while engineer Rick Simpson handled additional recording. String parts were recorded at the Studio 1 room at Abbey Road Studios in London with a 24-piece orchestra. In between sessions, Athlete played a one-off show in London and appeared at V Festival. Michael H Brauer mixed the recordings in October 2004 with assistance from Pro Tools engineer Keith Gary at Quad Studios in New York City, before being mastered by Chris Athens at Sterling Sound, also in New York City.

== Composition ==
Tourist is a soft rock album with electronic elements that takes influence from the work of Coldplay (specifically, their 2002 album A Rush of Blood to the Head), Doves and the Flaming Lips (specifically, their 1999 album The Soft Bulletin). Jean Baker of News24 considered it a "kind of concept album" that tackles "long distance love". Keyboardist Tim Wanstall said the tracks intentionally had "less of the hook after hook", compared to those on Vehicles & Animals, allowing for vocalist Joel Pott's vocals to have more of a presence. Alongside this, Pott wanted to be more open about his lyrics, stating that if "people want to hear my personal stories, that's fine with me [...] but this time I'm wearing my heart on my sleeve". Wanstall said it was "very narrative in its basis, and very much about a band on the road, coming to terms with being away a lot from that home community". The band would typically build a song from a chorus of verse section, written on either a guitar or a piano, adding electronic flourishes after demos had been made. Sometimes drummer Steven Roberts would suggest a part, prompting the rest of the members to re-work the track. Adam Peters arranged and conducted the string accompaniments on "Chances", "Wires" and "Street Map", which were performed by the London Metropolitan Orchestra, led by David Juritz. Noel Robinson and the Nu Image Choir appeared as a gospel choir on "If I Found Out".

Tourist opens with the string-enhanced ballad "Chances". "Half Light" continues the electronic sounds heard on Vehicles & Animals, with a chorus in the vein of Britpop acts from 1995 and a flute-led breakbeat section. "Trading Air" deals with unrequited love; its melody was compared to the one heard in "Parachutes" (2000) by Coldplay. The lyrics were adapted by Pott from bassist Carey Willetts opting to tell an ex-partner, who had a fiancé, that he was still attracted to her. After six weeks of no contact, Willetts and the woman eventually eloped. "Wires" is a ballad that sees Pott singing to his ill child, having been influenced by the birth of his daughter Myla. He said she suffered from a seizure, prompting her being taken to the ICU. "If I Found Out" is a soft rock ballad revolving around the topic of one's inner spirit, channeling the work of Sugar Ray. "Modern Mafia" recalled the band's earlier poppier material; "Twenty Four Hours" is done in the style of Elbow. The closing track "I Love" is an amalgamation of the band's new sound and their older one.

== Release ==
On 21 October 2004, Tourist was announced for release in three months' time. In January 2005, Athlete went on a headlining UK tour, leading up to the release of the album's lead single "Wires" on 17 January 2005. The CD version included "Never Running Out", "Get It Back", and the radio edit and music video for "Wires", while the 7-inch vinyl edition featured "Transformer Man" and the radio edit of "Wires". It was promoted with a signing session at the Virgin Megastore in London. Tourist was released on 31 January 2005, which was promoted with a UK tour in March 2005. A special edition was also released, which included the music video for "Wires", a making-of documentary on the album, and audio tracks recorded at Shepherd's Bush Empire in London. The cover artwork, designed by Richard Andrews and Gerard Saint, consists of an airplane seat, a radio, studio equipment, gas pumps and railings. Baker said it was a metaphor for the songs' "tendency to tie things together, some of which may be their own, while others (like an aeroplane seat), are shared by many". It recalled the art style that featured on singles from Pulp.

Five extra shows, three in London, one in Blackpool and one in Reading, were added in April 2005 because of demand. "Half Light" was released as the second single from the album on 25 April 2005; the 7-inch vinyl picture disc had a remix of "Half Light" as the B-side. Two versions were released on CD: the first with "I've Got a Question", and the second with "Forest Fire", a radio session version of "Wires", and the music video for "Half Light". In May 2005, they embarked on a tour of the United States. Prior to a performance at V Festival, "Tourist" was released as the album's third single on 15 August 2005. The CD version included a remix of "Tourist", while the 7-inch vinyl picture disc featured a radio session version of "Half Light". The music video for "Tourist" was posted online the same day. Following this, the band embarked on a UK tour in October and November 2005. At the end of this trek, "Twenty Four Hours" was released as the fourth single from the album on 14 November 2005. The CD version included "Stand in the Sun" and "Lay Your Head", while the 7-inch vinyl picture disc featured "Stand in the Sun" and "Before Tomorrow".

"Half Light", "Tourist", "Wires" and "Twenty Four Hours" were included on Athlete's first compilation album Singles 01–10 in 2010.

== Critical reception ==
Professional ratings
Aggregate scores
Source	Rating
Metacritic	46/100
Review scores
Source	Rating
AllMusic	2.5/5 stars
Dotmusic	5/10
E!	B+
The Guardian	1/5 stars
Mojo	3.5/5 stars
Pitchfork	3.6/10
PopMatters	3/10
Q	3.5/5 stars
Stylus	D
Uncut	2/10

Tourist was met with mixed reviews from music critics. At Metacritic, the album received an average score of 46, based on 19 reviews.

Andrew Lynch of Entertainment.ie found the eccentric nature of their debut "replaced by a mournful, big-ballad piano sound that's a little like Coldplay, a lot like Keane and a hell of a lot like Snow Patrol". He added that there was "great, sweeping songs with real lyrical and emotional depth". Time Out writer Chris Parkin and the staff at E! Online also noticed this shift, with the latter mentioning that the band "aims for an entirely more conventional" direction. PopMatters Adrien Begrand thought it was a "desperate, depressing attempt to pander to the Keane/Snow Patrol crowd". Matt Ashare of The Boston Phoenix noted that while Pott lacked Coldplay frontman Chris Martin's falsetto, he does have that band's "knack for mixing and matching simple guitar hooks with sullen piano chordings and yearning lyrics". AllMusic reviewer Johnny Loftus said a lot of the album "seems like an amalgam of other things, whether it's the Coldplay-ness of their ballads or the distinct Super Furry Animals influence that's been with Athlete all along [...] Tourist settles for complacent". LAS Magazine writer Josh Zanger thought the many comparisons were unjust "because, despite some general music similarities to any of these other groups, they have a unique sound". He added that the "direction of Tourist is both fun, emotional, experimental-ready and personally uplifting".

Rolling Stone reviewer Christian Hoard, on the other hand, said the band "manage swooning song-poetry and Coldplay karaoke over electronics-tinged arrangements that sound very pro form[ula]", which The Independent's Andy Gil and Maurice O'Brien of Hot Press echoed, with the latter adding that there was "little real invention on show here". Cross Rhythms writer Mike Rimmer was "not convinced that the shift into Coldplay territory is the most attractive move" as "most of the quirkiness that gave their first album its charm" had dissipated. The staff at Uncut held a similar sentiment, as the band plays "through 11 torpid ballads, drained of all their earlier quirks, seemingly laboratory-designed for those who find Keane too edgy". Nick Southall of Stylus Magazine said the "[s]trings swell, choruses rise slowly and predictably, melodies repeat and repeat again and never progress or develop". Pitchfork contributor Adam Moerder was dismissive of the album, saying that the band "abuse the soft verse/loud chorus trick to no end". Though he mentioned their attempt at lyrical strength, "Athlete feel no pressure to experiment with their songwriting". Yahoo! Launch's Anna Britten saw it as a "one-dimensional" release, with its "imagination stopping where Wayne Coyne’s begins".

== Commercial performance ==
Tourist topped the UK Albums Chart, selling 83,370 copies in its first week; it was certified platinum by the British Phonographic Industry (BPI) a month after its release. It ranked at number 32 on the UK year-end chart for 2005. Alongside this, the album reached number one in Scotland, number 18 in Ireland, number 45 in the Flanders region of Belgium, number 60 in Australia, number 72 in Italy, and number 99 in Switzerland.

"Wires" became the highest-charting single, reaching number four in the UK; it also peaked at number three in Scotland and number 73 in Ireland. It won an Ivor Novello Award for Best Contemporary Song in 2006, and was certified silver by the BPI in 2014. "Half Light" peaked at number 16 in the UK. "Tourist" charted at number 43 in the UK and number 44 in Scotland. "Twenty Four Hours" reached number 42 in the UK.

== Track listing ==
All tracks written by Athlete.

Tourist track listing
No.	Title	Producer	Length
1.	"Chances"	Victor Van Vugt; Athlete	4:50
2.	"Half Light"	John Cornfield; Athlete	3:41
3.	"Tourist"	Vugt; Athlete	3:57
4.	"Trading Air"	Vugt; Athlete	4:27
5.	"Wires"	Vugt; Athlete	4:20
6.	"If I Found Out"	Vugt; Athlete	5:02
7.	"Yesterday Threw Everything at Me"	Cornfield; Athlete	3:45
8.	"Street Map"	Vugt; Athlete	4:38
9.	"Modern Mafia"	Vugt; Athlete	2:45
10.	"Twenty Four Hours"	Cornfield; Athlete	5:01
11.	"I Love"	Vugt; Athlete	3:49

== Personnel ==
Personnel per booklet. The band members are intentionally not mentioned in the liner notes.

Additional musicians

- Adam Peters – string arrangement (tracks 1, 5 and 8), conductor (tracks 1, 5 and 8)
- London Metropolitan Orchestra – strings (tracks 1, 5 and 8)
- David Juritz – string leader (tracks 1, 5 and 8)
- Noel Robinson – gospel choir (track 6)
- Nu Image Choir – gospel choir (track 6)

Artwork

- Richard Andrews – art direction, design
- Gerard Saint – art direction, design
- Dan Tobin Smith – photography
- Lindsay Milne – set design, styling

Production

- Victor Van Vugt – producer (all except tracks 2, 7 and 10)
- John Cornfield – producer (tracks 2, 7 and 10)
- Athlete – producer
- Michael H Brauer – mixing
- Ian Davenport – assistant recording engineer (tracks 1, 3–6, 8 and 9)
- Mark Duggan – assistant recording engineer (tracks 1, 3–6, 8 and 9)
- Rick Simpson – additional recording, engineer
- Keith Gary – mix assistant, Pro Tools engineer
- Chris Athens – mastering

== Charts ==
=== Weekly charts ===
Weekly chart performance for Tourist
Chart (2005)	Peak position
Australian Albums (ARIA)	60
Belgian Albums (Ultratop Flanders)	45
Irish Albums (IRMA)	18
Italian Albums (FIMI)	72
Scottish Albums (Official Charts)	1
Swiss Albums (Schweizer Hitparade)	99
UK Albums (Official Charts)	1

=== Year-end charts ===
2005 year-end chart performance for Tourist
Chart (2005)	Position
UK Albums (OCC)	32

== Certifications ==
Certifications for Tourist
Region	Certification	Certified units/sales
Ireland (IRMA)	Gold	7,500^{^}
United Kingdom (BPI)	Platinum	300,000^{^}
^{^} Shipments figures based on certification alone.
