= Wires (song) =

2005 single by Athlete

Single by Athlete

from the album Tourist
- B-side: "Never Running Out"; "Get It Back"; "Transformer Man"
- Released: 17 January 2005
- Length: 4:20 (album version); 4:05 (radio edit)
- Label: Parlophone
- Songwriters: Joel Pott; Steve Roberts; Tim Wanstall; Carey Willetts
- Producers: Victor Van Vugt; Athlete

Athlete singles chronology
"You Got the Style" (2003)	"Wires" (2005)	"Half Light" (2005)

"Wires" is a song by British rock band Athlete, from their second studio album, Tourist. It was released on 17 January 2005 as the lead single from that album, peaking at number four on the UK Singles Chart. The song was written by lead singer Joel Pott about his daughter, who became ill after birth and was rushed to intensive care. Pott paid tribute to hospital worker Ben McQuade, who played a major part in saving his daughter's life.

In 2012, Rylan Clark performed "Wires" on the ninth series of British television music competition The X Factor. The week after Clark's performance, the original version by Athlete re-entered the UK Singles Chart at number 40.

== Music video ==
The music video for "Wires" was directed by David Chaudoir and filmed on a former secret military test site at Orford Ness on the Suffolk coast.

== Track listings ==
UK CD1 and Australian CD single

1. "Wires"
2. "Never Running Out"

UK CD2

1. "Wires" (radio edit)
2. "Never Running Out"
3. "Get It Back"
4. "Wires" (video)

UK 7-inch single

A. "Wires" (radio edit) – 4:07
B. "Transformer Man" – 3:18

== Charts ==
=== Weekly charts ===
Chart (2005)	Peak position
Australia Hitseekers (ARIA)	11
Europe (Eurochart Hot 100)	15
Ireland (IRMA)	73
Scottish Singles Sales (Official Charts)	3
UK Singles (Official Charts)	4

=== Year-end charts ===
Chart (2005)	Position
UK Singles (OCC)	85

== Certifications ==
Region	Certification	Certified units/sales
United Kingdom (BPI)	Gold	400,000^{‡}
^{‡} Sales+streaming figures based on certification alone.

== Release history ==
Region	Date	Format(s)	Label(s)	Ref.
United Kingdom	17 January 2005	7-inch vinyl; CD	Parlophone	
Australia	21 March 2005	CD	Parlophone	
