= Knight Pianos =

Piano manufacturing company

The Knight Company
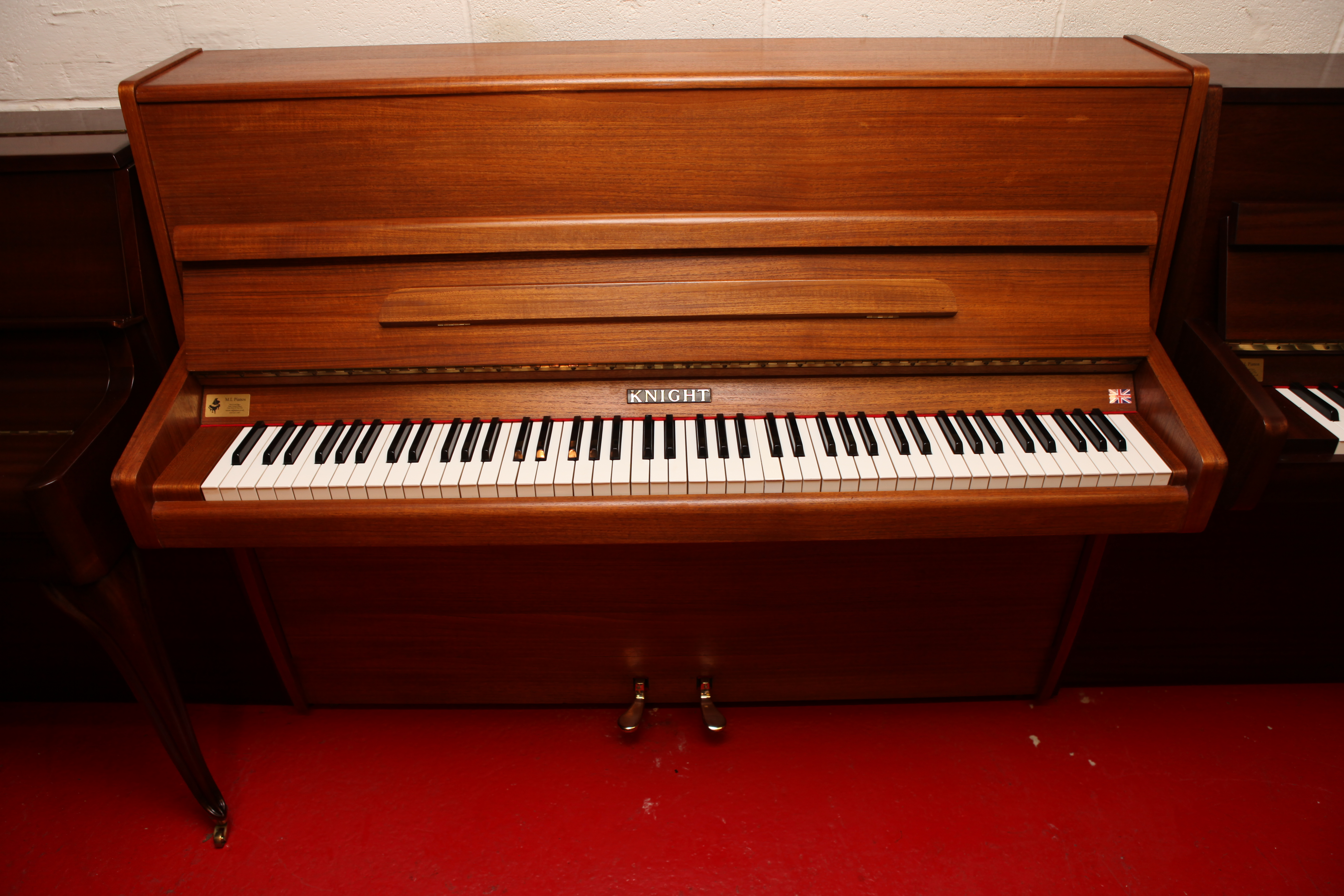
- Industry: Musical instruments
- Founded: 1936 in England
- Founder: Alfred E. Knight
- Products: Pianos

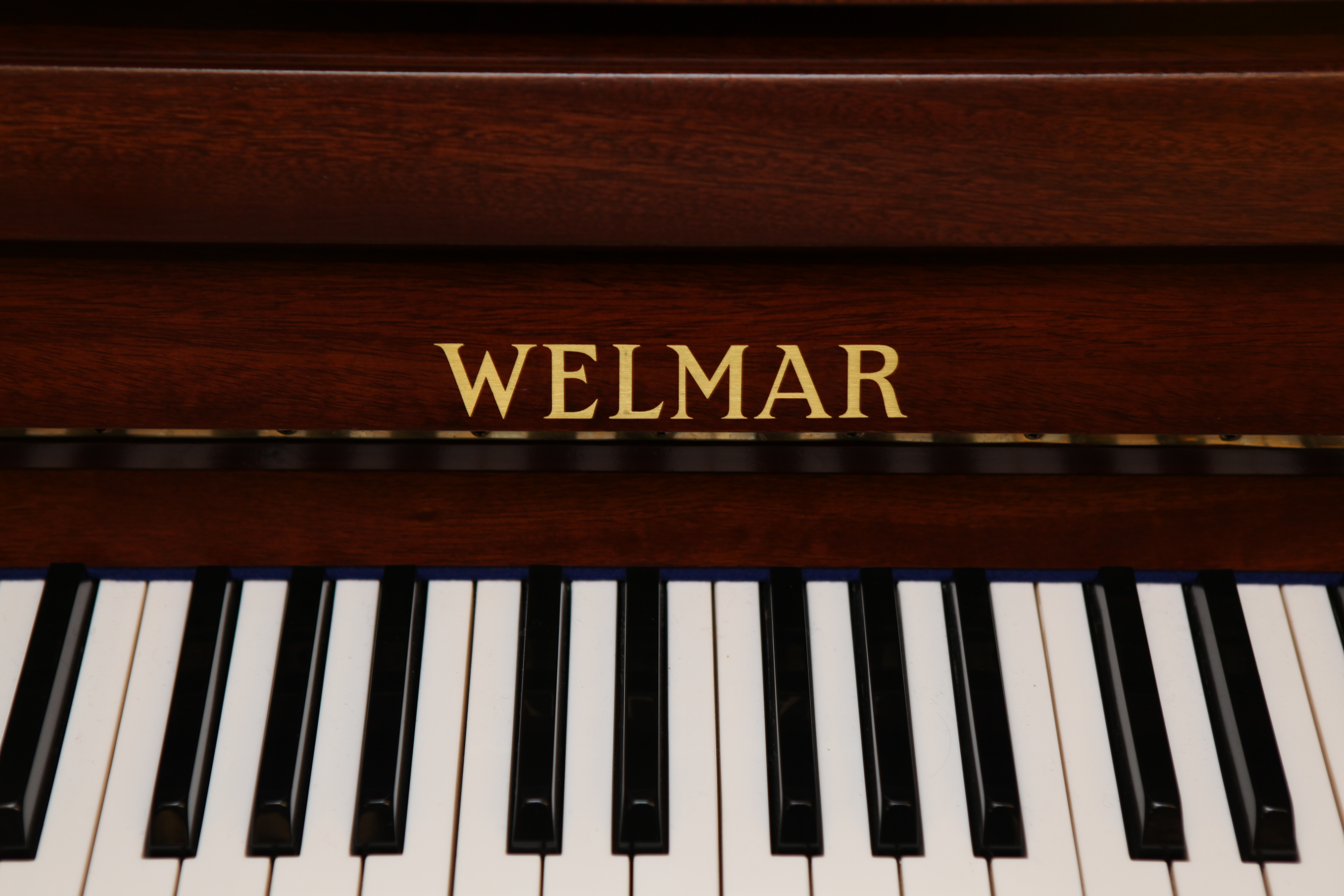
Welmar Piano

Alfred Knight, Ltd. was a piano manufacturing company founded by Alfred E. Knight in 1936 in England. Knight was a highly respected manufacturer, and were the only make of piano in Steinway Hall alongside Steinway's own pianos.

With the exception of a few baby grand pianos, nearly all Knight pianos are modern upright pianos from 100 to 110 cm in height.

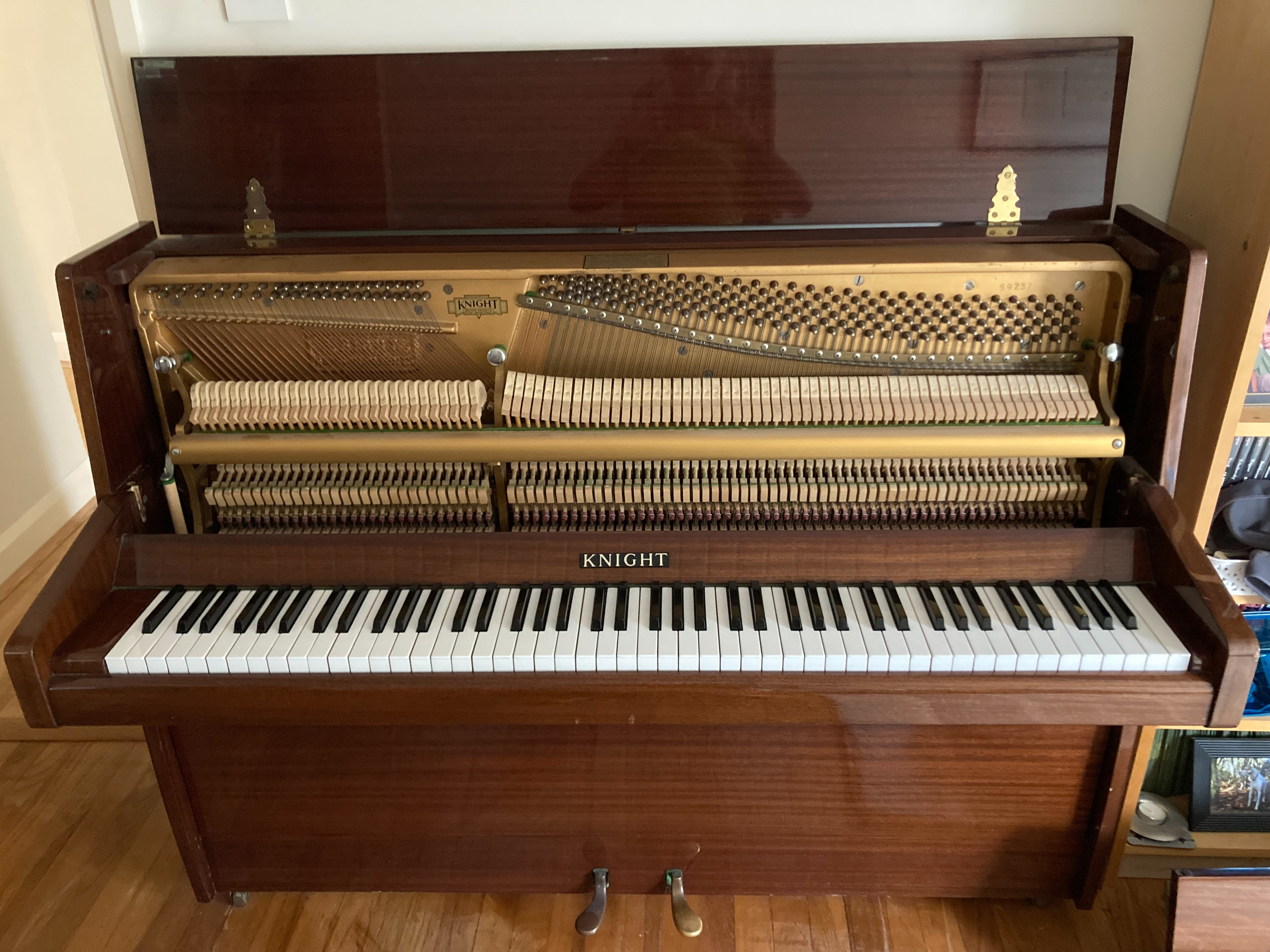
1976 Knight Piano

The Knight name and designs were then acquired by Whelpdale, Maxwell & Codd Ltd, makers of the Welmar piano. Whelpdale continued to make Knight K10 pianos, albeit very few of them, alongside their own pianos using the original strung back design. Welmar supplied the baby-grand piano on board the Royal Yacht Britannia.

The Welmar company, unable to compete with the prices of the ever more common imported pianos from the Far East, closed down in 2003.

Some Chinese-made Knight pianos were imported into the UK, but production was short-lived. Although bearing the Knight name, these imported pianos share no resemblance to the original Knight pianos, or those made by Bentley and Whelpdale.
