= Half Light (Athlete song) =

Single by Athlete

from the album Tourist
- Released: 25 April 2005
- Length: 3:41
- Label: Parlophone
- Songwriters: Joel Pott, Steve Roberts, Tim Wanstall, Carey Willetts
- Producers: Victor Van Vugt, John Cornfield, Athlete

Athlete singles chronology
"Wires" (2005)	"Half Light" (2005)	"Tourist" (2005)

"Half Light" is a song by British rock band Athlete from their second album, Tourist. It was released on 25 April 2005 as the second single from that album, peaking at number 16 in the UK Singles Chart (see 2005 in British music). In March 2006, the song was the title track to an exclusive iTunes EP featuring B-sides and remixes from all of the band's singles for Tourist.

As with the previous single, Wires, the content of the song is autobiographical. The lyrics speak of singer, Joel Pott's, regret at being far away from his family whilst on tour, of how difficult it is to conduct a relationship with them over the telephone and how, when he finally gets to spend some time at home, he will 'make the most of it'.

The song was used for Sky One to commemorate the final episode of Star Trek: Enterprise in August 2005.

== Track listings ==
- 7-inch (ATH008)
1. "Half Light" – 3:41
2. "Half Light" (Eddy TM Losers remix) – 5:30
- CD (CDATH008)
1. "Half Light" – 3:41
2. "I've Got a Question" – 4:09
- Maxi-CD (CDATHS008)
1. "Half Light" – 3:41
2. "Forest Fire" – 3:33
3. "Wires" (BBC Jo Whiley Session) – 4:06
4. "Half Light" (video)

- iTunes EP
1. "Half Light" (Michael Brauer edit) – 3:08
2. "Stand in the Sun" – 4:56
3. "Tourist" (Roots Manuva remix) – 4:54
4. "Lay Your Head" – 4:56
5. "Never Running Out" – 4:26
6. "Forest Fire" – 3:33
7. "Half Light" (Eddy TM Losers remix) – 5:30
8. "Transformer Man" – 3:18
9. "I've Got a Question" – 4:09

== Charts ==
Chart (2005)	Peak position
Scottish Singles Sales (Official Charts)	16
UK Singles (Official Charts)	16
