= Athlete (band) =

English indie rock band

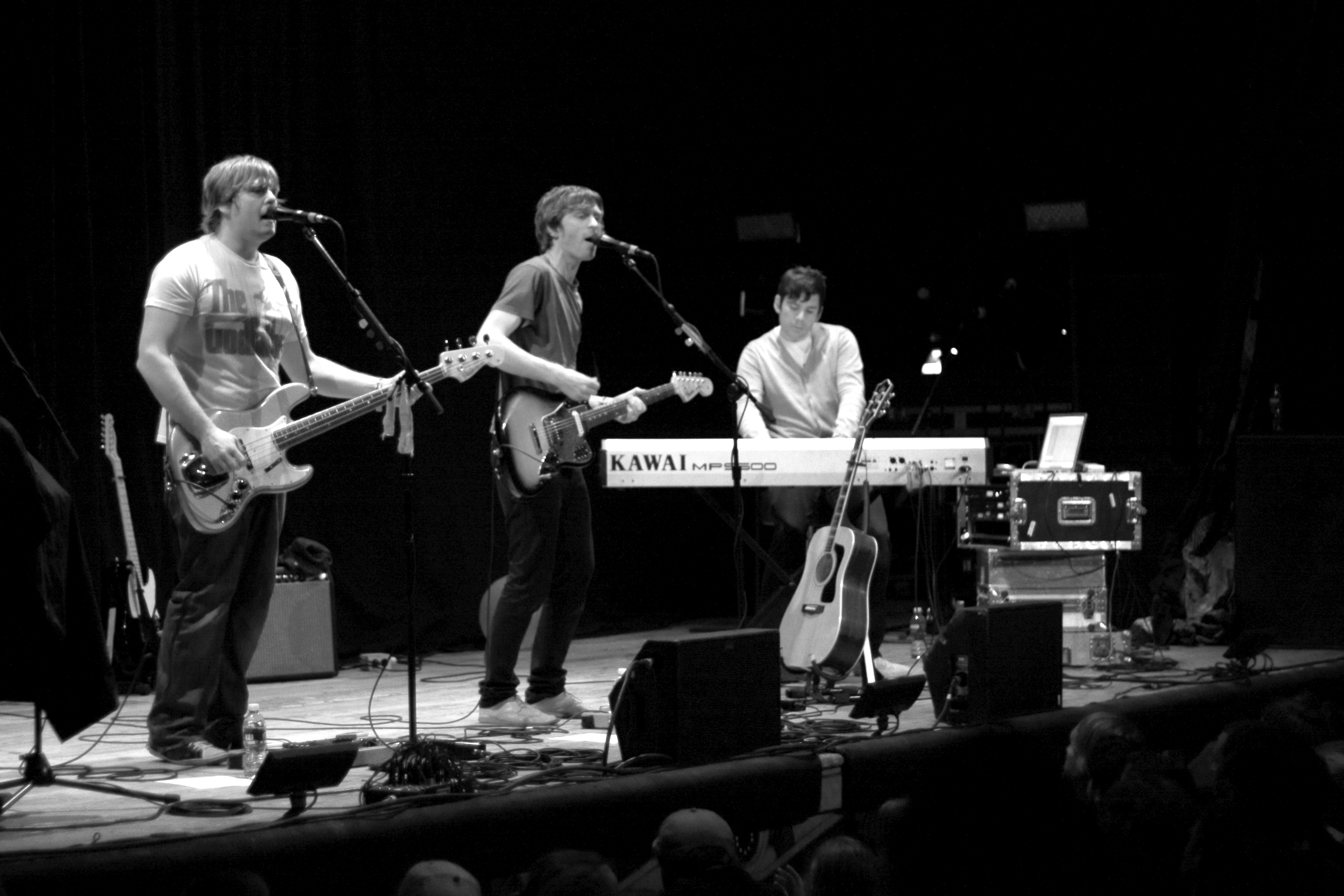
- Athlete performing in 2008

Background information
- Origin: Deptford, London, England
- Genres: Indie rock; alternative rock; post-Britpop
- Years active: 2000–2013
- Labels: Parlophone; Astralwerks; Fiction
- Past members: Joel Pott; Carey Willetts; Steve Roberts; Tim Wanstall

Athlete were an English indie rock band formed in Deptford, London, comprising Joel Pott (lead vocals and guitar), Carey Willetts (bass and backing vocals), Stephen Roberts (drums and backing vocals), Tim Wanstall (keyboards).

The band had a brief period of high-profile domestic success in which their debut album Vehicles & Animals (2003) was a platinum seller in 2005 and Mercury Music Prize nomination. It was followed up by Tourist (2005) which reached No. 1 and sold over 500,000 copies allowing this album to also go platinum. Athlete's subsequent two albums, Beyond the Neighbourhood (2007) and Black Swan (2009), saw the band exploring different styles, influenced by the works of artists such as Nick Cave & the Bad Seeds.

The band has been on hiatus since anniversary tours in 2012 and 2013. Joel Pott has been working since then as songwriter and producer for other artists. Carey Willets released a solo album in 2012, called Stickers and has another project called "Boxes". Stephen Roberts and Tim Wanstall have been working on production with other bands. In 2011, Stephen Roberts stated that they set aside plans for a fifth record, have no plans to make a new album, and are exploring different careers. Since then, they have been relatively quiet.

== History ==
=== Debut releases and development (2000–2002) ===
Friends since the age of fourteen, Athlete took their wide ranging influences such as Grandaddy and The Flaming Lips and started jamming and practising in the basement of The Bear, a pub which was converted into a church and sandwich bar, on Deptford High Street in 1999. They began recording there, before sending demos out.

Signing with Regal Recordings, the band released their first single "Westside" in February 2002, which was a hit, garnering airplay on BBC Radio 1 and paving the way for another single, "You Got the Style" which cracked the Top 40 in June. Parlophone took notice and promptly signed the musicians, who entered the studio with producer Victor Van Vugt (Nick Cave & the Bad Seeds, Beth Orton) in late 2002 to record their first studio LP.

=== Commercial success, but mixed critical reception (2003–2006) ===
The band came to prominence in 2003 with their debut album, Vehicles and Animals, producing popular singles such as "You Got the Style" and "El Salvador". The album earned a Mercury Music Prize nomination and went on to sell over 250,000 copies. They played their first live session on UK radio on the Dermot O'Leary Show on BBC Radio 2. Following the release of the album in April 2003, the summer of that year was a particularly fruitful time. Shortly after Glastonbury and T in The Park festivals, the band were nominated for the Mercury Award. After nomination, the album went from silver (60,000 sales) to gold (100,000) in the space of two weeks. "I think there's an underdog waiting to be discovered by the Mercury every year," said Steve. "And that year it was us." "By the time we played V at the end of the summer it seemed like everybody there knew the record,' said Joel Pott, 'There was 20,000 people, all singing along.'

Their second album, Tourist, reached Number One in the UK Album Charts in its first week, following the huge success of single "Wires". The song was written about Pott's newborn baby who was rushed to intensive care after a premature birth, and in 2006 it won them the Ivor Novello Award for "Best Contemporary Song". In the UK charts, the band has frequently been frustrated by singles just missing out on top 40 placings, due to inconsistent support by music television channels and radio stations. For instance, certain songs, such as "Wires" and "Half Light", were played up to 10 times a day on larger UK radio stations, yet other singles such as "Westside" and "Tourist" received little radio play.

Tourist had a mixed critical reception, with some suggesting that Athlete had failed to sustain the unique style of their previous album, while others saw the new album as a logical progression from their old sound. Allmusic wrote that "Its art direction is a winning tribute to the striking cover art of Britpop past, but musically, Tourist settles for complacent." The supporting tour took place between 2005 and mid-2006.

=== Development with subsequent releases (2007–2009) ===
On 10 June 2007, it was announced that the title of their third album would be Beyond the Neighbourhood. The album was recorded by the band themselves in their own studio, and mixed by Ben Allen and Michael Brauer, who had worked on Tourist. Released on 3 September 2007, Beyond the Neighbourhood was a self-produced collection of low-key songs, viewed as a disappointment by some, and an interesting sidestep by others. Jonny Pilcher contributed additional guitar on 7 tracks. Pilcher then played live with the band on the subsequent tour. It entered at No. 5 on the UK album chart. Singles included Beach Boys-influenced "Hurricane", charting disappointingly at number 31, also "Tokyo" which missed the Top 100 (number 198) and "The Outsiders EP", which did not chart at all.

They embarked on tours of the UK in late 2007 and early 2008 in support of the album. They also played during the 2008 TT motorcycle racing festival on the Isle of Man.

Black Swan is the fourth studio album produced by the band. Athlete recorded this album while temporarily unsigned. American producer Tom Rothrock collaborated with the group long distance after hearing only a few acoustic demos. In April they announced a 29 date tour of the UK to promote their new album. The tour took place throughout June and July. On 2 June 2009 it was announced that the band had parted ways with Parlophone Records and signed up with Fiction Records, who released "Black Swan" on 24 August 2009. The first single from the album "Superhuman Touch" was released on 17 August 2009, entering the UK charts at No. 74, climbing to No. 71 a week later. On 12 June 2009, Athlete released the song "Summer Sun" as a free download for email-subscribers. The song is not included in the track listing confirmed by band member Carey Willetts, and is likely to be considered as a b-side from the upcoming album. The first single to be released in America is "The Getaway". On 9 November 2009, Athlete released "Black Swan Song" as a single.

=== Compilation releases, touring and split (2010–2013) ===
Singles 1–10 was the first compilation album released by the band. Many of the bands big hits, including "El Salvador" and "Wires" appear on this album. The selection of tracks spans the past 10 years. There is one previously unreleased song on the album entitled "Back Track." After the release Athlete completed a tour of Britain, Europe and North America from March till December 2010, performing the hits from the non-bonus edition. The band toured in July across Britain, and in August headlined Union Chapel, and also took the stage at Bingley Music Live and Brownstock Festival in 3 and 4 September 2011.

In 2011 the band toured some of their biggest songs, but in a "stripped back" fashion. The idea was that the band took some of their songs and reworked them completely to be played in an acoustic style. The tour came around after the band played a small gig at London's Canary Wharf. After the gig was highly successful, they announced the tour which included 18 dates across the U.K with two dates at London's Union Chapel. The second of which was recorded for a live album "Live at Union Chapel" released early in 2012. The album has 12 songs including the singles "Wires" and "Half Light" and includes the band talking to the audience between songs. This was Athlete's fourth live EP after two iTunes Festival EPs and the "Tokyo EP" recorded at Camden Koko.

In a September 2011 interview, keyboardist Tim Wanstall said "it's been every two years (releasing an album) on the odd numbers since 2003 so this is the first year to break that cycle. Actually we're all exploring individual paths at the moment so the if/how/when of another album is a pretty open book." In 2012 the band performed at several festivals including Hop Farm Festival, Shindig Festival and Lakefest. In May 2013, the band embarked on Vehicles & Animals 10th Anniversary Tour, with dates at Bristol Academy, Cambridge Junction and Shepherd's Bush Empire.

Since this tour, the band became dormant and later split. Pott turned to songwriting and production duties for other artists, forging working relationship with George Ezra, co-writing and producing his first two studio albums: Wanted on Voyage (2014) and Staying at Tamara's (2018), as well as co-writing Shura's debut effort Nothing's Real (2016). He referred to his time in the band in the past tense in a 2015 interview with M Magazine. Stephen Roberts and Tim Wanstall have been working on production with other bands. Carey Willets released his first solo album in 2012, called Stickers, while also working on production and on a project called "Boxes".

== Discography ==
Studio albums

- Vehicles & Animals (2003)
- Tourist (2005)
- Beyond the Neighbourhood (2007)
- Black Swan (2009)

== Members ==
- Joel Pott – lead vocals and guitar
- Carey Willetts – bass and backing vocals
- Stephen Roberts – drums and backing vocals
- Tim Wanstall – keyboards and backing vocals
