= Vehicles & Animals =

Studio album by Athlete
- Released: 7 April 2003
- Recorded: 2002
- Genres: Indie rock, post-Britpop
- Length: 45:38
- Label: Parlophone
- Producers: Victor Van Vugt, Athlete

Athlete chronology
Athlete (2002)	Vehicles & Animals (2003)	Tourist (2005)

Singles from Vehicles & Animals
- 1. "You Got the Style" Released: 10 June 2002; 2. "Beautiful" Released: 4 November 2002; 3. "El Salvador" Released: 24 March 2003; 4. "Westside" Released: 23 May 2003

Vehicles & Animals is the debut studio album by British rock band Athlete. It was released on 7 April 2003 through Parlophone. After changing their music style from Britpop, Athlete released a self-titled extended play (EP) in early 2002; its lead track "Westside" brought attention from Parlophone and the band joined the label. "You Got the Style" was released as a single in mid 2002, after which Athlete recording their debut album with producer Victor Van Vugt. Vehicles & Animals is an indie rock and post-Britpop album that emulates the style of Blur, Eels and Stereophonics.

Vehicles & Animals received generally positive reviews from music critics, though some of them saw it as uninspiring. The album charted at number 19 in the United Kingdom, and was certified platinum by the British Phonographic Industry in 2005. "Beautiful" was released as the second single from Vehicles & Animals, followed by the third single "El Salvador" and a UK tour in early 2003. The fourth single "Westside" and a re-release of "You Got the Style" appeared in June and September 2003, respectively. Two more UK tours followed, one closing 2003 and the other opening 2004. Of the album's singles, "El Salvador" had the highest chart peak, reaching number 31 in the UK and number 40 in Scotland.

== Background and recording ==
When Athlete formed in 2000, their line up consisted of vocalist and guitarist Joel Pott, bassist Carey Willetts, keyboardist Tim Wanstall and drummer Steve Roberts. When Wanstall left the band to study at university, the other members continued playing gigs in Camden, London. Their style was akin to the Britpop sound of the 1990s but when Wanstall returned to the line up, they changed style to one similar to the works of Beck, Gomez and Turin Brakes. Athlete released a self-titled extended play (EP) on 4 March 2002 through Regal Recordings; its lead track "Westside" received airplay on BBC Radio 1 and attracted the attention of Parlophone, who signed the band soon after. Pott said the band had written only four songs at the time of the signing, whereas other bands would have an album's worth ready.

On 17 June 2002, "You Got the Style" was released as a single, which was followed by a tour of the United Kingdom and a supporting slot for Suede. In late 2002, Athlete recorded their debut album, co-producing it with Victor Van Vugt. Sessions were held in the basement of a church; during recording, they took a break from recording to tour with Mansun and the Polyphonic Spree. Parlorhone told the band to record at their own pace because they did not want the band to quickly release a product solely to keep momentum going. Pete Collis served as engineer on "Westside" and "Dungeness". Athlete and Bird & Bush – consisting of Marshall Bird and Steve Bush – did the initial production on "Dungeness". Matt Frost and Adam "A Skillz" Mills did additional programming on "Out of Nowhere", and Vugt and the band mixed the final recordings.

== Composition and lyrics ==
The sound of Vehicles & Animals has been described as indie rock and post-Britpop in the style of Blur, Eels and Stereophonics. In a review for The Guardian, journalist Alexis Petridis wrote for the majority of the release, "Athlete sound like finalists in a contest to discover Britain's Most Unfashionable Band, mixing Parklife chirpiness with the acid songwriting style of Joe Jackson ... and occasionally throwing in big beat-like rhythms". Pott's vocals resemble those by the Police frontman Sting. Discussing the album's title, Pott said; "Vehicles and animals on their own are two interesting things, and when you put them together it sounds quite weird. We like to have good pop tunes but couple that with weird sounds and mess it up". One of the album's recurring topics is the members finding happiness in their home town Deptford. Wanstall said it was "very much a bunch of stories about our little community, in our little corner of London, and just full of the joys" of being a recently signed act.

Vehicles & Animals opens with "El Salvador", which, according to journalist Gareth Dobson, comes across as a British iteration of Pavement "heading for a quick cuppa in a little cafe with their mates the Super Furry Squeezes". The song's opening resembles the work of the Beta Band, merging folk elements and sound effects. Pott said "El Salvador" is about the band's first year of being on a label and their uplifting "experiences – from going to a dingy studio before we got signed to suddenly touring around Europe and meeting people who work for us trying to sell our records". Like the previous song, "Westside" begins as a quiet piece with a loud chorus, eventually fading out. It was written after witnessing acts who were copying the style of others, evoking "Everything's Not Lost" (2000) by Coldplay. Pott and Roberts used to live in Camden, where they saw people "who were just desperate to be famous".

"One Million" is anchored by reversed drum loops, ending with an electro bass breakdown in the style of Grandaddy. "Shake Those Windows" incorporates country-tinged guitar parts, recalling Synchronicity (1983) by the Police, and deals with music the band members used to listen to. "Beautiful" mixes the styles of the Flaming Lips and Super Furry Animals, with Pott emulating Hamilton Leithauser of the Walkmen. "New Project" deals with religious tolerance; it starts as a piano ballad and ends with radio noise. The Pulp-like song "You Got the Style" talks about the 2001 Oldham riots. The chorus section incorporates a section of "Hot in Herre" (2002) by Nelly. "Vehicles & Animals" was influenced by Pott's nephew, who would frequently play with toy animals, cars and trains, and is followed by "Dungeness", which talks about an outing to the town of the same name. "Out of Nowhere" echoes the work of Beck and includes elements of funk and bossa nova, and is followed by the ballad "You Know".

== Release ==
Following "You Got the Style", "Beautiful" was released as the album's second single on 4 November 2002; it includes the B-side "On and On" and the music video for "Beautiful". The video sees the band walking down a street during night time. On 18 February 2003, Vehicles & Animals was announced for release in two months' time. In the interim, Athlete embarked on a headlining UK tour, which was supported by Longview and Saint Rose, and the band debuted new material. On 24 March 2003, "El Salavador" was released as the album's third single, and was promoted at an in-store performance at the Virgin Megastore in Brighton. Two versions of the song were released on CD; the first includes live versions of "Dungeness" and "You Got the Style", and the music video for "El Salvador"; while the second CD includes "Moving Out" and "Loose Change". The "El Salvador" video revolves around a man in a hospital as he waits and eventually receives facial surgery.

Vehicles & Animals was released on 7 April 2003 through Parlophone. Mikael Wood of Dallas Observer said the artwork "depicts a stairway of trash spiraling toward heaven", alluding to the band's "colorful sound, which cobbles together elements from American and English alt-rock of the past decade". The band promoted the album with an in-store set and a signing session at the Virgin Megastore in London. "Westside" was released as the album's fourth single on 23 May 2003. Two versions were released on CD; the first with the B-side "Count Me In", a remix of "Westside" performed by Elbow, and the music video for "Westside", while the second disc features live versions of "Westside", "Vehicles & Animals" and "One Million". The "Westside" video opens with the band performing in a darkly-lit room, which eventually illuminates to show a vacant warehouse; they continue to perform as they move outside and end up at a beach.

Following this, they appeared at the T in the Park, Move, One Big Sunday and V Festivals. "You Got the Style" was re-released on 22 September 2003. The CD single features a live version of "Beautiful" while the DVD version includes videos of "You Got the Style" and "Westside", and audio tracks "You Got the Style", "Hot Sun Pavement" and a live version of "Westside". The "You Got the Style" video takes place in an empty theatre; Pott is seen reading a book, the illustration in which come to life. In October 2003, the band went on a headlining UK tour, which was followed in January 2004 by a short tour with Snow Patrol. On 18 May 2004, Vehicles & Animals was released in the United States by Astralwerks, with "A Few Differences" and the music video for "You Got the Style" as bonus tracks.

"El Salvador", "Westside", "Beautiful" and "You Got the Style" were included on Athlete's first compilation album Singles 01–10 in 2010. In May 2013, the band embarked on a six-date tour to mark the tenth anniversary of Vehicles & Animals; a live album of recordings from the tour was released the same year.

== Critical reception ==
Professional ratings
Aggregate scores
Source	Rating
Metacritic	63/100
Review scores
Source	Rating
AllMusic	3/5 stars
Cross Rhythms	10/10 stars
The Guardian	4/5 stars
NME	4/10
No Ripcord	6/10
Playlouder	4/5 stars
Pitchfork	6.4/10
Stylus Magazine	5.1/10
Uncut	1/5 stars
Yahoo! Launch	7/10 stars

Vehicles & Animals was met with generally favourable reviews from music critics. At review-aggregating website Metacritic, the album received an average score of 63 based on 17 reviews.

Critics were largely positive to the songwriting. AllMusic reviewer Ned Raggett said Vehicles & Animals is "perfectly, almost aggressively pleasant" and that it "generally makes for a great listen on a lazy, warm afternoon". Petridis called it a "great record" that is "guilelessly cheery and knowingly witty in equal measure". Cross Rhythms founder Tony Cummings praised the "attention-grabbing production" from Vugt as it "bursts of synth, dazzling programming and enough pro-tools wizardry to bring out every wistful note of Joel's poignant vocals". The staff at Time Out complimented the sound's "unapologetic pop sensibility and [...] knack for creative experimentation", calling the album a "gloriously understated and wonderfully consistent" debut release. According to Cam Lindsay of Stylus Magazine, the album stands on the "brink of being quite good" but "it just couldn't make it", coming across as a "bad sugar rush". The staff at Belfast News Letter thought it "show[ed] promise", though if they made another album, they would have to "come up with more of the spine-tingling melodies, catchy hooks and occasional glimpses of rock" that was displayed here. Simon Williams of Playlouder gave the record four out of five, hailing the tracks as "impeccably polished radio-friendly gems", while Lisa Verrico of The Times similarly labelled the album a "British pop gem".

Many reviewers were negative towards the mix of sounds found on the album. BBC Music's Dan Tallis stated that there is an array of "electronic trickery, squelchy noises and kooky beats on display" that hold each track "together seamlessly". The Irish News writer Jason Douglas complimented the experimental nature of the album, and though similar to Gomez, Athlete were "held back by their reliance on odd noises and fuzzy guitars as substitutes for actually doing something new". No Ripcord's Ben Bollig said by attempting to "mix quirky, quiet electronica with beer-swilling pop, without the two informing each other, Athlete too often fall into a formulaic and predictable model". The staff at Uncut said the band's "very amiability begins to grate, as does the fact that, for all their diverse influences, Vehicles And Animals is a wearyingly one-dimensional 45 minutes". Yahoo! Launch writer Ben Gilbert echoed this statement, saying the band are unable to "grasp edge, drama, even depth and soul, with any real nerve, as they plunder a myriad of seemingly incompatible influences". Maya Singer for Cleveland Scene said the "music dances merrily along that narrow line between catchy and cute, clever and precious, accomplished and unbelievably annoying", which the staff at Daily Mirror similarly agreed with.

Some were also negative towards the lyrics. PopMatters said Vehicles & Animals "manages both annoyance and perfection", frequently "sacrific[ing] substantial meaning". According to NME writer Mike Carhart-Harris, the lyrics are "shockingly mundane. Ruminations on childhood innocence are fine ... but find Athlete running on the spot". Pitchfork contributor Johnny Loftus contrasted this by saying the emotions "conveyed are certainly real, but the organi-tronic flower power flow on display here is hardly unique to Athlete".

== Commercial performance ==
Vehicles & Animals peaked at number 19 on the UK Albums chart and by February 2005, it had sold 240,000 copies in the UK. "You Got the Style" reached number 37 in the UK singles chart and at number 41 in Scotland. The re-released version charted at number 42 in the UK. "Beautiful" peaked at number 41 in the UK and at number 49 in Scotland. "El Salvador" reached number 31 in the UK and number 40 in Scotland. "Westside" charted at number 42 in the UK and at number 53 in Scotland.

In 2003, Vehicles & Animals was nominated for the Mercury Music Prize, an annual award honouring the year's best albums from the UK that was ultimately won by Boy in Da Corner by Dizzee Rascal. Q named Vehicles & Animals the 32nd-best album released that year, calling it "the year's best wobbly indie-rock album". In April 2005, the album was certified platinum by the British Phonographic Industry.

== Track listing ==
All songs written by Athlete. All recordings produced by Victor Van Vugt and the band.

No.	Title	Length
1.	"El Salvador"	3:25
2.	"Westside"	4:00
3.	"One Million"	4:17
4.	"Shake Those Windows"	5:04
5.	"Beautiful"	3:47
6.	"New Project"	3:37
7.	"You Got the Style"	3:28
8.	"Vehicles & Animals"	3:52
9.	"Out of Nowhere"	3:11
10.	"Dungeness"	4:17
11.	"You Know"	4:11
12.	"Le Casio"	2:29
Total length:		45:38

== Personnel ==
Personnel per booklet, unless noted otherwise. The band members are intentionally not mentioned in the liner notes.

Athlete

- Joel Pott – vocals, guitar
- Carey Willetts – bass
- Tim Wanstall – keyboard
- Steve Roberts – drums

Additional musicians

- Matt Frost – additional programming (track 9)
- Adam "A Skillz" Mills – additional programming (track 9)

Production

- Victor Van Vugt – producer, mixing
- Pete Collis – engineer (track 2), initial engineer (track 10)
- Bird & Bush – initial production (track 10)
- Athlete – producer, mixing, initial production (track 10)

Artwork

- Blue Source – art direction
- Kam Tang – illustration
- Ali Peck – photography

== Charts ==
=== Weekly charts ===
Weekly chart performance for Vehicles & Animals
Chart (2003)	Peak position
Dutch Alternative Albums (Mega Alternative Top 30)	13
Scottish Albums (Official Charts)	12
UK Albums (Official Charts)	19
Chart (2023)	Peak position
UK Independent Albums (Official Charts)	9

=== Year-end charts ===
Year-end chart performance for Vehicles & Animals
Chart (2003)	Position
UK Albums (OCC)	97
Chart (2005)	Position
UK Albums (OCC)	163

== Certifications ==
Certifications for Vehicles & Animals
Region	Certification	Certified units/sales
United Kingdom (BPI)	Platinum	300,000^{^}
^{^} Shipments figures based on certification alone.
