= Yahoo Music Radio =

Internet radio service

Yahoo! Music
- Developer(s): LAUNCH Media (1999–2002); Yahoo! (2002–2009); CBS Radio (2009–2012) iHeartRadio (2012–2014)
- Initial release: November 11, 1999; 25 years ago (as LAUNCHcast)
- Type: Broadcasting; Internet radio

LAUNCHcast logo used until 2009

Yahoo! Music LAUNCHcast logo used from 2005 to 2009

Yahoo Music player from 2009 to late 2010

LAUNCHcast powered by CBS Radio logo used until September 2009.

Yahoo! Music Radio (formerly known as LAUNCHcast) was an Internet radio service. The service, which featured both an advertising supported free version and a subscription fee-based premium version, allowed users to create personalized Internet radio stations by rating songs selected by a recommender system. Users were also able to listen to music from 150 preset Internet radio stations.

== History ==
The service was developed by Todd Beaupré and Jeff Boulter of LAUNCH Media and debuted on November 11, 1999. In June 2001, after the bursting of the dot-com bubble, the company faced financial difficulty and was acquired by Yahoo! for $12 million, after which it was integrated into Yahoo! Music. At that time, the service had 7.4 million users.

In December 2008, the service was integrated into CBS Radio due to a rise in royalty rates, with CBS taking full control of the service, including advertising and sales and adding compatibility with Firefox and Safari.

The service was integrated into iHeartRadio in June 2012, providing listeners exclusive access to music events such as the iHeartRadio Music Festival. The service was shut down in early 2014 without any announcement.

== Legal issues ==
In January 2003, the company settled a lawsuit with Sony Music over its license covering use of Sony-owned recordings.

On April 27, 2007, Yahoo defeated Sony BMG in a copyright infringement lawsuit involving LAUNCHcast's personalization features. At issue was whether or not LAUNCHcast's "personal radio station" constitutes an "interactive" service, which requires a negotiated license agreement with a record company, or a "non-interactive" service, which requires a cheaper "compulsory license" from SoundExchange. In an "interactive" service, users can play songs on demand, but with LAUNCHcast they can only influence whether or not a particular song appears in their station.

After a six-year litigation, a jury decided that LAUNCHcast was not required to negotiate licenses as an "interactive" service, and that the service's compulsory licenses as a "non-interactive" service were sufficient. The plaintiffs appealed the decision but on August 21, 2009, the United States Court of Appeals for the Second Circuit upheld the lower court's decision, finding that users did not have sufficient control over the playlists generated by LAUNCHcast to render it an "interactive service".

== See also ==
- Yahoo! Music
- AOL Radio
