= Shin Hea-sook =

South Korean figure skater (born 1957)

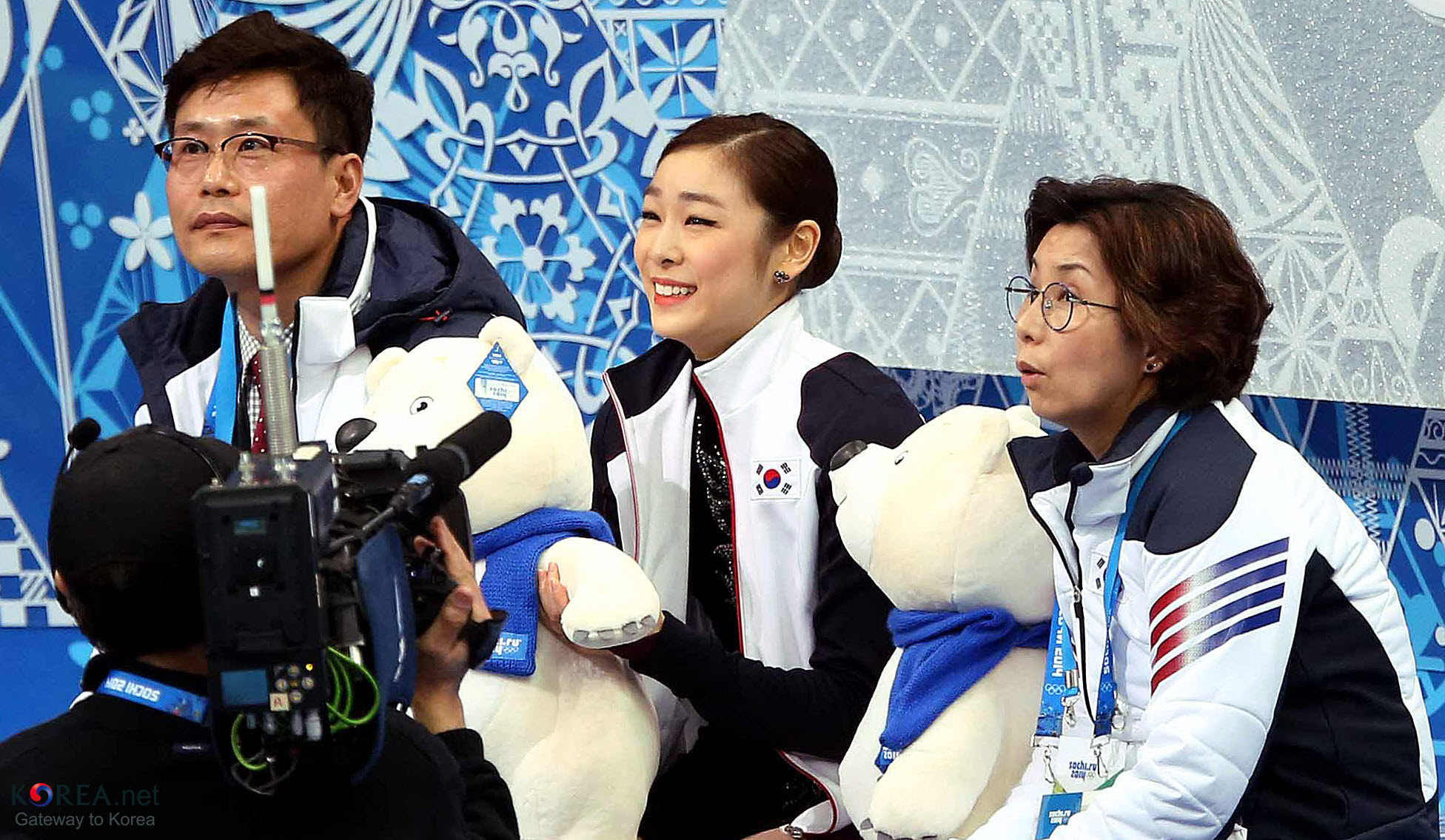
- Shin (far right) at the 2014 Winter Olympics with Yuna Kim (center)

Personal information
- Native name: 신혜숙
- Born: 29 November 1957 (age 68)

Figure skating career
- Country: South Korea
- Began skating: 1969
- Retired: 1980

Shin Hea-sook (born 29 November 1957) is a former competitive South Korean figure skater. She is a two-time South Korean National champion (1979, 1980) and competed in the ladies' singles event at the 1980 Winter Olympics.

== Career ==
Due to the lack of figure skating rinks in South Korea at the time, Shin primarily lived and trained in Japan during her competitive figure skating career. She began coaching in 1984 following her retirement and now coaches in Seoul.

Her current and former students include:

- Kim Se-yol
- Byun Sung-jin
- Chi Hyun-jung
- Choi Da-bin
- Choi Hyung-kyung
- Park Bit-na
- Park Bun-seon
- Lee Dong-won
- Kim Ye-lim
- Shin Yea-ji
- Choi Ji-eun
- Kim Na-young
- Yuna Kim
- Lee Ho-jung
- Kim Hae-jin
- Kwak Min-jeong
- Lee June-hyoung
- Kim Jin-seo
- Cha Jun-hwan
- You Young
- Lee Hae-in
- Kyeong Jae-seok
- Kim Min-chae

== Competitive highlights ==
International
Event	1977–78	1978–79	1979–80
Olympics			20th
World Championships		30th	28th
NHK Trophy		15th	
National
South Korean Champ.	2nd	1st	1st
