= Chi Hyun-jung =

South Korean figure skater (born 1971)

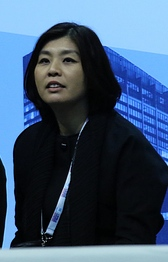
- Chi Hyun-jung at the 2016 World Championships

Personal information
- Native name: 지현정
- Born: December 6, 1971 (age 54)

Figure skating career
- Country: South Korea
- Retired: 1988

- Korean name
- Hangul: 지현정
- Hanja: 池炫靜
- RR: Ji Hyeonjeong
- MR: Chi Hyŏnjŏng

Chi Hyun-jung (Korean: 지현정; born December 6, 1971) is a South Korean former competitive figure skater. She won the silver medal at the 1988 South Korean Championships and competed at two World Championships (1987, 1988). Chi was coached by Shin Hea-sook.

Following her retirement from competitive skating, she became a coach and choreographer.

== Coaching career ==
Chi's current students include:

- Cha Jun-hwan
- Hwang Jeong-yul
- Kim Min-chae
- Lee Hae-in
- Lee Hyo-won
- Lee Jae-keun
- Lim Ju-heon
- Park Eun-bi
- Shin Ji-a
- Yu Dong-han
- Yun Ah-sun

Her former students include:

- An Geon-hyeong
- An So-hyun
- Byun Se-jong
- Choi Da-bin
- Choi Ha-bin
- Huh Ji-yu
- Kim Han-gil
- Kim Chae-yeon
- Kim Hyun-gyeom
- Kim Jin-seo
- Kim Min-seok
- Kim Seo-young
- Kim Yu-jae
- Kim Yu-seong
- Lim Eun-soo
- Yuna Kim
- Kwon Min-sol
- Lee June-hyoung
- Lee Si-won
- Park Se-bin
- Park So-youn
- Park Sung-hoon
- Shin Yea-ji
- You Young
- Youn Seo-jin
- Yu Na-yeong

== Competitive highlights ==
International
Event	1984–85	1985–86	1986–87	1987–88
World Championships			22nd	29th
World Junior Champ.	20th	25th	19th	
National
South Korean Champ.				2nd
