= 2016 South Korean Figure Skating Championships =

Figure skating competition

- Type: National Championship
- Date: January 8 – 10
- Season: 2015–16
- Location: Seoul
- Venue: Mokdong Ice Link

Champions
- Men's singles: Lee June-hyoung
- Ladies' singles: You Young
- Pairs: Ji Min-ji / Themistocles Leftheris
- Ice dance: Rebeka Kim / Kirill Minov
- Previous: 2015 South Korean Figure Skating Championships
- Next: 2017 South Korean Figure Skating Championships

The 2016 South Korean Figure Skating Championships (Korean: 제70회 전국 남녀 피겨스케이팅 종합선수권대회) were held at the Mokdong Ice Rink in Seoul from January 8–10, 2016. Organized by the Korean Skating Union, it was the 70th edition of the event.

Skaters competed in the disciplines of men's singles, ladies' singles, and pair skating on the senior, junior levels, and ice dancing on the senior levels for the title of national champion of South Korea. The results of the national championships were used to choose the Korean teams to the 2016 World Championships and 2016 World Junior Championships.

== Senior results ==
=== Senior men ===
Rank	Name	Total points	SP		FS	
1	Lee June-hyoung	223.72	1	75.10	1	148.62
2	Kim Jin-seo	202.48	2	68.40	2	134.08
3	Cha Jun-hwan	189.98	4	58.60	3	131.38
4	Byun Se-jong	180.74	3	59.89	5	120.85
5	Lee Si-hyeong	174.57	5	51.31	4	123.26
6	An Geon-hyeong	154.50	8	43.41	6	111.09
7	Park Sung-hoon	147.08	6	45.45	7	101.63
8	Lee Dong-won	130.08	7	44.38	8	85.70

=== Senior ladies ===
You Young won the senior ladies' title at the age of 11.

Rank	Name	Total points	SP		FS	
1	You Young	183.75	1	61.09	1	122.66
2	Choi Da-bin	177.29	2	60.32	2	116.97
3	Lim Eun-soo	175.97	4	59.33	3	116.64
4	Kim Ye-lim	173.57	3	59.68	4	113.89
5	Park So-youn	161.07	6	55.34	6	105.73
6	Son Suh-hyun	159.32	12	52.00	5	107.32
7	Kim Ha-nul	158.75	7	54.32	7	104.43
8	Kim Sena	154.70	11	52.55	9	102.15
9	An So-hyun	154.59	8	54.31	10	100.28
10	Byun Ji-hyun	152.83	5	56.95	14	95.88
11	Kim Na-hyun	152.28	17	49.37	8	102.91
12	Lee Seo-young	150.90	10	53.15	12	97.75
13	Park Go-eun	150.68	14	51.08	11	99.60
14	Park Se-bin	148.17	13	51.53	13	96.64
15	Cho Hee-soo	146.19	16	50.41	15	95.78
16	Lim Ah-hyun	143.60	20	48.13	16	95.47
17	Kim Hae-jin	143.31	9	53.39	19	89.92
18	Lee Hyun-Soo	141.10	19	48.42	17	92.68
19	Kwon Ye-na	138.22	18	48.96	20	89.26
20	Jeon Gyo-hee	137.80	22	46.91	18	90.89
21	Jeon Se-hee	130.87	15	50.83	24	80.04
22	To Ji-hun	128.10	21	47.08	22	81.02
23	Choi Yu-jin	126.83	24	45.12	21	81.71
24	Yun Sun-min	126.80	23	46.21	23	80.59
Did not advance to free skating
25	Park Chea-young	44.03	25	44.03	—N/a	
26	Kim Su-hyun	43.11	26	43.11	—N/a	
27	Choi Hwi	42.92	27	42.92	—N/a	
28	Yoon Min-seo	41.21	28	41.21	—N/a	
29	Lee Yeon-su	40.03	29	40.03	—N/a	
30	Yoon Eun-su	38.73	30	38.73	—N/a	
31	Cho Yu-bin	38.35	31	38.35	—N/a	
32	Lee Ji-Yun	35.67	32	35.67	—N/a	
33	Im So-yeon	34.89	33	34.89	—N/a	
34	Choi Won-hee	33.06	34	33.06	—N/a	
35	Youn Ha-rim	32.91	35	32.91	—N/a	
WD	Chea Song-joo	withdrew	withdrew from competition			
WD	Jang Hyun-su	withdrew	withdrew from competition			
WD	Kim Tae-kyung	withdrew	withdrew from competition			

=== Senior pairs ===
Rank	Name	Total points	SP		FS	
1	Ji Min-ji / Themistocles Leftheris	135.24	1	46.07	1	89.17

=== Senior ice dance ===
Rank	Name	Total points	SD		FD	
1	Rebeka Kim / Kirill Minov	138.00	1	55.43	1	82.57
2	Min Yura / Alexander Gamelin	127.18	2	53.05	2	74.13
3	Lee Ho-jung / Richard Kang-in Kam	121.02	3	51.26	3	69.76

== Junior results ==
=== Junior men ===
Rank	Name	Total points	SP		FS	
1	Kim Sang-woo	126.76	1	43.14	1	83.62
2	Kim Han-gil	116.12	2	37.75	2	78.37
3	Kim Tae-hyun	86.96	3	32.09	3	54.87

=== Junior ladies ===
Rank	Name	Total points	SP		FS	
1	Kam Yun-kyung	157.43	1	53.17	1	104.26
2	Jeon Su-Been	135.72	3	46.11	2	89.61
3	Kim Na-yeong	130.94	2	50.44	7	80.50
4	Park Mi-sun	126.58	4	45.32	6	81.26
5	Kim Bo-young	125.87	6	44.27	5	81.60
6	Noh Chae-eun	125.41	9	41.26	3	84.15
7	Lee Ji-won	124.46	8	42.07	4	82.39
8	Jung You-jin	122.34	5	44.81	9	77.53
9	Choi Hyun-soo	114.72	18	36.76	8	77.96
10	Lee Min-young	112.55	7	42.15	13	70.40
11	Kang Soo-min	112.29	16	37.69	10	74.60
12	Bae Min-ji	111.20	10	40.85	14	70.35
13	Park In-young	111.15	13	38.33	11	72.82
14	Yu Seung-been	109.20	12	38.64	12	70.56
15	Byun Yeo-jin	105.79	22	35.84	15	69.95
16	Ko Eun-bi	105.54	20	36.40	16	69.14
17	Bang Jee-won	103.62	14	37.93	17	65.69
18	Yoon Seo-young	103.02	11	38.99	19	64.03
19	Kim Gyu-ri	102.44	15	37.84	18	64.60
20	Jeon Yi-been	100.38	19	36.55	20	63.83
21	Kim Chae-young	96.79	24	35.18	21	61.61
22	Park So-yeon	90.95	23	35.56	22	55.39
23	Kim Do-eun	89.67	17	36.95	23	52.72
24	Ko Soon-jung	87.14	21	36.21	24	50.93
Did not advance to free skating
25	Sung Da-eun	35.12	25	35.12	—N/a	
26	Jang Eun-sol	34.80	26	34.80	—N/a	
27	Song Ji-hyun	34.51	27	34.51	—N/a	
28	Kim Ye-jin	34.27	28	34.27	—N/a	
29	Son Ha-eun	33.95	29	33.95	—N/a	
30	Lee Tae-yeon	33.53	30	33.53	—N/a	
31	Kim Han-seul	32.87	31	32.87	—N/a	
32	Kim Do-hyeon	32.11	32	32.11	—N/a	
33	Jeong Ji-yun	31.87	33	31.87	—N/a	
34	Lee Sae-rom	31.87	34	31.87	—N/a	
35	Lee Eun-seo	30.52	35	30.52	—N/a	
36	Kim Ju-eun	30.30	36	30.30	—N/a	
37	Kim Jin-seo	30.22	37	30.22	—N/a	
38	Kim Hyun-soo	30.07	38	30.07	—N/a	
39	Park Sa-rang	30.01	39	30.01	—N/a	
40	Choi Da-hye	29.90	40	29.90	—N/a	
41	Sung Su-zi	29.12	41	29.12	—N/a	
42	Lee Da-hyun	27.97	42	27.97	—N/a	
43	Kim Ga-eun	27.89	43	27.89	—N/a	
44	Yang Si-jin	26.29	44	26.29	—N/a	
WD	Kim Do-yeon	withdrew	withdrew from competition			
WD	Lee Si-won	withdrew	withdrew from competition			
WD	Seo Ho-min	withdrew	withdrew from competition			

=== Junior pairs ===
Rank	Name	Total points	SP		FS	
1	Kim Su-yeon / Kim Hyung-tae	98.63	1	35.35	1	63.28

== International team selections ==
=== World Championships ===
	Men	Ladies	Ice dancing
1	Lee June-hyoung	Choi Da-bin	Rebeka Kim / Kirill Minov
2	—N/a	Park So-youn	—N/a

=== Four Continents Championships ===
Based on the results of the 2015 KSU President Cup Ranking Competition from December 4–6, 2015.

	Men	Ladies	Ice dancing
1	Kim Jin-seo	Choi Da-bin	Rebeka Kim / Kirill Minov
2	Lee June-hyoung	Park So-youn	Lee Ho-jung / Richard Kang-in Kam
3	Byun Se-jong	Kim Na-hyun	Min Yura / Alexander Gamelin

=== World Junior Championships ===
	Men	Ladies	Ice dancing
1	Cha Jun-hwan	Son Suh-hyun	Lee Ho-jung / Richard Kang-in Kam
2	Byun Se-jong	Kim Ha-nul	—N/a

=== Winter Youth Olympics ===
Based on the results of the 2015 KSU President Cup Ranking Competition from December 4–6, 2015.

	Men	Ladies	Pairs
1	Cha Jun-hwan	Byun Ji-hyun	Kim Su-yeon / Kim Hyung-tae
