= Huh Ji-yu =

South Korean figure skater (born 2011)

Personal information
- Other names: Jiyu Huh; Heo Ji-yu
- Born: September 15, 2011 (age 15) Seoul, South Korea
- Home town: Seoul, South Korea
- Height: 1.56 m (5 ft 1 in)

Figure skating career
- Country: South Korea
- Coach: Choi Hyung-kyung; Kim Na-hyun; Kim Min-seok
- Began skating: 2019
Medal record
Figure skating: Women's singles
Representing South Korea
South Korean Championships
Bronze medal – third place	2026 Seoul	Women's singles

Korean name
- Hangul: 허지유
- RR: Heo Jiyu
- MR: Hŏ Chiyu

Huh Ji-yu (Korean: 허지유; born September 15, 2011) is a South Korean figure skater. She is the 2026 South Korean national bronze medalist and the 2025 JGP Latvia silver medalist.

== Personal life ==
Huh Ji-yu was born on September 15, 2011 in Seoul, South Korea. She has a brother who is eight years younger than her.

She currently takes online classes from Laurel Springs School, a U.S.-based institution. In addition to figure skating, she also enjoys knitting.

Huh looks up to Yuna Kim, Shin Ji-a, Mone Chiba, Ami Nakai, and Rika Kihira.

== Career ==
=== Early years ===
Huh began learning how to skate in 2019 after visiting an ice rink with her first grade classmates. She was inspired to pursue the sport competitively after the 2020 Four Continents Championships as a spectator. Her first figure skating coach was Song Yeo-jin. Wanting Huh to train in a more competitive environment, Song encouraged Huh to join Chi Hyun-jung's group of skaters at the Taereung National Training Center following the end of the COVID-19 pandemic.

Huh made her international debut on the advanced novice level at the 2024 Asian Open Trophy, winning the silver medal. A couple months following that, Huh placed eighth on the senior level at the 2025 South Korean Championships.

=== 2025–26: Junior international debut and National bronze medal ===
Huh finished fourth at the 2025 South Korean Junior Grand Prix Qualifiers and was given two Junior Grand Prix assignments. On the Junior Grand Prix series, Huh won the silver medal at 2025 JGP Latvia behind Mei Okada. Going on to compete at 2025 JGP United Arab Emirates, Huh had a disappointing short program where she popped her planned double Axel into a single and failed to perform her planned triple Lutz-triple toe combination, only placing nineteenth in that segment. She rebounded with a stronger free skate, placing sixth in that segment to move up to twelfth place overall.

In January, Huh moved up to the senior level to compete at the 2026 South Korean Championships. At the event, she placed third in the short program and fourth in the free skate to capture the bronze medal overall behind Shin Ji-a and Kim Yu-seong.

Selected to compete at the 2026 World Junior Championships in Tallinn, Estonia, Huh placed tenth in the short program and ninth in the free skate to finish in seventh place overall. She was the highest ranking South Korean women's singles skater at the event. "I was happy with my skate, but not so much with the score. They were very strict," Huh shared following her free skate. "I was very nervous and sometimes I thought, can I really do this? But I really wanted to have fun and not think too much, just focus on my programs. I think my head was maybe not super confident, but my body was confident."

=== 2026–27 season ===
Huh opened her season by competing at the 2026 South Korean Junior Grand Prix Qualifiers in July, where she won the bronze medal. With this placement, she was given two Junior Grand Prix assignments.

In early August, it was announced that Huh had made a coaching change, having left coaches, Chi Hyun-jung and Ji Min-ji to begin training under Choi Hyung-kyung, Kim Na-hyun, and Kim Min-seok.

Huh was sixth after the short program at the 2026 JGP Bangkok. She fell once and popped three jumps in her free skate, finishing twelfth in that segment and eleventh overall. She withdrew from her second assignment, the JGP Batumi.

== Programs ==
Season	Short program	Free skating
2026–2027	Fouquet's by André Charlier & Benoît Sourisse; Lover Girl by Laufey choreo. by Stéphane Lambiel	Astor Piazzolla Medley; Tzigane Tango performed by Dai Miyata, Atsushi Yamanaka, & Kazuma Miura; Libertango performed by LAYERS CLASSIC choreo. by Misha Ge
2025–2026	Sentimental Journey; I'm Looking Over a Four Leaf Clover performed by Emmy Rossum choreo. by Stéphane Lambiel	Flower Through Concrete by Chloe Flower choreo. by Misha Ge
2024–2025	Czárdás by Vittorio Monti performed by Angèle Dubeau & La Pietà	Tirol Concerto for Piano and Orchestra by Philip Glass performed by Dennis Russell Davies & Stuttgart Chamber Orchestra
2023–2024	Czárdás by Vittorio Monti performed by Angèle Dubeau & La Pietà	Micmacs; Droit de cité; Larrons en foire; Ça déroule by Raphaël Beau; The Big Sleep by Max Steiner performed by Charles Gerhardt & National Philharmonic Orchestra
2022–2023	Attesa by Jackie Evancho	Carmen, Act 1 - L'Amour est un Oiseau Rebelle (Remix) (from Emily in Paris) performed by The Math Club

== Competitive highlights ==
- JGP – Event of the ISU Junior Grand Prix Series
- TBD – Assigned

Competition placements at senior level
Season	2024–25	2025–26
South Korean Championships	8th	3rd

Competition placements at junior level
Season	2025–26	2026–27
World Junior Championships	7th	
JGP Latvia	2nd	
JGP Thailand		11th
JGP United Arab Emirates	12th	
JGP Georgia		WD
