= Jung Sung-il (figure skater) =

South Korean figure skater (born 1969)

Personal information
- Born: October 21, 1969 (age 56)
- Height: 1.73 m (5 ft 8 in)

Figure skating career
- Country: South Korea
- Retired: 1996
Medal record
Men's figure skating
Representing South Korea
Universiade
Silver medal – second place	1991 Sapporo	Singles

- Jung Sung-il
- Hangul: 정성일
- Hanja: 鄭星佚
- RR: Jeong Seongil
- MR: Chŏng Sŏngil

Jung Sung-il (October 21, 1969) is a South Korean retired competitive figure skater. He is the 1991 Winter Universiade silver medalist. He placed as high as sixth at the World Junior Championships (1988) and 14th at the World Championships (1991). A three-time Olympian, he placed 22nd at the 1988 Winter Olympics, 21st at the 1992 Winter Olympics, and 17th at the 1994 Winter Olympics.

Following his retirement from competitive skating in 1996, Jung became a coach. His former students include Choi Young-eun and Lee Dong-whun.

From 2003 to 2010, Jung toured with Disney on Ice's "100 Years of Magic" show. In 2010, he returned to South Korea to work as a coach.

== Competitive highlights ==
International
Event	83–84	85–86	86–87	87–88	88–89	89–90	90–91	91–92	92–93	93–94	94–95
Olympics				22nd				21st		17th	
Worlds					22nd	15th	14th		20th	20th	
NHK Trophy				4th		5th	9th		4th	9th	7th
Skate America							10th				
Universiade							2nd				
International: Junior
Junior Worlds	15th	8th	18th	6th							
National
South Korean											
J = Junior level
