= South Korean Figure Skating Championships =

- Status: Active
- Genre: National championships
- Frequency: Annual
- Country: South Korea
- Organized by: Korea Skating Union

The South Korean Figure Skating Championships (Korean: 한국 피겨스케이팅 선수권 대회) are an annual figure skating competition organized by the Korea Skating Union to crown the national champions of South Korea. Medals are awarded in men's singles, women's singles, pair skating, and ice dance at the senior, junior, and novice levels, although not every discipline is held every year due to a lack of participants.

== Senior medalists ==
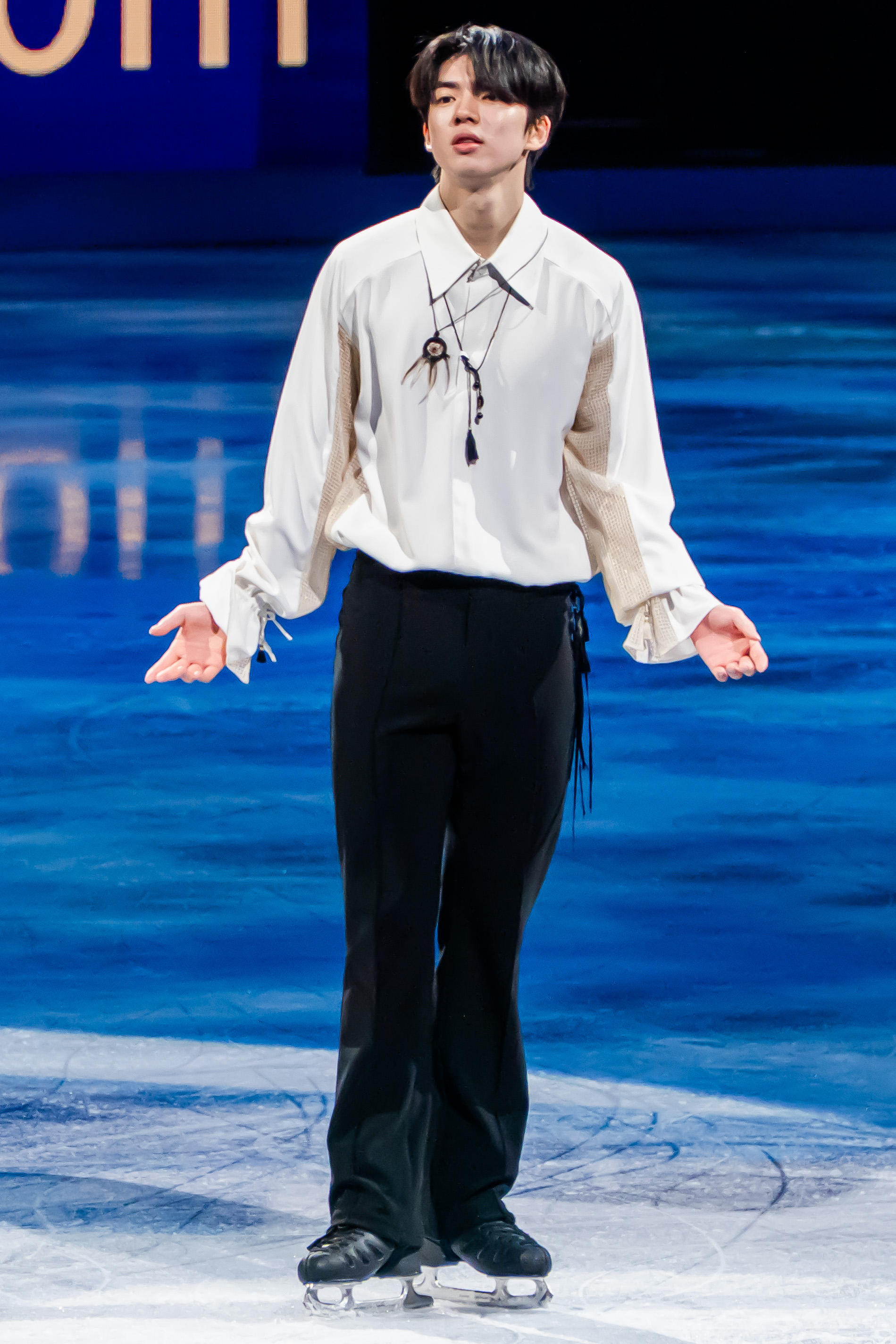
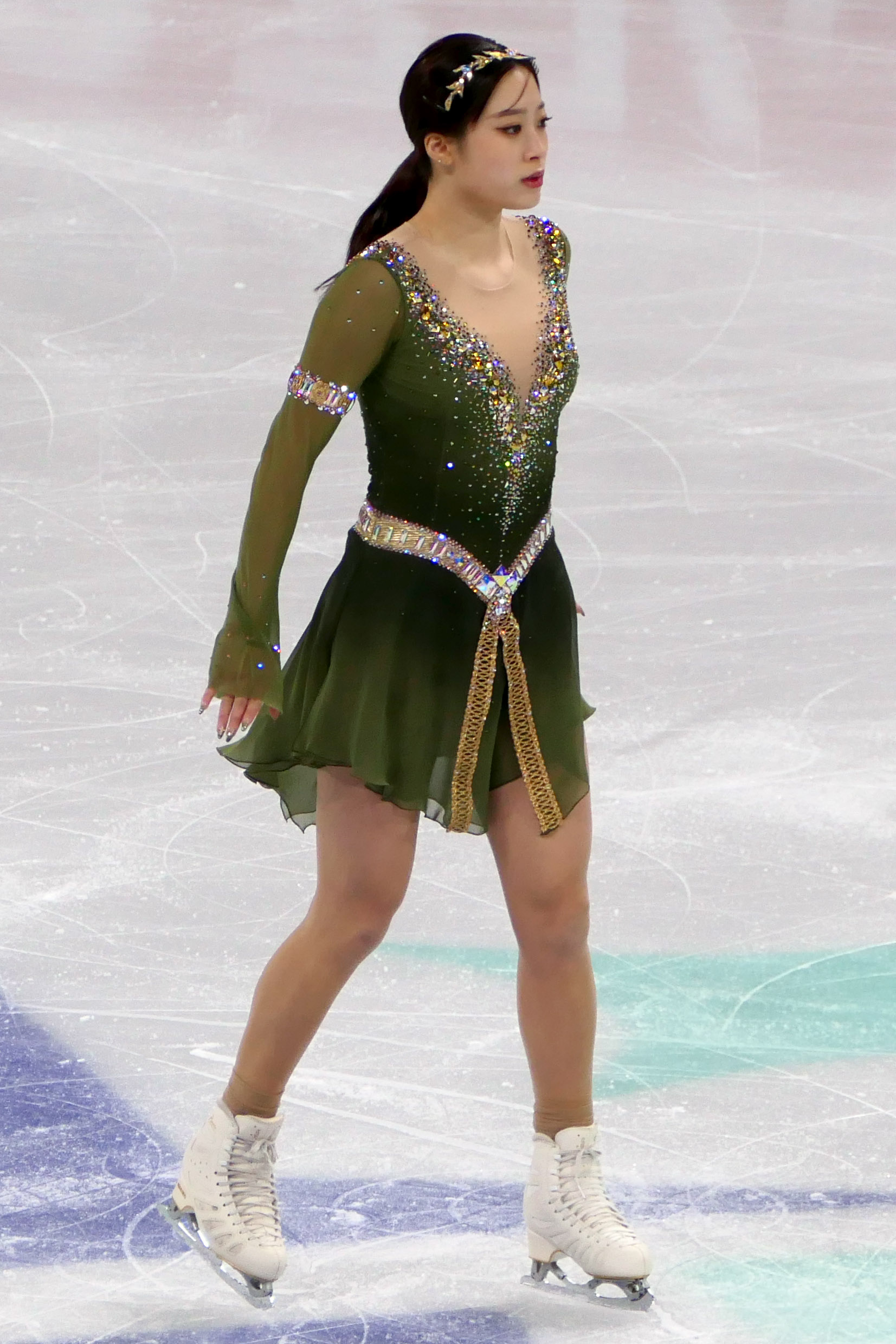
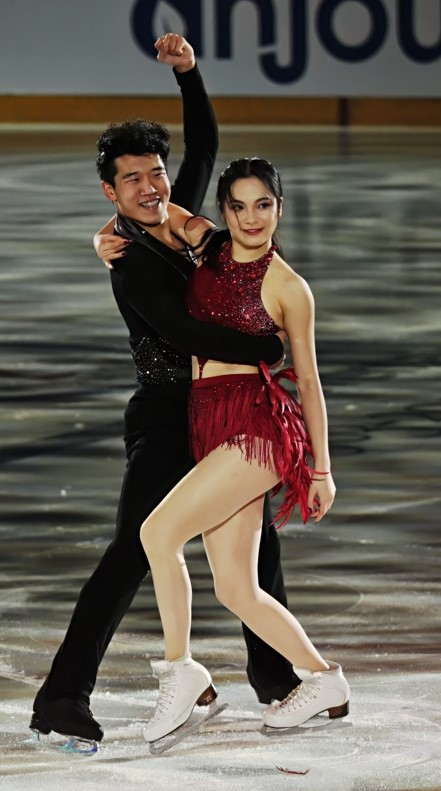
From left to right: Cha Jun-hwan, ten-time South Korean champion in men's singles; You Young, five-time South Korean champion in women's singles; and Hannah Lim and Ye Quan, three-time South Korean champions in ice dance

=== Men's singles ===
Men's event medalists
Year	Location	Gold	Silver	Bronze	Ref.
1955	Hwacheon	Lee Myung	Kim Jong-shik	No other competitors	
1956	Yeoncheon	Lee Hae-jeong	Lee Yoo-sung	Bang Myung-seok	
1957	Seoul	Oh Kyung-hak	Lee Hae-jeong		
1958	Cheorwon	Oh Kyung-hak	Yang Du-shik	Lee Yoo-sung	
1959	Yeoncheon	Yang Du-shik	Lee Yoo-sung	Ji Jeol-un	
1960	Seoul	Yang Du-shik	Ji Jeol-un		
1961	Seoul	Ji Jeol-un			
1962	Seoul	No men's competitors			
1963	Seoul	Ji Jeol-un	Ko Yong-heum	Shin Keon-jo	
1964	Seoul	Ko Yong-heum	Ji Jeol-un	Shin Keon-jo	
1965	Seoul	Ko Yong-heum	Lee Kwang-young	No other competitors	
1966–67	Seoul	No men's competitors			
1968	Seoul	Lee Kwang-young	No other competitors		
1969	Seoul	Lee Kwang-young	No other competitors		
1970	Seoul	No men's competitors			
1971	Seoul	Kim Hoon	No other competitors		
1972–74	Seoul	No men's competitors			
1975	Seoul	Han Soo-bong	No other competitors		
1976	Seoul	No men's competitors			
1977	Seoul	Han Soo-bong	No other competitors		
1978	Seoul	Han Soo-bong	No other competitors		
1979–82	Seoul	No men's competitors			
1983	Seoul	Cho Jae-hyung			
1984–86	Seoul	No men's competitors			
1987	Seoul	Jung Sung-il			
1988–89	Seoul	No men's competitors			
1990	Seoul	Jung Sung-il			
1991	Seoul	No men's competitors			
1992	Seoul	Jung Sung-il	Kim Se-yol		
1993	Seoul	No men's competitors			
1994	Seoul	Jung Sung-il	Lee Kyu-hyun		
1995	Seoul	Jung Sung-il	Lee Kyu-hyun	Kim Se-jin	
1996	Seoul	Lee Kyu-hyun	No other competitors		
1997	Seoul	Lee Kyu-hyun	Jin Yun-ki	No other competitors	
1998	Seoul	Lee Kyu-hyun	No other competitors		
1999	Seoul	Lee Kyu-hyun	No other competitors		
2000	Seoul	Lee Kyu-hyun	No other competitors		
2001	Seoul	Lee Kyu-hyun	Lee Dong-whun	Kim Do-hwan	
2002	Seoul	Lee Kyu-hyun	No other competitors		
2003	Seoul	Lee Kyu-hyun	Lee Dong-whun	No other competitors	
2004	Seoul	Lee Dong-whun	Cha Sang-chan	Choi In-hwa	
2005	Seoul	Lee Dong-whun	No other competitors		
2006	Seoul	Lee Dong-whun	No other competitors		
2007	Seoul	Lee Dong-whun	No other competitors		
2008	Goyang	Lee Dong-whun	No other competitors		
2009	Goyang	Kim Min-seok	Cha Oh-reum	Lee Dong-whun	
2010	Seoul	Kim Min-seok	Lee Dong-won	No other competitors	
2011	Seoul	Lee Dong-won	Kim Min-seok	Lee June-hyoung	
2012	Seoul	Kim Jin-seo	Lee June-hyoung	Kim Min-seok	
2013	Seoul	Lee June-hyoung	Kim Jin-seo	Lee Dong-won	
2014	Goyang	Kim Jin-seo	Lee June-hyoung	Lee Dong-won	
2015	Seoul	Lee June-hyoung	Kim Jin-seo	Cha Jun-hwan	
2016	Seoul	Lee June-hyoung	Kim Jin-seo	Cha Jun-hwan	
2017	Gangneung	Cha Jun-hwan	Kim Jin-seo	Lee Si-hyeong	
2018	Seoul	Cha Jun-hwan	Kim Jin-seo	Lee June-hyoung	
2019	Seoul	Cha Jun-hwan	Lee June-hyoung	Lee Si-hyeong	
2020	Uijeongbu	Cha Jun-hwan	Lee Si-hyeong	Lee June-hyoung	
2021	Uijeongbu	Cha Jun-hwan	Lee Si-hyeong	Cha Young-hyun	
2022	Uijeongbu	Cha Jun-hwan	Lee Si-hyeong	Kyeong Jae-seok	
2023	Uijeongbu	Cha Jun-hwan	Kim Hyun-gyeom	Seo Min-kyu	
2024	Uijeongbu	Cha Jun-hwan	Lee Si-hyeong	Seo Min-kyu	
2025	Uijeongbu	Cha Jun-hwan	Seo Min-kyu	Lee Si-hyeong	
2026	Seoul	Cha Jun-hwan	Seo Min-kyu	Choi Ha-bin	

=== Women's singles ===
Women's event medalists
Year	Location	Gold	Silver	Bronze	Ref.
1955	Hwacheon	Hong Yong-myung	Cho Jung-keun	No other competitors	
1956	Yeoncheon	Hong Yong-myung	Cho Jung-keun	Kim Jung-ja	
1957	Seoul	Cho Jung-keun			
1958	Cheorwon	Cho Jung-keun	Kim Jung-ja	Won Mun-hee	
1959	Yeoncheon	Cho Jung-keun	Lee Deok-hee	Won Mun-hee	
1960	Seoul	Kim Jung-ja	Lee Deok-hee		
1961	Seoul	Kim Jung-ja			
1963	Seoul	Jung Nam-ok	Lee Deok-hee	Kim Hae-kyung	
1964	Seoul	Jung Nam-ok	Kim Hae-kyung	Lee Deok-hee	
1965	Seoul	Kim Hae-kyung	Jung Nam-ok	Lee Hyun-joo	
1967	Seoul	Lee Hyun-joo	Kim Hae-kyung		
1968	Seoul	Lee Hyun-joo	Kim Hae-kyung	Kim Young-hee	
1969	Seoul	Lee Hyun-joo	Yun Hyo Jean (Jean Yun)	Kim Young-hee	
1971	Seoul	Chang Myung-su	Lee In-sook	Yun Hyo Jean (Jean Yun)	
1972	Seoul	Chang Myung-su	Lee Bu-yong		
1974	Seoul	Chang Myung-su	Yun Hyo Jean (Jean Yun)	Lee In-sook	
1975	Seoul	Yun Hyo Jean (Jean Yun)	Lee Hyun-joo	Hong Hye-kyung	
1976	Seoul	Yun Hyo Jean (Jean Yun)	Lee Hyun-joo	Hong Hye-kyung	
1977	Seoul	Lee Hyun-joo	Yun Hyo Jean (Jean Yun)	Choo Young-soon	
1978	Seoul	Choo Young-soon	Shin Hea-sook	Lee Bu-yong	
1979	Seoul	Shin Hea-sook	Choo Young-soon	Lim Hye-kyung	
1980	Seoul	Shin Hea-sook	Choo Young-soon	Yun Hyo Jean (Jean Yun)	
1981	Seoul	Lim Hye-kyung			
1982	Seoul	Lim Hye-kyung			
1983	Seoul	Lim Hye-kyung			
1984	Seoul	Kim Hae-sung	Lim Hye-kyung		
1986	Seoul	Byun Sung-jin			
1987	Seoul	Byun Sung-jin	Ko Sung-hee		
1988	Seoul	Byun Sung-jin	Chi Hyun-jung	Ko sung-hee	
1989	Seoul	Byun Sung-jin			
1990	Seoul	Lee Eun-hee	Byun Sung-jin		
1992	Seoul	Lee Eun-hee			
1994	Seoul	Park Bun-seon	Kim Hee-jin		
1995	Seoul	Park Bun-seon, Choi Hyung-kyung			
1997	Seoul	Jung Min-ju	Choi Hyung-kyung	Park Bun-seon	
1998	Seoul	Shin Yea-ji (Note: This is Shin Yea-ji, the figure skater born in 1984.)		Choi Young-eun	
1999	Seoul	Shin Yea-ji		Lee Chu-hong	
2000	Seoul	Park Bit-na	Lee Chu-hong		
2001	Seoul	Park Bit-na	Jung Min-ju	Lee Chu-hong	
2002	Seoul	Shin Yea-ji	Lee Sun-bin	Choi Young-eun	
2003	Seoul	Yuna Kim	Park Bit-na	Choi Ji-eun	
2004	Seoul	Yuna Kim	Park Bit-na	Choi Ji-eun	
2005	Seoul	Yuna Kim	Choi Ji-eun	Kim Chae-hwa	
2006	Seoul	Yuna Kim	Choi Ji-eun	Shin Yea-ji (Note: This is Shin Yea-ji, the figure skater born in 1988.)	
2007	Seoul	Kim Chae-hwa	Shin Yea-ji	Choi Ji-eun	
2008	Goyang	Kim Na-young	Kim Hyeon-jung	Kim Chae-hwa	
2009	Goyang	Yuna Kim	Kim Na-young	Yoon Yea-ji	
2010	Seoul	Kim Hae-jin	Kwak Min-jeong	Park So-youn	
2011	Seoul	Kim Hae-jin	Park So-youn	Kwak Min-jeong	
2012	Seoul	Kim Hae-jin	Park So-youn	Choi Da-bin	
2013	Seoul	Yuna Kim	Park So-youn	Choi Da-bin	
2014	Goyang	Yuna Kim	Park So-youn	Kim Hae-jin	
2015	Seoul	Park So-youn	Choi Da-bin	An So-hyun	
2016	Seoul	You Young	Choi Da-bin	Lim Eun-soo	
2017	Gangneung	Lim Eun-soo	Kim Ye-lim	Kim Na-hyun	
2018	Seoul	You Young	Choi Da-bin	Lim Eun-soo	
2019	Seoul	You Young	Lim Eun-soo	Lee Hae-in	
2020	Uijeongbu	You Young	Lee Hae-in	Kim Ye-lim	
2021	Uijeongbu	Kim Ye-lim	Yun Ah-sun	Lee Hae-in	
2022	Uijeongbu	You Young	Kim Ye-lim	Lee Hae-in	
2023	Uijeongbu	Shin Ji-a	Kim Ye-lim	Lee Hae-in	
2024	Uijeongbu	Shin Ji-a	Lee Hae-in	Kim Chae-yeon	
2025	Uijeongbu	Kim Chae-yeon	Shin Ji-a	Kim Yu-jae	
2026	Seoul	Shin Ji-a	Kim Yu-seong	Huh Ji-yu	

=== Pairs ===
Pairs event medalists
Year	Location	Gold	Silver	Bronze	Ref.
2001–15	No pairs competitors				
2016	Seoul	Ji Min-ji; Themistocles Leftheris	No other competitors		
2017	Gangneung	Ji Min-ji; Themistocles Leftheris	Kim Su-yeon; Kim Hyung-tae	Kim Kyu-eun; Alex Kam	
2018	Seoul	Kim Kyu-eun; Alex Kam	No other competitors		
2019–22	No pairs competitors				
2023	Uijeongbu	Cho Hye-jin; Steven Adcock	No other competitors		
2024–26	No pairs competitors				

=== Ice dance ===
Ice dance event medalists
Year	Location	Gold	Silver	Bronze	Ref.
1998	Seoul	Yang Tae-hwa; Lee Chuen-gun	Kim Hye-min; Kim Min-woo	No other competitors	
1999	Seoul	Yang Tae-hwa; Lee Chuen-gun	Kim Hye-min; Kim Min-woo	No other competitors	
2000	Seoul	Yang Tae-hwa; Lee Chuen-gun	Kim Hye-min; Kim Min-woo	No other competitors	
2001	Seoul	Yang Tae-hwa; Lee Chuen-gun	Kim Hye-min; Kim Min-woo	No other competitors	
2002	Seoul	Yang Tae-hwa; Lee Chuen-gun	Kim Hye-min; Kim Min-woo	No other competitors	
2003	Seoul	Kim Hye-min; Kim Min-woo	Choi Sun-young; Lee Kyu-chui	No other competitors	
2004	Seoul	Kim Hye-min; Kim Min-woo	Choi Sun-young; Lee Kyu-chui	No other competitors	
2005	Seoul	Kim Hye-min; Kim Min-woo	No other competitors		
2006	Seoul	Kim Hye-min; Kim Min-woo	No other competitors		
2006–13	No ice dance competitors				
2014	Goyang	Yura Min; Timothy Koleto	No other competitors		
2015	Seoul	No ice dance competitors			
2016	Seoul	Rebeka Kim; Kirill Minov	Yura Min; Alexander Gamelin	Lee Ho-jung; Richard Kam	
2017	Gangneung	Yura Min; Alexander Gamelin	Lee Ho-jung; Richard Kam	No other competitors	
2018	Seoul	Yura Min; Alexander Gamelin	No other competitors		
2019	Seoul	No ice dance competitors			
2020	Uijeongbu	Yura Min; Daniel Eaton	No other competitors		
2021–23	Uijeongbu	No ice dance competitors			
2024	Uijeongbu	Hannah Lim; Ye Quan	No other competitors		
2025	Uijeongbu	Hannah Lim; Ye Quan	No other competitors		
2026	Seoul	Hannah Lim; Ye Quan	No other competitors		

== Junior medalists ==
=== Men's singles ===
Junior men's event medalists
Year	Location	Gold	Silver	Bronze	Ref.
2007	Seoul	Kim Min-seok	Cha Oh-reum	Lee Dong-won	
2008	Goyang	Kim Min-seok	Cha Oh-reum	Lee Dong-won	
2009	Goyang	Lee Dong-won	Lee June-hyoung	Seo Min-seok	
2010	Seoul	Lee June-hyoung	Seo Min-seok	No other competitors	
2011	Seoul	Kim Jin-seo	Alex Kam	Kim Hwan-jin	
2012	Seoul	Cha Jun-hwan	Alex Kam	Richard Kam	
2013	Seoul	Cha Jun-hwan	Richard Kam	Lee Si-hyeong	
2014	Goyang	Richard Kam	Park Sung-hoon	An Geon-hyeong	
2015	Seoul	Kim Hyung-tae	Kim Sang-woo	Kim Geon-mo	
2016	Seoul	Kim Sang-woo	Kim Han-gil	Kim Tae-hyun	
2017	Gangneung	Cha Young-hyun	Kyeong Jae-Seok	Kim Sang-woo	
2018	Seoul	Kim Han-gil	Kim Hyun	Park Geon-woo	
2019	Seoul	Lee Dong-hyuk	Jeong Deok-hoon	Kim Jae-hyeon	
2020	Uijeongbu	Jeong Deok-hoon	Lee Jun-hyuk	Kim Hyun-gyeom	
2021	Uijeongbu	Lee Jun-hyuk	Park Hyeon-seo	Kim Ye-sung	
2022	Uijeongbu	Seo Min-kyu	Park Hyeon-seo	Kim Ye-sung	
2023	Uijeongbu	Choi Ha-bin	Park Hyeon-seo	Kim Ye-sung	
2024	Uijeongbu	Yu Dong-han	Chung Jae-wook	Kim Tae-hwan	
2025	Uijeongbu	Lee Youn-ho	Kim Aa-ron	Kim Ye-sung	
2026	Seoul	Kim Ye-sung	Hwang Gyu-jin	Kim Tae-hwan	

=== Women's singles ===
Junior women's event medalists
Year	Location	Gold	Silver	Bronze	Ref.
2007	Seoul	Kim Na-young	Kim Hyeon-jung	Kim Soo-jin	
2008	Goyang	Yun Yea-ji	Kwak Min-jeong	Kim Soo-jin	
2009	Goyang	Kwak Min-jeong	Park So-yeon	Kim Hye-rin	
2010	Seoul	Lee Ho-jung	Seo Chae-yeon	Kim Hye-rin	
2011	Seoul	Cho Kyung-ah	Choi Hwi	Byun Ji-hyun	
2012	Seoul	Kim Na-hyun	Kim Kyu-eun	Kim Ju-hee	
2013	Seoul	Cho Kyung-ah	Choi Min Jee	Lim Ah-hyun	
2014	Goyang	An So-hyun	Choi Yu-jin	Cho Kyung-ah	
2015	Seoul	Lee Hyun-soo	Do Ji-hoon	Kang Su-min	
2016	Seoul	Kam Yun-kyung	Jeon Su-been	Kim Na-yeong	
2017	Gangneung	Choi So-eun	Choi Hyun-su	Lee Yu-rim	
2018	Seoul	Wi Seo-young	Lee Si-won	Lee Eun-seo	
2019	Seoul	Park Yeon-jeong	Kim Min-chae	Kwak Mun-ju	
2020	Uijeongbu	Seo Hee-won	Song Si-woo	Kang Joo-ha	
2021	Uijeongbu	Shin Ji-a	Han Hee-sue	Song Si-woo	
2022	Uijeongbu	Kwon Min-sol	Kim Yu-jae	Hwang Ji-young	
2023	Uijeongbu	Kim Yu-seong	Lee Ji-yoon	Kim Ye-eun	
2024	Uijeongbu	Jang Ha-rin	Lee Ji-yoon	Kim Ji-yu	
2025	Uijeongbu	Lee Gyu-ri	Lee Hyo-won	Kim Min-song	
2026	Seoul	Choi Jin-a	Jeon Hyo-eun	Park Gyu-gyung	

=== Pairs ===
Junior pairs event medalists
Year	Location	Gold	Silver	Bronze	Ref.
2007–15	No junior pairs competitors				
2016	Seoul	Kim Su-yeon; Kim Hyung-tae	No other competitors		
2017–25	No junior pairs competitors since 2016				

=== Ice dance ===
Junior ice dance event medalists
Year	Location	Gold	Silver	Bronze	Ref.
2007–12	No junior ice dance competitors				
2013	Seoul	Kim Ji-won; Oh Jae-woong	No other competitors		
2014	Goyang	No junior ice dance competitors			
2015	Seoul	Lee Ho-jung; Richard Kam	No other competitors		
2016–17	No ice dance competitors				
2018	Seoul	Park Geun-yeong; Park Geon-woo	No other competitors		
2019	Seoul	Jeon Jeong-eun; Choi Seong-min	No other competitors		
2020	Uijeongbu	Jeon Jeong-eun; Choi Seong-min	No other competitors		
2021	Uijeongbu	No junior ice dance competitors			
2022	Uijeongbu	Hannah Lim; Ye Quan	Jinny Kim; Lee Na-mu	No other competitors	
2023	Uijeongbu	Hannah Lim; Ye Quan	Jinny Kim; Lee Na-mu	No other competitors	
2024	Uijeongbu	Jinny Kim; Lee Na-mu	No other competitors		
2025	Uijeongbu	No junior ice dance competitors			

== Records ==
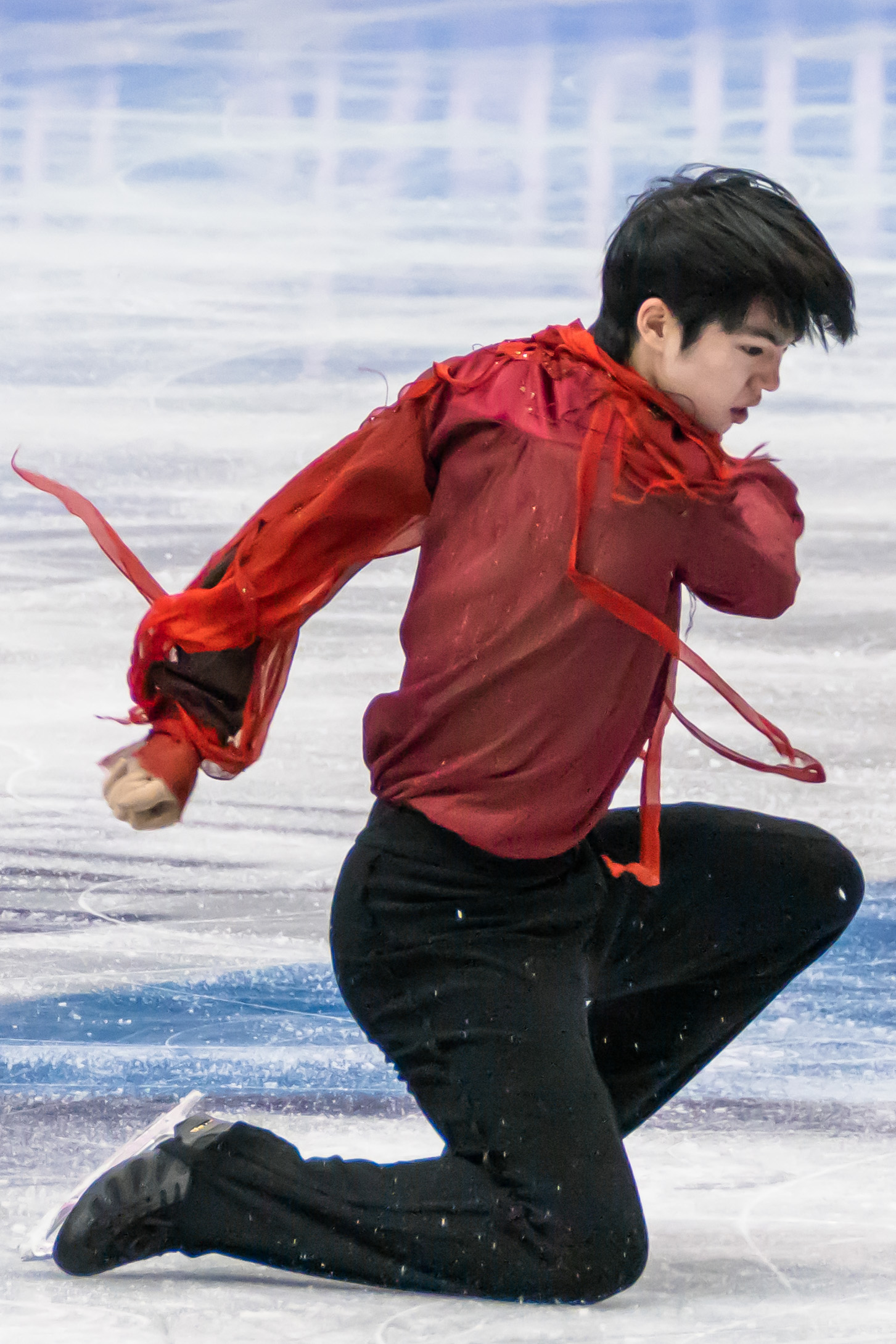
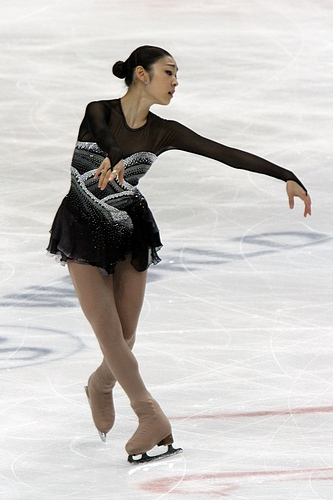
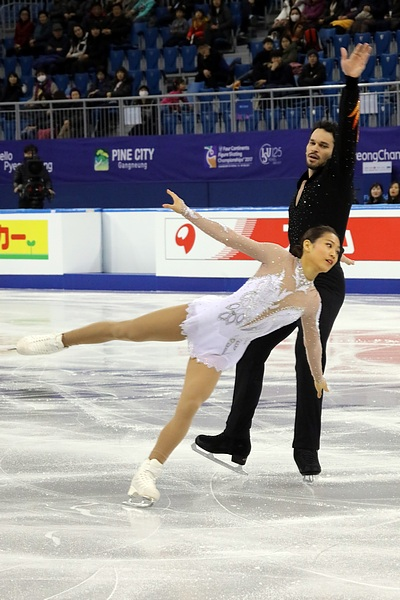
From left to right: Cha Jun-hwan has won ten South Korean Championship titles in men's singles; Yuna Kim won seven South Korean Championship titles in women's singles; and Ji Min-ji and Themistocles Leftheris won two South Korean Championship titles in pair skating.

Records
Discipline	Most championship titles			
Discipline	Skater(s)	No.	Years	Ref.
Men's singles	Cha Jun-hwan	10	2017–26	
Women's singles	Yuna Kim	7	2003–06; 2009; 2013–14	
Pairs	Ji Min-ji; Themistocles Leftheris	2	2016–17	
Ice dance	Yang Tae-hwa; Lee Chuen-gun	5	1998–2002	
