= Choi Hyung-kyung =

South Korean figure skater (born 1980)

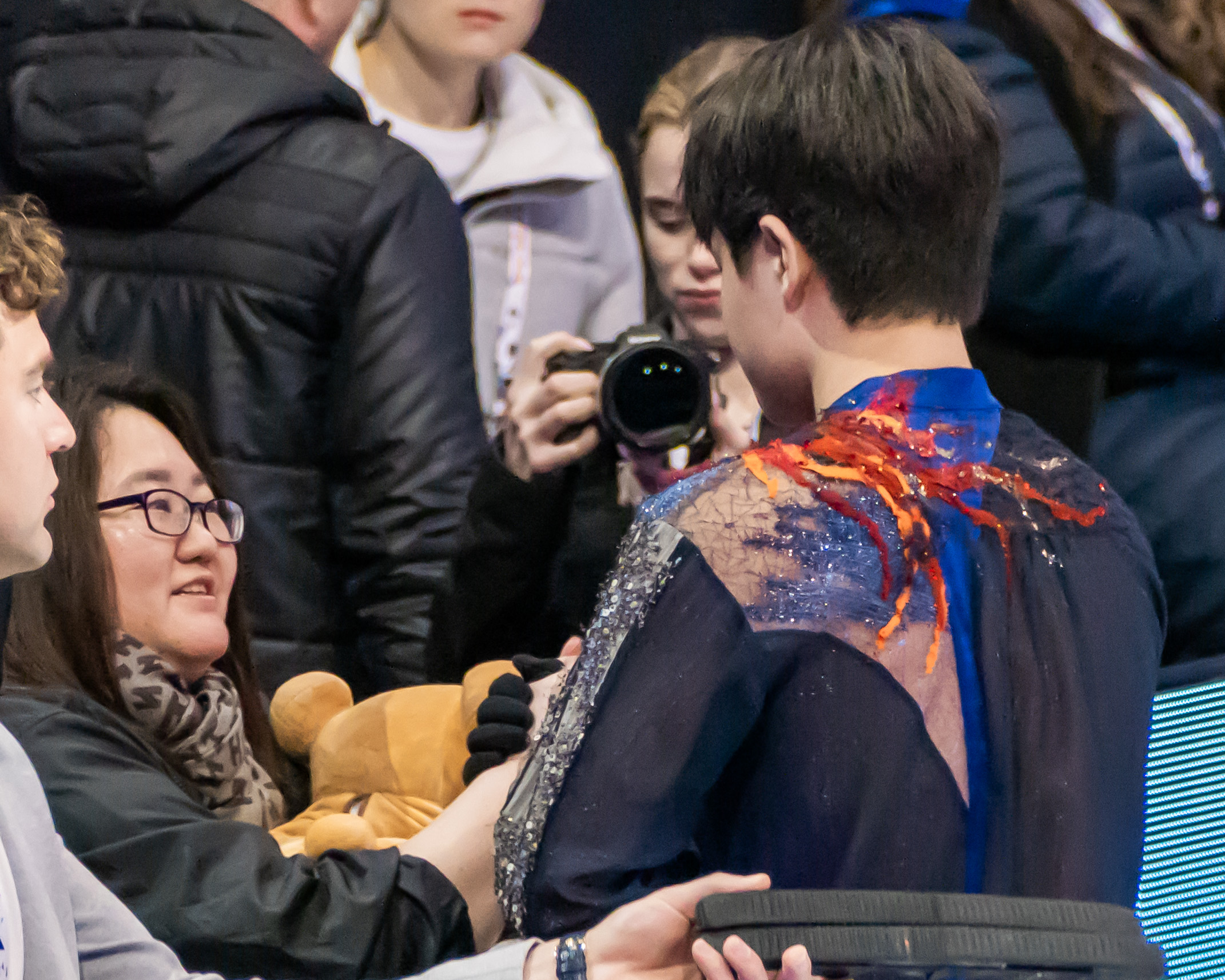
- Choi (left) at the 2025 World Championships

Personal information
- Native name: 최형경

Figure skating career
- Country: South Korea
- Retired: 2001

Choi Hyung-kyung (born 1980) is a former South Korean competitive figure skater. She is the 1995 South Korean National champion and 1997 South Korean National silver medalist. She also competed at two World Championships (1996, 1998).

She was coached by Shin Hea-sook.

== Personal life ==
Choi was born in 1980. She has a son.

== Coaching career ==
Following her retirement from competitive figure skating in 2001, Choi began working as a figure skating coach at the Gwacheon Ice Rink.

Her current students include:

- Cha Young-hyun
- Choi Ha-bin
- Han Hee-sue
- Huh Ji-yu
- Kim Chae-yeon
- Kim Hyun-gyeom
- Kim Mi-song
- Kim Seo-young
- Kim Yu-jae
- Kim Yu-seong
- Lee Hyo-rin
- Lee Si-hyeong
- Seo Min-kyu
- Song Si-woo
- Youn Seo-jin
- Yu Na-yeong

Her former students include:

- Hwang Jeon-gyul
- Kim Ha-nul
- Kim Jin-seo
- Kim Na-hyun
- Kim Ye-lim
- Kwak Min-jeong
- Kwon Min-sol
- Lee Dong-won
- Lee Hae-in
- Lee Ho-jung
- Lee Jae-keun
- Lim Eun-soo
- Lim Ju-heon
- Moon Bo-in
- Wi Seo-yeong
- You Young
- Yun Ah-sun

== Competitive highlights ==
International
Event	1994–95	1995–96	1996–97	1997–98
World Championships		14th Q		29th
Karl Schäfer Memorial				19th
International: Junior
World Junior Championships	17th Q			
JGP Ukraine				14th
National
South Korean Champ.	1st		2nd	
JGP = Junior Grand Prix; Q = Qualifying round
