= Themistocles Leftheris =

American-Korean pair skater (born 1982)

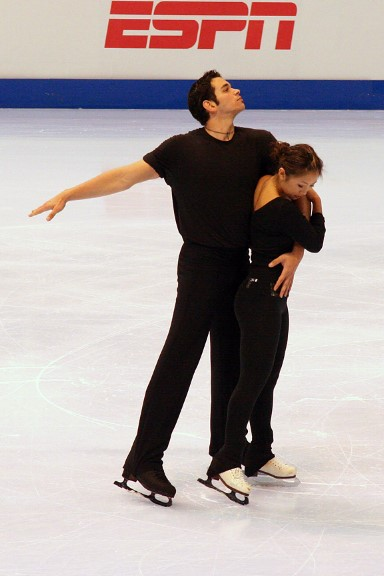
- Nam and Leftheris in 2006

Personal information
- Full name: Themistocles Nicholas Leftheris
- Other names: Themi Leftheris
- Born: December 20, 1982 (age 43) Tarpon Springs, Florida, U.S.
- Height: 6 ft 0 in (1.83 m)

Figure skating career
- Country: South Korea
- Partner: Ji Min-ji
- Coach: Peter Oppegard; Karen Kwan-Oppegard
- Skating club: Los Angeles FSC

Themistocles Nicholas "Themi" Leftheris (born December 20, 1982) is an American-South Korean pair skater. With partner Naomi Nari Nam, he is the 2006 Skate America bronze medalist and 2007 U.S. national bronze medalist. With partner Ji Min-ji, he is a two-time (2016, 2017) South Korean national champion.

== Personal life ==
Leftheris was born on December 20, 1982, in Tarpon Springs, Florida. He studied communications at Long Beach City College.

== Career ==
=== Early career ===
Leftheris started skating at age 12 and began pair skating at 15. His first skating partner was Sarah Jo Damron-Brown.

With Jacqueline Jimenez, he became the 2001 U.S. novice silver medalist. They won a silver medal at the first event of the 2001–02 ISU Junior Grand Prix. They did not get a second event because the USFSA did not send skaters to any of the events following the September 11, 2001 attacks.

Leftheris competed with Nicole Hartunian in the 2003–04 season. With partner Julian Burns, he placed 13th at the 2005 U.S. Figure Skating Championships.

=== Partnership with Nam ===
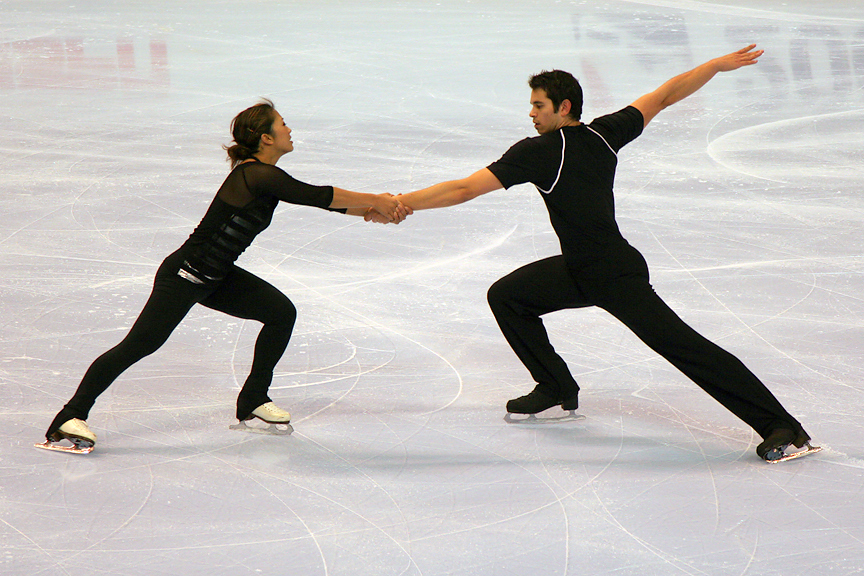
Nam & Leftheris at the 2006 Skate America.

Leftheris had a tryout with Naomi Nari Nam in April 2005, two weeks after she decided to switch to pair skating. After winning both Regionals and Pacific Coast Sectionals, the pair placed 5th at the 2006 U.S. Championships.

In the 2006–07 season, Nam and Leftheris won the bronze medal at their Grand Prix assignment, 2006 Skate America. They won the bronze medal at the 2007 U.S. Championships behind Rena Inoue / John Baldwin and Brooke Castile / Benjamin Okolski. They ranked 6th at the 2007 Four Continents Championships.

On August 24, 2007, Nam underwent surgery to remove a bone spur and to repair torn cartilage in her right hip. She was on crutches for eight weeks and returned to the ice on October 19. As a result, Nam/Leftheris withdrew from their Grand Prix assignments, 2007 Skate America and 2007 Cup of China. They placed 7th at the 2008 U.S. Championships. Nam announced her retirement from competitive skating on October 10, 2008, citing her recurrent hip injury.

Nam/Leftheris were coached by Peter Oppegard and Karen Kwan-Oppegard at the EastWest Ice Palace in Artesia, California.

=== Later career ===
Leftheris began competing with new partner Angelyn Nguyen in 2009. They won the bronze medal at the 2010 Pacific Coast Sectional Championships to qualify for the 2010 U.S. Championships. They withdrew from the U.S. Championships before the event began.

With Lindsay Davis, he finished 8th at the 2011 U.S. Championships.

In 2015, Leftheris teamed up with Ji Min-ji to compete for South Korea. The pair won the 2016 South Korean national title.

== Programs ==
=== With Ji ===
Season	Short program	Free skating
2016–2017	Angels & Demons by Hans Zimmer	Spectre by Thomas Newman

=== With Nam ===
Season	Short program	Free skating
2007–2008	Piano Fantasy by Aaron Copland	Liebesträume by Franz Liszt
2006–2007	Jalousie 'Tango Tzigane' by Jacob Gade	Gayaneh by Aram Khachaturian; Caravan

== Competitive highlights ==
GP: Grand Prix; CS: Challenger Series; JGP: Junior Grand Prix

=== With Ji Min-ji for South Korea ===
International
Event	2015–16	2016–17
World Championships		WD
Four Continents Champ.		14th
CS Golden Spin of Zagreb		7th
CS Lombardia Trophy		6th
National
South Korean Champ.	1st	1st

=== With Nguyen and Davis for the United States ===
International
Event	2010–11 (Davis)
Ice Challenge	4th
National
U.S. Championships	7th

=== With Nam for the United States ===
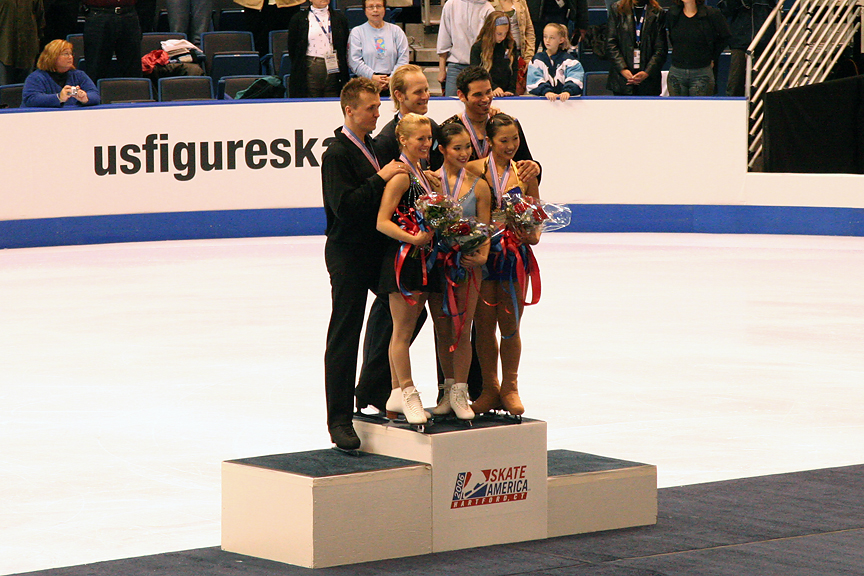
Nam & Leftheris on the podium at the 2006 Skate America.

International
Event	2005–06	2006–07	2007–08
Four Continents Champ.		6th	
GP Cup of China			WD
GP Skate America		3rd	WD
National
U.S. Championships	5th	3rd	7th
WD = Withdrew

=== With Damron-Brown, Jimenez, Hartunian, and Burns for the United States ===
International
Event	2001–02 (Jimenez)	2004–05 (Burns)
JGP Bulgaria	2nd	
National
U.S. Championships	6th J	13th
J = Junior
