= Byun Ji-hyun =

South Korean figure skater (born 1999)

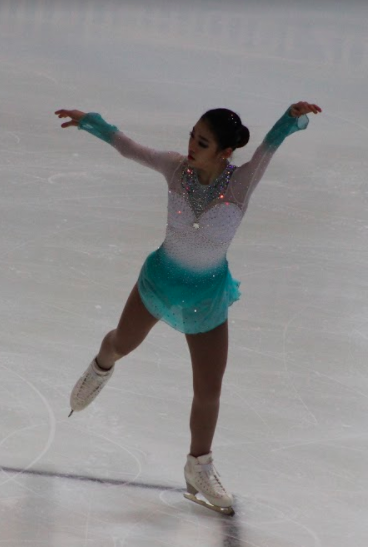
- Byun Ji-hyun in 2016

Personal information
- Native name: 변지현
- Full name: Byun Ji-hyun
- Born: March 9, 1999 (age 27) Seoul, South Korea
- Height: 1.65 m (5 ft 5 in)

Figure skating career
- Country: South Korea
- Skating club: Korea National Training Center

Byun Ji-hyun (Korean: 변지현; born March 9, 1999) is a South Korean former competitive figure skater. She is the 2015 Volvo Open Cup bronze medalist.

On the junior level, she is the 2014 Ice Challenge silver medalist and the 2011 South Korean junior national bronze medalist.

She placed 7th at the 2016 Winter Youth Olympics.

== Career ==
In 2011, Byun became the South Korean junior national bronze medalist. The following season, she competed on the senior level at the South Korean Championships, finishing fourth.

=== 2012–13 to 2014–15 ===
Making her international debut, Byun placed 15th at the 2012–13 Junior Grand Prix (JGP) event in Lake Placid, New York. She was 7th in the senior ranks at the 2013 South Korean Championships.

After placing 14th at the 2014 South Korean Championships, Byun competed at her first senior international, the 2014 Triglav Trophy, where she ranked 5th.

In the 2014–15 season, she placed 10th competing as a senior at the Lombardia Trophy, an ISU Challenger Series event held in Milan. Two months later, she won her first junior international medal – silver at the Ice Challenge Leo Scheu Memorial.

=== 2015–16 season ===
Byun started her season by placing 4th at her JGP assignment in Zagreb, Croatia. She scored a new personal best, 148.13 points. In November, she was awarded her first senior international medal – bronze at the 2015 Volvo Open Cup, after placing second in the short program and fourth in the free skate.

Back in Korea, she won the bronze medal at 2015 KSU President Cup Ranking Competition. She finished 10th at the 2016 South Korean Championships and was selected to compete at the 2016 Winter Youth Olympics in Hamar, Norway.

== Programs ==
Season	Short program	Free skating
2016–17	Nella Fantasia sung by Jackie Evancho; Ave Maria by Franz Schubert	Salome by Richard Strauss
2015–16	Nella Fantasia sung by Jackie Evancho	Carmen by Georges Bizet; Choeur: Au secours! Au secours! conducted by Thomas Beecham; Carmen Fantasie by David Garrett
2014–15	Die Fledermaus by Johann Strauss II	The Firebird by Igor Stravinsky
2013–14	Paganini Rhapsody by David Garrett	Brideshead Revisited by Adrian Johnston
2012–13	Paganini Rhapsody by David Garrett	Ballet Egyption, Op. 12, Pt. 2 performed by London Symphony Orchestra
2011–12	Hungarian Dance No. 4 in F Sharp Minor performed by Wiener Philharmoniker	The Nutcracker: Act II - Waltz of the Flowers performed by the Philadelphia Orchestra
2010–11	Rich Man's Frug (from Sweet Charity) by Christina Applegate	Othello by Elliot Goldenthal
2009–10	The Carnival of the Animals: 11. Pianistes. Allegro moderato by Camille Saint-Saëns	Mr. Magorium's Wonder Emporium by Alexandre Desplat, Aaron Zigman

== Competitive highlights ==
CS: Challenger Series; JGP: Junior Grand Prix

International
Event	10–11	11–12	12–13	13–14	14–15	15–16	16–17
CS Lombardia					10th		
CS Ondrej Nepela							7th
Triglav Trophy				5th			
Volvo Open Cup						3rd	
International: Junior
Youth Olympics						7th	
JGP Croatia						4th	
JGP U.S.			15th				
Ice Challenge					2nd		
National
South Korea	3rd J	4th	7th	14th	29th	10th	
Team events
Youth Olympics						4th T 3rd P	
J = Junior level T = Team result; P = Personal result.

== Detailed results ==
2016–17 season
Date	Event	Level	SP	FS	Total
September 29–October 1, 2015	2016 CS Ondrej Nepela Memorial	Senior	3; **57.76**	8; 91.87	7; **149.63**
2015–16 season
Date	Event	Level	SP	FS	Total
February 12–21, 2016	2016 Winter Youth Olympic Games - Team Event	Junior		3; **99.94**	4
February 12–21, 2016	2016 Winter Youth Olympic Games	Junior	5; 56.25	8; 87.45	7; 143.70
January 8–10, 2016	2016 South Korean Championships	Senior	5; 56.95	14; 95.88	10; 152.83
November 4–8, 2015	2015 Volvo Open Cup	Senior	2; 53.80	4; 88.71	3; 142.51
October 7–11, 2015	2015 ISU Junior Grand Prix, Croatia	Junior	6; 50.69	3; 97.44	4; 148.13
2014–15 season
Date	Event	Level	SP	FS	Total
January 7–9, 2015	2015 South Korean Championships	Senior	29; 39.78	- -	- -
November 12–16, 2014	2014 Ice Challenge	Junior	4; 45.41	2; 92.60	2; 138.01
September 18–21, 2014	2014 CS Lombardia Trophy	Senior	10; 44.97	9; 84.11	10; 129.08
2013–14 season
Date	Event	Level	SP	FS	Total
April 2–6, 2014	2014 Triglav Trophy	Senior	8; 42.33	4; 82.55	5; 124.88
January 3–5, 2014	2014 South Korean Championships	Senior	16; 46.30	13; 90.04	14; 136.34
2012–13 season
Date	Event	Level	SP	FS	Total
January 2–6, 2013	2013 South Korean Championships	Senior	8; 46.18	7; 88.60	7; 134.78
August 29–September 1, 2012	2012 ISU Junior Grand Prix, United States	Junior	14; 35.27	16; 64.06	15; 99.33

- ISU Personal best highlighted in **bold**.
