= Kim Se-yol =

South Korean figure skater (born 1973)

Personal information
- Born: 5 February 1973 (age 53)

Figure skating career
- Country: South Korea
- Retired: 1992

Kim Se-yol (Korean: 김세열; born February 5, 1973) is a South Korean former competitive figure skater. He competed at the 1992 World Championships and finished 31st.

Following his retirement from competitive skating, he became a coach and choreographer. Among his current and former students are Lee Kyu-hyun, Kim Yuna, and Lee Dong-whun.

== Competitive highlights ==
International
Event	1988–89	1989–90	1990–91	1991–92
World Championships				31st
World Junior Champ.	25th	19th	27th	
National
South Korean Champ.				
