= Kim Hyeon-jung (figure skater) =

South Korean figure skater (born 1992)

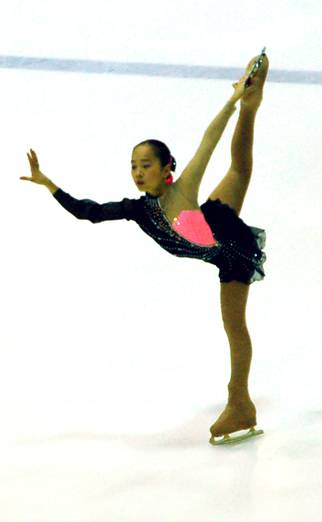
- Kim at the 2008–2009 South Korean Figure Skating Championships.

Personal information
- Full name: Kim Hyeon-jung
- Born: October 31, 1992 (age 33) Seoul
- Height: 1.46 m (4 ft 9 in)

Figure skating career
- Country: South Korea
- Coach: Tae Yeong Lee

- Kim Hyeon-jung
- Hangul: 김현정
- RR: Gim Hyeonjeong
- MR: Kim Hyŏnjŏng

Kim Hyeon-jung (born October 31, 1992), also transliterated Hyun-jung or Hyeon-jeong, is a South Korean figure skater. She is the 2008 & 2009 South Korean silver medalist. She was born in Seoul.

She made her international debut in the 2007–2008 season, when she competed on the 2007–2008 ISU Junior Grand Prix in two events, with a highest placement of 9th. She competed at the 2008 World Junior Figure Skating Championships, where she placed 14th. She made her senior international debut at the 2009 Four Continents, where she placed 14th. Now she is a figure skating coach and she is teaching her younger brother, Kim Hwan-jin.

== Competitive highlights ==
Event	2006–2007	2007–2008	2008–2009	2009–2010
Four Continents Championships			14th	
World Junior Championships		14th		
South Korean Championships	2nd J.	2nd	2nd	7th
Triglav Trophy			3rd	
New Zealand Winter Games				1st J.
Junior Grand Prix, Spain			10th	
Junior Grand Prix, Italy			20th	
Junior Grand Prix, Romania		9th		
Junior Grand Prix, Germany		18th		

- J = Junior level

== Detailed results ==
2009–2010 season
Date	Event	Level	SP	FS	Total
January 9–10, 2010	2010 South Korean National Championships	Senior	7; 34.54	7; 60.47	7; 95.01
August 28–30, 2009	2009 New Zealand Winter Games	Junior	1; 43.72	2; 62.40	1; 106.12

2008–2009 season
Date	Event	Level	SP	FS	Total
April 1–4, 2009	2009 Triglav Trophy	Senior	7; 40.20	2; 82.40	3; 122.60
February 4–8, 2009	2009 Four Continents Championships	Senior	17; 41.64	12; 80.00	14; 121.64
January 9–10, 2009	2009 South Korean National Championships	Senior	3; 40.88	1; 82.76	2; 123.64
September 24–28, 2008	ISU Junior Grand Prix, Spain	Junior	6; 42.26	11; 66.63	10; 108.89
September 3–7, 2008	ISU Junior Grand Prix, Italy	Junior	9; 42.90	24; 52.27	20; 95.17

2007–2008 season
Date	Event	Level	SP	FS	Total
February 25–March 2, 2008	2008 World Junior Figure Skating Championships	Junior	13; 45.19	15; 69.90	14; 115.09
January 10–11, 2008	2008 South Korean National Championships	Senior	3; 47.12	2; 83.57	2; 130.69
October 10–13, 2007	Junior Grand Prix, Germany	Junior	18; 32.41	17; 53.78	18; 86.19
September 6–9, 2007	Junior Grand Prix, Romania	Junior	9; 33.66	9; 64.33	9; 97.99
