= Kim Chae-hwa =

Korean Japanese figure skater

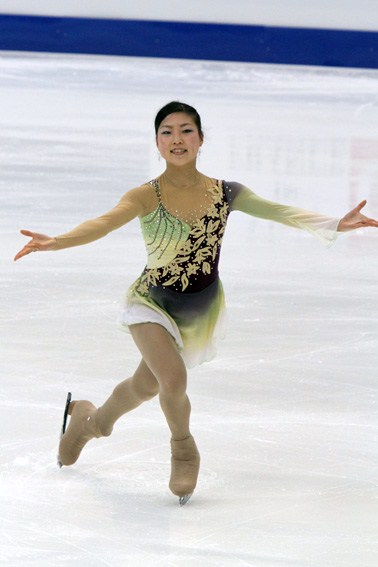
- Kim at the 2011 Four Continents

Personal information
- Other names: Ayaka Nagase
- Born: November 7, 1988 (age 38)
- Height: 1.58 m (5 ft 2 in)

Figure skating career
- Country: South Korea
- Skating club: Daigo Kyoto City Club
- Retired: 2011
Medal record
Representing South Korea
Figure skating: Ladies' singles
South Korean Championships
Bronze medal – third place	2009 Goyang	Ladies' singles
Bronze medal – third place	2008 Goyang	Ladies' singles
Gold medal – first place	2007 Seoul	Ladies' singles
Bronze medal – third place	2005 Seoul	Ladies' singles

Kim Chae-hwa

Japanese name
- Kanji: 長瀬彩華
Transcriptions
- Romanization: Nagase Ayaka

Korean name
- Hangul: 김채화
- Hanja: 金彩華
Transcriptions
- Revised Romanization: Gim Chaehwa
- McCune–Reischauer: Kim Ch'aehwa

Kim Chae-hwa (Korean: 김채화; born November 7, 1988), also known by her Japanese name Ayaka Nagase (長瀬彩華), is a South Korean former competitive figure skater. She is the 2007 South Korean national champion. Her best result at an ISU Championship was seventh at the 2006 World Junior Championships.

== Personal life ==
Kim Chae-hwa was born as Ayaka Nagase on November 7, 1988, in Osaka, Japan. She is a Zainichi Korean. She studied at Kansai University.

== Career ==
Kim started skating at the age of 6 in Japan. She competed in Japanese domestic competitions until 2004. In 2004, the Korean Sports Council granted Kim a special scholarship for overseas Korean athletes. She was the first person to receive this scholarship.

Kim debuted internationally for Korea in the 2005–06 season. Sent to two ISU Junior Grand Prix events, she placed fourth in Canada and fifth in Poland. She appeared at two World Junior Championships, placing seventh in 2006 and 15th in 2007. On the senior level, Kim competed at six Four Continents Championships — her highest placement was 13th in 2010 — and at three Grand Prix events. She retired from competition in 2011.

== Programs ==
Season	Short program	Free skating	Exhibition
2010–11	Fantasy for Violin and Orchestra	Carmen by Georges Bizet	
2009–10	Piano Fantasy	Evita	
2008–09	Piano Fantasy	Titanic by James Horner	
2007–08	La cumparsita by Gerardo Matos Rodríguez; Tango Jalousie by Jacob Gade	Poeta (Flamenco) by Vicente Amigo	Ghost: Mouichido Dakishimetai by Michiru Oshima
2006–07	La cumparsita by Gerardo Matos Rodríguez; Tango Jalousie by Jacob Gade	Piano Concerto by Sergei Prokofiev	
2005–06	The Four Seasons by Antonio Vivaldi	Danse macabre by Camille Saint-Saëns	
2004–05	Cinderella by Sergei Prokofiev	Don Quixote by Ludwig Minkus; Swan Lake by Pyotr Ilyich Tchaikovsky	

== Competitive highlights ==
GP: Grand Prix; JGP: Junior Grand Prix

International
Event	03–04	04–05	05–06	06–07	07–08	08–09	09–10	10–11
Four Continents		14th	14th	14th	16th		13th	16th
GP Cup of China				10th				
GP NHK Trophy				9th	9th			
Asian Games								6th
Universiade						12th		
International: Junior
Junior Worlds			7th	15th				
JGP Canada			4th					
JGP Poland			5th					
National
South Korean		3rd	5th	1st	3rd	3rd	4th	4th
Japan Jr. Champ.	20th							
