= Choi Ha-bin =

South Korean figure skater (born 2009)

Personal information
- Native name: 최하빈
- Other names: Habin Choi; Choi Habin
- Born: November 4, 2009 (age 17) Seoul, South Korea
- Home town: Seoul, South Korea
- Height: 1.58 m (5 ft 2 in)

Figure skating career
- Country: South Korea
- Coach: Choi Hyung-kyung; Kim Na-hyun; Kim Min-seok
- Began skating: 2019

Medal record
South Korean Championships
Bronze medal – third place	2026 Seoul	Singles

Choi Ha-bin (Korean: 최하빈; born 4 November 2009) is a South Korean figure skater. He is the 2026 South Korean national bronze medalist. On the junior level, he is a three-time ISU Junior Grand Prix medalist and the 2023 South Korean junior national champion.

He is the first South Korean to land a quadruple lutz in international competition.

== Personal life ==
Choi was born on 4 November 2009 in Seoul, South Korea. His favorite skater is Nathan Chen.

== Competitive skating career ==
=== Early years ===
Choi was the 2023 South Korean junior national champion, after successfully landing a triple axel in both his short program and his free skate.

=== 2023–24 season: Junior international debut ===
Choi made his junior international debut at the Denis Ten Memorial, where he placed first. At the senior level, he would go on to place seventh 2024 South Korean Figure Skating Championships.

=== 2024–25 season: Junior Grand Prix debut ===
Choi made his ISU Junior Grand Prix debut at 2024 JGP Thailand in Bangkok. After a clean skate, he was third in the short program but placed seventh in the free skate, falling on three jumps, including on a quadruple salchow attempt. He would go on to place sixth overall in the event. His second Junior Grand Prix assignment was to 2024 JGP Slovenia in Ljubljana. Again, he was third after the short program and seventh in the free skate. In the free skate, he landed his first quadruple salchow in international competition and placed fifth overall.

Subsequently, he would place fifth at the 2025 South Korean Figure Skating Championships and was assigned to the 2025 World Junior Championships. He was sixth in the short program and fourth in the free skate, placing fifth overall at his first World Junior Figure Skating Championship. "I made a mistake on the quad toe, but everything else went well, so I’m very happy about that," he said in an interview after his free skate. "I’m very glad I could be in the top six at my first Junior Worlds."

=== 2025–26 season: Junior Grand Prix Final, National bronze medal ===
Choi competed in 2025 JGP Italy in Varese, where he was first after the short program but fell to second overall behind Taiga Nishino after mistakes in his free skate. Nevertheless, he successfully landed a quadruple lutz in the free, becoming the first South Korean to land one in international competition. At 2025 JGP Poland in Gdańsk, he won his first Junior Grand Prix gold medal, which qualified him for the 2025–26 Junior Grand Prix Final.

At the 2025–26 Junior Grand Prix Final in Nagoya, Choi was fifth after the short program after missing his mandatory jump combination. "I was kind of nervous because there were a lot of audience and spectators in the stadium today," he shared following his short program. Choi was sixth in the free skate and therefore finished sixth overall at the Junior Grand Prix Final. At the 2026 South Korean Figure Skating Championships, he placed third in both the short program and the free skate to win the bronze medal, behind Cha Jun-hwan and Seo Min-kyu.

Selected to compete at the 2026 World Junior Championships in Tallinn, he was ninth in the short and fourth in the free short to finish in fifth place overall.

=== 2026–27 season ===
Opening his international season at 2026 JGP Latvia in Riga, Choi was fifth after the short program after making a mistake on his combination jump. However, he came back from fifth to first in the free, scoring a personal best and winning his second JGP gold medal. With his free skate, he became the first South Korean to land three quadruple jumps—two quadruple lutzes, one in combination, and one quadruple toe loop—in a program in international competition. Habin later won the bronze medal at the JGP in Turkey.

== Programs ==
Season	Short program	Free skating	Exhibition
2026–2027	Warsaw Concerto by Richard Addinsell choreo. by Shin Yea-ji	Pirates of the Caribbean: Dead Men Tell No Tales by Geoff Zanelli choreo. by Misha Ge	
2025–2026	TaeGukGi by Lee Dong June choreo. by Shin Yea-ji	Pirates of the Caribbean: Dead Men Tell No Tales by Geoff Zanelli choreo. by Misha Ge	You Raise Me Up by Westlife; Only You (And You Alone) by The Platters
2024–2025	Tron: Legacy; Overture; Fall by Daft Punk choreo. by Shin Yea-ji	TaeGukGi by Lee Dong June choreo. by Shin Yea-ji	
2023–2024	Tron: Legacy; Overture; Fall by Daft Punk choreo. by Shin Yea-ji	"Dragon Theme, Father's Nightmare" from Dragon: The Bruce Lee Story by Randy Edelman	
2022–2023	"In This Shirt" by The Irrepressibles	"The Dragon's Heartbeat" from Dragon: The Bruce Lee Story by Randy Edelman	

== Competitive highlights ==
- JGP – Event of the ISU Junior Grand Prix Series
- TBD – Assigned
- WD – Withdrew from competition

Competition placements at senior level
Season	2023–24	2024–25	2025–26
South Korean Championships	7th	5th	3rd

Competition placements at junior level
Season	2022–23	2023–24	2024–25	2025–26	2026–27
World Junior Championships			5th	5th	
Junior Grand Prix Final				6th	TBD
South Korean Championships	1st				
JGP Thailand			6th		
JGP Slovenia			5th		
JGP Italy				2nd	
JGP Poland				1st	
JGP Latvia					1st
JGP Turkey					3rd
Denis Ten Memorial		1st			

== Detailed Results ==
ISU personal best scores in the +5/-5 GOE System
Segment	Type	Score	Event
Total	**TSS**	**246.41**	2026 JGP Latvia
Short program	**TSS**	**78.53**	2025 JGP Poland
Short program	TES	43.35	2025 World Junior Championships
Short program	PCS	36.45	2026 JGP Latvia
Free skating	**TSS**	**170.20**	2026 JGP Latvia
Free skating	TES	98.70	2026 JGP Latvia
Free skating	PCS	71.93	2025 JGP Italy

Current personal best scores are highlighted in bold.

=== Senior level ===
Results in the 2023-24 season
Date	Event	SP		FS		Total	
Date	Event	P	Score	P	Score	P	Score
Jan 4–7, 2024	(South Korea) 2024 South Korean Championships	9	64.41	5	151.02	7	215.43

Results in the 2024-25 season
Date	Event	SP		FS		Total	
Date	Event	P	Score	P	Score	P	Score
Jan 2–5, 2025	(South Korea) 2025 South Korean Championships	4	80.49	5	158.48	5	238.97

Results in the 2025–26 season
Date	Event	SP		FS		Total	
Date	Event	P	Score	P	Score	P	Score
Jan 3–6, 2026	(South Korea) 2026 South Korean Championships	3	85.96	3	172.22	3	258.18

=== Junior level ===
2026–27 season
Date	Event	SP	FS	Total
September 17–19, 2026	2026 JGP Turkey	3 69.66	4 125.23	3 194.89
August 27–29, 2026	2026 JGP Latvia	5; 76.21	1; **170.20**	1; **246.41**
2025–26 season
Date	Event	SP	FS	Total
March 3–8, 2026	2026 World Junior Championships	9; 75.78	4; 148.58	5; 224.36
December 4–7, 2025	2025–26 Junior Grand Prix Final	5; 70.94	6; 129.76	6; 200.70
October 1–4, 2025	2025 JGP Poland	2; **78.53**	1; 148.73	1; 227.26
September 3–6, 2025	2025 JGP Italy	1; 77.76	2; 154.43	2; 232.19
2024–25 season
Date	Event	SP	FS	Total
February 25–March 2, 2025	2025 World Junior Championships	6; 77.22	4; 150.06	5; 227.28
October 2–5, 2024	2024 JGP Slovenia	3; 70.97	7; 129.79	5; 200.7
September 11–14, 2024	2024 JGP Thailand	3; 74.03	7; 120.39	6; 194.41
2023–24 season
Date	Event	SP	FS	Total
November 1–4, 2023	2023 Denis Ten Memorial	2; 63.82	1; 138.22	1; 202.04
2022–23 season
Date	Event	SP	FS	Total
January 5–8, 2023	2023 South Korean Championships	1; 71.83	1; 142.81	1; 214.64
