= Lee Gwang-yeong =

South Korean figure skater

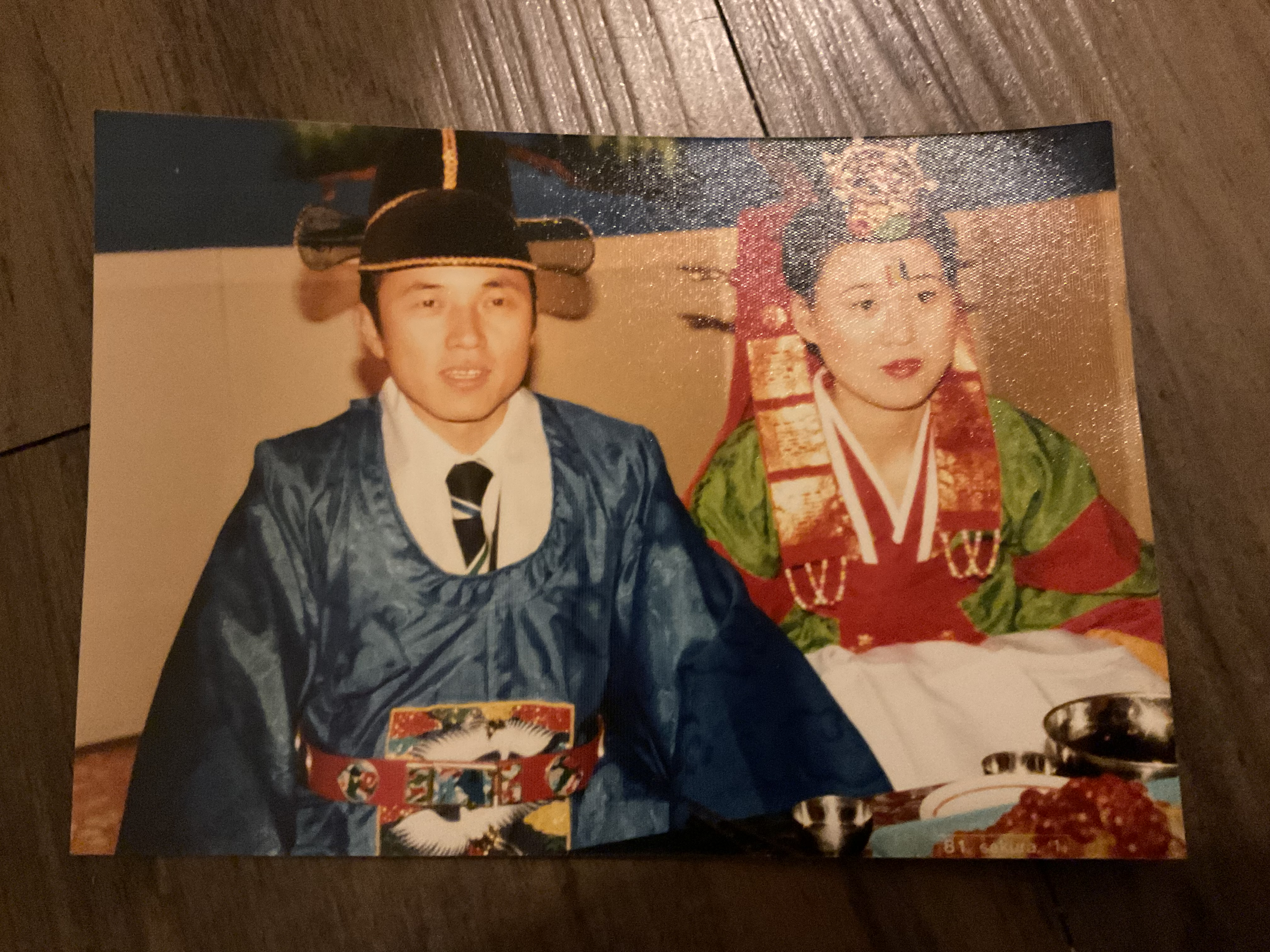
- Lee Gwang-yeong and his wife at their wedding

Personal information
- Nationality: South Korean
- Born: 9 September 1946 (age 80) Seoul, South Korea

Sport
- Sport: Figure skating

Lee Gwang-yeong (born 9 September 1946) is a South Korean figure skater. He has a wife, two children, and two grandchildren living in the United States. Lee Gwang-yeong also competed in the men's singles event at the 1968 Winter Olympics. He served in the U.S. and Korean military.

He was described as a member of the "first generation of figure skaters". He later became a coach.
