= Lee Dong-whun =

South Korean figure skater (born 1987)

Personal information
- Born: June 25, 1987 (age 39)
- Height: 170 cm (5 ft 7 in)

Figure skating career
- Country: South Korea
- Coach: Se-Yol Kim, Bit-Na Park
- Skating club: Dong-Chun Skate Club

Lee Dong-whun (Korean: 이동훈, born June 25, 1987) is a South Korean figure skater. He is the 2004-2008 South Korean national champion. He trained at the Lake Arrowhead, California, while being coached by Rafael Arutyunyan, the former coach of Michelle Kwan. He was born in Seoul, South Korea.

== Results ==
Event	2000-01	2001-02	2002-03	2003-04	2004-05	2005-06	2006-07	2007-08	2008-09
World Championships			33rd	31st			34th		
Four Continents Championships				12th	16th				
World Junior Championships		29th	21st	27th					
South Korean Championships	2nd	1st J.	2nd	1st	1st	1st	1st	1st	3rd
Karl Schäfer Memorial						20th			
Winter Universiade							28th		
Asian Winter Games			7th				7th		
