= Naomi Nari Nam =

American figure skater (born 1985)

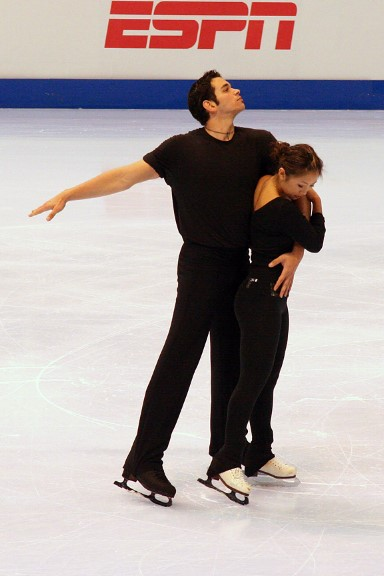
- Nam and Leftheris in 2006.

Personal information
- Born: July 6, 1985 (age 41) Anaheim, California, U.S.
- Height: 5 ft 0 in (1.53 m)

Figure skating career
- Country: United States
- Skating club: All Year FSC
- Retired: October 10, 2008

Naomi Nari Nam (born July 6, 1985) is an American former competitive figure skater who competed in both single skating and pair skating. As a single skater, she was the 1999 U.S. national silver medalist. As a pair skater, she was the 2006 Skate America bronze medalist and 2007 U.S. national bronze medalist with Themistocles Leftheris.

== Personal life ==
Naomi Nari Nam was born July 6, 1985, in Anaheim, California. She is Korean American and fluent in Korean. She married Tyler Poor on August 2, 2010, in Orange County, California. The couple's son, Aiden Zachary Poor, was born in March 2011, and their daughter, Bella Tatum Poor, on April 16, 2013.

== Skating career ==
=== Singles career ===
Nam won the novice ladies' title at the 1997 U.S. Championships. She was awarded the pewter medal on the junior level at the 1998 U.S. Championships.

Competing on the senior level, Nam won the silver medal at the 1999 U.S. Championships, behind Michelle Kwan. She subsequently received endorsements in South Korea and appeared on The Tonight Show with Jay Leno. As Nam did not meet the ISU's age criteria for the 1999 World Championships, 4th-ranked U.S. lady Sarah Hughes was sent in her stead. Although Hughes was also not old enough, she had an exemption due to her medal at the 1999 World Junior Championships. Nam had not competed at Junior Worlds because that season's competition had taken place prior to the U.S. Championships.

Nam competed in the 1999–2000 ISU Junior Grand Prix (JGP) series, winning a silver medal in Canada and placing 7th in Japan. She did not qualify for the JGP Final. At the 2000 U.S. Championships, she placed 8th and was not sent to the 2000 World Junior Championships.

John Nicks coached her in Costa Mesa, California. Signs of tendonitis in her hip began appearing in July 2000; a few months later, she heard a pop as she practiced a triple Lutz jump and was subsequently diagnosed with a fracture in her growth plate. After healing, she went to the 2001 U.S. Championships but had to withdraw due to hip pain which re-surfaced a day before the competition. After receiving a diagnosis of torn cartilage in her hip joint, she underwent surgery at Holy Cross Hospital in Florida.

In 2003, Nam won the Southwest Pacific Regional title but placed 5th at the Pacific Coast Sectionals, which meant that she did not qualify for the 2004 U.S. Championships.

=== Pairs career ===
Two weeks after deciding to switch to pair skating, Nam had a try out with Themi Leftheris, in April 2005. After winning both Regionals and Pacific Coast Sectionals, the pair placed 5th at the 2006 U.S. Championships.

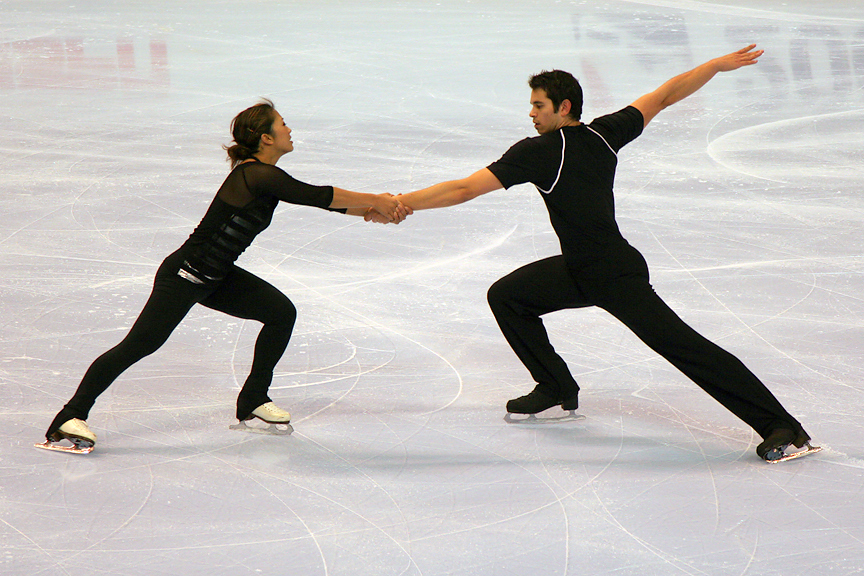
Nam & Leftheris at the 2006 Skate America.

In the 2006–07 season, Nam and Leftheris won the bronze medal at their Grand Prix assignment, 2006 Skate America. They won the bronze medal at the 2007 U.S. Championships behind Rena Inoue / John Baldwin and Brooke Castile / Benjamin Okolski. They ranked 6th at the 2007 Four Continents Championships.

On August 24, 2007, Nam underwent surgery to remove a bone spur and to repair torn cartilage in her right hip. She was on crutches for eight weeks and returned to the ice on October 19. As a result, Nam/Leftheris withdrew from their Grand Prix assignments, 2007 Skate America and 2007 Cup of China. They placed 7th at the 2008 U.S. Championships. Nam announced her retirement from competitive skating on October 10, 2008, citing her recurrent hip injury.

Nam/Leftheris were coached by Peter Oppegard and Karen Kwan-Oppegard at the EastWest Ice Palace in Artesia, California.

== Programs ==
=== With Leftheris ===
Season	Short program	Free skating
2007–08	Piano Fantasy by Aaron Copland	Liebesträume by Franz Liszt
2006–07	Jalousie 'Tango Tzigane' by Jacob Gade	Gayaneh by Aram Khachaturian; Caravan

=== Single skating ===
Season	Short program	Free skating	Exhibition
2000–01	Cirque du Soleil: Dralion by Violaine Corradi; Ninkou Latora; Bamboo choreo. by Naomi Nari Nam, John Nicks	Miss Saigon Rhapsody by Claude-Michel Schönberg choreo. by Naomi Nari Nam, John Nicks	Sway by Shaft, Burn the Floor choreo. by Christopher Dean; Even Now by Linda Eder choreo. by Jenni Meno, Todd Sand
1999–2000	Where Eagles Dare	Pierre Boles; Rondo Capriccioso by Camille Saint-Saëns	Rockin' Robin
1998–99	"Innocence" and "Zydeko" from Quidam by Cirque du Soleil	Piano Concerto No 2; Piano Concerto No 3 by Sergei Rachmaninoff	Itty Bitty Pretty One; Getting to Know You
1997–98	Sabre Dance (from Gayane) by Aram Khachaturian	The Nutcracker by Pyotr Ilyich Tchaikovsky	

== Competitive highlights ==
GP: Grand Prix; JGP: Junior Grand Prix

=== Pairs with Leftheris ===
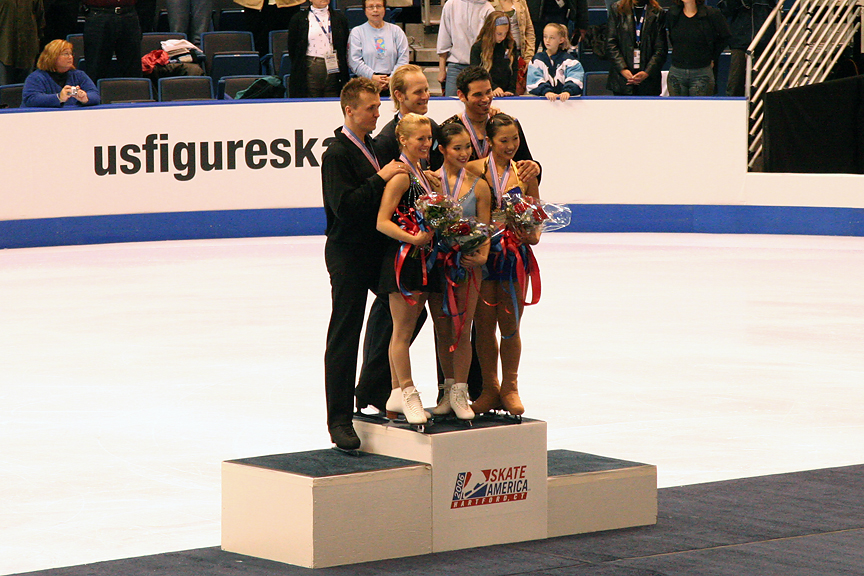
Nam & Leftheris on the podium at the 2006 Skate America.

International
Event	05–06	06–07	07–08
Four Continents		6th	
GP Cup of China			WD
GP Skate America		3rd	WD
National
U.S. Champ.	5th	3rd	7th
Pacific Coast	1st		

=== Ladies' singles ===
International
Event	97–98	98–99	99–00	00–01
JGP Canada			2nd	
JGP Japan			7th	
National
U.S. Champ.	4th J	2nd	8th	WD
