= Kim Na-young (figure skater) =

South Korean figure skater (born 1990)

- Hangul: 김나영
- Hanja: 金羅英
- RR: Gim Nayeong
- MR: Kim Nayŏng

Kim Na-Young
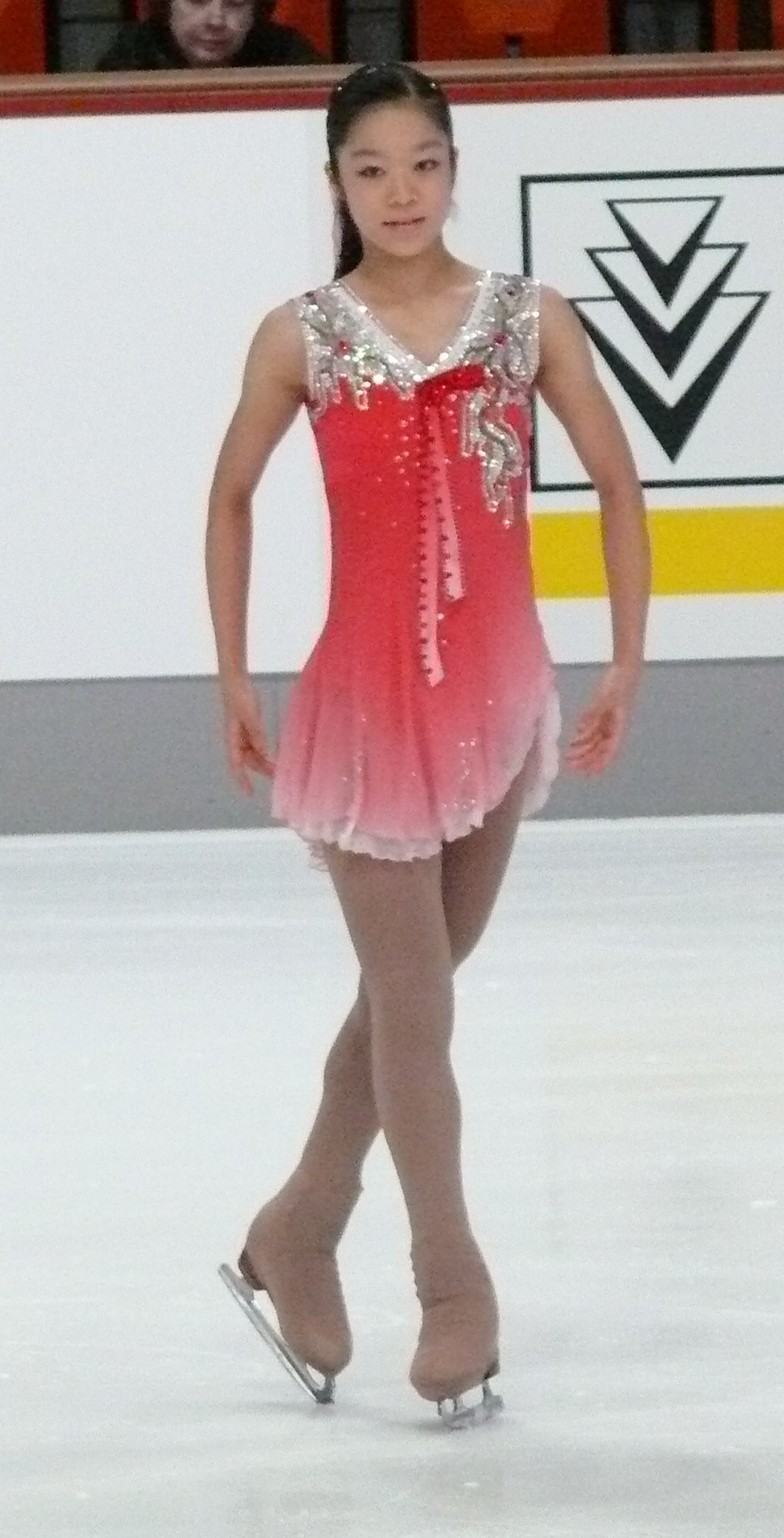
- Kim in 2008

Personal information
- Full name: Kim Na-Young
- Born: November 18, 1990 (age 35) Jeonju
- Home town: Incheon
- Height: 1.58 m (5 ft 2 in)

Figure skating career
- Country: South Korea
- Coach: Lee Chang Joo
Medal record
Representing South Korea
Women's Figure skating
Asian Figure Skating Trophy
Silver medal – second place	2008 Asian Trophy	Hong Kong
Silver medal – second place	2007 Asian Trophy	Taipei
New Zealand Winter Games
Bronze medal – third place	2009 New Zealand Winter Games	Dunedin

Kim Na-young (born November 18, 1990) is a South Korean former competitive figure skater. She is a two-time South Korean national champion (2007 & 2008), a two-time Asian Trophy silver medalist, and a two-time bronze medalist on the ISU Junior Grand Prix circuit.

== Personal life ==
Kim Na-Young was born in 1990 in Jeonju, South Korea. She moved to Incheon when she was five years old.

== Career ==
Kim began skating at age five. She landed her first double Axel jump at age 10. She placed 4th on the novice level at her first international competition, the 2002 Golden Bear of Zagreb. She was 12 years old at the time. She had a knee injury at age 13.

Kim was given her first Junior Grand Prix assignments in the 2005–2006 season, when she was 15. She placed 16th in the 2005–2006 ISU Junior Grand Prix event in Croatia and 19th in Estonia. Later that season, she won the silver medal on the junior level at the South Korean Championships.

During the 2006–2007 ISU Junior Grand Prix season, Kim placed 16th at her first event and then won the bronze medal at the event in Taipei. It was her first international medal. Although injured in a car accident in December 2006, she competed through injury and became the 2007 South Korean Junior national champion. She was sent to the 2007 Four Continents Championships, her senior international debut, where she placed 13th.

Kim won the silver medal at the Asian Figure Skating Championships.

During the 2007–2008 ISU Junior Grand Prix series, she placed 21st at the event in Austria, but won her second JGP bronze medal at the event in Croatia. At the 2007–2008 South Korean Figure Skating Championships, with Yuna Kim not competing, Kim Na-young won the gold medal. She was sent to the 2008 Four Continents Championships, where she placed 4th. Following this, she was sent to the 2008 World Championships and finished 19th.

Kim began the following season at the 2008 Nebelhorn Trophy. She initially received one senior Grand Prix assignment, to the 2008 NHK Trophy, and was later invited to the 2008 Cup of Russia due to vacancies created by some skaters withdrawing from the event.

== Programs ==
Season	Short program	Free skating	Exhibition
2009–2010	Don Quixote by Ludwig Minkus	Romeo and Juliet Fantasy Overture by Pyotr Ilyich Tchaikovsky	You Can't Stop the Beat from Hairspray
2008–2009	Romance No. 2 by Ludwig van Beethoven; Hwang Jin-i (from Hwang Jin-i OST)	Lara's Theme (from Doctor Zhivago); Romeo and Juliet Fantasy Overture by Pyotr Ilyich Tchaikovsky	Ave Maria
2007–2008	Romance for violin and orchestra No. 2 in F major, Op. 50 by Ludwig van Beethoven	Moldova by Camille Saint-Saëns; Dark Eyes; Gypsy Violin; Two Guitars by Sergei Trofanov	Goose's Dream by Insooni; Hwang Jin-i (from Hwang Jin-i OST)
2006–2007	Romeo and Juliet	Argentine tango	

== Competitive highlights ==
GP: Grand Prix; JGP: Junior Grand Prix

International
Event	02–03	03–04	04–05	05–06	06–07	07–08	08–09	09–10
Worlds						19th	17th	
Four Continents					13th	4th	16th	15th
GP Cup of Russia							9th	
GP NHK Trophy							9th	
Nebelhorn Trophy							7th	
Triglav Trophy							2nd	
Universiade							7th	
New Zealand WG								3rd
Asian Trophy						2nd	2nd	
International: Junior or novice
JGP Austria						21st		
JGP Croatia				16th		3rd		
JGP Estonia				19th				
JGP Norway					12th			
JGP Taiwan					3rd			
Golden Bear	4th N							
National
South Korea				2nd J	1st J	1st	1st	5th
Levels: N = Novice; J = Junior
