= An So-hyun =

South Korean figure skater (born 2001)

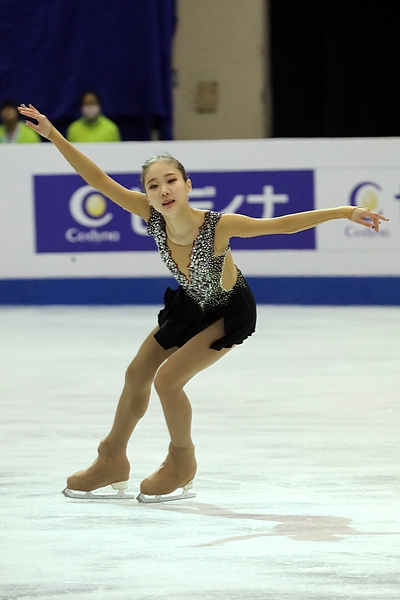
- An at the 2017 World Junior Championships

Personal information
- Born: December 28, 2001 (age 24) Seoul, South Korea
- Height: 1.56 m (5 ft 1 1/2 in)

Figure skating career
- Country: South Korea
- Coach: Ghisland Briand
- Skating club: Toronto Cricket, Skating and Curling Club
- Began skating: 2010

- An So-hyun
- Hangul: 안소현
- Hanja: 安 昭炫
- RR: An Sohyeon
- MR: An Sohyŏn

An So-hyun (born December 28, 2001) is a South Korean figure skater. She is the 2017 CS Minsk-Arena Ice Star bronze medalist, the 2015 South Korean national bronze medalist, and the 2014 South Korean junior national champion. She competed in the final segment at the 2017 World Junior Championships.

== Career ==
=== 2014-15 and 2015-16 ===
Competing on the senior level, A won the bronze medal at the 2015 South Korean Championships.

By placing third at a South Korean qualification competition, she earned two 2015–16 ISU Junior Grand Prix assignments. Competing in the JGP series, she placed eighth at the JGP Bratislava and fifth at the JGP Logroño. She placed ninth at the 2016 South Korean Championships.

=== 2016-17 ===
An received no JGP assignments but was sent to the 2016 Autumn Classic International, where she won the junior bronze medal.

She finished seventh at the 2017 South Korean Championships and was assigned to the 2017 World Junior Championships in Taipei after another skater withdrew. She qualified to the free skate in Taiwan, where she placed twentieth overall.

=== 2017-18 ===
An began her season at the 2017 Asian Open, where she placed fourth overall. She set three personal best scores to win the bronze medal at the 2017 Ice Star. She finished her season with a thirteenth place finish at the 2018 South Korean Championships.

=== 2018-19 ===
An's only competition this season was the 2019 South Korean Championships, where she placed twenty-third.

== Programs ==
Season	Short program	Free skating	Exhibition
2018–2019	I Dreamed a Dream (from Les Misérables) by Claude-Michel Schönberg	Adiós Nonino Luis Bravo's Forever Tango by Astor Piazzolla	
2017–2018	Tango de los Exilados performed by Vanessa-Mae	Romeo & Juliet composed by Abel Korzeniowski	
2016–2017	Stone Cold sung by Demi Lovato choreo. by Lee Kyu-hyun	The Notebook composed by Aaron Zigman choreo. by David Wilson	
2015–2016	Danse Macabre by Camille Saint-Saëns performed by Bolshoi Orchestra choreo. by Cindy Stuart	Buster's Big Opening (from Iris) by Danny Elfman choreo. by Cindy Stuart	Stone Cold sung by Demi Lovato choreo. by Lee Kyu-hyun
2014–2015	Clocks by Coldplay	Adiós Nonino Luis Bravo's Forever Tango by Astor Piazzolla	
2013–2014	Tetris Theme (from Korobeiniki) by London Philharmonic Orchestra and Andrew Skeet	Butterfly Lovers performed by Vanessa-Mae	
2012–2013	La Strada by Nino Rota	Porgy and Bess by George Gershwin	

== Competitive highlights ==
International
Event	13–14	14–15	15–16	16–17	17–18
CS Ice Star					3rd
Asian Open					4th
International: Junior
Junior Worlds				20th	
JGP Slovakia			8th		
JGP Spain			5th		
Autumn Classic				3rd	
National
South Korean Champ.	1st J	3rd	9th	7th	13th

== Detailed results ==
=== Senior ===
**2017–18 season**
Date	Event	SP	FS	Total
January 5–7, 2018	2018 South Korean Championships	20; 46.77	11; 106.92	13; 153.69
October 26–29, 2017	2017 CS Minsk-Arena Ice Star	1; **60.75**	3; **108.47**	3; **169.22**
August 2–5, 2017	2017 Asian Figure Skating Trophy	4; 45.74	4; 88.32	4; 134.06

=== Junior level ===
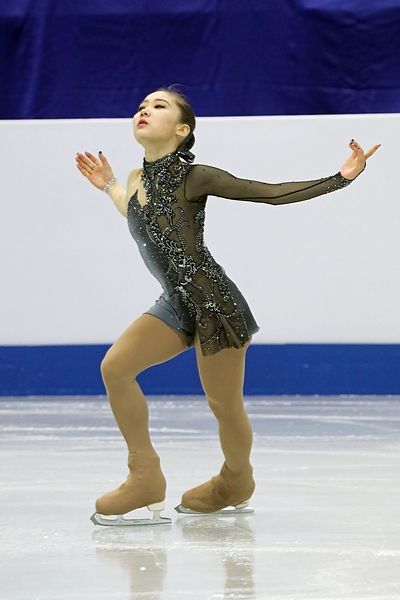
An at the 2017 World Junior Championships

**2016–17 season**
Date	Event	Level	SP	FS	Total
March 15–19, 2017	2017 World Junior Championships	Junior	17; 49.75	20; 77.07	20; 126.82
January 6–8, 2017	2017 South Korean Championships	Senior	7; 58.23	8; 110.45	7; 168.68
September 28 – October 1, 2016	2016 CS Autumn Classic	Junior	6; 43.32	3; 87.37	3; 130.69
**2015–16 season**
Date	Event	Level	SP	FS	Total
January 8–10, 2016	2016 South Korean Championships	Senior	8; 54.31	10; 100.28	9; 154.59
September 30 – October 4, 2015	2015 JGP Spain	Junior	6; 55.72	6; 97.74	5; 153.46
August 19–22, 2015	2015 JGP Slovakia	Junior	10; 40.29	8; 85.78	8; 126.07
**2014–15 season**
Date	Event	Level	SP	FS	Total
April 15–19, 2015	2015 Triglav Trophy	Novice	1; 40.72	1; 79.76	1; 120.48
January 7–9, 2015	2015 South Korean Championships	Senior	3; 53.33	3; 104.09	3; 157.42
August 6–10, 2014	2014 Asian Open Trophy	Novice	3; 39.06	4; 83.53	4; 122.59
**2013–14 season**
Date	Event	Level	SP	FS	Total
April 2–6, 2014	2014 Triglav Trophy	Novice	1; 39.60	1; 69.73	1; 109.33
January 3–5, 2014	2014 South Korean Championships	Junior	5; 45.76	1; 91.42	1; 137.18
**2012–13 season**
Date	Event	Level	SP	FS	Total
January 4–6, 2013	2013 South Korean Championships	Novice	2; 29.41	4; 49.77	2; 79.18

- Personal bests highlighted in **bold**.
