= Choi Ji-eun =

South Korean figure skater and coach (born 1988)

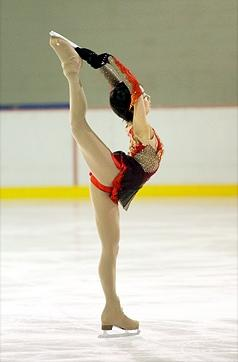
- Choi in January 2005

Personal information
- Born: May 25, 1988 (age 38) Daejeon, South Korea
- Height: 1.60 m (5 ft 3 in)

Figure skating career
- Country: South Korea
- Began skating: 1998
- Retired: 2010

- Choi Ji-eun
- Hangul: 최지은
- Hanja: 崔智恩
- RR: Choe Jieun
- MR: Ch'oe Chiŭn

Choi Ji-eun (Korean: 최지은; born May 25, 1988) is a South Korean figure skating coach and former competitor. She is a five-time South Korean national medalist, having won two silver and three bronze medals. She won the bronze medal at the 2006 ISU Junior Grand Prix in Hungary and reached the free skate at four ISU Championships.

== Personal life ==
Choi Ji-eun was born May 25, 1988, in Daejeon, South Korea. As a child, she learned to play the piano.

== Career ==
Choi began skating at age 10. From 2000, she was coached mainly by Shin Hea-sook in Seoul. She debuted on the ISU Junior Grand Prix series in late October 2002, placing 14th in Milan, Italy. She reached the free skate at the 2003 World Junior Championships in Ostrava by placing 13th in her qualifying group and 14th in the short program. She ranked 17th in the free skate and 18th overall.

During the summer of 2003, Choi trained in Colorado Springs, Colorado for two months, in preparation for the 2003–04 season. She became South Korea's senior national silver medalist. She injured her hip during the season.

Choi returned to Colorado Springs in the summer of 2004. Ranked 12th in the short program and 10th in the free skate, she finished 10th at the 2005 Four Continents Championships in Gangneung, South Korea. She advanced out of her qualifying group at the 2005 World Championships in Moscow, Russia, but was eliminated after placing 30th in the short program. She injured her knee and thigh during the season.

Ahead of the 2005–06 season, Choi again spent two months training in Colorado Springs. As the leading South Korean senior ladies' skater, she competed at the 2005 Karl Schäfer Memorial to qualify a spot for her country in the ladies' event at the 2006 Winter Olympics, but her placement, 11th, was insufficient. She sustained a serious ankle injury prior to the 2006 Four Continents Championships. She placed 17th in the short, 12th in the free, and 13th overall at Four Continents, held in Colorado Springs. At the 2006 World Championships in Calgary, she placed 20th in her qualifying group, which meant she did not advance to the short program.

In the summer of 2006, Choi trained under Josée Chouinard at the Granite Club in Toronto, Ontario, Canada. She won the bronze medal at the 2007 South Korean Championships among four senior ladies. Coached by Shin Hea-Sook at the start of 2006–07, she had switched to Lee Kyu-hyun by the end of the season. At the 2007 World Junior Championships, held in Oberstdorf, Germany, she placed 14th in the short program, 20th in the free skate, and 20th overall.

Choi has been credited with performing a flying layback spin in competition. She is one of the few skaters to achieve this distinction.

== Programs ==
| Season | Short program | Free skating | Exhibition |
|---|---|---|---|
| 2009–10 | Las cuatro estaciones portenas-Verano Porteno by Astor Piazzolla | Le cygne (from The Carnival of the Animals) by Camille Saint-Saëns | Las cuatro estaciones portenas-Verano Porteno by Astor Piazzolla |
| 2008-09 | Canon in D by Johann Pachelbel | Maria de Buenos Aires by Astor Piazzolla | |
| 2007-08 | Love Story by Francis Lai | Paganini / 24 Caprices Op.1; La Califfa by Ennio Morricone | |
| 2006–07 | Romeo and Juliet by Nino Rota choreo. by Yutaka Higuchi | Violin Concerto in D Minor, Opus 35 by Tchaikovski choreo. by Yutaka Higuchi | |
| 2005–06 | Serenade by Franz Peter Schubert choreo. by Lori Nichol, Shin Hea-sook | Menuette (from Terzetto Conceutante) by Niccolò Paganini; Concerto in D by Antonio Vivaldi; Adagio by Franz Schubert choreo. by Lori Nichol, Shin Hea-sook | |
| 2004–05 | Serenade by Franz Peter Schubert choreo. by Lori Nichol, Shin Amano | Le cygne (from The Carnival of the Animals) by Camille Saint-Saëns; Dumky Trio by Antonín Dvořák choreo. by Lori Nichol, Shin Amano | |
| 2003–04 | Shine by Bond; Libertango by Astor Piazzolla choreo. by Catarina Lindgren, Tom Dickson | Puccini without Words by Giacomo Puccini choreo. by Catarina Lindgren, Tom Dickson | |
| 2002–03 | Canon in D by Johann Pachelbel choreo. by Catarina Lindgren | Anna and the King by George Fenton choreo. by Catarina Lindgren | |

== Competitive highlights ==
International
| Event | 00–01 | 01–02 | 02–03 | 03–04 | 04–05 | 05–06 | 06–07 | 07–08 | 08–09 | 09–10 |
|---|---|---|---|---|---|---|---|---|---|---|
| Worlds | | | | 30th | 30th | 38th | | | | |
| Four Continents | | | | | 10th | 13th | | | | |
| Asian Games | | | | | | | 9th | | | |
| Nebelhorn | | | | | | | | | | 23rd |
| NRW Trophy | | | | | | | | | | 20th |
| Schäfer Memorial | | | | | | 11th | | | | |
| Universiade | | | | | | | 9th | | | |
International: Junior
| Junior Worlds | | | 18th | | | | 20th | | | |
| JGP Estonia | | | | | | 10th | | | | |
| JGP Hungary | | | | | | | 3rd | | | |
| JGP Italy | | | 14th | | | | | | | |
| JGP Japan | | | | | | 6th | | | | |
| JGP Mexico | | | | 6th | | | | | | |
| JGP Serbia | | | | | 9th | | | | | |
| JGP Taiwan | | | | | | | 4th | | | |
| JGP Ukraine | | | | | 15th | | | | | |
| Triglav Trophy | | 4th J. | | | | | | | | |
National
| South Korean | 2nd N. | 2nd J. | 3rd | 3rd | 2nd | 2nd | 3rd | 6th | WD | 6th |
Levels: N. = Novice, J. = Junior; WD: Withdrew
