= Shin Yea-ji (figure skater, born 1984) =

South Korean figure skater

Personal information
- Born: April 8, 1984 (age 42)
- Height: 155 cm (5 ft 1 in)

Figure skating career
- Country: South Korea
- Coach: Oh Ji-yeah
- Skating club: Dong Chun Winter Ice Academy
- Retired: 2003

- Shin Yea-ji
- Hangul: 신예지
- RR: Sin Yeji
- MR: Sin Yeji

Shin Yea-ji (born April 8, 1984) is a South Korean former competitive figure skater. She is the 1999 South Korean national champion and 2002 national silver medalist. She competed in the free skate at three ISU Championships. She was born in Seoul.

== Programs ==
Season	Short program	Free skating
2001–2002	Fantaisie-Impromptu by Frederic Chopin	Jalousie 'Tango Tzigane' by Jacob Gade; Tango Please by Rodriguez; Por una cabeza by Carlos Gardel
2000–2001	Miss Saigon Rhapsody for Piano and Orchestra by A. Inglis	Jalousie 'Tango Tzigane' by Jacob Gade; Tango Please by Rodriguez; Por una cabeza by Carlos Gardel

== Competitive highlights ==
JGP: ISU Junior Grand Prix

International
Event	95–96	96–97	97–98	98–99	99–00	00–01	01–02	02–03
Worlds							31st	
Four Continents						27th	20th	
Asian Games				8th				10th
International: Junior
Junior Worlds			19th	22nd				
JGP Hungary				12th				
National
South Korea	4th		1st	1st		4th	1st	5th
