= Kim Hae-kyung =

South Korean figure skater

Personal information
- Nationality: South Korean
- Born: 7 December 1950 (age 75) Seoul, South Korea

Sport
- Sport: Figure skating

Kim Hae-kyung (born 7 December 1950) is a South Korean figure skater. She competed in the ladies' singles event at the 1968 Winter Olympics.

Kim was the first Korean figure skater to compete at the Olympics. She disputed the scoring that placed her 31st out of 32 competitors, saying in Korean that it was "ridiculous".
