= Park Se-bin =

South Korean figure skater

Park Se-Bin
Personal information
- Born: October 23, 2000 (age 26) Seoul, South Korea
- Height: 1.62 m (5 ft 4 in)

Figure skating career
- Country: (South Korea) Republic of Korea
- Coach: Hyun Jung Chi

- Park Se-bin
- Hangul: 박세빈
- RR: Bak Sebin
- MR: Pak Sebin

Park Se-Bin (born October 23, 2000) is a South Korean figure skater.

== Career ==
=== 2015-2016 ===
Park competed at the JGP Qualification competition held in South Korea and placed 7th place with total score 136.80, so she was given a spot for the JGP series. She placed 7th with total score 131.55 at her first ISU competition.

== Programs ==
| Season | Short program | Free skating |
|---|---|---|
| 2015–2016 | Masquerade by Aram Khachaturian | Salome by Richard Strauss |
| 2014–2015 | Masquerade by Aram Khachaturian | Carmen by Georges Bizet |
| 2013–2014 | Flower by Hiroyuki Sawano | Tango Jalousie by Jacob Gade |
| 2012–2013 | Nyah by Hans Zimmer | Piano Concerto No.2 in C minor Op.18 by Sergei Rachmaninoff |
| 2011–2012 | | Méditation by Jules Massenet |

== Competitive highlights ==
=== 2011–present ===
Results
International
| Event | 2011–12 | 2012–13 | 2013–14 | 2014–15 | 2015–16 |
|---|---|---|---|---|---|
| JGP Austria | | | | | 7th |
National
| South Korean | | 14th N. | 7th J. | 14th | 14th |
JGP = Junior Grand Prix; Levels: J. = Junior; N. = Novice
