= Ji Min-ji =

South Korean figure skater (born 1999)

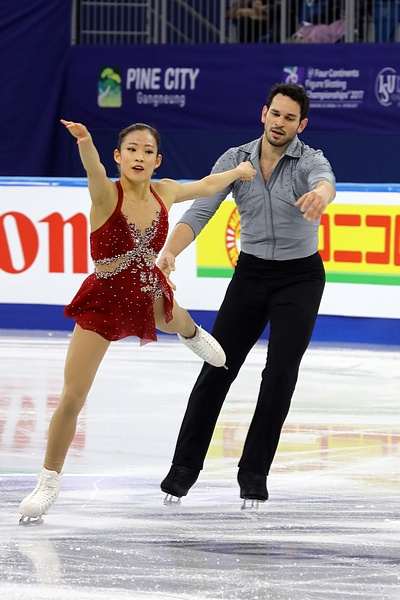

Personal information
- Native name: 지민지
- Born: March 4, 1999 (age 27) South Korea

Figure skating career
- Country: South Korea
- Partner: Themistocles Leftheris
- Coach: Naomi Nari Nam
- Skating club: Taeneung

Ji Min-ji (Korean: 지민지; born March 4, 1999) is a South Korean figure skater who currently competes in ladies' singles and pair skating. With partner Themistocles Leftheris, she is a two-time (2016, 2017) South Korean national champion and competed in the free skate at the 2017 Four Continents Championships. They teamed up in 2015.

== Programs ==
(with Leftheris)

Season	Short program	Free skating
2016–2017	Angels & Demons by Hans Zimmer	Spectre by Thomas Newman

== Competitive highlights ==
GP: Grand Prix; CS: Challenger Series

=== Pairs with Leftheris ===
International
Event	15–16	16–17
Worlds		WD
Four Continents		14th
CS Golden Spin		7th
CS Lombardia Trophy		6th
National
South Korean Champ.	1st	1st

=== Ladies' singles ===
International
Event	14–15	15–16	16–17	17–18	18–19	19–20
CS Golden Spin					21st	
National
South Korean Champ.	13th J			5th J	6th J	10th J
J = Junior level
