= Byun Sung-jin =

South Korean figure skater (born 1970)

Personal information
- Nationality: South Korean
- Born: 10 November 1970 (age 54)

Sport
- Sport: Figure skating

Byun Sung-jin (born 10 November 1970) is a South Korean figure skater. She competed in the ladies' singles event at the 1988 Winter Olympics.

She later became a figure skating commentator for KBS World Radio.
