= Lee Ho-jung (figure skater) =

South Korean ice dancer (born 1997)

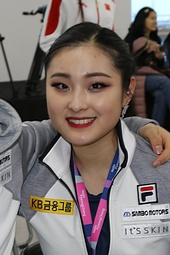

Personal information
- Born: March 15, 1997 (age 29) Seoul, South Korea
- Height: 1.63 m (5 ft 4 in)

Figure skating career
- Country: South Korea
- Skating club: Gwacheon
- Began skating: 2005
- Retired: April 3, 2017

- Lee Ho-jung
- Hangul: 이호정
- RR: I Hojeong
- MR: I Hojŏng

Lee Ho-jung (Korean: 이호정; born March 15, 1997) is a South Korean retired ice dancer. With partner Richard Kang-in Kam, she is a two-time national medalist and has competed in the free dance at four ISU Championships. She announced on April 3, 2017 that their partnership has been dissolved.

== Career ==
=== Single skating ===
Lee began skating in 2005. As a single skater, she was coached by Choi Hyung-kyung and Shin Hea-sook in Seoul. She qualified to the free skate at the 2011 World Junior Championships and finished 23rd overall.

=== Ice dancing ===
Lee teamed up with Richard Kang-in Kam in September 2014. At the 2015 World Junior Championships in Tallinn, Estonia, they qualified to the final segment by placing 20th in the short dance and went on to finish 19th overall.

Lee/Kam made their senior international debut in February 2016 at the Four Continents Championships in Taipei, Taiwan; they ranked 11th in the short dance, 9th in the free dance, and 10th overall. In March, they placed 14th at the 2016 World Junior Championships in Debrecen, Hungary.

=== Post-competitive career ===
In addition to continuing her education at Sungshin Women's University, Lee works as a skating coach.

== Programs ==
=== With Kam ===
Season	Short dance	Free dance
2016–2017	Blues: Creep by Radiohead covered by Postmodern Jukebox; Swing: That Man by Caro Emerald	Stairway to Heaven; Kashimir by Led Zeppelin
2015–2016	Waltz: La traviata by Giuseppe Verdi	Tango Amore by Edvin Marton; Tango de los Exilados by Vanessa-Mae
2014–2015	Rhumba: Pyramids of Pleasure; Samba: La Bomba	That's Life by Dean Kay and Kelly Gordon; The Lady Is a Tramp by Rodgers and Hart

=== Single skating ===
Season	Short program	Free skating	Exhibition
2011–2012	Buenos Aires Tango Summer	Introduction and Rondo Capriccioso by Camille Saint-Saëns	
2010–2011	Over the Rainbow	Fire Bird	I Dreamed a Dream performed by Idina Menzel

== Competitive highlights ==
=== With Kam ===
International
Event	14–15	15–16	16–17
Four Continents		10th	13th
Asian Games			4th
Open d'Andorra			6th
International: Junior
Junior Worlds	19th	14th	
JGP Slovakia		4th	
JGP USA		7th	
Tallinn Trophy	4th J		
National
South Korean	1st J	3rd	2nd
J = Junior level; JGP = Junior Grand Prix

=== Single skating ===
International
Event	10–11	11–12	12–13	13–14
World Junior Champ.	23rd			
JGP Japan	6th			
JGP Latvia		12th		
JGP Romania	9th			
Asian Trophy		5th J		
National
South Korean Champ.	5th	5th	17th	26th
J = Junior level; JGP = Junior Grand Prix
