= Kim Min-seok (figure skater) =

South Korean figure skater

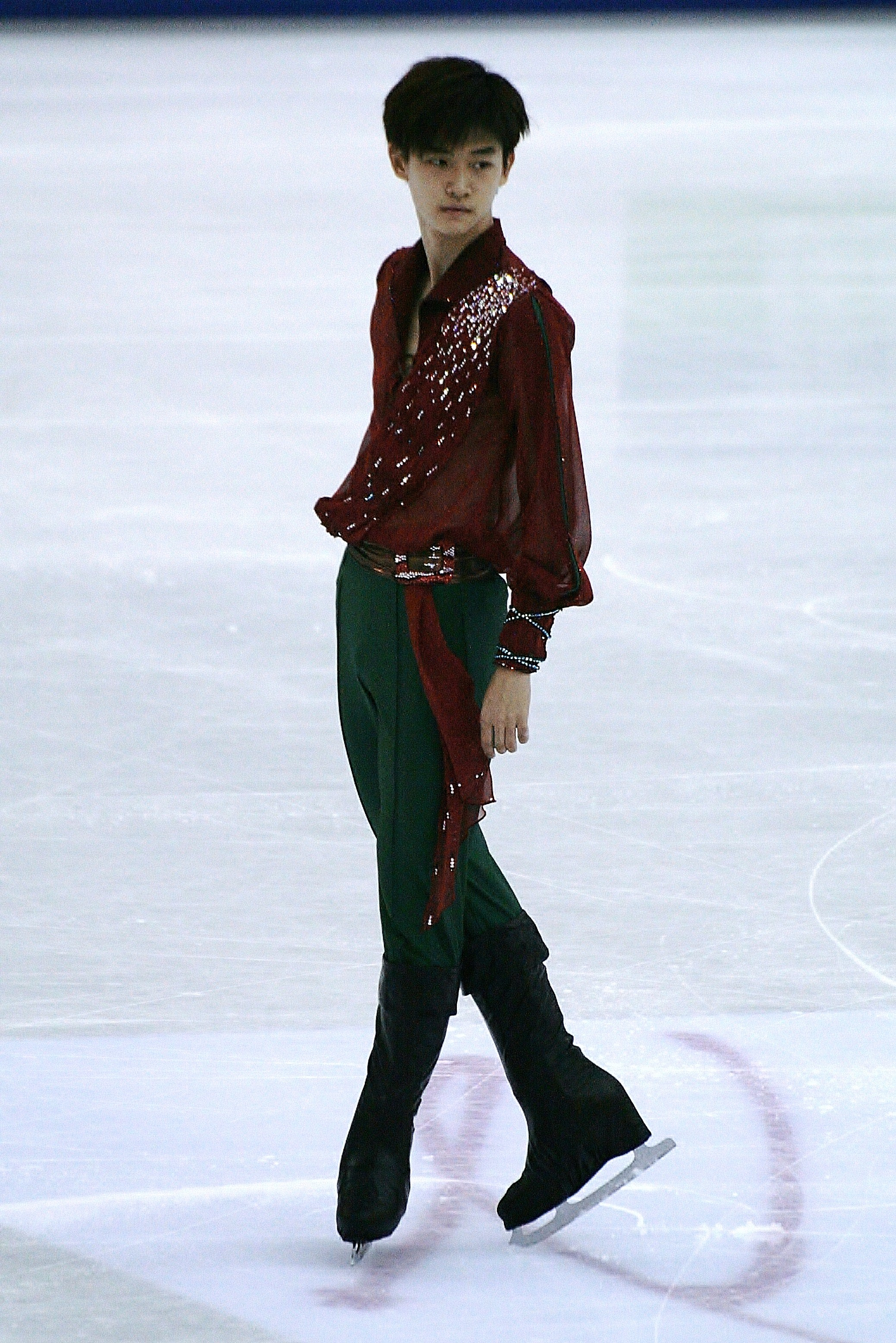
- Kim at the 2012 worlds

Personal information
- Full name: Kim Min-seok
- Born: February 19, 1993 (age 33) Daejeon, South Korea
- Height: 1.71 m (5 ft 7 in)

Figure skating career
- Country: South Korea
- Began skating: 1999
- Retired: January 9, 2015
Medal record
Representing South Korea
Men's Single: Figure skating
Asian Figure Skating Trophy
Silver medal – second place	2012 Taipei	Men's singles
Bronze medal – third place	2008 Hong Kong	Men's singles
South Korean Championships
Gold medal – first place	2009 Goyang	Men's singles
Gold medal – first place	2010 Seoul	Men's singles
Silver medal – second place	2011 Seoul	Men's singles
Bronze medal – third place	2012 Seoul	Men's singles

Kim Min-seok (Korean: 김민석, born February 19, 1993) is a South Korean former figure skater. He is the 2012 Asian Trophy silver medalist, and a two-time (2009, 2010) South Korean national champion. He is the first Korean skater to land a triple Axel in ISU competition.

== Programs ==
Season	Short program	Free skating	Exhibition
2014–2015	Cello Wars (Star Wars Parody) Lightsaber Duel by The Piano Guys	Triangle Tango; Quidam (from Cirque du Soleil)	
2013–2014	Cello Wars (Star Wars Parody) Lightsaber Duel by The Piano Guys	Triangle Tango; Quidam (from Cirque du Soleil)	
2012–2013	Conquest of Paradise by Vangelis	Triangle Tango; Quidam (from Cirque du Soleil)	
2011–2012	The Pirate That Should Not Be (from Pirates of the Caribbean) by Hans Zimmer	Triangle Tango; Quidam (from Cirque du Soleil)	
2010–2011	Bolero (from Moulin Rouge!) by Steve Sharples performed by Craig Armstrong	Chess by Benny Andersson, Björn Ulvaeus	
2009–2010	Boléro by Maurice Ravel	Flamenco Rhapsody by Walter G. Samuels	Inside Out by Bryan Adams
2008–2009	The X-Files by Mark Snow	Cinema Paradiso by Ennio Morricone	Maria (from West Side Story); Love For You by Calvin Harris
2007–2008	La traviata by Giuseppe Verdi	Pirates of the Caribbean by Klaus Badelt, Hans Zimmer	
2006–2007	La traviata by Giuseppe Verdi	Grieg's Piano Concerto In A by Maksim Mrvica	

== Competitive highlights ==
International
Event	06–07	07–08	08–09	09–10	10–11	11–12	12–13	13–14	14–15
Worlds			39th	23rd	27th	27th			
Four Continents			19th	14th	15th	15th	20th		
Nebelhorn Trophy				20th		16th			
Universiade								8th	
Asian Games					9th				
Asian Trophy			3rd			4th	2nd		
NZ Games			1st						
International: Junior
Junior Worlds	33rd	39th	22nd	25th					
JGP Austria		23rd			11th				
JGP Croatia				14th					
JGP Germany					12th				
JGP Mexico			9th						
JGP Norway	20th								
JGP Taiwan	13th								
JGP Turkey				11th					
JGP United States		13th							
National
South Korean Champ.	1st J	1st J	1st	1st	2nd	3rd	5th	4th	4th
Ranking Comp.	2nd	2nd	1st	1st	2nd	2nd	2nd	4th	4th
J = Junior level; JGP = Junior Grand Prix
