= 2020 South Korean Figure Skating Championships =

Figure skating competition

- Type: National championship
- Date: January 3 – 5, 2020
- Season: 2019–20
- Location: Uijeongbu, South Korea
- Host: Korean Skating Union
- Venue: Uijeongbu Indoor Ice Rink

Champions
- Men's singles: Cha Jun-hwan (S); Jeong Deok-hoon (J)
- Ladies' singles: You Young (S); Seo Hee-won (J)
- Ice dance: Yura Min / Daniel Eaton (S); Jeon Jeong-eun / Choi Sung-min (J)
- Previous: 2019 South Korean Championships
- Next: 2021 South Korean Championships

The 2020 South Korean Figure Skating Championships were held from January 3–5, 2020 at the Uijeongbu Indoor Ice Rink in Uijeongbu. It was the 74th edition of the event. Medals were awarded in the disciplines of men's singles, ladies' singles, and ice dance on the senior and junior levels. The results were part of the Korean selection criteria for the 2020 World Junior Championships and the 2020 World Championships.

Seoul was originally announced as the host, before the location was changed to Uijeongbu in November 2019.

== Medal summary ==
=== Senior ===
| Discipline | Gold | Silver | Bronze |
|---|---|---|---|
| Men | Cha Jun-hwan | Lee Si-hyeong | Lee June-hyoung |
| Ladies | You Young | Lee Hae-in | Kim Ye-lim |
| Ice dance | Yura Min / Daniel Eaton | no other competitors | |

=== Junior ===
| Discipline | Gold | Silver | Bronze |
|---|---|---|---|
| Men | Jeong Deok-hoon | Lee Jun-hyuk | Kim Hyun-gyeom |
| Ladies | Seo Hee-won | Song Si-woo | Kang Joo-ha |
| Ice dance | Jeon Jeong-eun / Choi Sung-min | no other competitors | |

== Senior-level results ==
=== Men ===
| Rank | Name | Total points | SP | | FS | |
|---|---|---|---|---|---|---|
| 1 | Cha Jun-hwan | 278.54 | 1 | 93.45 | 1 | 185.09 |
| 2 | Lee Si-hyeong | 231.04 | 3 | 77.72 | 2 | 153.22 |
| 3 | Lee June-hyoung | 226.52 | 2 | 82.70 | 3 | 143.82 |
| 4 | Cha Young-hyun | 197.80 | 5 | 64.31 | 4 | 133.49 |
| 5 | Kyeong Jae-seok | 191.84 | 4 | 66.17 | 5 | 125.67 |
| 6 | Kim Han-gil | 168.77 | 6 | 57.28 | 7 | 111.49 |
| 7 | Park Sung-hoon | 167.12 | 7 | 55.64 | 8 | 111.48 |
| 8 | An Geon-hyeong | 165.30 | 8 | 54.26 | 9 | 111.04 |
| 9 | Park Geon-woo | 162.11 | 10 | 47.98 | 6 | 114.13 |
| 10 | Lee Dong-hyeok | 160.82 | 9 | 52.63 | 10 | 108.19 |

=== Ladies ===
| Rank | Name | Total points | SP | | FS | |
|---|---|---|---|---|---|---|
| 1 | You Young | 220.20 | 1 | 76.53 | 1 | 143.67 |
| 2 | Lee Hae-in | 204.56 | 2 | 68.20 | 2 | 136.36 |
| 3 | Kim Ye-lim | 199.31 | 3 | 64.41 | 3 | 134.90 |
| 4 | Wi Seo-yeong | 187.54 | 6 | 63.32 | 5 | 124.22 |
| 5 | Kim Ha-nul | 187.45 | 7 | 63.17 | 4 | 124.28 |
| 6 | Ji Seo-yeon | 186.27 | 5 | 63.55 | 6 | 122.72 |
| 7 | Lim Eun-soo | 182.58 | 4 | 63.95 | 7 | 118.63 |
| 8 | Yun Ah-sun | 176.05 | 10 | 58.88 | 8 | 117.17 |
| 9 | Park Yeon-jeong | 175.98 | 8 | 60.11 | 9 | 115.87 |
| 10 | To Ji-hun | 170.30 | 9 | 58.98 | 10 | 111.32 |
| 11 | Choi Yu-jin | 152.32 | 13 | 52.09 | 12 | 100.23 |
| 12 | Kim Min-chae | 151.98 | 14 | 50.68 | 11 | 101.30 |
| 13 | Jeon Su-been | 151.85 | 12 | 52.51 | 13 | 99.34 |
| 14 | Won Chae-eun | 148.51 | 15 | 50.16 | 15 | 98.35 |
| 15 | Lee Hyun-soo | 147.89 | 11 | 54.02 | 19 | 93.87 |
| 16 | Mo Ji-won | 147.22 | 16 | 49.72 | 16 | 97.50 |
| 17 | Lee Si-won | 144.58 | 19 | 48.40 | 17 | 96.18 |
| 18 | Moon Bo-in | 143.75 | 22 | 45.28 | 14 | 98.47 |
| 19 | Choi Hyun-soo | 143.52 | 18 | 48.59 | 18 | 94.93 |
| 20 | Kim Seo-young (APR25) | 130.85 | 20 | 47.95 | 20 | 82.90 |
| 21 | Seo Ye-eun | 128.78 | 21 | 47.34 | 21 | 81.44 |
| 22 | Choi So-eun | 126.67 | 17 | 48.94 | 23 | 77.73 |
| 23 | Kim Seo-young (APR28) | 124.71 | 23 | 44.12 | 22 | 80.59 |
| 24 | Lee Eun-seo | 120.76 | 24 | 44.07 | 24 | 76.69 |
Did not advance to free skating
| 25 | Noh Chae-eun | 40.22 | 25 | 40.22 | —N/a | |
| 26 | Kang Soo-min | 40.11 | 26 | 40.11 | —N/a | |
| 27 | Kwak Mun-ju | 39.64 | 27 | 39.64 | —N/a | |
| 28 | Lee Yu-rim | 37.02 | 28 | 37.02 | —N/a | |
| 29 | Park Mi-seon | 36.85 | 29 | 36.85 | —N/a | |
| 30 | Kim Hyun-soo | 36.73 | 30 | 36.73 | —N/a | |
| 31 | Jeong Min-kyoung | 34.69 | 31 | 34.69 | —N/a | |
| 32 | Lee Seo-young | 31.33 | 32 | 31.33 | —N/a | |
| WD | Choi Da-bin | withdrew | withdrew from competition | | | |
| WD | Jeon Gyo-hee | withdrew | withdrew from competition | | | |
| WD | Joung Min-seo | withdrew | withdrew from competition | | | |
| WD | Min Seo-hyun | withdrew | withdrew from competition | | | |

=== Ice dance ===
| Rank | Name | Total points | RD | | FD | |
|---|---|---|---|---|---|---|
| 1 | Yura Min / Daniel Eaton | 169.46 | 1 | 67.23 | 1 | 102.23 |

== Junior-level results ==
=== Men ===
| Rank | Name | Total points | SP | | FS | |
|---|---|---|---|---|---|---|
| 1 | Jeong Deok-hoon | 152.09 | 1 | 49.68 | 1 | 102.41 |
| 2 | Lee Jun-hyuk | 137.91 | 2 | 44.86 | 2 | 93.05 |
| 3 | Kim Hyun-gyeom | 133.60 | 3 | 42.93 | 3 | 90.67 |
| 4 | Park Hyeon-seo | 103.42 | 4 | 32.69 | 4 | 70.73 |

=== Ladies ===
| Rank | Name | Total points | SP | | FS | |
|---|---|---|---|---|---|---|
| 1 | Seo Hee-won | 157.06 | 1 | 54.59 | 1 | 102.47 |
| 2 | Song Si-woo | 150.07 | 2 | 49.57 | 2 | 100.50 |
| 3 | Kang Joo-ha | 134.86 | 6 | 44.92 | 3 | 89.94 |
| 4 | Kim Chae-yeon | 134.58 | 4 | 46.08 | 4 | 88.50 |
| 5 | Hwang Chae-bin | 127.50 | 3 | 47.48 | 5 | 80.02 |
| 6 | Kang Eun-soo | 123.53 | 5 | 45.61 | 6 | 77.92 |
| 7 | Jung Ye-an | 121.52 | 9 | 43.93 | 7 | 77.59 |
| 8 | Jeon Ah-ran | 116.14 | 8 | 44.28 | 9 | 71.86 |
| 9 | Yook Jeong-min | 115.01 | 10 | 43.51 | 10 | 71.50 |
| 10 | Ji Min-ji | 114.95 | 7 | 44.75 | 11 | 70.20 |
| 11 | Shim So-i | 113.31 | 15 | 38.85 | 8 | 74.46 |
| 12 | Kim He-suh | 109.35 | 11 | 40.63 | 13 | 68.72 |
| 13 | Lee Yea-lin | 106.69 | 13 | 39.52 | 14 | 67.17 |
| 14 | Bae Min-ji | 103.82 | 24 | 34.35 | 12 | 69.47 |
| 15 | Park Sa-rang | 103.47 | 16 | 38.13 | 15 | 65.34 |
| 16 | Kang Yeon-woo | 103.18 | 12 | 39.66 | 18 | 63.52 |
| 17 | Sara Hong | 101.27 | 21 | 36.55 | 16 | 64.72 |
| 18 | Kim Na-yeon | 100.09 | 22 | 36.49 | 17 | 63.60 |
| 19 | Lee Ji-yun | 98.35 | 20 | 36.65 | 19 | 61.70 |
| 20 | Kim Gyu-ri | 97.54 | 19 | 36.70 | 20 | 60.84 |
| 21 | Ko Soon-jung | 97.43 | 18 | 37.36 | 21 | 60.07 |
| 22 | Baek Kum-gyung | 97.20 | 14 | 39.19 | 22 | 58.01 |
| 23 | Oh Ae-jin | 92.90 | 23 | 34.89 | 23 | 58.01 |
| 24 | Jang Eun-sol | 88.59 | 17 | 37.66 | 24 | 50.93 |
Did not advance to free skating
| 25 | Kim Min-sun | 33.95 | 25 | 33.95 | —N/a | |
| 26 | Jung Chae-yoon | 33.08 | 26 | 33.08 | —N/a | |
| 27 | Hong Young-seo | 32.54 | 27 | 32.54 | —N/a | |
| 28 | Ahn Ji-hye | 32.29 | 28 | 32.29 | —N/a | |
| 29 | Park Ha-yeon | 31.89 | 29 | 31.89 | —N/a | |
| 30 | Jeon Yi-been | 31.83 | 30 | 31.83 | —N/a | |
| 31 | Lee Gi-o | 31.81 | 31 | 31.81 | —N/a | |
| 32 | Kwon Seong-gyeong | 31.27 | 32 | 31.27 | —N/a | |
| 33 | Lim Seo-hee | 31.12 | 33 | 31.12 | —N/a | |
| 34 | Jeong Min-ji | 30.94 | 34 | 30.94 | —N/a | |
| 35 | Park Do-hyeon | 30.73 | 35 | 30.73 | —N/a | |
| 36 | Kim So-hee | 30.06 | 36 | 30.06 | —N/a | |
| 37 | Shin Yun-jin | 29.68 | 37 | 29.68 | —N/a | |
| 38 | Kwon Ye-eun | 28.87 | 38 | 28.87 | —N/a | |
| 39 | Shin Ji-eun | 29.75 | 39 | 29.75 | —N/a | |

=== Ice dance ===
| Rank | Name | Total points | RD | | FD | |
|---|---|---|---|---|---|---|
| 1 | Jeon Jeong-eun / Choi Sung-min | 118.37 | 1 | 44.91 | 1 | 73.46 |

== International team selections ==
=== World Championships ===
The 2020 World Figure Skating Championships will be held in Montreal, Quebec, Canada from March 16–22, 2020.

| | Men | Ladies | Pairs | Ice dance |
|---|---|---|---|---|
| 1 | Cha Jun-hwan | You Young | | Yura Min / Daniel Eaton |
| 2 | | Kim Ye-lim | | |
| Alt. | Lee Si-hyeong | Lim Eun-soo | | |

=== Four Continents Championships ===
The 2020 Four Continents Figure Skating Championships will be held in Seoul, South Korea from February 4–9, 2020. The team was announced following an internal ranking competition in December 2019. Lee Hae-in placed second in the ladies' singles competition, but was age-ineligible to be chosen for the team.

| | Men | Ladies | Pairs | Ice dance |
|---|---|---|---|---|
| 1 | Cha Jun-hwan | Kim Ye-lim | | Yura Min / Daniel Eaton |
| 2 | Lee Si-hyeong | Lim Eun-soo | | |
| 3 | Lee June-hyoung | You Young | | |
| 1st alt. | Cha Young-hyun | Kim Ha-nul | | |
| 2nd alt. | Kyeong Jae-seok | Choi Da-bin | | |
| 3rd alt. | Byun Se-jong | To Ji-hun | | |

=== World Junior Championships ===
Commonly referred to as "Junior Worlds", the 2020 World Junior Figure Skating Championships will take place in Tallinn, Estonia from March 2–8, 2020.

| | Men | Ladies | Pairs | Ice dance |
|---|---|---|---|---|
| 1 | Lee Si-hyeong | Lee Hae-in | | |
| 2 | | Wi Seo-yeong | | |
| Alt. | Cha Young-hyun | Ji Seo-yeon | | |

=== Winter Youth Olympics ===
The 2020 Winter Youth Olympics will be held in Lausanne, Switzerland from January 10–15, 2020. The team was announced on October 13, 2019.

| | Men | Ladies | Pairs | Ice dance |
|---|---|---|---|---|
| 1 | Cha Young-hyun | You Young | | |
| Alt. | | | | |
