= To Ji-hun =

South Korean figure skater (born 2003)

Personal information
- Born: August 11, 2003 (age 22) Seoul, South Korea
- Home town: Seoul, South Korea
- Height: 1.69 m (5 ft 6 1/2 in)

Figure skating career
- Country: South Korea
- Coach: Lee Eun-hee
- Began skating: 2010

Korean name
- Hangul: 도지훈
- RR: Do Jihun
- MR: To Chihun

To Ji-hun (Korean: 도지훈; born August 11, 2003) is a South Korean figure skater. She is the 2015 South Korean Figure Skating Championships junior silver medalist and also 2016 FBMA Trophy novice silver medalist.

== Programs ==
Season	Short program	Free skating
2019–2020	Ashes performed by Celine Dion choreo by Karen Kwan	The Storm composed by Balázs Havasi choreo by Karen Kwan
2018–2019	Historia de un Amor choreo by David Wilson	Madama Butterfly composed by Giacomo Puccini choreo by David Wilson
2017–2018	Primavera Portena composed by Astor Piazzolla choreo by Karen Kwan	Madama Butterfly composed by Giacomo Puccini choreo by David Wilson
2016–2017	Primavera Portena composed by Astor Piazzolla choreo by Karen Kwan	Turandot composed by Giacomo Puccini choreo by Karen Kwan
2015–2016	Burlesque sung by Christina Aguilera and Cher	Trio élégiaque in D minor, Opus 9 composed by Sergei Rachmaninoff
2014–2015	Krwing performed by Myleene Klass choreo. by Shin Yea-Ji	Bolero by Flamenka; Firedance composed by Bill Whelan choreo. by Shin Yea-Ji
2013–2014	The Cotton Club composed by John Barry	Symphonic Sketches: III. Hobgoblin: Scherzo capriccioso composed by George Whitefield Chadwick
2012–2013		Lautarian performed by KoN
2011–2012		Canon in Memoriam Igor Stravinsky composed by Alfred Schnittke

== Competitive highlights ==
JGP: Junior Grand Prix

International
Event	14–15	15–16	16–17	17–18	18–19	19–20	20–21
CS Warsaw Cup						9th	
International: Junior
JGP Belarus				11th			
JGP Canada					5th		
JGP France						9th	
JGP Russia						14th	
JGP Slovakia					7th		
Golden Bear					5th		
Prague Ice Cup				2nd			
International: Novice
FBMA Trophy		2nd					
Mexican Open			1st				
National
South Korean Champ.	2nd J	22nd	10th	7th	8th	10th	
Levels: N = Novice; J = Junior; WD = Withdrew

== Detailed results ==
**2019–20 season**
Date	Event	Level	SP	FS	Total
February 24–26, 2021	2021 South Korean Championships	Senior	14; 51.62	22; 73.89	19; 125.51
**2019–20 season**
Date	Event	Level	SP	FS	Total
January 3–5, 2020	2020 South Korean Championships	Senior	9; 58.98	10; 111.32	10; 170.30
November 14–17, 2019	2019 CS Warsaw Cup	Senior	4; 59.61	9; **108.05**	9; **167.66**
September 11–14, 2019	2019 JGP Russia	Junior	10; 53.04	16; 88.67	14; 141.71
August 21–24, 2019	2019 JGP France	Junior	9; 55.70	12; 96.07	9; 151.77
**2018–19 season**
Date	Event	Level	SP	FS	Total
January 11–13, 2019	2019 South Korean Championships	Senior	6; 60.12	11; 102.48	8; 162.60
October 24–28, 2018	2018 Golden Bear of Zagreb	Junior	8; 49.14	4; 106.76	5; 155.90
September 12–15, 2018	2018 JGP Canada	Junior	3; **60.74**	5; 104.22	5; 164.96
August 22–25, 2018	2018 JGP Slovakia	Junior	7; 56.68	7; 105.72	7; 162.40
2017–18 season
Date	Event	Level	SP	FS	Total
January 5–7, 2018	2018 South Korean Championships	Senior	13; 51.30	3; 120.81	7; 172.11
November 10–12, 2017	Prague Riedell Ice Cup	Junior	1; 56.00	2; 83.11	2; 139.11
September 20–24, 2017	2017 JGP Belarus	Junior	10; 44.21	8; 87.71	11; 131.92
2016–17 season
Date	Event	Level	SP	FS	Total
January 6–8, 2017	2017 South Korean Championships	Senior	16; 49.89	10; 105.67	10; 155.56
2015–16 season
Date	Event	Level	SP	FS	Total
January 21–23, 2013	2016 FBMA Trophy	Novice	2; 36.86	2; 65.13	2; 101.99
January 8–10, 2016	2016 South Korean Championships	Senior	21; 47.08	22; 81.02	22; 128.10
2014–15 season
January 7–9, 2015	2015 South Korean Championships	Junior	13; 40.23	1; 87.30	2; 127.53

- Personal best highlighted in **bold**.
