= Park Yeon-jeong =

South Korean figure skater (born 2006)

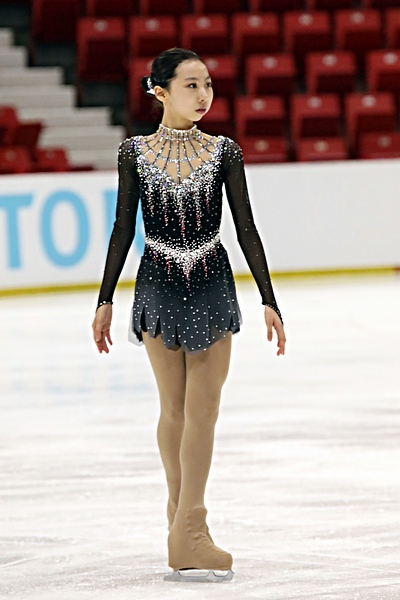
- Park at the 2019 JGP United States

Personal information
- Native name: 박연정
- Other names: Yeon-jung
- Born: January 19, 2006 (age 20) Seoul, South Korea
- Home town: Seoul
- Height: 1.63 m (5 ft 4 in)

Figure skating career
- Country: South Korea
- Coach: Hong Ye-seul
- Skating club: Kwangwoon University
- Began skating: 2013

Park Yeon-jeong (Korean: 박연정; born January 19, 2006) is a South Korean figure skater. She is the 2021 CS Cup of Austria silver medalist and 2021 U.S. Classic silver medalist. On the junior level, she is the 2019 JGP United States silver medalist and the 2019 South Korean junior national champion.

== Personal life ==
Park was born on January 19, 2006, in Seoul, South Korea.

== Career ==
=== Early career ===
Park began skating in 2013. She is the 2019 South Korean junior national champion. Park is considered part of the second generation of "Yuna Kids," South Korean ladies who began skating after being inspired by 2010 Olympic Champion Yuna Kim.

=== 2019–2020 season ===
Park placed fifth in the Korean Junior Grand Prix selection competition in July to earn two JGP quotas. At her first Junior Grand Prix event in the United States, she won silver behind American Alysa Liu and ahead of Russia's Anastasia Tarakanova. Park was the first Korean lady to medal in her JGP debut since Yuna Kim in 2004. She finished fifth at her second event in Italy and did not qualify for the 2019–20 Junior Grand Prix Final. Park competed at the senior level at the 2020 South Korean Championships and finished ninth.

=== 2020–2021 season ===
Due to the COVID-19 pandemic, the 2020–21 ISU Junior Grand Prix series, where Park would have competed, was cancelled. With international competitive opportunities limited for South Korean skaters, Park finished eighth at the 2021 South Korean Championships.

=== 2021–2022 season ===
Park did not compete on the 2021–22 ISU Junior Grand Prix series, instead opting to make her senior international debut at the 2021 U.S. International Classic. She earned the silver medal at the event by four points behind Russian Alexandra Trusova. Competing on the Challenger series, Park won the silver medal at the 2021 CS Cup of Austria. On November 8 she was assigned to make her Grand Prix debut at the 2021 Internationaux de France, replacing Maïa Mazzara. She finished eighth at the event.

=== 2022–2023 season ===
After winning gold at the SEA Open Trophy, Park made her senior Grand Prix debut at the 2022 Skate America, finishing in eighth place.

== Programs ==
Season	Short program	Free skating
2023–2024	The Whole Nine Yards ~ Opening Title ~ (from Calmi Cuori Appassionati) by Ryo Yoshimata choreo. by Rebeka Kim	
2022–2023	Ballade No. 4 by Frédéric Chopin choreo. by David Wilson	Hymne à l'amour by Édith Piaf choreo. by Pasquale Camerlengo
2021–2022	Ballade No. 4 by Frédéric Chopin choreo. by David Wilson	Hymne à l'amour by Édith Piaf choreo. by Pasquale Camerlengo
2020–2021	Faith (from Sing) by Stevie Wonder, Ariana Grande	Catwoman by Klaus Badelt
2019–2020	I'll Never Love Again (from A Star Is Born) by Lady Gaga choreo. by Kim Hyun-jeong	Lost Girls; The Arena by Lindsey Stirling choreo. by Karen Kwan

== Competitive highlights ==
GP: Grand Prix; CS: Challenger Series; JGP: Junior Grand Prix

International
Event	18–19	19–20	20–21	21–22	22–23
GP France				8th	
GP Skate America					8th
CS Cup of Austria				2nd	
CS Warsaw Cup				WD	
SEA Open Trophy					1st
U.S. Classic				2nd	
International: Junior
JGP Italy		5th			
JGP U.S.		2nd			
National
South Korean	1st J	9th	8th	13th	WD
Ranking Comp.		26th	15th	9th	19th
TBD = Assigned; WD = Withdrew; Levels: J = Junior

== Detailed results ==
=== Senior Level ===
2022–23 season
Date	Event	SP	FS	Total
October 21–23, 2022	2022 Skate America	7; 60.04	9; 98.54	8; 158.58
September 2–4, 2022	2022 SEA Open Trophy	1; 49.55	2; 86.62	1; 136.17
2021–22 season
Date	Event	SP	FS	Total
January 7–9, 2022	2022 South Korean Championships	13; 56.48	12; 107.42	13; 163.90
November 19–21, 2021	2021 Internationaux de France	4; 67.00	9; 119.11	8; 186.11
November 11–14, 2021	2021 CS Cup of Austria	2; 57.84	1; 126.23	2; 184.07
September 15–18, 2021	2021 U.S. International Classic	2; 71.07	2; 141.33	2; 212.40

=== Junior Level ===
2020–21 season
Date	Event	Level	SP	FS	Total
February 24–26, 2021	2021 South Korean Championships	Senior	7; 62.08	7; 112.11	8; 174.19
2019–20 season
Date	Event	Level	SP	FS	Total
January 3–5, 2020	2020 South Korean Championships	Senior	8; 60.11	9; 115.87	9; 175.98
October 2–5, 2019	2019 JGP Italy	Junior	12; 48.27	3; 115.55	5; 163.82
August 28–31, 2019	2019 JGP United States	Junior	3; 64.35	2; 122.23	2; 186.58
2018–19 season
Date	Event	Level	SP	FS	Total
January 11–13, 2019	2019 South Korean Championships	Junior	2; 51.33	1; 95.48	1; 146.81
