= 2019 South Korean Figure Skating Championships =

Figure skating competition

- Type: National Championship
- Date: January 11 – 13
- Season: 2018–19
- Location: Seoul
- Venue: Mokdong Ice Rink

Champions
- Men's singles: Cha Jun-hwan
- Ladies' singles: You Young
- Previous: 2018 South Korean Championships
- Next: 2020 South Korean Championships

The 2019 South Korean Figure Skating Championships were held from January 11–13, 2019 at the Mokdong Ice Rink in Seoul. It was organized by the Korean Skating Union. This was the 73rd edition of these championships held.

Skaters competed in the disciplines of men's singles and ladies' singles on the senior and junior levels and ice dancing on the junior level for the title of national champion of South Korea. The results of the national championships were used to choose the Korean teams to the 2019 World Junior Championships and 2019 World Championships.

== Senior results ==
Cha Jun-hwan and You Young both won their third senior national titles.

=== Senior men ===
| Rank | Name | Total points | SP | | FS | |
|---|---|---|---|---|---|---|
| 1 | Cha Jun-hwan | 245.52 | 1 | 89.12 | 1 | 156.40 |
| 2 | Lee June-hyoung | 194.33 | 3 | 64.41 | 2 | 129.92 |
| 3 | Lee Si-hyeong | 190.92 | 4 | 62.19 | 3 | 128.73 |
| 4 | Cha Young-hyun | 183.37 | 2 | 67.42 | 5 | 115.95 |
| 5 | Kyeong Jae-seok | 176.35 | 5 | 60.32 | 4 | 116.03 |
| 6 | An Geon-hyeong | 174.34 | 6 | 60.25 | 6 | 114.09 |
| 7 | Byun Se-jong | 164.38 | 7 | 58.54 | 8 | 105.84 |
| 8 | Park Sung-hoon | 162.66 | 8 | 55.63 | 7 | 107.03 |

=== Senior ladies ===
| Rank | Name | Total points | SP | | FS | |
|---|---|---|---|---|---|---|
| 1 | You Young | 198.63 | 1 | 67.68 | 1 | 130.95 |
| 2 | Lim Eun-soo | 194.20 | 2 | 67.14 | 2 | 127.06 |
| 3 | Lee Hae-in | 187.73 | 3 | 63.66 | 3 | 124.07 |
| 4 | Park So-youn | 176.74 | 5 | 62.07 | 5 | 114.67 |
| 5 | Kim Ye-lim | 172.90 | 4 | 63.60 | 6 | 109.30 |
| 6 | Wi Seo-yeong | 171.62 | 9 | 56.15 | 4 | 115.47 |
| 7 | Ji Seo-yeon | 168.04 | 7 | 59.06 | 7 | 108.98 |
| 8 | To Ji-hun | 162.60 | 6 | 60.12 | 11 | 102.48 |
| 9 | Kim Ha-nul | 161.16 | 8 | 56.60 | 10 | 104.56 |
| 10 | Choi Yu-jin | 157.07 | 10 | 52.07 | 9 | 105.00 |
| 11 | Jeon Su-been | 156.87 | 11 | 51.42 | 8 | 105.45 |
| 12 | Kim Bo-young | 142.43 | 14 | 48.23 | 12 | 94.20 |
| 13 | Lee Si-won | 140.00 | 13 | 48.29 | 14 | 91.71 |
| 14 | Kim Min-seung | 138.60 | 16 | 46.39 | 13 | 93.21 |
| 15 | Choi Hyun-soo | 135.03 | 15 | 46.25 | 16 | 88.78 |
| 16 | Lee Hyun-soo | 134.23 | 12 | 51.12 | 19 | 83.11 |
| 17 | Jeon Gyo-hee | 133.10 | 20 | 43.47 | 15 | 89.63 |
| 18 | Lee Eun-seo | 130.25 | 17 | 45.22 | 17 | 85.03 |
| 19 | Kim Do-eun | 127.86 | 21 | 43.14 | 18 | 84.72 |
| 20 | Seo Ye-eun | 119.33 | 18 | 45.11 | 21 | 74.22 |
| 21 | Noh Chae-eun | 116.76 | 23 | 38.19 | 20 | 78.57 |
| 22 | Park Mi-seon | 114.78 | 19 | 43.90 | 22 | 70.88 |
| 23 | An So-hyun | 109.94 | 22 | 42.04 | 23 | 67.90 |
| 24 | Jung You-jin | 100.90 | 24 | 38.10 | 24 | 62.80 |
Did not advance to free skating
| 25 | Lee Yu-rim | 37.71 | 25 | 37.71 | —N/a | |
| 26 | Kang Soo-min | 35.40 | 26 | 35.40 | —N/a | |
| 27 | Park Go-eun | 34.58 | 27 | 34.58 | —N/a | |
| 28 | Youn Ha-rim | 29.75 | 28 | 29.75 | —N/a | |

== International team selections ==
=== Four Continents Championships ===
The 2019 Four Continents Figure Skating Championships were held in Anaheim, California, United States from February 7–10, 2019.

| | Men | Ladies |
|---|---|---|
| 1 | Cha Jun-hwan | Lim Eun-soo |
| 2 | Lee June-hyoung | Kim Ye-lim |
| 3 | Lee Si-hyeong | Kim Ha-nul |
| 1st alt. | An Geon-hyeong | Park So-youn |
| 2nd alt. | Kyeong Jae-seok | Choi Yu-jin |

=== World Junior Championships ===
The 2019 World Junior Figure Skating Championships were held in Zagreb, Croatia from March 4–10, 2019.

| | Men | Ladies |
|---|---|---|
| 1 | Lee Si-hyeong | You Young |
| 2 | Cha Young-hyun | Lee Hae-in |
| 1st alt. | Kyeong Jae-seok | Kim Ye-lim |
| 2nd alt. | An Geon-hyeong | Wi Seo-yeong |

=== World Championships ===
The 2019 World Figure Skating Championships were held in Saitama, Japan, from March 18–24, 2019.

| | Men | Ladies |
|---|---|---|
| 1 | Cha Jun-hwan | Lim Eun-soo |
| 1st alt. | Lee June-hyoung | Park So-youn |
| 2nd alt. | —N/a | Kim Ye-lim |
