= Sunghoon (singer, born 2002) =

South Korean singer (born 2002)

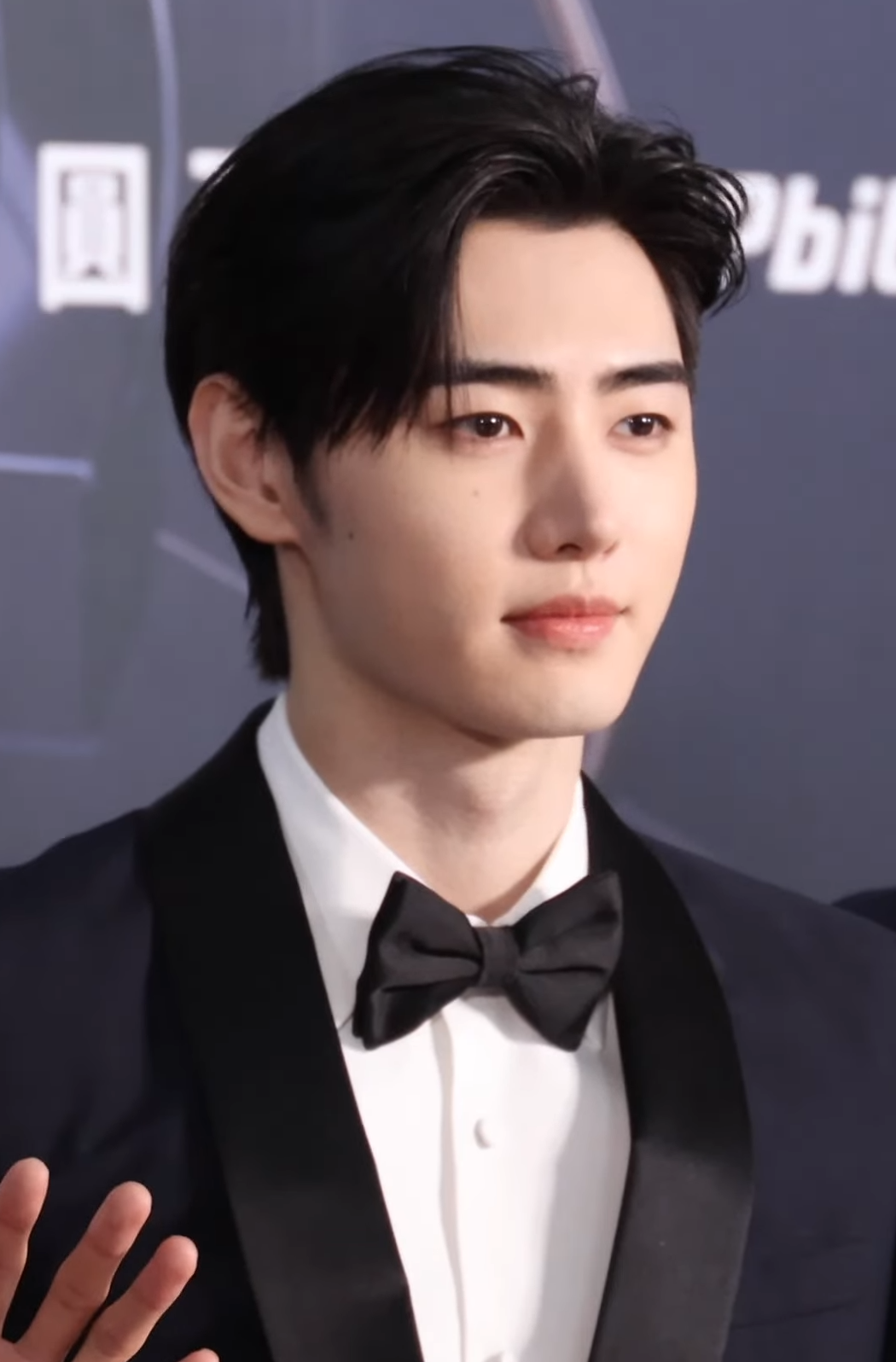
- Sunghoon in January 2026
- Born: Park Sung-hoon; December 8, 2002 (age 23); Cheonan, South Korea
- Occupations: Singer; figure skater
- Years active: 2010–present
- Musical career
- Genre: K-pop
- Instrument: Vocals
- Years active: 2020–present
- Label: Belift Lab
- Member of: Enhypen
- Website: beliftlab.com/enhypen
- Figure skating career
- Country: South Korea
- Began skating: 2010
- Retired: 2020

Korean name
- Hangul: 박성훈
- Hanja: 朴成訓
- RR: Bak Seonghun
- MR: Pak Sŏnghun

Signature
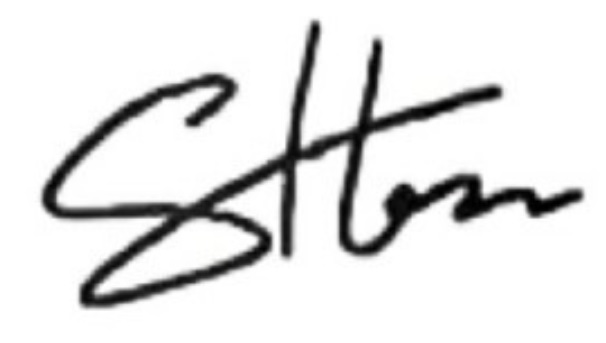

Park Sung-hoon (Korean: 박성훈; born December 8, 2002), known mononymously as Sunghoon, is a South Korean singer and former figure skater. He competed as a figure skater from 2010 to early 2020; while simultaneously being a K-pop trainee since 2018. He retired from the sport and debuted as a member of the South Korean boy band Enhypen from the survival show I-Land in November 2020. Sunghoon is the 2016–2017 junior silver medalist and the 2015 novice gold medalist of Asian Figure Skating Trophy, and the 2015 novice gold medalist of Lombardia Trophy. He also won silver medals at the 2013 novice competition and the 2014 junior competition of South Korean Figure Skating Championships.

== Career ==
=== 2010–2020: Figure skating ===
Sunghoon won two international advanced novice competitions, Asian Figure Skating Trophy and Lombardia Trophy, during the 2015-16 figure skating season.

Sunghoon made his international junior debut during the 2016-17 figure skating season when he became age-eligible. He earned a silver medal at Asian Figure Skating Trophy, and participated in ISU Junior Grand Prix in Estonia as a representative of South Korea. The next year, he won another silver medal at Asian Figure Skating Trophy, and participated in ISU Junior Grand Prix in Poland.

During the 2018-19 figure skating season, Sunghoon became age-eligible for senior competitions. He participated in two ISU Challenger Series events, Asian Figure Skating Trophy and Alpen Trophy.

=== 2020–present: Debut with Enhypen and hosting ===
In 2018, Sunghoon became a trainee at Big Hit Music after being scouted while figure skating. On June 1, 2020, he was announced as a participant in the survival show I-Land, a competition survival show produced by Mnet and Belift Lab, a joint venture between CJ E&M and Hybe Corporation. As one of seven successful finalists, he placed sixth and was selected to join the newly formed South Korean idol group Enhypen. Sunghoon made his official debut with the group on November 30, 2020, with the extended play (EP) Border: Day One.

In September 2021, Sunghoon was announced as the new host for Korean television program Music Bank with Wonyoung of Ive. The pair, dubbed as "장꾸" (Jangkku), first appeared on air together on October 8, 2021.

On July 27, 2022, Sunghoon made a special appearance in Playlist's web series Mimicus as himself.

== Other ventures ==
=== Endorsements ===
On April 30, 2024, with the reveal of a digital pictorial for W Korea's May issue showcasing Tiffany & Co. jewellery, Sunghoon and bandmate Jake were announced as regional South Korea and Japan 'friends of the house' ambassadors for the luxury brand. On May 31, Sunghoon was announced as the exclusive model for South Korean cosmetics brand Hince. On September 30, hair care brand L'Oreal Paris named Sunghoon as its latest ambassador. As an Enhypen member, he also became a Prada ambassador.

On October 24, 2025, MUSINSA appointed Sunghoon as its ambassador in China.

== Programs ==
Season	Short program	Free skating
2019–2020	You Are the Reason by Calum Scott choreo. by Scott Brown	Sarabande Suite (Aeternae) by Globus choreo. by Shin Yea-Ji
2018–2019	Your Song from Moulin Rouge! choreo. by Drew Meekins	The Phantom of the Opera by Andrew Lloyd Webber choreo. by Akiko Suzuki
2017–2018	Your Song from Moulin Rouge! choreo. by Drew Meekins	Piano Concerto No. 2 by Sergei Rachmaninoff choreo. by Drew Meekins
2016–2017	Penser l'impossible from Mozart, l'opéra rock choreo. by Shin Yea-Ji	Una furtiva lagrima from L'elisir d'amore; Caruso performed by Luciano Pavarotti choreo. by Shin Yea-Ji
2015–2016	Viejos Aires by Ensamble Nuevo Tango choreo. by Kenji Miyamoto	The Mask of Zorro by James Horner choreo. by Tetsukasu Nakashima
2014–2015	Viejos Aires by Ensamble Nuevo Tango choreo. by Kenji Miyamoto	Billy Elliot (Final, Angry Dance, Electricity) by Elton John choreo. by Shin Yea-Ji
2013–2014	Io ci sarò performed by Andrea Bocelli; Piano Concerto No. 3 by Sergei Rachmaninoff choreo. by Shin Yea-Ji	Billy Elliot (Final, Angry Dance, Electricity) by Elton John choreo. by Shin Yea-Ji
2012–2013	Io ci sarò performed by Andrea Bocelli; Piano Concerto No. 3 by Sergei Rachmaninoff choreo. by Shin Yea-Ji	Red Cliff composed by Taro Iwashiro choreo. by Shin Yea-Ji
2011–2012		Red Cliff composed by Taro Iwashiro choreo. by Shin Yea-Ji
2010–2011		Superman composed by John Williams choreo. by Park Bit-Na

== Competitive highlights ==
CS: Challenger Series; JGP: ISU Junior Grand Prix

Results
International
Event	13–14	14–15	15–16	16–17	17–18	18–19	19–20
CS Alpen Trophy						21st	
CS Asian Open						7th	
International: Junior, novice
JGP Estonia				15th			
JGP Poland					16th		
Asian Trophy	3rd N.		1st N.	2nd J.	2nd J.		
National
South Korean	2nd J.	8th	7th	7th	8th	8th	7th

== Detailed results ==
2019–2020 season
Date	Event	Level	SP	FS	Total
January 3–5, 2020	2020 South Korean Championships	Senior	7; 55.64	8; **111.48**	7; **167.12**
2018–2019 season
Date	Event	Level	SP	FS	Total
January 11–13, 2019	2019 South Korean Championships	Senior	8; 55.63	7; 107.03	8; 162.66
November 14–17, 2018	2018 CS Alpen Trophy	Senior	26; 42.54	21; 91.87	21; 134.41
August 1–5, 2018	2018 CS Asian Open Trophy	Senior	5; **58.62**	8; 105.14	7; 163.76
2017–2018 season
Date	Event	Level	SP	FS	Total
January 5–7, 2018	2018 South Korean Championships	Senior	8; 58.12	8; 108.87	8; 166.99
October 4–7, 2017	2017 JGP Poland	Junior	17; 50.34	15; 105.68	16; 156.02
August 2–5, 2017	2017 Asian Open Trophy	Junior	2; 56.51	2; 107.48	2; 163.99
2016–2017 season
January 7–9, 2017	2017 South Korean Championships	Senior	8; 49.08	7; 112.21	7; 161.29
September 28–October 1, 2016	2016 JGP Estonia	Junior	14; 53.47	17; 92.54	15; 146.01
August 4–6, 2016	2016 Asian Open Trophy	Junior	2; 60.43	2; 119.40	2; 179.83
2015–2016 season
Date	Event	Level	SP	FS	Total
January 8–10, 2016	2016 South Korean Championships	Senior	6; 45.45	7; 101.63	7; 147.08
2014–2015 season
Date	Event	Level	SP	FS	Total
January 2–4, 2015	2015 South Korean Championships	Senior	8; 40.25	8; 91.53	8; 131.78
2013–2014 season
Date	Event	Level	SP	FS	Total
January 3–5, 2014	2014 South Korean Championships	Junior	2; 39.74	2; 87.54	2; 127.28

- Personal best highlighted in **bold**.

== Filmography ==
=== Web series ===
Web series appearances
Year	Title	Role	Notes	Ref.
2022	Mimicus	Himself	Cameo	

=== Television shows ===
Year	Title	Role	Notes	Ref.
2014	Crayon in My Mind	Himself	Episode 426	
2020	I-Land	Contestant	Finished in sixth place	
2022	Giant Peng TV	Himself	with Sunoo, Jungwon, and Ni-Ki	

=== Hosting ===
Year	Title	Role	Notes	Ref.
2021–2022	Music Bank	MC	with Jang Won-young	
2021	2021 KBS Song Festival	Backstage MC	with Arin, Jang Won-young and Soobin	
2023	Stars' Top Recipe at Fun-Staurant	Special MC	with Boom, Hanhae and Sandara Park	

=== Web shows ===
Year	Title	Role	Notes	Ref.
2021	King Sunghoon Review Park			
2022	Idol’s Snack Spree	Himself	with Wonyoung, Ep.1	

== Awards and nominations ==
Name of the award ceremony, year presented, category, nominee of the award, and the result of the nomination
Award ceremony	Year	Category	Nominee / Work	Result	Ref.
KBS Entertainment Awards	2021	Best Couple Award (with Jang Won-young)	Music Bank	Won	
KBS Entertainment Awards	2021	Rookie Award in Show/Variety Category	Music Bank	Nominated	
Seoul International Drama Awards	2023	Idol Champ Artist Award	Mimicus	Won	
