= Cha Young-hyun =

South Korean figure skater (born 2003)

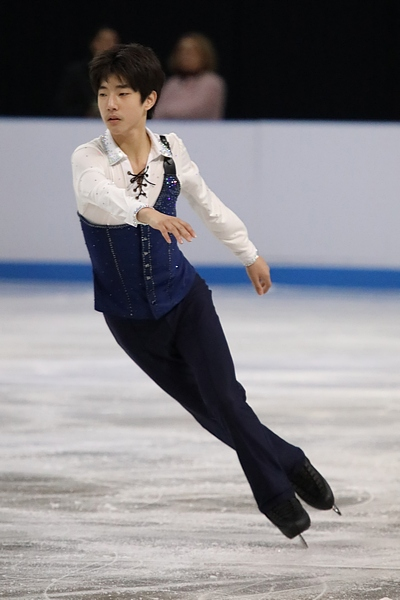
- Cha Young-hyun at the 2018 World Junior Championships

Personal information
- Native name: 차영현
- Born: September 24, 2003 (age 23) Seoul, South Korea
- Home town: Paju City, South Korea
- Height: 1.73 m (5 ft 8 in)

Figure skating career
- Country: South Korea
- Discipline: Men's singles
- Coach: Choi Hyung-kyung; Kim Na-hyun; Kim Min-seok
- Began skating: 2008

Medal record
South Korean Championships
Bronze medal – third place	2021 Uijeongbu	Singles

- Cha Young-hyun
- Hangul: 차영현
- RR: Cha Yeonghyeon
- MR: Ch'a Yŏnghyŏn

Cha Young-hyun (Korean: 차영현; born September 24, 2003) is a South Korean figure skater and a tightrope dancer (eoreum-sani) of Namsadang. He is the 2017 South Korean national junior champion and the 2021 South Korean national bronze medalist.

== Personal life ==
Cha was born on September 24, 2003, in Paju, Gyeonggi Province, South Korea. He is currently a student at Korea University.

== Career ==
=== Early career ===
Cha started skating in 2007. He performed traditional Korean tightrope dancing in 2011 and holds the record as the youngest tightrope dancer (eoreum-sani) of Namsadang at eight years old.

=== 2017–2018 season ===
Cha made his international debut at the ISU Junior Grand Prix circuit in Italy, where he finished in sixteenth place. Following a fifth-place finish at the 2018 South Korean Figure Skating Championships, Cha was selected to compete at the 2018 World Junior Figure Skating Championships, where he placed nineteenth.

Following the season, Cha made a coaching change from Lee Eun-hee to Hong Ye-Seul.

=== 2018–2019 season ===
Cha began his season with eighth and seventh place finishes at 2018 JGP Austria and 2018 JGP Slovenia, respectively. Cha was once again selected to compete at the World Junior Championships after placing fourth at the 2019 South Korean Figure Skating Championships. He ultimately finished in twentieth at the Junior Worlds.

=== 2019–2020 season ===
Cha started his season by finishing fifth at 2019 JGP Russia and eleventh at 2019 JGP Italy. He then went on to make his senior international debut at the 2019 CS Asian Open Figure Skating Trophy, where he placed seventh. Following Cha's second consecutive fourth-place finish at the 2020 South Korean Figure Skating Championships, he was selected to represent South Korea at the 2020 Winter Youth Olympics. Cha managed to finish fifth at that event after placing fifth both in both short and free program segments of the competition.

=== 2020–2021 season ===
Cha only competed at the 2021 South Korean Figure Skating Championships during this season, where he won the bronze medal.

He switched coaches from Hong Ye-Seul to Choi Hyung-kyung following the season.

=== 2021–2022 season ===
Cha started season by respectively finishing seventh and fourth at 2021 JGP Slovakia and 2021 JGP Slovenia. After finishing fourth at the 2022 South Korean Figure Skating Championships, Cha concluded his season by finishing nineteenth at the 2022 World Junior Championships.

=== 2022–2023 season ===
Cha began the season with a silver medal at 2022 JGP France. He then went on to compete on the senior level at 2022 CS Nebelhorn Trophy, where he placed tenth. At the 2022 JGP Poland I, Cha's second Junior Grand Prix assignment, he finished fourth. One month later, Cha competed at the 2022 CS Ice Challenge, where he placed tenth. He would then place sixth at the 2023 South Korean Championships.

Due Cha having previously finished second at the 2022 Korean Universiade, he was selected to represent South Korea at the 2023 Winter World University Games in January, where he would finish seventh.

=== 2023–2024 season ===
Cha started the season by winning the silver medal at the 2023 Asian Open Trophy before coming in seventh at the 2023 CS Finlandia Trophy. In January, he finished sixth at the 2024 South Korean Championships.

Selected to compete at the 2024 Four Continents in Shanghai, China, Cha finished fourteenth.

=== 2024–2025 season ===
Cha began the season in October by competing at the 2024 Korean Universiade and Asian Games Qualifiers, where he finished fourth. With this result, Cha was selected to represent South Korea at the 2025 Winter World University Games. He then went on to finish seventh at the annual Korean Ranking Competition and at the 2025 South Korean Championships.

In mid-January, he placed twelfth at the 2025 Winter World University Games in Turin, Italy.

=== 2025–2026 season ===
Cha opened his season by competing on the 2025–26 Challenger Series, finishing ninth at the 2025 CS Nepela Memorial and eighth at the 2025 CS Denis Ten Memorial Challenge.

In January, he finished seventh at the 2026 South Korean Championships. Cha was called up to compete at the 2026 World Championships in late March following the withdrawal of Cha Jun-hwan. There, he placed twenty-seventh in the short program and did not advance to the free skate.

=== 2026–2027 season ===
Cha opened the new season with an eleventh place finish at the 2026 CS Nepela Memorial.

== Programs ==
Season	Short program	Free skating	Exhibition
2025–2026	Reel Around The Sun (from Riverdance) by Bill Whelan choreo. by Shin Yea-ji	Piano Concerto No. 1 in B-Flat Minor, Op. 23: I. Allegro non troppo e molto Maestoso, Allegro con Spirito; by P. I. Tchaikovsky	
2024–2025	Reel Around The Sun (from Riverdance) by Bill Whelan choreo. by Shin Yea-ji	Dune; Herald of the Change; Armada; Premonition by Hans Zimmer choreo. by Shin Yea-ji	
2023–2024	The Devil arranged by Kim Youngah performed by Seoul Classical Players choreo. by Shin Yea-ji; Erlkönig, D.328 by Franz Schubert arranged by Kim Youngah performed by Seoul Classical Players choreo. by Shin Yea-ji	Dune; Herald of the Change; Armada; Premonition by Hans Zimmer choreo. by Shin Yea-ji	
2022–2023	The Devil arranged by Kim Youngah performed by Seoul Classical Players choreo. by Shin Yea-ji	Dune; Herald of the Change; Armada; Premonition by Hans Zimmer choreo. by Shin Yea-ji	Wandering (방황) composed by Kyung Sub Lee
2021–2022	The Godfather Suite by Nino Rota performed by Drew Tretick choreo. by Shin Yea-ji	The Phantom of the Opera by Andrew Lloyd Webber performed by Parague Cello Quartet choreo. by Shin Yea-ji	
2020–2021	The Godfather Suite by Nino Rota performed by Drew Tretick choreo. by Shin Yea-ji	The Phantom of the Opera by Andrew Lloyd Webber performed by Parague Cello Quartet choreo. by Shin Yea-ji	
2019–2020	Boléro (Je Me Souviens De Nous) composed by Maxime Rodriguez choreo. by Nikita Mikhailov	Minnie The Moocher (The Blues Brothers soundtrack) choreo. by Karen Kwan	
2018–2019	The Grand Budapest Hotel soundtrack Billy Elliot the Musical soundtrack choreo. by Nikita Mikhailov	D'Artagnan composed by Maxime Rodriguez choreo. by Nikita Mikhailov	Wandering (방황) composed by Kyung Sub Lee
2017–2018	Boléro (Je Me Souviens De Nous) composed by Maxime Rodriguez choreo. by Nikita Mikhailov	D'Artagnan composed by Maxime Rodriguez choreo. by Nikita Mikhailov	
2016–2017	Don't Stop Me Now by Queen	Casablanca by Max Steiner	
2015–2016	Don't Stop Me Now by Queen	Wandering (방황) composed by Kyung Sub Lee	
2014–2015	Kung Fu Panda by Hans Zimmer and John Powell	Modern Times by Charlie Chaplin	
2013–2014	Kung Fu Panda by Hans Zimmer and John Powell	Ninja Assassin composed by Andy Brown; Modern Times by Charlie Chaplin	
2012–2013		Arirang (아리랑) composed by Elec Cookie	
2011–2012		Arirang (아리랑) composed by Elec Cookie	

== Competitive highlights ==
- JGP – Event of the ISU Junior Grand Prix Series
- CS – Event of the ISU Challenger Series

Competition placements at senior level
Season	2017–18	2018–19	2019–20	2020–21	2021–22	2022–23	2023–24	2024–25	2025–26	2026–27
World Championships									27th	
Four Continents Championships							14th			
South Korean Championships	5th	4th	4th	3rd	4th	6th	6th	7th	7th	
CS Asian Open Trophy			7th							
CS Denis Ten Memorial									8th	
CS Ice Challenge						10th				
CS Finlandia Trophy							7th			
CS Nebelhorn Trophy						10th				
CS Nepela Memorial									9th	11th
CS Trophée Métropole								14th		
Asian Open Trophy							2nd			
Winter World University Games						7th		12th		

Competition placements at junior level
Season	2016–17	2017–18	2018–19	2019–20	2021–22	2022–23
Winter Youth Olympics				5th		
Winter Youth Olympics (Team event)				4th		
World Junior Championships		19th	20th		19th	
South Korean Championships	1st					
JGP Austria			8th			
JGP France						2nd
JGP Italy		16th		11th		
JGP Poland						4th
JGP Russia				5th		
JGP Slovakia					7th	
JGP Slovenia			7th		4th	
Children of Asian			3rd			

== Detailed results ==
ISU personal best scores in the +5/-5 GOE System
Segment	Type	Score	Event
Total	TSS	218.48	2025 CS Denis Ten Memorial Challenge
Short program	TSS	76.37	2025 CS Denis Ten Memorial Challenge
Short program	TES	39.97	2025 CS Denis Ten Memorial Challenge
Short program	PCS	36.40	2025 CS Denis Ten Memorial Challenge
Free skating	TSS	142.38	2023 CS Finlandia Trophy
Free skating	TES	72.12	2025 CS Nepela Memorial
Free skating	PCS	73.92	2025 CS Denis Ten Memorial Challenge

=== Senior level ===
Results in the 2026–27 season
Date	Event	SP		FS		Total	
Date	Event	P	Score	P	Score	P	Score
September 24–27, 2026	(Slovakia) 2026 Nepela Memorial	15	62.35	9	139.00	11	201.35

Results in the 2025–26 season
Date	Event	SP		FS		Total	
Date	Event	P	Score	P	Score	P	Score
Sep 25–27, 2025	(Slovakia) 2025 CS Nepela Memorial	11	71.73	7	141.09	8	212.82
Jan 16–18, 2025	(Kazakhstan) 2025 CS Denis Ten Memorial Challenge	9	76.37	8	142.11	8	218.48
Jan 3–6, 2026	(South Korea) 2026 South Korean Championships	7	64.74	7	144.74	7	209.48
Mar 24–29, 2026	(Czech Republic) 2026 World Championships	27	70.92	—N/a	—N/a	27	70.92

Results in the 2024–25 season
Date	Event	SP		FS		Total	
Date	Event	P	Score	P	Score	P	Score
Oct 16–20, 2024	(France) 2024 CS Trophée Métropole Nice Côte d'Azur	15	64.71	16	120.27	14	184.98
Jan 2–5, 2025	(South Korea) 2025 South Korean Championships	7	68.79	7	142.30	7	211.09
Jan 16–18, 2025	(Italy) 2025 Winter World University Games	11	69.24	11	132.10	12	201.34

2023–2024 season
Date	Event	SP	FS	Total
January 30–February 4, 2024	2024 Four Continents Championships	12; 72.43	16; 131.71	14; 204.14
January 4–7, 2024	2024 South Korean Championships	7; 71.38	7; 146.10	6; 217.48
October 4–8, 2023	2023 CS Finlandia Trophy	9; 68.77	6; 142.38	7; 211.15
August 16–19, 2023	2023 Asian Open Trophy	2; 64.84	1; 127.53	2; 192.37

=== Junior level ===
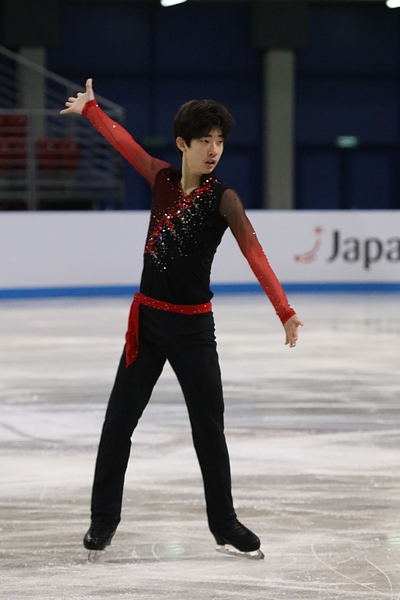
Cha at the 2018 World Junior Championships

2022–2023 season
Date	Event	Level	SP	FS	Total
January 13–15, 2022	2023 Winter Universiade	Senior	10; 67.13	7; 140.90	7; 208.03
November 9–13, 2022	2022 CS Ice Challenge	Senior	14; 59.27	6; 136.74	10; 196.01
September 28–October 1, 2022	2022 JGP Poland I	Junior	7; 65.72	3; 133.46	4; 199.18
September 21–24, 2022	2022 CS Nebelhorn Trophy	Senior	14; 53.94	6; 129.15	10; 183.09
August 24–27, 2022	2022 JGP France	Junior	2; 70.25	2; 125.90	2; 196.15
2021–2022 season
Date	Event	Level	SP	FS	Total
April 13–17, 2022	2022 World Junior Championships	Junior	19; 60.32	18; 115.31	19; 175.63
January 7–9, 2022	2022 South Korean Championships	Senior	3; 69.47	4; 138.98	4; 208.45
September 22–25, 2021	2021 JGP Slovenia	Junior	2; 67.33	6; 124.00	4; 191.33
September 1–4, 2021	2021 JGP Slovakia	Junior	9; 58.84	5; 123.45	7; 182.29
2020–2021 season
Date	Event	Level	SP	FS	Total
February 24–26, 2021	2021 South Korean Championships	Senior	5; 61.90	3; 131.54	3; 193.44
2019–2020 season
Date	Event	Level	SP	FS	Total
January 10–15, 2020	2020 Winter Youth Olympics – Team	Junior	–	3; 133.13	4T/3P
January 10–15, 2020	2020 Winter Youth Olympics	Junior	5; 69.61	5; 129.51	5; 199.12
October 30–November 3, 2019	2019 CS Asian Open Trophy	Senior	7; 64.64	7; 116.31	7; 180.95
September 11–14, 2019	2019 JGP Russia	Junior	8; 61.05	4; 122.56	5; 183.61
October 2–5, 2019	2019 JGP Italy	Junior	12; 60.85	9; 125.16	11; 186.01
2018–2019 season
Date	Event	Level	SP	FS	Total
March 4–10, 2019	2019 World Junior Championships	Junior	21; 61.75	19; 115.47	20; 177.22
February 13–15, 2019	2019 Children of Asia ISG	Junior	4; 64.39	3; 128.99	3; 193.38
January 11–13, 2019	2019 South Korean Championships	Senior	2; 67.42	5; 115.95	4; 183.37
October 3–6, 2018	2018 JGP Slovenia	Junior	8; 62.39	7; 121.60	7; 183.99
Aug. 29 – Sept. 1, 2018	2018 JGP Austria	Junior	11; 56.08	7; 117.74	8; 173.82
2017–2018 season
Date	Event	Level	SP	FS	Total
March 5–11, 2018	2018 World Junior Championships	Junior	23; 57.57	16; 116.56	19; 174.13
January 5–7, 2018	2018 South Korean Championships	Senior	7; 61.23	5; 134.19	5; 195.42
October 11–14, 2017	2017 JGP Italy	Junior	15; 50.35	15; 101.01	16; 151.36
2016–2017 season
Date	Event	Level	SP	FS	Total
January 7–9, 2017	2017 South Korean Championships	Junior	1; 49.95	1; 112.91	1; 162.86
