= Wi Seo-yeong =

South Korean retired figure skater (born 2005)

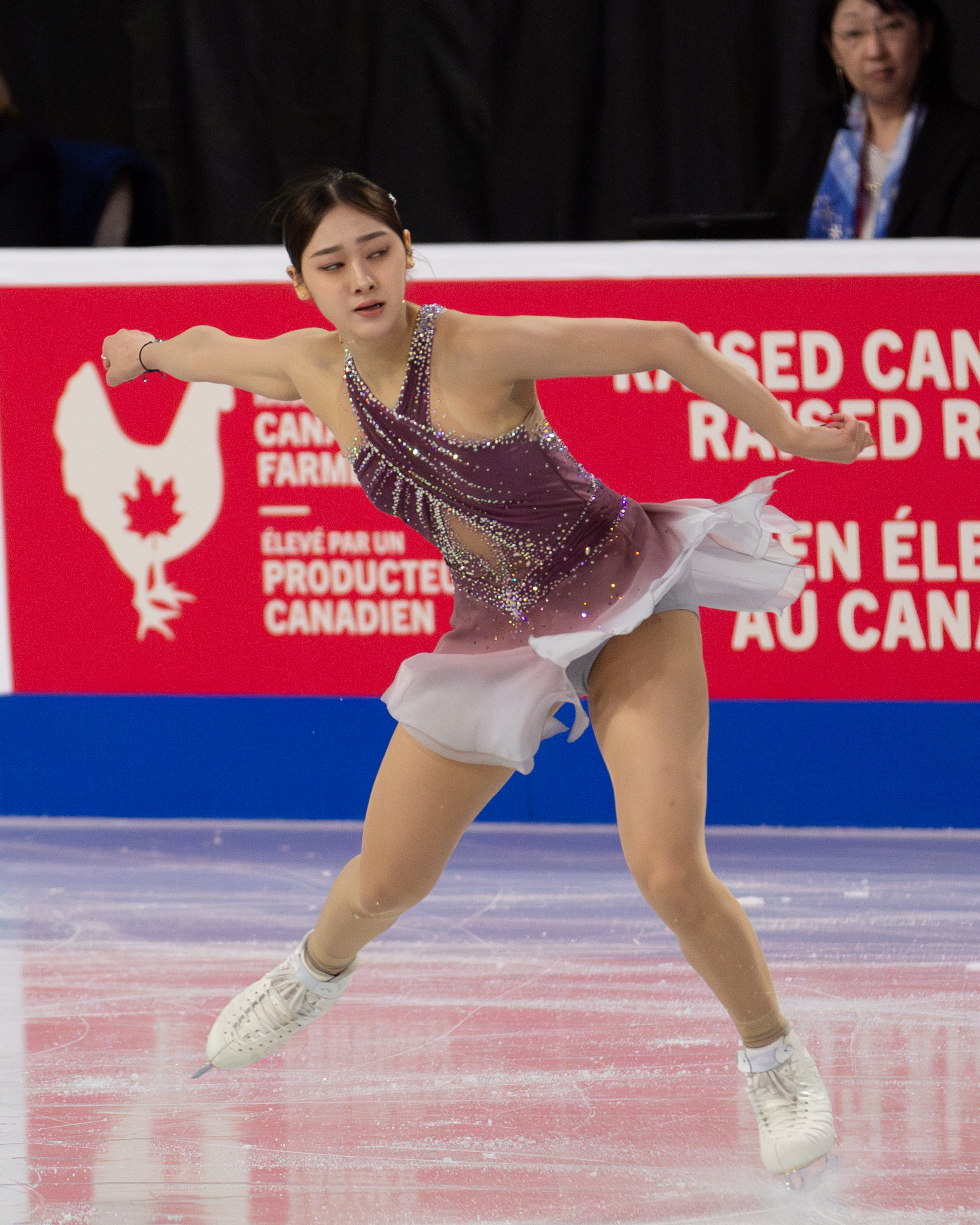
- Wi Seo-yeong at the 2024 Skate Canada International

Personal information
- Native name: 위서영
- Other names: Wee Seo-young
- Born: March 15, 2005 (age 21) Seoul, South Korea
- Home town: Hwaseong City, South Korea
- Height: 1.66 m (5 ft 5 1/2 in)

Figure skating career
- Country: South Korea
- Discipline: Women's singles
- Coach: Choi Hyung-kyung; Kim Na-hyun
- Began skating: 2010
- Retired: February 4, 2025

Wi Seo-yeong (Korean: 위서영; born March 15, 2005) is a South Korean retired figure skater. She is the 2022 CS Nebelhorn Trophy silver medalist.

On the junior level, she is the 2019 JGP France silver medalist and the 2018 South Korean junior national champion. She placed in the top six at two World Junior Championships (2020, 2022).

== Personal life ==
Wi Seo-yeong was born on March 15, 2005, in Seoul, South Korea.

She is currently a student at Korea University.

== Career ==
=== Early career ===
Wi began figure skating in 2010 at the age of six. She moved to Gwacheon at the age of twelve to train under Choi Hyung-kyung. She is considered part of the second generation of "Yuna Kids," South Korean ladies who began skating after being inspired by 2010 Olympic Champion Yuna Kim.

Wi won the gold medal at the 2018 South Korean Junior Championships.

=== 2018–2019 season ===
Wi made her junior international debut at the 2018 Asian Open Trophy in August, where she won the bronze medal behind teammate Lee Hae-in and American Gabriella Izzo. She then received her first Junior Grand Prix assignments, placing fourth at both 2018 JGP Czech Republic and 2018 JGP Armenia. Competing as a senior domestically for the first time, Wi placed sixth at the 2019 South Korean Championships and was not selected for the 2019 World Junior Championships team.

=== 2019–2020 season ===
Wi opened the season by winning her first Junior Grand Prix medal, silver, at 2019 JGP France behind Kamila Valieva and ahead of Maiia Khromykh, both of Russia. Although Wi had to wear tape around her skates since her boots had collapsed before the competition, she managed to become the fifth Korean lady to score above 190 points internationally at the event. Wi's medal set off a series of consecutive medal wins by Korean ladies on the 2019–20 Junior Grand Prix.

At her second event, 2019 JGP Poland, she finished fourth behind Alysa Liu, Viktoria Vasilieva, and Anastasia Tarakanova. She then competed at the 2019 Asian Open Trophy in November, winning gold by over 30 points ahead of teammate Ji Seo-yeon and Hong Kong's Hiu Yau Chow.

Wi finished fourth in the senior division at the 2020 South Korean Championships, behind You Young, Lee Hae-in, and Kim Ye-lim. As a result, she was named to the 2020 World Junior Championships team alongside Lee. At the 2020 World Junior Championships, Wi placed sixth in the short program after her flying sit spin was invalidated. She said: "It's my first Junior Worlds, so I was very nervous today. I did no big mistakes, so I'm very satisfied." Wi improved to fifth in the free skate to finish sixth overall. Her placement, combined with Lee's, earned South Korea three spots for the next season.

=== 2020–2021 season ===
With the COVID-19 pandemic greatly curtailing competitive opportunities for South Korean skaters, Wi competed first at the 2021 South Korean Championships, finishing fifth.

=== 2021–2022 season ===
With the resumption of the regular international season, Wi was assigned to make her Grand Prix debut at the 2021 NHK Trophy, where she finished in ninth place.

Due to her national result, Wi was named to South Korea's team for the 2022 World Junior Championships, but events would soon complicate the situation. Shortly after the conclusion of the 2022 Winter Olympics, Russia invaded Ukraine. As a result, the International Skating Union banned all Russian athletes from competing at ISU championships. As Russian women had dominated international figure skating in recent years, this had a significant impact on the field. Due to both the invasion and the Omicron variant, the World Junior Championships could not be held as scheduled in Sofia in early March and were rescheduled for mid-April in Tallinn. Wi placed fifth in the short program. She was sixth in the free skate after falling on her final double Axel attempt but remained in fifth place overall.

=== 2022–2023 season ===
Wi began the season with her Challenger series debut at the 2022 CS Nebelhorn Trophy. Although she had come down with the flu during the competition, she managed to win the silver medal after placing third in the short program and winning the free skate.

Given one Grand Prix assignment, Wi was assigned to compete at the 2022 NHK Trophy. Prior to the event, Wi contracted COVID-19, but was cleared on time for the competition. She would ultimately finish eighth.

She then closed her season with a ninth-place finish at the 2023 Korean Championships.

=== 2023–2024 season ===
Wi came thirteenth at the 2023 CS Finlandia Trophy, her first competition of the season. On the Grand Prix, she was twelfth of twelve skaters at the 2023 Skate America and tenth at the 2023 NHK Trophy.

At the annual national ranking competition, Wi won the bronze medal and was selected to represent South Korea at the 2024 Four Continents Championships. She went on to compete at the 2024 South Korean Championships, where she finished in twelfth place.

At the Four Continents Championships in Shanghai, Wi came sixth in the short program. She was fifth in the free skate, her only mistake being a slight underrotation on a double toe loop, rising to fifth overall. Wi remarked "I wanted to do my best and I think I did."

=== 2024–2025 season ===
Wi began the season by finishing thirteenth at the 2024 CS Nebelhorn Trophy. She subsequently went on to compete at the 2024 Korean Universiade and Asian Games Qualifiers, where she finished fifth. With this result, Wi was selected to represent South Korea at the 2025 Winter World University Games. Going on to compete on the 2024–25 Grand Prix series, Wi finished eleventh at 2024 Skate Canada International and seventh at the 2024 NHK Trophy.

In late November, Wi competed at the South Korean Ranking Competition, where she finished in seventh place. One month later, she placed tenth at the 2025 South Korean Championships. Going on to compete at the 2025 Winter World University Games, Wi finished in twelfth place. Shortly following the event, Wi announced her retirement from competitive figure skating. A couple weeks later, Wi, alongside fellow retired figure skaters, Lim Eun-soo and Choi Da-bin, were invited to perform together during the Gala at the 2025 Four Continents Championships, which were held in Seoul.

== Programs ==
Season	Short program	Free skating	Exhibition
2024–2025	Viejos Aires by Ara Malikian performed by Fernando Egozcue choreo. by Shin Yea-ji	Tristan & Iseult by Maxime Rodriguez choreo. by Shin Yea-ji	Hallelujah by Leonard Cohen performed by Pentatonix
2023–2024	Dawn (from Pride and Prejudice) by Dario Marianelli choreo. by Shin Yea-ji	Exogenesis: Symphony Part 1: Overture & Part 3: Redemption by Muse choreo. by Jeffrey Buttle	
2022–2023	Dawn (from Pride and Prejudice) by Dario Marianelli choreo. by Shin Yea-ji	Moulin Rouge: Bolero (Closing Credits) by Steve Sharples; Come What May by Ewan McGregor and Nicole Kidman choreo. by Shin Yea-ji	Crouching Tiger, Hidden Dragon; The Banquet by Tan Dun choreo. by Shin Yea-ji
2021–2022	The Grandmaster by Shigeru Umebayashi; The Last Airbender by James Newton Howard choreo. by Shin Yea-ji	Tristan & Iseult by Maxime Rodriguez choreo. by Shin Yea-ji	
2020–2021	Viejos Aires by Ara Malikian performed by Fernando Egozcue choreo. by Shin Yea-ji	Tristan & Iseult by Maxime Rodriguez choreo. by Shin Yea-ji	
2019–2020	Crouching Tiger, Hidden Dragon; The Banquet by Tan Dun choreo. by Shin Yea-ji	Amélie by Yann Tiersen choreo. by Shin Yea-ji	
2018–2019	Out Here on My Own performed by Naturi Naughton choreo. by Shin Yea-ji	Life Must Have Its Mysteries (from Inferno) by Hans Zimmer choreo. by Shin Yea-ji	

== Competitive highlights ==
GP: Grand Prix; CS: Challenger Series; JGP: Junior Grand Prix

International
Event	17–18	18–19	19–20	20–21	21–22	22–23	23–24	24–25
Four Continents							5th	
GP NHK Trophy					9th	8th	10th	7th
GP Skate America							12th	
GP Skate Canada								11th
CS Asian Open					WD			
CS Finlandia Trophy							13th	
CS Nebelhorn Trophy						2nd		13th
Winter University Games								12th
International: Junior
Junior Worlds			6th		5th			
JGP Armenia		4th						
JGP France			2nd					
JGP Czech Rep.		4th						
JGP Poland			4th					
Asian Open		3rd	1st					
National
South Korean	1st J	6th	4th	5th	5th	9th	12th	10th

== Detailed results ==
ISU personal best scores in the +5/-5 GOE System
Segment	Type	Score	Event
Total	TSS	193.57	2024 Four Continents Championships
Short program	TSS	66.48	2018 JGP Czech Republic
Short program	TES	40.17	2018 JGP Czech Republic
Short program	PCS	28.83	2020 World Junior Championships
Free skating	TSS	131.94	2022 CS Nebelhorn Trophy
Free skating	TES	72.53	2022 CS Nebelhorn Trophy
Free skating	PCS	59.41	2022 CS Nebelhorn Trophy

=== Senior level ===
2024–25 season
Date	Event	SP	FS	Total
January 13–23, 2025	2025 Winter World University Games	12; 50.10	11; 97.01	12; 147.11
January 2–5, 2025	2025 South Korean Championships	9; 58.57	10; 109.82	10; 168.39
November 8–10, 2024	2024 NHK Trophy	7; 61.43	9; 112.34	7; 173.77
October 25–27, 2024	2024 Skate Canada International	11; 47.86	11; 92.99	11; 140.85
September 19–21, 2024	2024 CS Nebelhorn Trophy	14; 46.99	12; 98.95	13; 145.13
2023–24 season
Date	Event	SP	FS	Total
February 1–2, 2024	2024 Four Continents Championships	6; 64.44	5; 129.13	5; 193.57
January 4–7, 2024	2024 South Korean Championships	8; 64.82	15; 110.47	12; 175.29
November 24–26, 2023	2023 NHK Trophy	6; 60.63	10; 97.52	10; 158.15
October 20–22, 2023	2023 Skate America	10; 58.55	12; 97.47	12; 156.02
October 6–8, 2023	2023 CS Finlandia Trophy	15; 47.42	11; 98.01	13; 145.43
2022–23 season
Date	Event	SP	FS	Total
January 5–8, 2023	2023 South Korean Championships	6; 66.28	9; 123.32	9; 189.60
November 18–20, 2022	2022 NHK Trophy	7; 61.06	10; 115.68	8; 176.74
September 21–24, 2022	2022 CS Nebelhorn Trophy	3; 61.31	1; 131.94	2; 193.25
2021–22 season
Date	Event	SP	FS	Total
January 7–9, 2022	2022 South Korean Championships	5; 67.45	6; 130.47	5; 197.92
November 12–14, 2021	2021 NHK Trophy	9; 58.23	9; 112.31	9; 170.54
2020–21 season
Date	Event	SP	FS	Total
February 24–26, 2021	2021 South Korean Championships	6; 65.86	3; 126.98	5; 192.84
2019–20 season
Date	Event	SP	FS	Total
January 3–5, 2020	2020 South Korean Championships	6; 63.32	5; 124.22	4; 187.54
2018–19 season
Date	Event	SP	FS	Total
January 11–13, 2019	2019 South Korean Championships	9; 56.15	4; 115.47	6; 171.62

=== Junior level ===
2021–22 season
Date	Event	SP	FS	Total
April 13–17, 2022	2022 World Junior Championships	5; 66.09	6; 120.63	5; 186.72
2019–20 season
Date	Event	SP	FS	Total
March 2–8, 2020	2020 World Junior Championships	6; 65.45	5; 127.85	6; 193.30
Oct. 30 – Nov. 1, 2019	2019 Asian Open Trophy	1; 65.21	1; 129.26	1; 194.47
September 18–21, 2019	2019 JGP Poland	5; 63.81	4; 116.87	4; 180.68
August 21–24, 2019	2019 JGP France	2; 65.75	2; 125.32	2; 191.07
2018–19 season
Date	Event	SP	FS	Total
October 10–13, 2018	2018 JGP Armenia	4; 60.36	4; 107.21	4; 167.57
September 26–29, 2018	2018 JGP Czech Republic	4; 66.48	6; 110.02	4; 176.50
August 1–3, 2018	2018 Asian Open Trophy	4; 53.21	2; 111.09	3; 164.30
