= Lim Eun-soo =

South Korean figure skater (born 2003)

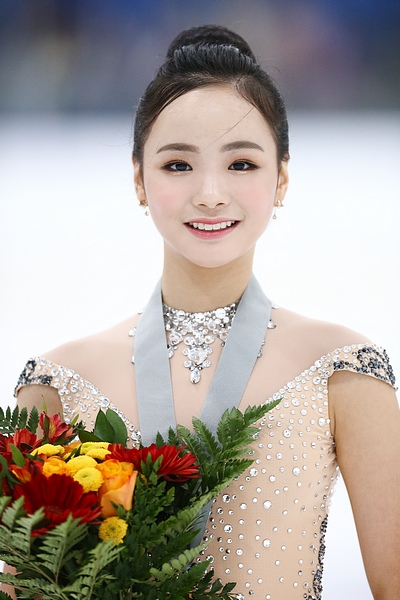
- Lim at the 2019 CS Autumn Classic

Personal information
- Native name: 임은수
- Born: February 26, 2003 (age 23) Seoul, South Korea
- Home town: Gyeonggi Province, South Korea
- Height: 1.64 m (5 ft 4 1/2 in)

Figure skating career
- Country: South Korea
- Began skating: 2009
- Retired: 2023
Medal record
Figure skating: Ladies' singles
South Korean Championships
Gold medal – first place	2017 Gangneung	Ladies' Singles
Silver medal – second place	2019 Seoul	Ladies' Singles
Bronze medal – third place	2016 Seoul	Ladies' Singles
Bronze medal – third place	2018 Seoul	Ladies' Singles

Lim Eun-soo (Korean: 임은수; born February 26, 2003) is a retired South Korean figure skater. She is the 2018 Rostelecom Cup bronze medalist, the two-time CS Asian Open champion (2018, 2019), the 2018 CS U.S. Classic silver medalist, and the 2017 South Korean national champion. She has finished within the top ten at three senior ISU Championships.

Earlier in her career, Lim won two medals on the ISU Junior Grand Prix series (bronze at the 2016 JGP Germany and silver at the 2017 JGP Austria). She has finished within the top five at the World Junior Championships for two consecutive years (2017, 2018).

== Career ==
=== Early years ===
Lim was born on 26 February 2003 in Seoul, South Korea. Lim began skating in 2009. She started training with Chi Hyun-jung as her coach in 2014.

Nationally, Lim started competing at the senior level during the 2014–15 figure skating season. She obtained the bronze medal at the 2016 South Korean Championships, finishing behind You Young and Choi Da-bin.

=== 2016–2017 season: Junior international debut and national title ===
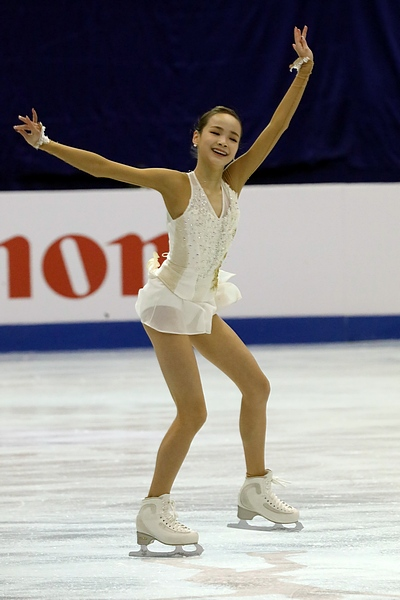
Lim at the 2017 World Junior Championships.

Lim debuted on the Junior Grand Prix (JGP) series in September 2016, placing fourth in Ljubljana, Slovenia. In October, she received the bronze medal at a JGP event in Dresden, Germany. In January 2017, she won her first senior national title. In March, Lim placed fourth overall at the 2017 World Junior Championships, scoring personal bests in every segment of the competition in her ISU championship debut.

=== 2017–2018 season: Second JGP medal ===
Lim started the season with a silver medal at the Asian Open Trophy in August. In September, she received the silver medal at JGP Salzburg, Austria, with a score of 186.34. She surpassed her old record, with a difference of almost six points. In her next JGP event, in Gdańsk, she received a score of 58.60 after struggling on the first spin of her program and an edge warning on her opening combination, a triple flip-triple toe loop. In the free skate, she received another unclear edge in her flip jump and popped a triple toe loop in her double axel, triple toe loop combination. Lim later suffered a fall on a triple Salchow, along with a jump repetition violation on her double axel, double toe loop combination near the end of her program, after doing it again halfway through her program. With a final score of 162.58, she placed fourth overall, losing her chance of making it to the Junior Grand Prix Final.

Lim announced at the beginning of December that she was diagnosed with a fracture on her right big toe.

In January, she placed third at the national championships. Lim was subsequently named as part of Korea's team to the 2018 World Junior Championships. She would place fifth in the short program and 6th in the free skate to finish fifth overall.

On April 18, it was reported that she would be moving to the United States to train with Rafael Arutyunyan at his California camp.

=== 2018–2019 season: Senior international debut ===
Lim started the 2018–2019 season with a win at the 2018 CS Asian Open Trophy, placing first in the short program and second in the free. She obtained a personal best in the short with a score of 68.09. Lim's second competition was the 2018 CS U.S. International Figure Skating Classic. At the event, she won a silver medal behind Satoko Miyahara of Japan and ahead of Kim Ye-lim, her Korean teammate.

About a month later, at the 2018 NHK Trophy, Lim earned a personal best of 69.78 in the short program, placing fourth. However, she struggled in the free program, receiving a score of 126.53. She finished the competition in sixth place with a score of 196.31.

At the 2018 Rostelecom Cup, Lim placed sixth in the short, missing her opening combination and stepping out on both her double axel and triple flip. However, she rebounded in the free program, skating cleanly and scoring a personal best in the free program, finishing third and winning her first senior medal on the Grand Prix circuit. She commented: "I have to skate better in my next competition, but overall I am satisfied. This season is really important for me because it is my first senior season."

After winning the silver medal at South Korea's national championships, finishing behind You Young, and was assigned to the Four Continents Championships, and as South Korea's lone ladies' entry to the 2019 World Championships. At Four Continents, Lim placed fourth in the short program, with what would have been a new personal best score but for a one-point deduction for a time violation. The free skate proved a disappointment by comparison, with several bad landings dropping her to eighth place overall. Discussing her performance afterward, she said, "I felt like everything is not working today. It’s just an experience. I don’t think today I had any part that’s good."

Lim went on to finish tenth at the 2019 World Championships, qualifying two spots for South Korea for the 2020 World Championships. Lim's World Championship debut was overshadowed by controversy when accusations were made that Lim had been deliberately injured in practice by American skater Mariah Bell, who also trained with Rafael Arutyunyan. Lim had been skating slowly near the right-side boards of the rink and Bell struck Lim's calf with her skate toe pick while making a turn during her run-through. Lim had to immediately stop her practice session to receive urgent medical treatment from the on-site medical staff outside the rink. Her left calf had swelled up as a result of the incident. An investigation by the ISU subsequently found "no evidence" to support the allegation.

In 2023, Lim spoke up regarding the incident, saying, “It was an issue between the two of us, and there were conflicts. I cannot prove whether the incident (collision) was intentional or not. Only she knows.”

Lim performing a spiral at the 2019 Skate America

=== 2019–2020 season ===
Following the controversy at the World Championships, Lim departed Arutyunyan's camp and returned to Korea for training with her former coaches. Lim began her season with her new coach at 2019 CS Autumn Classic International, where she ranked fifth in the short program and third in the free, winning the bronze medal. She won a second bronze medal at the 2019 Shanghai Trophy.

Beginning the Grand Prix at 2019 Skate America, Lim was eighth in the short program following multiple jump errors. She rose to fifth place overall in the free skate. Lim continued with struggles at the 2019 NHK Trophy, her second Grand Prix. In the short program, she had errors on her triple Lutz-triple toe loop combination, and in her free skate, she had multiple falls and numerous under rotations leading her to finish seventh overall. She was seventh as well at the 2020 South Korean Championships, but as several of the skaters ahead of her were senior-ineligible, she was sent to the 2020 Four Continents Championships, held that year in Seoul. She finished eighth at Four Continents, saying, " I couldn't be fully satisfied. So what I can do is practice hard and show good performances next year."

=== 2020–2021 season ===
With the COVID-19 pandemic greatly curtailing international opportunities for Korean skaters, Lim competed first at the 2021 South Korean Championships, placing sixth.

=== 2021–2022 season ===
Returning to international competition, Lim's first Grand Prix assignment was initially the 2021 Cup of China, but following that event's cancellation, she was reassigned to the 2021 Gran Premio d'Italia in Turin. She finished in sixth place at the event. The following week, she competed at her second event, 2021 NHK Trophy, where she was fifth in the short program. In the free skate, she aborted the takeoff on her planned triple flip and did not replace it, ending up with only six jumping passes instead of the allowed seven and ending up sixth in that segment, but remained in fifth overall.

At the 2022 Korean Championships, Lim placed sixth in the short program but ninth in the free skate, dropping to ninth-place overall.

=== 2022–2023 season ===
Although assigned to compete at 2022 Skate Canada, Lim withdrew and opted to sit out of the 2022–23 figure skating season.

On July 11, 2023, Lim announced her retirement from competitive figure skating, citing her failure to qualify for the 2022 Beijing Olympics and a loss of competitive motivation as her main reasons.

== Post-competitive career ==
Since retiring from competitive figure skating, Lim began choreographing for former coach, Choi Hyung-kyung's students. Her clients have included Kim Chae-yeon and Lee Jae-keun.

In August 2024, Lim starred as the lead role in a South Korean musical ice show, titled, "G-SHOW: THE LUNA." In February 2025, Lim, alongside fellow retired figure skaters, Choi Da-bin and Wi Seoyeong, were invited to perform together during the Gala at the 2025 Four Continents Championships, which were held in Seoul.

== Programs ==
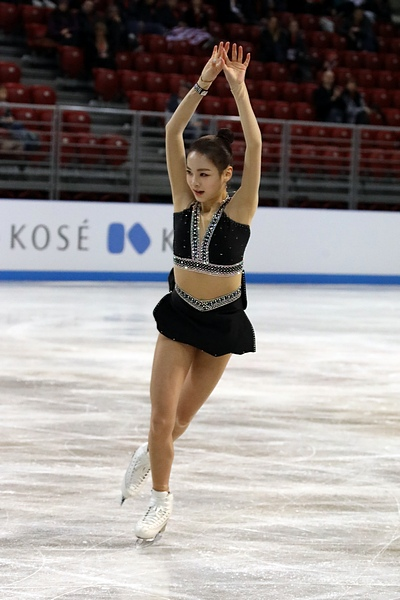
Lim at the 2018 World Junior Championships

Season	Short program	Free skating	Exhibition
2021–2022	El Tango de Roxanne (from Moulin Rouge!) by Ewan McGregor, Jacek Koman, & José Feliciano choreo. by Shin Yea-ji	East of Eden by Lee Holdridge choreo. by Jeffrey Buttle	
2020–2021	Capriccio Espagnol by Nikolai Rimsky-Korsakov choreo. by David Wilson	East of Eden by Lee Holdridge choreo. by Jeffrey Buttle	
2019–2020	Somewhere in Time by John Barry choreo. by Jeffrey Buttle; Capriccio Espagnol by Nikolai Rimsky-Korsakov choreo. by David Wilson	Sabrina by John Williams choreo. by David Wilson	Is That Alright? by Lady Gaga choreo. by Shin Yea-ji
2018–2019	Somewhere in Time by John Barry choreo. by Jeffrey Buttle	Roxie performed by Renée Zellweger; Nowadays / Hot Honey Rag performed by Renée Zellweger & Catherine Zeta-Jones (from Chicago) by John Kander & Fred Ebb choreo. by Akiko Suzuki	Is That Alright? by Lady Gaga choreo. by Shin Yea-ji; Make Me Feel by Janelle Monáe choreo. by Shin Yea-ji; Havana by Camila Cabello feat. Young Thug choreo. by Jeffrey Buttle
2017–2018	Rich Man's Frug (from Sweet Charity) by Cy Coleman, Dorothy Fields choreo. by Scott Brown	Grand Guignol by Bajofondo; Oblivion; Libertango by Astor Piazzolla choreo. by Cindy Stuart	Havana by Camila Cabello feat. Young Thug choreo. by Jeffrey Buttle; Swish Swish by Katy Perry choreo. by Misha Ge
2016–2017	Besame Mucho by Thalía choreo. by Shin Yea-ji	Miss Saigon by Claude-Michel Schönberg choreo. by Alex Chang	Let's Have a Kiki covered by the Glee cast feat. Sarah Jessica Parker; Besame Mucho by Thalía choreo. by Shin Yea-ji
2015–2016	Rab Ne Bana Di Jodi composed by Salim–Sulaiman choreo. by Kenji Miyamoto	The Artist by Ludovic Bource choreo. by Cindy Stuart	Let's Have a Kiki covered by the Glee cast feat. Sarah Jessica Parker
2014–2015	Rab Ne Bana Di Jodi composed by Salim–Sulaiman choreo. by Kenji Miyamoto	The Pink Panther composed by Henry Mancini choreo. by Shin Yea-ji	
2013–2014	Evita by Andrew Lloyd Webber choreo. by Shin Yea-ji	The Pink Panther composed by Henry Mancini choreo. by Shin Yea-ji	
2012–2013	Evita by Andrew Lloyd Webber choreo. by Shin Yea-ji	Kung Fu Panda by Hans Zimmer choreo. by Shin Yea-ji	
2011–2012		Kung Fu Panda by Hans Zimmer choreo. by Shin Yea-ji	

== Competitive highlights ==
- GP – Event of the ISU Grand Prix Series
- JGP – Event of the ISU Junior Grand Prix Series
- CS – Event of the ISU Challenger Series
- C – Event was cancelled
- WD – Withdrew from event

Competition placements at senior level
Season	2014-15	2015-16	2016-17	2017-18	2018-19	2019-20	2020-21	2021-22	2022-23
World Championships					10th				
Four Continents Championships					7th	8th			
South Korean Championships	9th	3rd	1st	3rd	2nd	7th	6th	9th	
GP Cup of China								C	
GP Italy								8th	
GP NHK Trophy					6th	7th		5th	
GP Rostelecom Cup					3rd				
GP Skate America						5th			
GP Skate Canada									WD
CS Asian Open					1st	1st		WD	
CS Autumn Classic						3rd			
CS U.S. Classic					2nd				
Shanghai Trophy						3rd			

Competition placements at junior level
Season	2013–14	2016–17	2017-18
Junior World Championships		4th	5th
South Korean Championships	4th		
JGP Austria			2nd
JGP Germany		3rd	
JGP Poland			4th
JGP Slovenia		4th	
Asian Open		3rd	2nd

Competition placements at novice level
Season	2012–13	2013-14
South Korean Championships	4th	
Asian Open		1st

== Detailed results ==
ISU personal best scores in the +5/-5 GOE System
Segment	Type	Score	Event
Total	**TSS**	**205.57**	2019 World Championships
Short program	**TSS**	**72.91**	2019 World Championships
Short program	TES	40.43	2019 World Championships
Short program	PCS	33.46	2020 Four Continents
Free skating	**TSS**	**132.66**	2019 World Championships
Free skating	TES	67.71	2019 World Championships
Free skating	PCS	67.42	2020 Four Continents

=== Senior level ===
- ISU Personal Bests highlighted in **bold**.

Results in the 2018-19 season
Date	Event	SP		FS		Total	
Date	Event	P	Score	P	Score	P	Score
Aug 1 – 5, 2018	(Thailand) 2016 Asian Open Trophy	1	68.09	2	116.24	1	184.33
Sep 12 – 16, 2018	(United States) 2018 CS U.S. Classic	2	64.85	2	122.45	2	187.30
Nov 9 – 11, 2018	(Japan) 2018 NHK Trophy	4	69.78	6	126.53	6	196.31
Nov 16 – 18, 2018	(Russia) 2018 Rostelecom Cup	6	57.76	3	127.91	3	185.67
Jan 11 – 13, 2019	(South Korea) 2019 South Korean Championships	2	67.14	2	127.06	2	194.20
Feb 7 – 10, 2019	(United States) 2019 Four Continents Championships	4	69.14	8	122.71	7	191.85
Mar 18 – 24, 2019	(Japan) 2019 World Championships	5	**72.91**	10	**132.66**	10	**205.57**

Results in the 2019–20 season
Date	Event	SP		FS		Total	
Date	Event	P	Score	P	Score	P	Score
Sep 12 – 14, 2019	(Canada) 2019 CS Autumn Classic International	5	56.31	3	128.07	3	184.38
Oct 3 – 5, 2019	(China) 2019 Shanghai Trophy	3	62.87	1	121.77	3	184.64
Oct 18 – 20, 2019	(United States) 2019 Skate America	8	63.96	5	120.54	5	184.50
Oct 30 – Nov 3, 2019	(China) 2019 CS Asian Open	1	66.84	1	130.79	1	197.63
Nov 22 – 24, 2019	(Japan) 2019 NHK Trophy	6	65.28	10	107.19	7	172.47
Jan 3 – 5, 2020	(South Korea) 2020 South Korean Championships	4	63.95	7	118.63	7	182.58
Feb 4 – 9, 2020	(South Korea) 2020 Four Continents Championships	6	68.40	7	132.19	8	200.59

Results in the 2020–21 season
Date	Event	SP		FS		Total	
Date	Event	P	Score	P	Score	P	Score
Feb 24 – 26, 2021	(South Korea) 2021 South Korean Championships	4	67.25	9	111.81	6	179.06

Results in the 2021–22 season
Date	Event	SP		FS		Total	
Date	Event	P	Score	P	Score	P	Score
Nov 5 – 7, 2021	(Italy) 2021 Gran Premio d'Italia	6	67.03	8	112.55	8	179.58
Nov 12 – 14, 2021	(Japan) 2021 NHK Trophy	5	65.23	6	121.45	5	186.68
Jan 7 – 9, 2022	(South Korea) 2022 South Korean Championships	6	66.04	9	121.41	9	187.45

=== Junior level ===
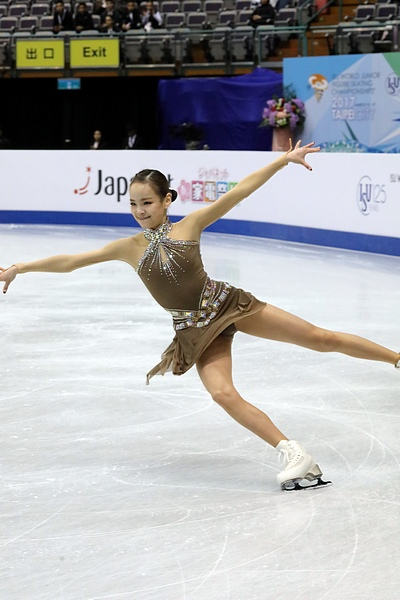
Lim at the 2017 World Junior Championships.

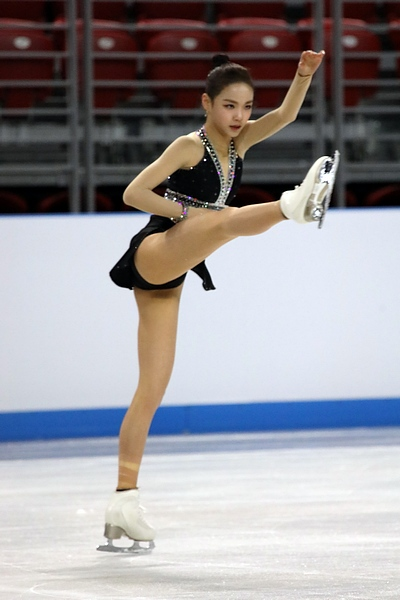
Lim at the 2018 World Junior Championships

Results in the 2012-13 season
Date	Event	SP		FS		Total	
Date	Event	P	Score	P	Score	P	Score
Jan 4 – 6, 2013	(South Korea) 2013 South Korean Championships (Novice)	7	27.20	3	50.32	4	77.52

Results in the 2013-14 season
Date	Event	SP		FS		Total	
Date	Event	P	Score	P	Score	P	Score
Aug 8 – 11, 2013	(Thailand) 2013 Asian Open Trophy (Novice)	—N/a	—N/a	1	41.97	1	41.97
Jan 3 – 5, 2014	(South Korea) 2014 South Korean Championships (Junior)	1	48.90	6	82.46	4	131.36

Results in the 2014-15 season
Date	Event	SP		FS		Total	
Date	Event	P	Score	P	Score	P	Score
Jan 7 – 9, 2015	(South Korea) 2015 South Korean Championships (Senior)	8	51.10	10	89.53	9	140.63

Results in the 2015-16 season
Date	Event	SP		FS		Total	
Date	Event	P	Score	P	Score	P	Score
Jan 8 – 10, 2016	(South Korea) 2016 South Korean Championships (Senior)	4	59.33	3	116.64	3	175.97

Results in the 2016-17 season
Date	Event	SP		FS		Total	
Date	Event	P	Score	P	Score	P	Score
Aug 4 – 5, 2016	(Philippines) 2016 Asian Open Trophy	2	60.61	3	108.44	3	169.05
Sep 21 – 25, 2016	2016 JGP Slovenia	6	55.88	3	111.03	4	166.91
Oct 5 – 9, 2016	2016 JGP Germany	2	63.83	5	109.38	3	173.21
Jan 6 – 8, 2017	(South Korea) 2017 South Korean Championships (Senior)	1	64.53	1	127.45	1	191.98
Mar 15 – 19, 2017	(Taiwan) 2017 World Junior Championships	4	64.78	4	116.03	4	180.81

Results in the 2017-18 season
Date	Event	SP		FS		Total	
Date	Event	P	Score	P	Score	P	Score
Aug 2 – 5, 2017	(Hong Kong) 2017 Asian Open Trophy	3	58.43	2	118.82	2	177.25
Sep 2 – Aug 31, 2017	2017 JGP Austria	2	64.79	2	121.55	2	186.34
Oct 4 – 7, 2017	(Poland) 2017 JGP Austria	4	58.60	5	103.98	4	162.58
Jan 5 – 7, 2018	(South Korea) 2018 South Korean Championships (Senior)	2	66.10	4	119.78	3	185.88
Mar 5 – 11, 2018	(Bulgaria) 2018 World Junior Championships	5	62.96	6	122.16	5	185.12

== Awards and recognition ==
Year	Awards
2017	Harper's Bazaar: January Issue Model

World Record Holders
Preceded by —	Ladies' Short Program; 4 August 2018 – 23 August 2018	Succeeded by (Russia) Anna Shcherbakova
Preceded by —	Ladies' Total Score; 5 August 2018 – 25 August 2018	Succeeded by (Russia) Anna Shcherbakova
