= Ji Seo-yeon =

South Korean figure skater (born 2005)

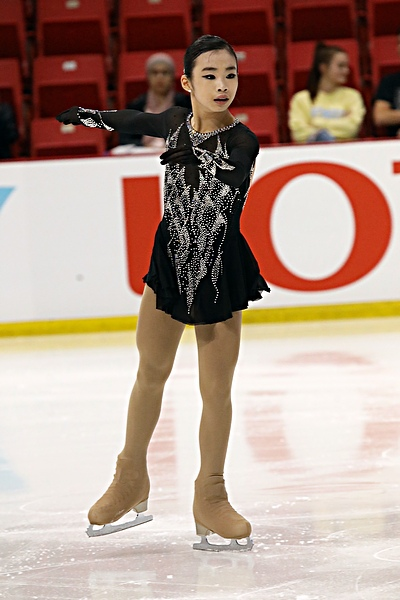
- Ji at the 2019 JGP United States

Personal information
- Native name: 지서연
- Born: December 26, 2005 (age 20) Daejeon, South Korea
- Home town: Gunpo, South Korea
- Height: 1.59 m (5 ft 2 1/2 in)

Figure skating career
- Country: South Korea
- Coach: Tammy Gambill; Kim Soo-hyun

Ji Seo-yeon (Korean: 지서연; born December 26, 2005) is a South Korean figure skater. She is the 2021 CS Autumn Classic International bronze medalist.

== Programs ==
Season	Short program	Free skating
2022–2024	Song for the Little Sparrow by Abel Korzeniowski performed by Patricia Kaas choreo. by Ilona Melnichenko, Drew Meekins	The Matrix Resurrections by Johnny Klimek and Tom Tykwer choreo. by Misha Ge
2021–2022	Danse macabre by Camille Saint-Saëns choreo. by Drew Meekins	Piano Concerto No. 2 by Sergei Rachmaninoff choreo. by Drew Meekins
2020–2021	El Tango de Roxanne (from Moulin Rouge!) choreo. by David Wilson	West Side Story by Leonard Bernstein choreo. by Shin Yea-ji
2019–2020	Dance of the Dead choreo. by Shin Yea-ji	Lovely choreo. by Shin Yea-ji

== Competitive highlights ==
GP: Grand Prix; CS: Challenger Series; JGP: Junior Grand Prix

International
Event	17–18	18–19	19–20	20–21	21–22	22–23	23–24
GP NHK Trophy						6th	
CS Autumn Classic					3rd		
CS Budapest Trophy						WD	
CS Golden Spin							WD
CS Warsaw Cup							WD
International: Junior
JGP France I					4th		
JGP France II					4th		
JGP Poland			6th				
JGP United States			4th				
Asian Open			2nd				
Triglav Trophy	1st N						
National
South Korean		7th	6th	7th	8th	WD	
Ranking Comp.			6th	11th	8th	14th	
^{1}JGP France I; ^{2}JGP France II; TBD = Assigned; WD = Withdrew; Levels: N = Advanced novice

== Detailed results ==
=== Senior results ===
2022–2023 season
Date	Event	SP	FS	Total
November 18–20, 2022	2022 NHK Trophy	6; 62.92	7; 121.22	6; 184.14

=== Junior-level results ===
2021–22 season
Date	Event	Level	SP	FS	Total
January 7–9, 2022	2022 South Korean Championships	Senior	10; 62.05	7; 129.31	8; 191.36
September 16–18, 2021	2021 CS Autumn Classic International	Senior	2; 60.67	4; 113.02	3; 173.69
August 25–28, 2021	2021 JGP France II	Junior	8; 50.88	3; 119.67	4; 170.55
August 18–21, 2021	2021 JGP France I	Junior	4; 56.15	3; 115.91	4; 172.06
2020–21 season
Date	Event	Level	SP	FS	Total
February 24–26, 2021	2021 South Korean Championships	Senior	8; 61.46	6; 116.24	7; 177.70
2019–20 season
Date	Event	Level	SP	FS	Total
January 3–5, 2020	2020 South Korean Championships	Senior	5; 63.55	6; 122.72	6; 186.27
Oct. 30 – Nov. 1, 2019	2019 Asian Open Trophy	Junior	2; 63.05	2; 100.35	2; 163.40
September 18–21, 2019	2019 JGP Poland	Junior	6; 61.92	5; 115.53	6; 177.45
August 28–31, 2019	2019 JGP United States	Junior	2; 67.23	4; 112.00	4; 179.23
2018–19 season
Date	Event	Level	SP	FS	Total
January 11–13, 2019	2019 South Korean Championships	Senior	7; 59.06	7; 108.98	7; 168.04
