= Kim Ha-nul (figure skater) =

South Korean figure skater

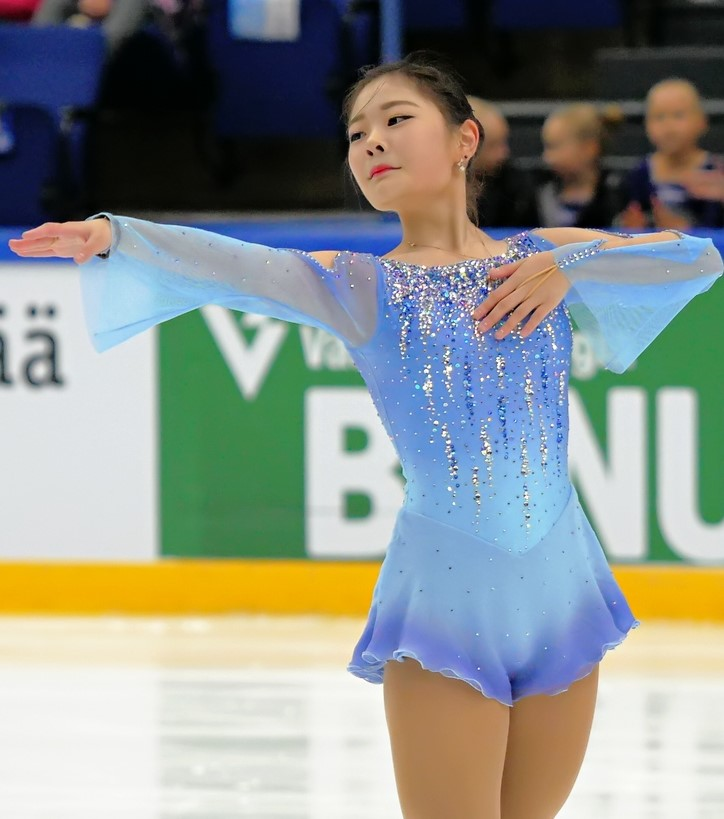
- Kim Ha-nul at the 2018 CS Finlandia Trophy

Personal information
- Native name: 김하늘
- Other names: Ha-neul
- Born: April 11, 2002 (age 24) Anyang, Gyeonggi Province, South Korea
- Home town: Anyang, Gyeonggi-do, South Korea
- Height: 1.49 m (4 ft 11 in)

Figure skating career
- Country: South Korea
- Coach: Choi Hyung-kyung
- Skating club: Gwacheon SC
- Began skating: 2010

Kim Ha-nul (Korean: 김하늘; born April 11, 2002) is a South Korean figure skater. She represented South Korea at the 2018 Winter Olympics and has placed in the top ten at two ISU Championships – the 2018 Four Continents Championships and 2016 World Junior Championships.

== Career ==
=== Early years ===
Kim began learning to skate in 2010. Nationally, she finished 13th on the novice level in 2012 and 6th as a junior in 2013. Making her first appearance on the senior level, she placed 11th at the 2014 South Korean Championships, but was 22nd in 2015.

=== 2015–2016 to 2016–2017 ===
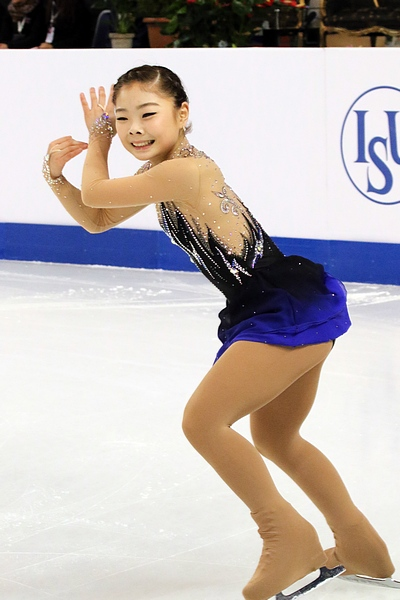
Kim at the 2016 Junior Worlds

Kim placed fourth in August 2015 during a Korean competition to select skaters for the ISU Junior Grand Prix (JGP) series. She made her JGP debut in September, finishing 13th in Colorado Springs, Colorado. She placed 7th in senior ladies at the 2016 South Korean Championships and was named in Korea's team to the 2016 World Junior Championships in Debrecen. Ranked 12th in the short program and 9th in the free skate, she finished 9th overall in Hungary.

The following season, she appeared at two JGP events and placed 8th at the 2017 South Korean Championships.

=== 2017–2018 season ===
In January, Kim placed 4th at the 2018 South Korean Championships and then 6th at the 2018 Four Continents Championships in Taipei, Taiwan.In February, she competed at the 2018 Winter Olympics in PyeongChang, South Korea. She ranked 21st in the short program, 10th in the free skate, and 13th overall. Concluding her season, she finished 15th at the 2018 World Championships, which took place in March in Milan, Italy.

== Programs ==
Season	Short program	Free skating	Exhibition
2019–2020	It Must Have Been Love by Roxette; Oh, Pretty Woman by Roy Orbison	Miss Saigon by Claude-Michel Schönberg	
2018–2019	River Flows in You by Yiruma	Simple Song No. 3 (from "Youth" soundtrack) by David Lang performed by Sumi Jo	
2017–2018	The Piano by Michael Nyman choreo. by Alex Chang	Mamma Mia!: Thank You for the Music; The Winner Takes It All by Benny Andersson, Björn Ulvaeus choreo. by Shin Yea-Ji	New Face by Psy choreo. by Lee June-hyoung
2016–2017	One Day by Caro Emerald; It Don't Mean a Thing by Pep's Show Boys, Sebastian Roser	Roméo et Juliette by Gérard Presgurvic	
2015–2016	Once Upon A Dream (from Jekyll & Hyde)	Kung Fu Panda by Hans Zimmer	
2013–2015	Peter Gunn by Deodato	Snow White and the Huntsman performed by James Newton Howard	
2012–2013	Sing, Sing, Sing by Benny Goodman	Assassin's Tango (from Mr. & Mrs. Smith) by John Powell	
2011–2012	Sing, Sing, Sing by Benny Goodman	One Summer Day (from Spirited Away) by Joe Hisaishi	
2010–2011		One Summer Day (from Spirited Away) by Joe Hisaishi	

== Competitive highlights ==
GP: Grand Prix; JGP: ISU Junior Grand Prix; CS: Challenger Series

International
Event	11–12	12–13	13–14	14–15	15–16	16–17	17–18	18–19	19–20	20–21	21-22
Olympics							13th				
Worlds							15th				
Four Continents							6th	13th			
GP Finland								7th			
CS Asian Open									2nd		
CS Finlandia								10th			
CS Ice Star							7th		2nd		
CS Ondrej Nepela									3rd		
Philadelphia							3rd				
Shanghai Trophy							4th				
International: Junior
Junior Worlds					9th						
JGP Czech Rep.						5th					
JGP Russia						6th					
JGP U.S.					13th						
Asian Trophy					4th						
International: Advanced novice
Asian Trophy				5th							
National
South Korean	13th N	6th J	11th	22nd	7th	8th	4th	9th	5th	11th	16th
TBD = Assigned; WD = Withdrew; Levels: N = Novice; J = Junior

== Detailed results ==
ISU Personal best highlighted in bold.

=== Senior level ===
2021–22 season
Date	Event	SP	FS	Total
January 7–9, 2022	2022 South Korean Championships	16; 53.22	16; 104.78	16; 158.00
2020–21 season
Date	Event	SP	FS	Total
February 24–26, 2021	2021 South Korean Championships	11; 53.98	8; 112.00	11; 165.98
2019–20 season
Date	Event	SP	FS	Total
January 3–5, 2020	2020 South Korean Championships	7; 63.17	4; 124.28	5; 187.45
Oct. 30 – Nov. 3, 2019	2019 CS Asian Open Trophy	3; 60.04	2; 117.88	2; 177.92
October 18–20, 2019	2019 CS Ice Star	4; 53.93	2; **124.89**	2; 178.82
September 19–21, 2019	2019 CS Ondrej Nepela Memorial	2; **62.59**	4; 119.91	3; **182.50**
2018–19 season
Date	Event	SP	FS	Total
February 7–10, 2019	2019 Four Continents Championships	17; 51.44	10; 111.04	13; 162.48
January 11–13, 2019	2019 South Korean Championships	8; 56.60	10; 104.56	9; 161.16
November 2–4, 2018	2018 Grand Prix of Helsinki	8; 55.38	8; 104.77	7; 160.15
October 4–7, 2018	2018 CS Finlandia Trophy	9; 53.76	11; 99.46	10; 153.22
2017–18 season
Date	Event	SP	FS	Total
March 19–25, 2018	2018 World Championships	14; 60.14	15; 110.54	15; 170.68
February 14–23, 2018	2018 Winter Olympics	21; 54.33	10; 121.38	13; 175.71
January 22–28, 2018	2018 Four Continents Championships	6; 61.15	8; 111.95	6; 173.10
January 5–7, 2018	2018 South Korean Championships	6; 62.18	5; 114.74	4; 176.92
November 24–26, 2017	2017 ISU Shanghai Trophy	–	4; 109.85	4
October 26–29, 2017	2017 CS Minsk-Arena Ice Star	8; 51.91	6; 101.59	7; 153.50
August 3–6, 2017	2017 Philadelphia Summer International	5; 56.80	1; 123.61	3; 180.41

=== Junior level ===
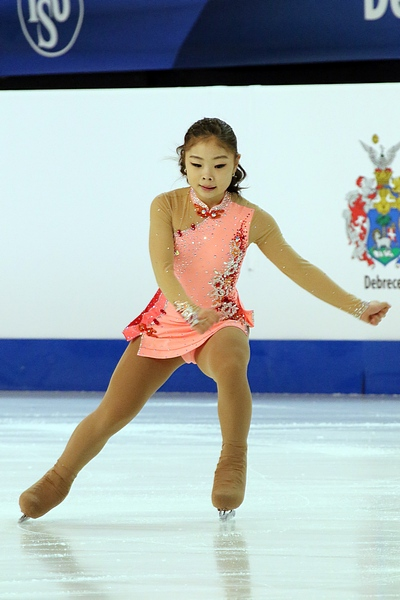
Kim at the 2016 World Junior Championships

2016–17 season
Date	Event	Level	SP	FS	Total
January 6–8, 2017	2017 South Korean Championships	Senior	14; 50.31	6; 117.25	8; 167.56
September 14–18, 2016	2016 JGP Russia	Junior	5; 56.97	6; 98.78	6; 155.75
Aug. 31 – Sept. 4, 2016	2016 JGP Czech Republic	Junior	7; 51.08	5; 98.17	5; 149.25
2015–16 season
Date	Event	Level	SP	FS	Total
March 14–20, 2016	2016 World Junior Championships	Junior	12; 52.37	9; 97.99	9; 150.36
January 8–10, 2016	2016 South Korean Championships	Senior	7; 54.32	7; 104.43	7; 158.75
September 2–5, 2015	2015 JGP United States	Junior	10; 46.41	12; 72.00	13; 118.41
August 5–8, 2015	2015 Asian Open Trophy	Junior	3; 42.38	4; 79.82	4; 122.20
2014–15 season
Date	Event	Level	SP	FS	Total
January 7–9, 2015	2015 South Korean Championships	Senior	20; 44.82	22; 76.03	22; 120.85
August 6–10, 2014	2014 Asian Open Trophy	Novice	5; 30.52	5; 71.37	5; 101.89
2013–14 season
Date	Event	Level	SP	FS	Total
January 3–5, 2014	2014 South Korean Championships	Senior	12; 50.04	11; 90.19	11; 140.23
2012–13 season
Date	Event	Level	SP	FS	Total
January 2–6, 2013	2013 South Korean Championships	Junior	5; 39.44	6; 72.43	6; 111.87
2011–12 season
Date	Event	Level	SP	FS	Total
January 4–8, 2012	2012 South Korean Championships	Novice	– –	– –	13; 67.92
