= 2018 South Korean Figure Skating Championships =

Figure skating competition

- Type: National Championship
- Date: January 5 – 7
- Season: 2017–18
- Location: Seoul
- Venue: Mokdong Ice Link

Champions
- Men's singles: Cha Jun-hwan
- Ladies' singles: You Young
- Pairs: Kim Kyu-eun / Alex Kang-chan Kam
- Ice dance: Yura Min / Alexander Gamelin
- Previous: 2017 South Korean Championships
- Next: 2019 South Korean Championships

The 2018 South Korean Figure Skating Championships (Korean: 제72회 전국 남녀 피겨스케이팅 종합선수권대회) were held from January 5–7, 2018 at the Mokdong Ice Rink in Seoul. It was organized by Korea Skating Union. This was the 72nd edition of those championships held.

Skaters competed in the disciplines of men's singles, ladies' singles, ice dancing on the senior, junior levels and pair skating on the senior levels for the title of national champion of South Korea. The results of the national championships were used to choose the Korean teams to the 2018 World Junior Championships, 2018 World Championships and 2018 Winter Olympics.

== Senior results ==
Cha Jun-hwan and You Young both won their second senior national titles.

=== Senior men ===
| Rank | Name | Total points | SP | | FS | |
|---|---|---|---|---|---|---|
| 1 | Cha Jun-hwan | 252.65 | 1 | 84.05 | 1 | 168.60 |
| 2 | Kim Jin-seo | 227.65 | 3 | 76.05 | 2 | 151.18 |
| 3 | Lee June-hyoung | 222.98 | 2 | 76.80 | 3 | 146.18 |
| 4 | Lee Si-hyeong | 208.49 | 4 | 70.46 | 4 | 138.03 |
| 5 | Cha Young-hyun | 195.42 | 7 | 61.23 | 5 | 134.19 |
| 6 | Byun Se-jong | 191.27 | 5 | 63.00 | 6 | 128.27 |
| 7 | An Geon-hyeong | 184.00 | 9 | 58.04 | 7 | 125.96 |
| 8 | Park Sung-hoon | 166.99 | 8 | 58.12 | 8 | 108.87 |
| 9 | Kyeong Jae-seok | 164.20 | 6 | 61.80 | 9 | 102.40 |

=== Senior ladies ===
| Rank | Name | Total points | SP | | FS | |
|---|---|---|---|---|---|---|
| 1 | You Young | 204.68 | 1 | 69.53 | 1 | 135.15 |
| 2 | Choi Da-bin | 190.12 | 4 | 64.11 | 2 | 126.01 |
| 3 | Lim Eun-soo | 185.88 | 2 | 66.10 | 4 | 119.78 |
| 4 | Kim Ha-nul | 176.92 | 6 | 62.18 | 5 | 114.74 |
| 5 | Park So-youn | 176.57 | 5 | 62.74 | 6 | 113.83 |
| 6 | Kim Ye-lim | 176.02 | 3 | 64.53 | 8 | 111.49 |
| 7 | To Ji-hun | 172.11 | 13 | 51.30 | 3 | 120.81 |
| 8 | Choi Yu-jin | 166.34 | 8 | 54.55 | 7 | 111.79 |
| 9 | Lee Hae-in | 165.24 | 7 | 57.64 | 10 | 107.60 |
| 10 | Lee Hyun-soo | 162.98 | 11 | 53.74 | 9 | 109.24 |
| 11 | Jeon Su-Been | 161.26 | 9 | 54.48 | 12 | 106.78 |
| 12 | Choi So-eun | 154.79 | 14 | 51.16 | 13 | 103.63 |
| 13 | An So-hyun | 153.69 | 20 | 46.77 | 11 | 106.92 |
| 14 | Kim Na-hyun | 147.27 | 10 | 53.83 | 15 | 93.44 |
| 15 | Lee Ji-won | 145.43 | 18 | 49.32 | 14 | 96.11 |
| 16 | Yu Seung-been | 139.18 | 15 | 51.00 | 19 | 88.18 |
| 17 | Choi Hyun-soo | 138.81 | 12 | 51.88 | 20 | 86.93 |
| 18 | Kim Hae-jin | 138.36 | 21 | 46.54 | 16 | 91.82 |
| 19 | Park Mi-seon | 138.21 | 19 | 46.91 | 18 | 91.30 |
| 20 | Lee Ji-hyun | 137.69 | 22 | 46.21 | 17 | 91.48 |
| 21 | Lee Seo-young | 136.99 | 17 | 50.85 | 21 | 86.14 |
| 22 | Jeon Geo-hee | 133.90 | 16 | 51.00 | 22 | 82.90 |
| 23 | Seo Ye-eun | 124.83 | 23 | 45.79 | 23 | 79.04 |
| 24 | Noh Chae-eun | 119.44 | 24 | 44.39 | 24 | 75.05 |
Did not advance to free skating
| 25 | Kim Bo-young | 43.46 | 25 | 43.46 | — | |
| 26 | Kim Se-na | 43.09 | 26 | 43.09 | — | |
| 27 | Ko Eun-bi | 42.36 | 27 | 42.36 | — | |
| 28 | Kwon Ye-na | 39.13 | 28 | 39.13 | — | |
| 29 | Kang Soo-min | 37.19 | 29 | 37.19 | — | |
| 30 | Lee Yu-rim | 36.97 | 30 | 36.97 | — | |
| 31 | Son Suh-hyun | 35.17 | 31 | 35.17 | — | |
| 32 | Jang Hyun-su | 34.16 | 32 | 34.16 | — | |
| 33 | Cho Yu-bin | 29.33 | 33 | 29.33 | — | |

=== Senior pairs ===
| Rank | Name | Total points | SP | | FS | |
|---|---|---|---|---|---|---|
| 1 | Kim Kyu-eun / Alex Kang-chan Kam | 139.54 | 1 | 51.88 | 1 | 87.66 |

=== Senior ice dance ===
| Rank | Name | Total points | SD | | FD | |
|---|---|---|---|---|---|---|
| 1 | Yura Min / Alexander Gamelin | 149.94 | 1 | 59.67 | 1 | 90.27 |

== International team selections ==
=== Four Continents Championships ===
The 2018 Four Continents Figure Skating Championships will be held on 22–28 January 2018, in Taipei City, Chinese Taipei. Based on the results of the 2017 KSU President Cup Ranking Competition from December 1–3, 2017.

| | Men | Ladies | Pairs | Ice dancing |
|---|---|---|---|---|
| 1 | Lee June-hyoung | Choi Da-bin | Kim Kyu-eun / Alex Kang-chan Kam | Yura Min / Alexander Gamelin |
| 2 | Cha Jun-hwan | Kim Ha-nul | — | — |
| 3 | Lee Si-hyeong | Park So-youn | — | — |
| 1st alt. | An Geon-hyeong | Choi Yu-jin | — | — |

=== Winter Olympic Games ===
The 2018 Winter Olympics will be held in Pyeongchang, South Korea, February 9–25, 2018.

| | Men | Ladies | Pairs | Ice dancing |
|---|---|---|---|---|
| 1 | Cha Jun-hwan | Choi Da-bin | Kim Kyu-eun / Alex Kang-chan Kam | Yura Min / Alexander Gamelin |
| 2 | — | Kim Ha-nul | — | — |
| 1st alt. | Lee June-hyoung | Park So-youn | — | — |

=== World Junior Championships ===
The 2018 World Junior Figure Skating Championships will be held in Sofia, Bulgaria, March 5–11, 2018.

| | Men | Ladies |
|---|---|---|
| 1 | Cha Jun-hwan | You Young |
| 2 | Lee Si-hyeong | Lim Eun-soo |
| 1st alt. | Cha Young-hyun | Kim Ye-lim |

=== World Championships ===
The 2018 World Figure Skating Championships will be held in Milan, Italy, March 19–25, 2018.

| | Men | Ladies | Pairs | Ice dancing |
|---|---|---|---|---|
| 1 | Kim Jin-seo | Choi Da-bin | Kim Kyu-eun / Alex Kang-chan Kam | Yura Min / Alexander Gamelin |
| 2 | — | Kim Ha-nul | — | — |
| 1st alt. | Lee June-hyoung | Park So-youn | — | — |
