= Byun Se-jong =

South Korean figure skater (born 1998)

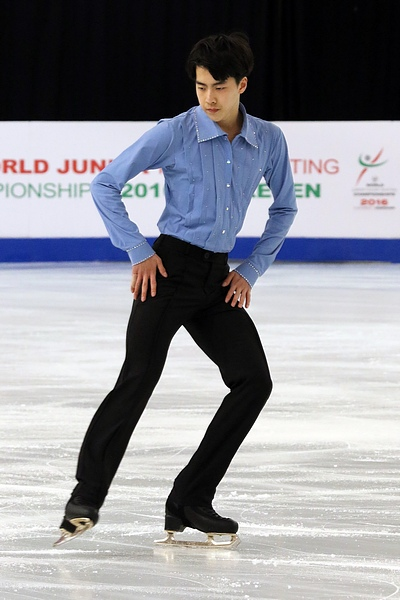
- Byun at the 2016 Junior Worlds

Personal information
- Native name: 변세종
- Full name: Byun Se-jong
- Born: May 4, 1998 (age 28) Daegu, South Korea
- Home town: Daegu
- Height: 1.77 m (5 ft 9 1/2 in)

Figure skating career
- Country: South Korea
- Coach: Chi Hyun-jung

Byun Se-jong (Korean: 변세종; born May 4, 1998) is a South Korean figure skater. He is bronze medalist of 2018 CS Asian Open Trophy, and competed in the free skate at two Four Continents Championships (2015, 2016).

== Career ==
=== 2014–15 season ===
Byun debuted at the Junior Grand Prix series in the 2014–15 season. He placed 9th at the JGP Czech Republic, where he got his personal best free skate and total scores. At the JGP Germany, he placed 11th. A few weeks later, Byun won the silver medal at the Ice Challenge as a junior. Back in Korea, he came in third at a qualification event, the KSU President Cup Ranking Competition, which gave him a spot to compete at the 2015 Four Continents Championships to be held in Seoul, South Korea.

At the South Korean Nationals, he settled in 5th place. In February, he competed at his first senior ISU championship, 2015 Four Continents Championships, where he achieved his new personal best in short program and total score. As the last competition of the season, Byun participated in the Triglav Trophy. In the short program, he placed first and got ratified his first triple-triple combination, triple toe-loop-triple toe-loop. Due to the big margin of points obtained in the short program, he could keep the lead and won the gold for the first time internationally.

=== 2015–16 season ===
Byun began his new season at the ISU Junior Grand Prix qualifying competition held in South Korea. He placed first with a score of 161.39, which guarantees two Junior Grand Prix events. He came in fifth at a qualification event, 2015 KSU President Cup Ranking Competition, which gave him a spot to compete at the 2016 Four Continents Figure Skating Championships to be held in Taipei, Taiwan. At the 2016 Korean National Figure Skating Championships, Byun skated flawlessly, and he placed third after short programme as a result. Then, he placed fourth in total, which meant he kept his spot as the Korean national team member for the upcoming season. At the 2016 World Junior Championships he placed 29th in the short program and did not qualify to the free skating.

== Programs ==
Season	Short program	Free skating
2019–2020	Adiós Nonino choreo. by Scott Brown	Les Misérables by Claude-Michel Schönberg choreo. by Byun Se-Jong
2018–2019	Adiós Nonino choreo. by Scott Brown	Legends of the Fall by James Horner choreo. by Scott Brown
2017–2018	Unchained Melody by Alex North choreo. by Misha Ge	Legends of the Fall by James Horner choreo. by Scott Brown
2016–2017	You Mean Everything To Me by Neil Sedaka choreo. by Lee Kyu-hyun	Notre Dame de Paris by Riccardo Cocciante choreo. by Pasquale Camerlengo
2015–2016	I'm Your Man by Michael Bublé choreo. by Lee Kyu-hyun	The Lord of the Rings by The Piano Guys choreo. by Tom Dickson
2014–2015	Butterflies and Hurricanes by Muse	The Godfather by Nino Rota
2013–2014	Overture (from Beethoven's Last Night) performed by Trans-Siberian Orchestra	Concerto No. 2 in G minor, Op. 8, RV 315, "L'estate" (Summer) III. Presto by Antonio Vivaldi; Verano Porteño (from Eight Seasons: Four Seasons of Buenos Aires) by Astor Piazzolla performed by Gidon Kremer
2012–2013	Music for 18 Musicians (Coldcut Remix); Piano Phase by D*Note (from Reich Remixed) by Steve Reich	Sherlock Holmes: A Game of Shadows by Hans Zimmer
2011–2012	El Triste by Raúl Di Blasio, José José	Feeling Good by Escala; Smooth Criminal by David Garrett
2010–2011	Sing, Sing, Sing by Benny Goodman	Feeling Good by Escala; Smooth Criminal by David Garrett
2009–2010	Sing, Sing, Sing by Benny Goodman	Don't Let Me Be Misunderstood (from The Good, the Bad, the Weird)
2008–2009		Homeland (from Spirit: Stallion of the Cimarron) by Hans Zimmer; Urban Shock (from H.I.T)

== Competitive highlights ==
CS: Challenger Series; JGP: ISU Junior Grand Prix

International : Senior
Event	11–12	12–13	13–14	14–15	15–16	16–17	17–18	18–19	19–20
Four Continents				23rd	18th				
CS Alpen Trophy								22nd	
CS Asian Open								3rd	6th
CS Ice Star							16th		
Universiade								17th	
International: Junior
Junior Worlds					29th				
JGP Czech Rep.				9th		13th			
JGP Germany				11th					
JGP Latvia					9th				
JGP Slovenia						13th			
JGP Spain					14th				
Ice Challenge				2nd J					
Triglav Trophy				1st J					
Asian Trophy		8th J	3rd J			4th J			
National
South Korean	4th J	4th J	7th	5th	4th	4th	6th	7th	

== Detailed results ==
=== Senior level ===
2019–20 season
Date	Event	SP	FS	Total
Oct 30-Nov 3, 2019	2019 CS Asian Open Trophy	5; **70.91**	5; 119.49	6; 190.40
2018–19 season
Date	Event	SP	FS	Total
March 6–9, 2019	2019 Winter Universiade	22; 50.89	15; 106.62	17; 157.51
January 12–13, 2019	2019 South Korean Championships	7; 58.54	8; 105.84	7; 164.38
November 11–18, 2018	2018 CS Alpen Trophy	19; 52.22	23; 81.43	22; 133.65
August 1–5, 2018	2018 CS Asian Open Trophy	2; 65.47	3; **127.91**	3; **193.38**
2017–18 season
Date	Event	SP	FS	Total
January 5–7, 2018	2018 South Korean Championships	5; 63.00	6; 128.27	6; 191.27
October 26–29, 2017	2017 CS Minsk-Arena Ice Star	16; 49.90	16; 103.72	16; 153.62

=== Junior level ===
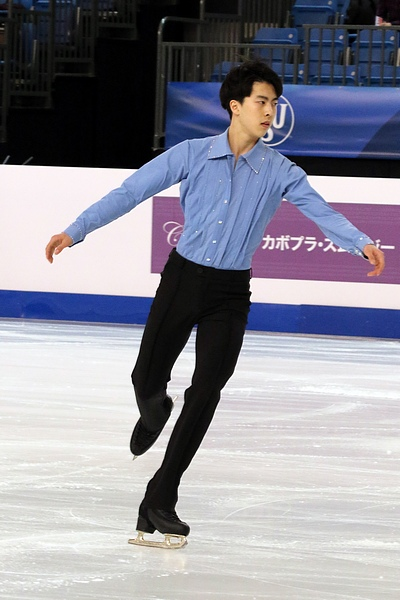
Byun at the 2016 World Junior Championships

2016–17 season
Date	Event	Level	SP	FS	Total
January 7–9, 2017	2017 South Korean Championships	Senior	4; 59.79	4; 123.02	4; 182.81
September 21–24, 2016	2016 JGP Slovenia	Junior	15; 48.87	12; 101.54	13; 150.41
August 31–3, 2016	2016 JGP Czech Republic	Junior	9; 56.16	15; 99.59	13; 155.75
August 4–7, 2016	2016 Asian Open Trophy	Junior	1; 63.01	4; 109.62	4; 172.63
2015–16 season
Date	Event	Level	SP	FS	Total
March 14–20, 2016	2016 World Junior Championships	Junior	29; 50.67	DNQ	–
February 16–21, 2016	2016 Four Continents Championships	Senior	16; 58.30	17; 117.85	18; 176.15
January 8–10, 2016	2016 South Korean Championships	Senior	3; 59.89	4; 120.85	4; 180.74
September 30 – October 4, 2015	2015 JGP Spain	Junior	9; 52.69	14; 96.14	14; 148.83
August 26–30, 2015	2015 JGP Latvia	Junior	13; 50.36	9; 110.89	9; 161.25
2014–15 season
Date	Event	Level	SP	FS	Total
April 15–19, 2015	2015 Triglav Trophy	Junior	1; 56.74	2; 91.39	1; 148.13
February 9–15, 2015	2015 Four Continents Championships	Senior	23; 54.20	23; 100.00	23; 154.20
January 7–9, 2015	2015 South Korean Championships	Senior	5; 52.49	6; 104.72	5; 157.21
November 12–16, 2014	2014 Ice Challenge	Junior	3; 48.16	2; 94.82	2; 142.98
October 1–5, 2014	2014 JGP Germany	Junior	11; 50.67	11; 99.83	11; 150.50
September 3–7, 2014	2014 JGP Czech Republic	Junior	13; 46.55	9; 104.81	9; 151.36
2013–14 season
Date	Event	Level	SP	FS	Total
January 3–5, 2014	2014 South Korean Championships	Senior	7; 51.75	6; 110.28	7; 162.03
August 8–11, 2013	2013 Asian Open Trophy	Junior	3; 46.12	4; 87.51	3; 133.63
2012–13 season
Date	Event	Level	SP	FS	Total
January 2–6, 2013	2013 South Korean Championships	Junior	4; 38.63	4; 71.02	4; 109.65
August 7–12, 2012	2012 Asian Open Trophy	Junior	9; 32.57	7; 72.28	8; 104.85
2011–12 season
Date	Event	Level	SP	FS	Total
January 4–8, 2012	2012 South Korean Championships	Junior	4; 33.60	4; 63.58	4; 97.18

- Personal best highlighted in **bold**.
