= An Geon-hyeong =

South Korean figure skater (born 2000)

Personal information
- Native name: 안건형
- Born: November 15, 2000 (age 25) Daegu, South Korea
- Home town: Gyeonggi Province, South Korea
- Height: 1.73 m (5 ft 8 in)

Figure skating career
- Country: South Korea
- Coach: Chi Hyun-jung
- Began skating: 2009

- An Geon-hyeong
- Hangul: 안건형
- RR: An Geonhyeong
- MR: An Kŏnhyŏng

An Geon-hyeong (Korean: 안건형; born November 15, 2000) is a South Korean figure skater. He is the 2017 Asian Trophy bronze medalist. He competed in the free skating at the 2018 Four Continents Championships.

== Career ==
=== Early career ===
An started skating in 2008 at his hometown, Daegu.

=== Career ===
In August 2015, An placed 3rd at the Korean selection competition with a score 157.15, which guaranteed two Junior Grand Prix events for him. He debuted at the ISU Junior Grand Prix circuit in Slovakia, where he placed 11th, and in Austria, where he placed 12th.

In the 2016/17 season, An finished 6th at the 2017 South Korean Figure Skating Championships.

In September 2017, An placed 3rd at the Asian Figure Skating Trophy, and went on to place 17th and 10th at his Junior Grand Prix assignments in Austria and Croatia for the 2017/18 season. He placed 7th at the 2018 South Korean Figure Skating Championships and was named an alternate to, and was eventually called up to compete at the 2018 Four Continents Figure Skating Championships, where he finished 20th.

== Programs ==
| Season | Short program | Free skating |
|---|---|---|
| 2017–2018 | Spider-Man sung by Michael Bublé | Pirates of the Caribbean by Hans Zimmer |
| 2016–2017 | Sherlock Holmes by Hans Zimmer | Love Me Tender; Hound Dog sung by Elvis Presley |
| 2014–2016 | Feeling Good by Michael Bublé | Don Quixote by Ludwig Minkus |
| 2013–2014 | Csárdás performed by David Morris | The Untouchables by Ennio Morricone |
| 2012–2013 | Kung Fu Panda by Hans Zimmer | Praeludium und Allegro by Tasmin Little |
| 2011–2012 | Up by Michael Giacchino | Praeludium und Allegro by Tasmin Little |
| 2010–2011 | | Up by Michael Giacchino |

== Competitive highlights ==
JGP = Junior Grand Prix

International
| Event | 11–12 | 12–13 | 13–14 | 14–15 | 15–16 | 16–17 | 17–18 | 18–19 |
|---|---|---|---|---|---|---|---|---|
| Four Continents | | | | | | | 20th | |
| Asian Trophy | | | | | | | 3rd | |
| NRW Trophy | | | | | | 13th | | |
International: Junior, novice
| JGP Lithuania | | | | | | | | 5th |
| JGP Croatia | | | | | | | 10th | |
| JGP Slovakia | | | | | 11th | | | |
| JGP Austria | | | | | 12th | | 17th | |
| Asian Trophy | | 3rd N | | | | | | |
National
| South Korean | 1st N | 1st N | 3rd J | 7th | 6th | 6th | 7th | |
Levels: N = Novice; J = Junior

== Detailed results ==
=== Junior level ===
2018–2019 season
| Date | Event | Level | SP | FS | Total |
|---|---|---|---|---|---|
| September 5–8, 2018 | 2018 JGP Lithuania | Junior | 6; **61.61** | 5; 116.95 | 5; 178.56 |
2017–2018 season
| Date | Event | Level | SP | FS | Total |
| January 22–28, 2018 | 2018 Four Continents Championships | Senior | 23; 56.67 | 18; **123.59** | 20; **180.26** |
| January 5–7, 2018 | 2018 South Korean Championships | Senior | 9; 58.04 | 5; 128.96 | 7; 184.00 |
| September 27–30, 2017 | 2017 JGP Croatia | Junior | 9; 58.36 | 11; 105.97 | 10; 164.33 |
| August 30 – September 2, 2017 | 2017 JGP Austria | Junior | 17; 44.30 | 14; 102.56 | 17; 146.86 |
| August 2–5, 2017 | 2017 Asian Open Trophy | Senior | 4; 57.72 | 3; 125.84 | 3; 183.56 |
2016–2017 season
| Date | Event | Level | SP | FS | Total |
| January 7–9, 2017 | 2017 South Korean Championships | Senior | 7; 50.30 | 5; 116.91 | 6; 167.21 |
| November 30 – December 4, 2016 | 2016 NRW Trophy | Senior | 14; 45.47 | 13; 94.27 | 13; 139.74 |
2015–2016 season
| Date | Event | Level | SP | FS | Total |
| January 8–10, 2016 | 2016 South Korean Championships | Senior | 8; 43.41 | 6; 111.09 | 6; 154.50 |
| September 9–13, 2015 | 2015 JGP Austria | Junior | 12; 49.89 | 12; 100.15 | 12; 150.04 |
| August 19–23, 2015 | 2015 JGP Slovakia | Junior | 14; 45.96 | 10; 96.96 | 11; 142.92 |
2014–2015 season
| Date | Event | Level | SP | FS | Total |
| January 7–9, 2015 | 2015 South Korean Championships | Senior | 7; 42.55 | 7; 98.93 | 7; 141.48 |
2013–2014 season
| Date | Event | Level | SP | FS | Total |
| January 3–5, 2014 | 2014 South Korean Championships | Junior | 1; 43.25 | 3; 82.99 | 3; 126.24 |
2012–2013 season
| Date | Event | Level | SP | FS | Total |
| January 2–6, 2013 | 2013 South Korean Championships | Novice | 3; 26.03 | 1; 51.89 | 1; 77.92 |
| August 7–12, 2012 | 2012 Asian Open Trophy | Novice | - | 3; 28.38 | 3; 28.38 |
2011–2012 season
| Date | Event | Level | SP | FS | Total |
| January 4–8, 2012 | 2012 South Korean Championships | Novice | 3; 27.55 | 1; 47.00 | 1; 74.55 |

- Personal best highlighted in **bold**.
