= Shin Yea-ji (figure skater, born 1988) =

South Korean figure skater (born 1988)

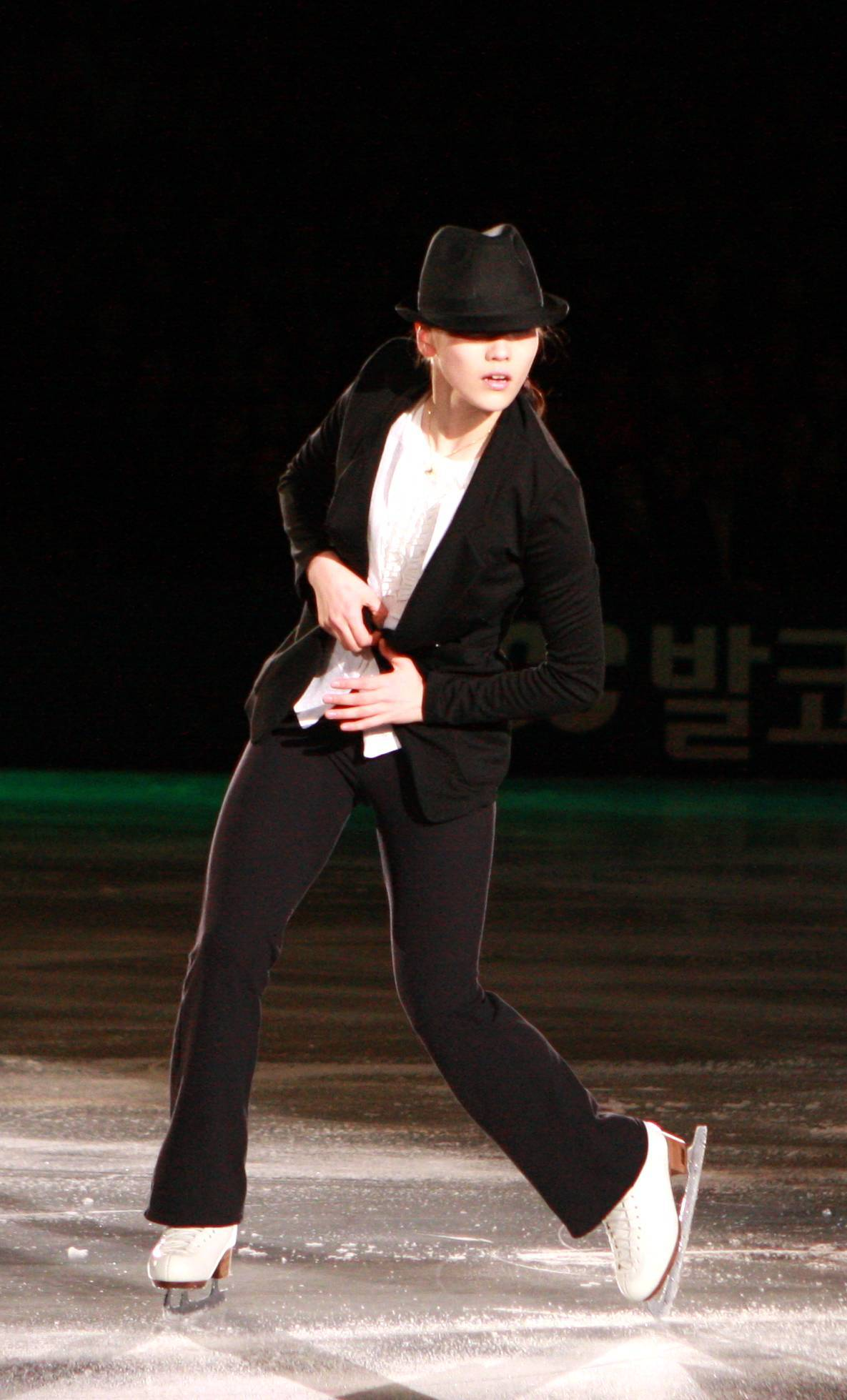
- Shin at the 2009 Festa On Ice

Personal information
- Native name: 신예지
- Born: February 25, 1988 (age 38)
- Height: 167 cm (5 ft 6 in)

Figure skating career
- Country: South Korea
- Coach: Chi Hyun-jung; Frank Carroll
- Skating club: Mokdong Skating Club
- Retired: November 8, 2009

- Shin Yea-ji
- Hangul: 신예지
- RR: Sin Yeji
- MR: Sin Yeji

Shin Yea-ji (Korean: 신예지; born February 25, 1988, in Seoul) is a South Korean figure skating coach and choreographer and former competitive figure skater. She is the 2007 South Korean national silver medalist. She competed for two seasons on the Junior Grand Prix circuit, and placed fourth at the 2007 Winter Universiade. Her highest placement at an ISU Championship was 8th at the 2007 World Junior Championships.

== Work as a choreographer ==
Following Shin's retirement from competitive figure skating in 2009, she began her career as a choreographer.

She has choreographed for:

- An Xiangyi
- Olivia Bacsa
- Cha Jun-hwan
- Cha Young-hyun
- Cho Hee-soo
- Choi Ha-bin
- Elisabeth Dibbern
- Han Hee-sue
- Hwang Jeon-gyul
- Jeon Su-been
- Ji Seo-yeon
- Joo Hye-won
- Yuma Kagiyama
- Livia Kaiser
- Mana Kawabe
- Kim Chae-yeon
- Kim Hae-jin
- Kim Ha-nul
- Kim Han-gil
- Kim Hyun-gyeom
- Kim Jin-seo
- Kim Mi-song
- Kim Na-hyun
- Kim Yu-jae
- Kim Yu-seong
- Ko Na-yeon
- Kwak Min-jeong
- Kwon Min-sol
- Kyeong Jae-Seok
- Lee Hae-in
- Lee Hyo-rin
- Lee Hyo-won
- Lee Jae-keun
- Lee June-hyoung
- Lee Si-hyeong
- Li Yu-Hsiang
- Lim Eun-soo
- Lim Ju-heon
- Moon Bo-in
- Ami Nakai
- Rio Nakata
- Seo Min-kyu
- Shin Ji-a
- Song Si-woo
- Noelle Streuli
- Yo Takagi
- Wi Seo-yeong
- Youn Seo-jin
- Yu Dong-han
- Yu Na-yeong
- Yun Ah-sun

== Programs ==
Season	Short program	Free skating
2006–07	House of Flying Daggers by Shigeru Umebayashi	O (Cirque du Soleil) by Benoît Jutras
2005–06	Ritual Fire Dance by Manuel de Falla	La Valse by Maurice Ravel
2004–05	Ave Maria by Charles Gounod	The Firebird by Igor Stravinsky
2003–04	Anna and the King by George Fenton	The Hours by Philip Glass

== Competitive highlights ==
JGP: Junior Grand Prix

International
Event	02–03	03–04	04–05	05–06	06–07	07–08	08–09
Four Continents			17th	17th	11th		
Asian Games					8th		
Universiade					4th		
International: Junior
Junior Worlds		30th		14th	8th		
JGP Croatia				11th			
JGP Czech Republic					7th		
JGP Mexico					3rd		
JGP Slovakia				20th			
Triglav Trophy	7th J.						
National
South Korean Champ.		1st J.	1st J.	3rd	2nd	5th	6th
J. = Junior level

== Education ==
- Seoul Women's University
- Seoul Gwangmun High School
