= Choi Yu-jin (figure skater) =

South Korean figure skater

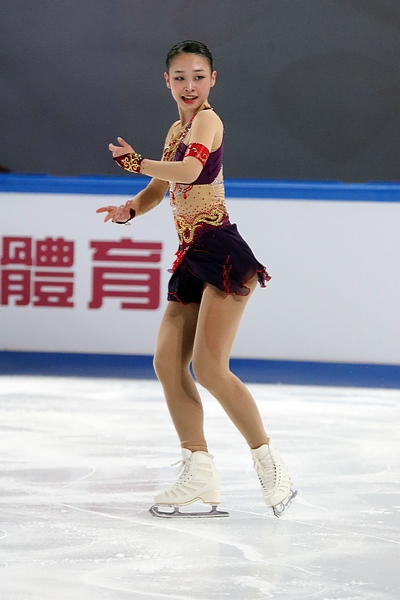

Personal information
- Native name: 최유진
- Born: 11 August 2000 (age 26) Gyeonggi Province, South Korea
- Home town: Gyeonggi-do
- Height: 1.57 m (5 ft 2 in)

Figure skating career
- Country: South Korea
- Coach: Lee Eun-hee

Choi Yu-jin (Korean: 최유진; born August 12, 2000) is a South Korean figure skater. She is the 2016 Merano Cup silver medalist.

== Career ==
Choi placed 8th with a score of 136.47 in a Korean domestic competition to select skaters for the ISU Junior Grand Prix (JGP). She made her JGP debut in Riga, Latvia, placing 8th with a total score of 141.33 points. In November 2015, she won the junior gold medal at the Golden Bear of Zagreb in Croatia.

Choi's first senior international medal, silver, came in November 2016 at the Merano Cup in Italy.

== Programs ==
Season	Short program	Free skating
2019–2020	Oblivion by Astor Piazzolla	Scheherazade by Nikolai Rimsky-Korsakov
2018–2019	Nagada Sang Dhol from Goliyon Ki Raasleela Ram-Leela by Sanjay Leela Bhansali and Hemu Gadhavi	Tosca by Giacomo Puccini
2017–2018	Carmen Fantasie performed by David Garrett; Habanera (from Carmen) by Georges Bizet	Samson and Delilah by Camille Saint-Saëns; Bacchanale; S'Apre Per Te Il Mio Cuore performed by Filippa Giordano
2016–2017	Fever by Peggy Lee; What Is This Thing Called Love? by Keely Smith	Porgy and Bess by George Gershwin
2015–2016	El Choclo by Ángel Villoldo	West Side Story by Leonard Bernstein
2014–2015	Moonlight Sonata by Ludwig van Beethoven	The Umbrellas of Cherbourg by Michel Legrand performed by Acoustic Café
2013–2014	Tosca Fantasy by Edvin Marton	Csárdás performed by Maxim Vengerov
2012–2013	Duel by Bond	Pirates of the Caribbean by Hans Zimmer
2011–12		Pirates of the Caribbean by Hans Zimmer

== Competitive highlights ==
CS: Challenger Series; JGP: Junior Grand Prix

International
Event	13–14	14–15	15–16	16–17	17–18	18–19	19–20
GP Cup of China							12th
CS Finlandia					10th	7th	
CS Ondrej Nepela						6th	
CS Tallinn Trophy				11th			
Merano Cup				2nd			
International: Junior
JGP Latvia			8th				
Golden Bear			1st				
National
South Korea	2nd J	35th		16th	8th		11th
J = Junior level TBD = Assigned; WD = Withdrew

== Detailed results ==
2019–20 season
Date	Event	Level	SP	FS	Total
November 8–10, 2019	2019 Cup of China	Senior	12; 48.75	12; 82.73	12; 131.48
2018–19 season
Date	Event	Level	SP	FS	Total
October 4–7, 2018	2018 CS Finlandia Trophy	Senior	11; 50.62	7; 112.18	7; 162.80
19–22 September 2018	2018 CS Ondrej Nepela Trophy	Senior	6; 54.20	6; 95.94	6; 150.14
2016–17 season
Date	Event	Level	SP	FS	Total
January 6–8, 2017	2017 South Korean Championships	Senior	13; 50.58	17; 92.45	16; 143.03
November 9–13, 2016	2016 Merano Cup	Senior	2; 50.00	2; 93.41	2; 143.41
2015–16 season
Date	Event	Level	SP	FS	Total
November 19–22, 2015	2015 Golden Bear of Zagreb	Junior	2; 46.98	1; 81.43	1; 128.41
August 26–30, 2015	2015 ISU Junior Grand Prix, Latvia	Junior	10; 45.20	7; 96.13	8; 141.33
2014–15 season
Date	Event	Level	SP	FS	Total
January 7–9, 2015	2015 South Korean Championships	Senior	35; 31.19	-	-
2013–14 season
Date	Event	Level	SP	FS	Total
January 3–5, 2014	2014 South Korean Championships	Junior	3; 46.86	2; 88.91	2; 135.77
