= Karen Kwan (figure skater) =

American figure skater

Personal information
- Born: June 1, 1978 (age 48) Torrance, California, USA

Figure skating career
- Country: United States
- Retired: 1997

Karen Wingyan Kwan (born 1 June 1978) is an American retired figure skater and choreographer. She is the older sister of Michelle Kwan.

== Early life and skating career ==
Karen Kwan was born in Torrance, California to immigrant parents from Hong Kong.

The Kwan sisters began figure skating at the same time and trained and competed against each other for years. Karen, like Michelle, was coached by Frank Carroll at the Lake Arrowhead training center. Though Karen's results never quite matched Michelle's, she was known for her long legs and arms that added a lyrical style and an elegant dimension to her skating. She also had consistent triple jumps and good technical spins. Karen also represented the United States at numerous international skating events, and won the bronze medal at the 1996 Nebelhorn Trophy in Germany. At 5 feet 8 inches (1.73 m) tall, Karen stands about 1/2-foot (15 cm) taller than Michelle. She retired in 1997 to focus on school. She attended Boston University.

== Post skating career ==
Since ending her competitive skating career, Kwan has maintained her connection to the sport. She works as a choreographer and is the skating director at the East West Skating Palace, in Artesia, California. The Kwan family owns and operates the rink.

Kwan graduated from Boston University in 2000 with a bachelor's degree in communications. She worked with clothing designer Vera Wang, who is noted for designing figure skating costumes for Olympians Nancy Kerrigan, Michelle Kwan, Evan Lysacek and Nathan Chen.

== Personal life ==
Kwan was married to 1988 Olympic bronze medallist Peter Oppegard. They have two daughters.

As of 2017, they were estranged. They divorced in 2022.

== Results ==
International
Event	1994–95	1995–96	1996–97
Nebelhorn Trophy			3rd
Trophée Lalique			7th
National
U.S. Championships	7th	5th	7th
Pacific Coast Sect.		1st	4th
