= 2016–17 national figure skating championships =

- Type: National
- Season: 2016–17
- Previous: 2015–16
- Next: 2017–18

National figure skating championships of the 2016–17 season are taking place mostly between November 2016 and February 2017. Medals may be awarded in the disciplines of men's singles, ladies' singles, pair skating, and ice dancing.

== Competitions ==
Key

Nationals	Other domestic

Date	Event	Type	Level	Disc.	Location	Refs
2016
6–8 October	Master's de Patinage	Other	Sen.-Jun.	All	Villard-de-Lans, France	
11–14 October	New Zealand Championships	Nat.	Sen.-Nov.	M/L/D	Christchurch, New Zealand	
21–23 October	Japan Novice Championships	Nat.	Novice		Hyōgo, Japan	
17–19 November	Belgian Championships	Nat.	Sen.–Nov.	M/L	Lommel, Belgium	
18–20 November	Japan Junior Championships	Nat.	Junior	M/L/D	Hokkaido, Japan	
23–24 November	Philippine Championships	Nat.	Sen.-Nov.	All	Manila, Philippines	
25 Nov – 2 Dec	Australian Championships	Nat.	Sen.-Nov.	All	Melbourne, Australia	
29 Nov – 4 Dec	British Championships	Nat.	Sen.-Nov.	All	Sheffield, United Kingdom	
30 Nov – 4 Dec	Skate Canada Challenge	Other	Sen.-Nov.	All	Pierrefonds, Canada	
2–4 December	Danish Championships	Nat.	Sen.-Nov.	M/L/D	Vojens, Denmark	
3–4 December	Latvian / Lithuanian Champ.	Nat.	Sen.-Nov.	M/L	Ventspils, Latvia	
9–11 December	Estonian Championships	Nat.	Senior	M/L/D	Tallinn, Estonia	
13–14 December	Serbian Championships	Nat.	Sen.–Nov.	L	Belgrade, Serbia	
14–17 December	Italian Championships	Nat.	Sen.–Jun.	All	Egna, Italy	
15–17 December	Austrian Championships	Nat.	Sen.–Nov.	All	Graz, Austria	
15–17 December	French Championships	Nat.	Senior	All	Caen, France	
15–18 December	Swedish Championships	Nat.	Sen.–Nov.	M/L/P	Malmö, Sweden	
16–17 December	Swiss Championships	Nat.	Senior	All	Lucerne, Switzerland	
16–17 December	Four Nationals Championships (Czech, Slovak, Polish, Hungarian)	Nat.	Sen.–Jun.	All	Katowice, Poland	
16–17 December	German Championships	Nat.	Senior	All	Berlin, Germany	
16–18 December	Spanish Championships	Nat.	Sen.–Nov.	All	Vielha, Spain	
17–18 December	Belarusian Championships	Nat.	Senior	All	Minsk, Belarus	
17–18 December	Finnish Championships	Nat.	Sen.–Jun.	All	Tampere, Finland	
17–18 December	Slovenian Championships	Nat.	Sen.–Nov.	M/L	Jesenice, Slovenia	
21–23 December	Ukrainian Championships	Nat.	Senior	All	Kyiv, Ukraine	
22–24 December	Russian Championships	Nat.	Senior	All	Chelyabinsk, Russia	
22–25 December	Japan Championships	Nat.	Senior	All	Osaka, Japan	
23–25 December	Turkish Championships	Nat.	Sen.–Nov.	M/L	İzmir, Turkey	
24–25 December	Chinese Championships	Nat.	Senior	All	Jilin, China	
2017
6–8 January	South Korean Championships	Nat.	Sen.-Jun.	All	Gangneung, South Korea	
11–15 January	German Youth Championships	Nat.		All	Mannheim, Germany	
13–15 January	Norwegian Championships	Nat.	Sen.-Nov.	L	Hamar, Norway	
14–15 January	Croatian Championships	Nat.	Sen.-Nov.	M/L	Zagreb, Croatia	
14–22 January	U.S. Championships	Nat.	Sen.-Nov.	All	Kansas City, United States	
16–22 January	Canadian Championships	Nat.	Sen.-Nov.	All	Ottawa, Canada	
1–5 February	Russian Junior Championships	Nat.	Junior	All	Saint Petersburg, Russia	
24–26 February	French Junior Championships	Nat.	Junior		Cergy, France	
Levels: Sen. = Senior; Jun. = Junior; Nov. = Novice; Disciplines: M = Men's singles; L = Ladies' singles; P = Pair skating; D = Ice dancing; All = All four disciplines

== Medalists ==
=== Men ===
Men
Nation	Gold	Silver	Bronze	Refs
Australia	Brendan Kerry	James Min	Andrew Dodds	
Austria	Mario-Rafael Ionian	Manuel Koll	Johannes Maierhofer	
Belarus	Anton Karpuk	Aliaksei Mialiokhin	Yauhenii Puzanau	
Belgium	Jorik Hendrickx	—N/a		
Bulgaria	Niki-Leo Obreikov	Ivo Gatovski	—N/a	
Canada	Patrick Chan	Kevin Reynolds	Nam Nguyen	
China	Jin Boyang	Guan Yuhang	Li Tangxu	
Czech Republic	Jiří Bělohradský	Matyáš Bělohradský	Tomáš Kupka	
Estonia	Daniel-Albert Naurits	Daniil Zurav	Samuel Koppel	
France	Kévin Aymoz	Chafik Besseghier	Romain Ponsart	
Finland	Valtter Virtanen	—N/a		
Germany	Peter Liebers	Paul Fentz	Franz Streubel	
Hungary	Alexander Borovoj	András Csernoch	—N/a	
Italy	Ivan Righini	Matteo Rizzo	Maurizio Zandron	
Japan	Shoma Uno	Keiji Tanaka	Takahito Mura	
Latvia	Deniss Vasiļjevs	Gļebs Basins	—N/a	
Philippines	Michael Christian Martinez	—N/a		
Poland	Krzysztof Gała	Ihor Reznichenko	Ryszard Gurtler	
Russia	Mikhail Kolyada	Alexander Samarin	Maxim Kovtun	
Slovakia	Jakub Kršňák	Michael Neuman	Marco Klepoch	
South Korea	Cha Jun-hwan	Kim Jin-seo	Lee Si-hyeong	
Spain	Javier Fernández	Javier Raya	Felipe Montoya	
Sweden	Alexander Majorov	Ondrej Spiegl	Marcus Björk	
Switzerland	Stéphane Walker	Lukas Britschgi	Nurullah Sahaka	
Turkey	Engin Ali Artan	Burak Demirboga	Mehmet Cakir	
Ukraine	Ivan Pavlov	Yaroslav Paniot	Ivan Shmuratko	
United Kingdom	Graham Newberry	Peter James Hallam	Phillip Harris	
United States	Nathan Chen	Vincent Zhou	Jason Brown	

=== Ladies ===
Ladies
Nation	Gold	Silver	Bronze	Refs
Australia	Kailani Craine	Brooklee Han	Katie Pasfield	
Austria	Kerstin Frank	Alisa Stomakhina	Marika Steward	
Belarus	Hanna Paroshina	Lizaveta Malinouskaya	Janina Makeenka	
Belgium	Loena Hendrickx	Charlotte Vandersarren	—N/a	
Bulgaria	Alexandra Feigin	Teodora Markova	Monika Yordanova	
Canada	Kaetlyn Osmond	Gabrielle Daleman	Alaine Chartrand	
Croatia	Tena Čopor	Mihaela Štimac Rojtinić	Claudia Krizmanić	
Czech Republic	Michaela Lucie Hanzlíková	Eliška Březinová	Natálie Kratěnová	
Denmark	Emma Frida Andersen	Emma Louise Jensen	Malene Andersen	
Estonia	Helery Hälvin	Gerli Liinamäe	Annely Vahi	
Finland	Emmi Peltonen	Jenni Saarinen	Viveca Lindfors	
France	Laurine Lecavelier	Maé-Bérénice Méité	Alizée Crozet	
Germany	Nathalie Weinzierl	Lea Johanna Dastich	Annika Hocke	
Hungary	Ivett Tóth	Júlia Bátori	Eszter Szombathelyi	
Italy	Carolina Kostner	Roberta Rodeghiero	Giada Russo	
Japan	Satoko Miyahara	Wakaba Higuchi	Mai Mihara	
Latvia	Angelīna Kučvaļska	—N/a		
Lithuania	Elžbieta Kropa	Deimantė Kizalaitė	Inga Janulevičiūtė	
New Zealand	Allie Rout	Preeya Laud	Sarah MacGibbon	
Norway	Jemima Rasmuss	Juni Marie Benjaminsen	Ingrid Katrina Bakke	
Philippines	Alisson Perticheto	Samantha Cabiles	—N/a	
Poland	Elżbieta Gabryszak	Agnieszka Rejment	Coco Colette Kaminski	
Russia	Evgenia Medvedeva	Alina Zagitova	Maria Sotskova	
Slovakia	Nicole Rajičová	Bronislava Dobiášová	Alexandra Hagarová	
Slovenia	Daša Grm	Urša Krušec	—N/a	
South Korea	Lim Eun-soo	Kim Ye-lim	Kim Na-hyun	
Spain	Valentina Matos	Sonia Lafuente	—N/a	
Sweden	Joshi Helgesson	Matilda Algotsson	Anita Östlund	
Switzerland	Yasmine Yamada	Yoonmi Lehmann	Jérômie Repond	
Turkey	Birce Atabey	Sıla Saygı	Sinem Kuyucu	
Ukraine	Anna Khnychenkova	Anastasia Hozhva	Daria Hozhva	
United Kingdom	Natasha McKay	Karly Robertson	Danielle Harrison	
United States	Karen Chen	Ashley Wagner	Mariah Bell	

=== Pairs ===
Pairs
Nation	Gold	Silver	Bronze	Refs
Australia	Ekaterina Alexandrovskaya / Harley Windsor	Paris Stephens / Matthew Dodds	—N/a	
Belarus	Tatiana Danilova / Mikalai Kamianchuk	—N/a		
Canada	Meagan Duhamel / Eric Radford	Lubov Ilyushechkina / Dylan Moscovitch	Kirsten Moore-Towers / Michael Marinaro	
China				
Finland	Emilia Simonen / Matthew Penasse	—N/a		
France	Vanessa James / Morgan Ciprès	Lola Esbrat / Andrei Novoselov	Camille Mendoza / Pavel Kovalev	
Germany	Mari Vartmann / Ruben Blommaert	—N/a		
Italy	Nicole Della Monica / Matteo Guarise	Valentina Marchei / Ondřej Hotárek	Rebecca Ghilardi / Filippo Ambrosini	
Japan	Sumire Suto / Francis Boudreau-Audet	Miu Suzaki / Ryuichi Kihara	Marin Ono / Wesley Killing	
Russia	Ksenia Stolbova / Fedor Klimov	Evgenia Tarasova / Vladimir Morozov	Natalia Zabiiako / Alexander Enbert	
South Korea	Ji Min-ji / Themistocles Leftheris	Kim Su-yeon / Kim Hyung-tae	Kim Kyu-eun / Alex Kang-chan Kam	
Switzerland	Ioulia Chtchetinina / Noah Scherer	Alexandra Herbríková / Nicolas Roulet	—N/a	
Ukraine	Renata Ohanesian / Mark Bardei	—N/a		
United Kingdom	Zoe Wilkinson / Christopher Boyadji	—N/a		
United States	Haven Denney / Brandon Frazier	Marissa Castelli / Mervin Tran	Ashley Cain / Timothy LeDuc	

=== Ice dancing ===
Ice dancing
Nation	Gold	Silver	Bronze	Refs
Australia	Matilda Friend / Will Badaoui	Adele Morrison / Demid Rokachev	Kimberley Hew-Low / Timothy McKernan	
Austria	Regina Yankovska / Dmytro Matsyuk	—N/a		
Belarus	Viktoria Kavaliova / Yurii Bieliaiev	Kristsina Kaunatskaia / Yuri Hulitski	Adelina Zvezdova / Uladzimir Zaitsau	
Canada	Tessa Virtue / Scott Moir	Kaitlyn Weaver / Andrew Poje	Piper Gilles / Paul Poirier	
China				
Czech Republic	Cortney Mansour / Michal Češka	Nicole Kuzmich / Alexandr Sinicyn	—N/a	
Estonia	Katerina Bunina / German Frolov	Marina Elias / Geido Kapp	—N/a	
Finland	Cecilia Törn / Jussiville Partanen	Juulia Turkkila / Matthias Versluis	—N/a	
France	Gabriella Papadakis / Guillaume Cizeron	Marie-Jade Lauriault / Romain Le Gac	Lorenza Alessandrini / Pierre Souquet	
Germany	Kavita Lorenz / Joti Polizoakis	Katharina Müller / Tim Dieck	Shari Koch / Christian Nüchtern	
Italy	Anna Cappellini / Luca Lanotte	Charlène Guignard / Marco Fabbri	Jasmine Tessari / Francesco Fioretti	
Japan	Kana Muramoto / Chris Reed	Emi Hirai / Marien de la Asuncion	Misato Komatsubara / Tim Koleto	
Poland	Natalia Kaliszek / Maksym Spodyriev	—N/a		
Russia	Ekaterina Bobrova / Dmitri Soloviev	Alexandra Stepanova / Ivan Bukin	Victoria Sinitsina / Nikita Katsalapov	
Slovakia	Lucie Myslivečková / Lukáš Csölley	—N/a		
South Korea	Yura Min / Alexander Gamelin	Lee Ho-jung / Richard Kang-in Kam	—N/a	
Spain	Sara Hurtado / Kirill Khaliavin	Olivia Smart / Adrià Díaz	Celia Robledo / Luis Fenero	
Switzerland	Victoria Manni / Carlo Röthlisberger	Bailey Melton / Darian Weiss	—N/a	
Ukraine	Oleksandra Nazarova / Maxim Nikitin	Darya Popova / Volodymyr Byelikov	Yuliia Zhata / Yan Lukouski	
United Kingdom	Lilah Fear / Lewis Gibson	Robynne Tweedale / Joseph Buckland	Ekaterina Fedyushchenko / Lucas Kitteridge	
United States	Maia Shibutani / Alex Shibutani	Madison Chock / Evan Bates	Madison Hubbell / Zachary Donohue	
