= Choi Da-bin =

South Korean figure skater (born 2000)

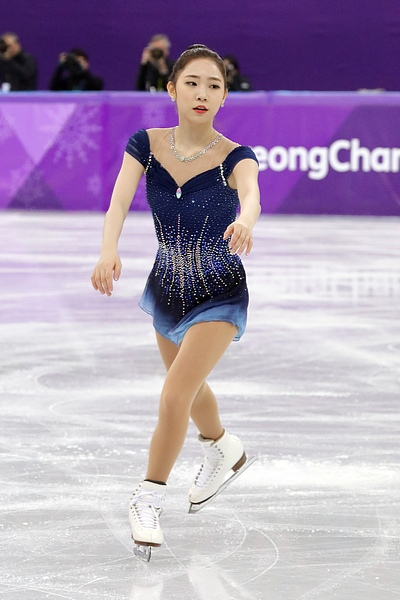
- Choi at the 2018 Winter Olympics

Personal information
- Native name: 최다빈
- Born: January 19, 2000 (age 26) Seoul, South Korea
- Home town: Namyangju-si, Gyeonggi Province, South Korea
- Height: 1.58 m (5 ft 2 in)

Figure skating career
- Country: South Korea
- Coach: Shin Hea-sook
- Began skating: 2004
- Retired: January 22, 2025
Medal record
Figure skating: Ladies' singles
South Korean Championships
Silver medal – second place	2015 Seoul	Ladies' Singles
Silver medal – second place	2016 Seoul	Ladies' Singles
Silver medal – second place	2018 Seoul	Ladies' Singles
Bronze medal – third place	2012 Seoul	Ladies' Singles
Bronze medal – third place	2013 Seoul	Ladies' Singles

- Choi Da-bin
- Hangul: 최다빈
- Hanja: 崔 多彬
- RR: Choe Dabin
- MR: Ch'oe Tabin

Choi Da-bin (Korean: 최다빈; born January 19, 2000) is a retired South Korean competitive figure skater. She is the 2017 Asian Winter Games champion, two-time ISU Challenger Series medalist, and a 5-time South Korean national medalist (three silver, two bronze). She has placed in the top ten at the 2018 Winter Olympics, the 2017 World Championships, and the Four Continents Championships (2016, 2017, 2018).

Earlier in her career, she won two bronze medals during the 2015–16 ISU Junior Grand Prix series in Austria and Latvia. She placed in the top ten at the World Junior Championships (2014, 2015).

== Personal life ==
Choi was born on January 19, 2000, in Seoul. She attended Suri High School as a student, same as fellow skater Kim Yuna .

Choi's mother died on June 26, 2017, from cancer. Choi has said that her mother was her biggest supporter and fan. Her 2017–18 season short program 'Papa Can You Hear Me?' was dedicated to her.

She currently studies Sports Psychology at Korea University Graduate School.

== Career ==
=== Early years ===
As a nine-year-old, Choi won the novice silver medal at the 2010 South Korean Nationals. Competing on the senior level, she won bronze medals at the 2012 and 2013 Nationals.

=== 2013–2014 season: Junior international debut ===
In the 2013–14 season, Choi debuted on the ISU Junior Grand Prix series, finishing fourth and fifth at her two events. At the 2014 World Junior Championships in Sofia, Bulgaria, she placed ninth in the short program, sixth in the free skate, and sixth overall, setting a new personal best score of 162.35 points.

=== 2014–2015 season ===
In the 2014–15 season, Choi finished fourth and fifth at her JGP events in France and Japan. At the 2015 South Korean Nationals, she placed second in both programs to win silver behind Park So-youn. At the 2015 World Junior Championships, she placed ninth in both programs and ninth overall, thus securing two spots for her country at the 2016 edition.

=== 2015–2016 season: Two JGP medals and senior international debut ===
In the 2015–16 season, Choi won her first JGP medals, taking bronze in Riga, Latvia, and Linz, Austria. Making her senior international debut, Choi finished eighth at the 2015 CS Tallinn Trophy. At the 2015 KSU President Cup Ranking Competition, she won her first gold medal at a national competition. At the 2016 Four Continents Championships in Taipei, Taiwan, she placed 8th with personal bests in the free skate and total scores.

=== 2016–2017 season: Winter Asian Games champion ===
Making her senior Grand Prix debut, Choi placed 7th at the 2016 Skate Canada International and 8th at the 2016 NHK Trophy. She placed fourth at the 2017 South Korean Championships. She changed her short program music from Qué rico el mambo into Steven Universe and La La Land in the middle of the season. She also changed coaches, deciding to join Lee Eun-hee. She placed fifth at the 2017 Four Continents Championships in Gangneung, South Korea, improving her personal best scores in all categories.

Called up to replace the injured Park So-youn at the 2017 Asian Winter Games in Sapporo, Japan, Choi won her country's first-ever figure skating gold medal at the event. South Korea also selected Choi to replace the injured Kim Na-hyun at the 2017 World Championships in Helsinki, Finland. She would place tenth in Finland, allowing her country to send two ladies' single skaters to the 2018 Winter Olympics in Pyeongchang and 2018 World Championships in Milan.

=== 2017–2018 season: 2018 Winter Olympics ===
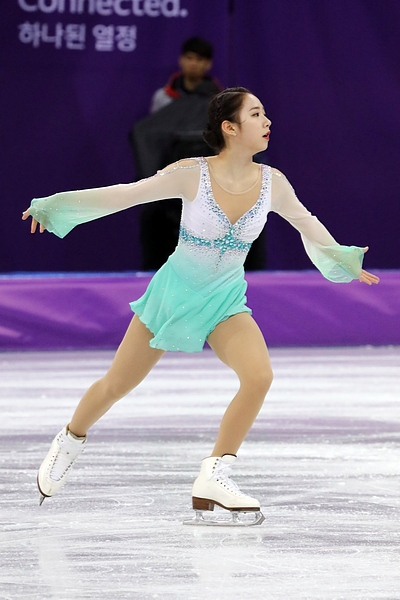
Choi at the 2018 Winter Olympics.

Choi began the season competing at the 2017 CS Ondrej Nepela Trophy, placing fourth. At the first of her two assignments on the 2017-18 Grand Prix circuit, the 2017 Cup of China, she placed a disappointing ninth, hampered by a foot injury. She subsequently withdrew from her second Grand Prix event at the 2017 Skate America as a result of the injury.

Choi and Kim Ha-nul were selected to compete at both the 2018 Winter Olympics in PyeongChang, South Korea, and the 2018 World Figure Skating Championships in Milan, Italy. They were joined by Park So-youn for the 2018 Four Continents Figure Skating Championships in Taipei, Taiwan.

At the Four Continents Championships, Choi missed the podium, coming in fourth just behind Japan's Satoko Miyahara. Choi reverted to her Doctor Zhivago free skate program for this and all subsequent competitions for the season, citing the difficulty in performing its replacement to the standard she desired.

Choi received a standing ovation for her short program at the Olympics, including from South Korea's Yuna Kim. She set personal bests in both the short program and free skate and finished seventh overall. Her short program for the season, set to "Papa, Can You Hear Me?" was dedicated to her mother, who had died shortly before the South Korean qualifying event. Choi commented following her performance in the team event: "I am very thankful to my mother, who is watching me from Heaven."

After skating the short program at the 2018 World Championships, Choi was compelled to withdraw due to equipment failure.

Following the season, Choi made a coaching change from Lee Eun-hee to Shin Hea-sook.

=== 2018–2019 season ===
Although assigned to compete at 2018 Ondrej Nepela Trophy, 2018 Skate Canada, and 2018 NHK Trophy, Choi withdrew from all three events due to continued boot problems. She didn't compete for the rest of the 2018–19 figure skating season.

During the off-season, Choi participated in the 2019 All That Skate show.

=== 2019–2020 season ===
Returning to international competition, Choi began the 2019–20 figure skating season with a seventh-place finish at 2019 CS Nebelhorn Trophy. She then went on to finish fourth at the 2019 Denis Ten Memorial Challenge and twelfth at 2019 CS Warsaw Cup. Choi did not compete at the 2020 Korean Championships.

=== 2021–2022 season ===
Despite not competing for the first half of the 2021–22 figure skating season, Choi was assigned to compete at 2021 Winter Universiade, however, the event was cancelled due to the COVID-19 pandemic. Choi announced during a guest appearance on South Korean TV show, Sporty Sisters 2, that she would likely retire from competitive figure skating following the season, citing her struggles with boot problems and ankle injuries as the main reason behind the decision.

=== 2022–2023 season: Return to competition ===
Despite Choi's previous intention to retire from competitive figure skating, she decided to return to competition for the 2022–23 figure skating season, stating that her goal was to compete at 2023 Winter World University Games.

Choi began her season with a bronze medal and eighteenth-place finish at the 2022 CS Denis Ten Memorial Challenge and 2022 CS Ice Challenge, respectively. She went on to finish fourteenth at the 2023 Korean Championships, after placing twelfth in the short program but fourteenth in the free skate.

Choi was selected to compete at the Winter World University Games, where she placed sixth in both the short and free program, finishing in sixth place overall.

=== 2023–2024 season ===
Appearing on the Challenger circuit, Choi finished fifth at the 2023 CS Autumn Classic International. She then went on to win silver at the 2023 CS Denis Ten Memorial Challenge.

Choi went on to finish fifteenth at the national ranking competition and thirteenth at the 2024 South Korean Championships.

=== 2024–2025 season ===
Choi began the season in early October when she competed at the 2024 Korean Universiade and Asian Games Qualifiers. She would finish fourth at the event and was ultimately selected to represent South Korea at the 2025 Winter World University Games. In late November, she competed at the South Korean Ranking Competition, where she would finish in fourteenth-place.

At the 2025 Winter World University Games, Choi finished in eleventh place. Following the event, she announced her retirement from competitive figure skating.

In late February, Choi, alongside fellow retired figure skaters, Lim Eun-soo and Wi Seoyeong, were invited to perform together during the Gala at the 2025 Four Continents Championships, which were held in Seoul.

== Programs ==
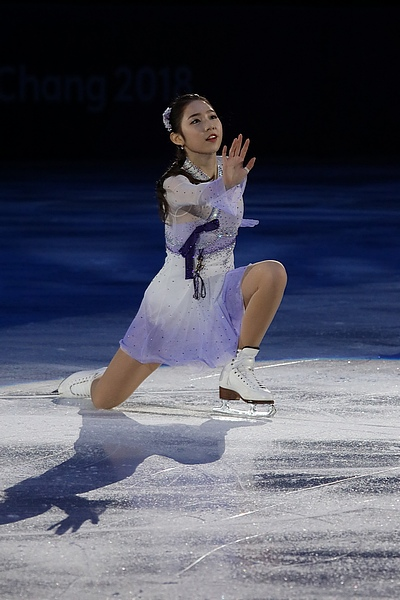
Choi performing her gala program "Jeongseon Arirang Rapsody" at the 2018 Winter Olympics.

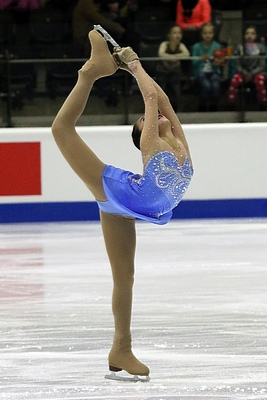
Choi performing a Biellmann spin during her free skate "Andante spianato" at the 2015 World Junior Figure Skating Championships.

Season	Short program	Free skating	Exhibition
2024–2025	My Way by Jacques Revaux	Lend Me Your Voice (from Belle) performed by Kylie McNeill; East of Eden by Lee Holdridge; Legends of the Fall by James Horner choreo. by Kenji Miyamoto	
2023–2024	Schindler's List by John Williams choreo. by Kenji Miyamoto; Hymne à l'amour by Édith Piaf performed by Gautier Capuçon & Jérôme Ducros choreo. by Kenji Miyamoto	Legends of the Fall by James Horner choreo. by Kenji Miyamoto; Lovers (from Chuno) by Ccotbyel choreo. by Kenji Miyamoto	
2022–2023	Tu Sei by Vittorio Grigolo choreo. by Kenji Miyamoto; Le Corsaire by Adolphe Adam, Ludwig Minkus choreo. by Kenji Miyamoto	Legends of the Fall by James Horner choreo. by Kenji Miyamoto	Tu Sei by Vittorio Grigolo choreo. by Kenji Miyamoto
2019–2020	Tu Sei by Vittorio Grigolo choreo. by Kenji Miyamoto	Love Story by Francis Lai choreo. by Kenji Miyamoto	Tu Sei by Vittorio Grigolo choreo. by Kenji Miyamoto
2018–2019	Don't Cry for Me Argentina by Andrew Lloyd Webber choreo. by Kenji Miyamoto	Carmen by Georges Bizet choreo. by Kenji Miyamoto	Sparkling Diamonds from Moulin Rouge! rearranged by Baz Luhrmann choreo. by Kenji Miyamoto; The Godfather (soundtrack) by Nino Rota
2017–2018	Papa, Can You Hear Me? by Michel Legrand choreo. by Kenji Miyamoto	Doctor Zhivago by Maurice Jarre choreo. by Pasquale Camerlengo; Gypsy Songs by Antonín Dvořák choreo. by David Wilson; I Feel Pretty; Maria from West Side Story by Leonard Bernstein choreo. by Nikita Mikhailov	Sparkling Diamonds from Moulin Rouge! rearranged by Baz Luhrmann choreo. by Kenji Miyamoto; The Godfather (soundtrack) by Nino Rota; Por una cabeza from Scent of a Woman by Carlos Gardel, Alfredo Le Pera choreo. by Kenji Miyamoto; Jeongseon Arirang Rapsody; It's Over, Isn't It? (from Steven Universe) performed by Deedee Magno Hall; Someone in the Crowd (from La La Land) by Justin Hurwitz choreo. by Nikita Mikhailov
2016–2017	It's Over, Isn't It? (from Steven Universe) performed by Deedee Magno Hall; Someone in the Crowd (from La La Land) by Justin Hurwitz choreo. by Nikita Mikhailov; Qué rico el mambo by Pérez Prado choreo. by Pasquale Camerlengo	Doctor Zhivago by Maurice Jarre choreo. by Pasquale Camerlengo	Candyman by Christina Aguilera
2015–2016	Mama, I'm a Big Girl Now (from Hairspray) by Marc Shaiman choreo. by Pasquale Camerlengo	Les Misérables by Claude-Michel Schönberg performed by Bournemouth Symphony Orchestra choreo. by Pasquale Camerlengo	Diamonds Are a Girl's Best Friend (from Moulin Rouge!) performed by Nicole Kidman
2014–2015	Invierno Porteno by Astor Piazzolla	Andante spianato et grande polonaise brillante op. 22 by Frédéric Chopin	Diamonds Are a Girl's Best Friend (from Moulin Rouge!) performed by Nicole Kidman
2013–2014	Kalinka by Ivan Larionov	Coppélia by Léo Delibes	Diamonds Are a Girl's Best Friend (from Moulin Rouge!) performed by Nicole Kidman
2012–2013	Annie by Charles Strouse	Waltz by Johann Strauss II	
2011–2012	Sing, Sing, Sing by Louis Prima	Mack and Mabel by Jerry Herman	
2010–2011	unknown	Don Quixote by Ludwig Minkus	

== Competitive highlights ==
=== 2013–14 to 2024–25 ===
GP: Grand Prix; CS: Challenger Series; JGP: Junior Grand Prix

International
Event	13–14	14–15	15–16	16–17	17–18	18–19	19–20	22–23	23–24	24–25
Olympics					7th					
Worlds			14th	10th	WD					
Four Continents			8th	5th	4th					
GP Skate America					WD					
GP Skate Canada				7th		WD				
GP Cup of China					9th					
GP NHK Trophy				9th		WD				
CS Autumn Classic									5th	
CS Denis Ten Memorial								3rd	2nd	
CS Finlandia					9th					
CS Ice Challenge								18th		
CS Nebelhorn							7th			
CS Ondrej Nepela				4th	4th	WD				
CS Tallinn Trophy			8th							
CS U.S. Classic				4th						
CS Warsaw Cup							12th			
Asian Games				1st						
Asian Trophy				2nd						
Denis Ten Memorial							4th			
Universiade								6th		11th
International: Junior
Junior Worlds	6th	9th								
JGP Austria			3rd							
JGP Belarus	4th									
JGP France		5th								
JGP Japan		4th								
JGP Latvia			3rd							
JGP Mexico	5th									
Asian Trophy	3rd	2nd								
Triglav Trophy		1st								
National
South Korea	4th	2nd	2nd	4th	2nd		WD	14th	13th	
Ranking Comp.							10th	13th	15th	14th
Team events
Olympics					9th T 6th P					
Levels: J = Junior; TBD = Assigned; WD = Withdrew; T = Team result; P = Personal result.

=== 2007–08 to 2012–13: Pre-junior international debut ===
Event	10–11	11–12	12–13
South Korean	12th J	3rd	3rd

== Detailed results ==
ISU personal best scores in the +5/-5 GOE System
Segment	Type	Score	Event
Total	**TSS**	**171.00**	2023 CS Denis Ten Memorial Challenge
Short program	**TSS**	**59.70**	2023 CS Denis Ten Memorial Challenge
Short program	TES	34.23	2023 CS Denis Ten Memorial Challenge
Short program	PCS	28.40	2023 CS Autumn Classic International
Free skating	**TSS**	**111.30**	2023 CS Denis Ten Memorial Challenge
Free skating	TES	56.43	2023 CS Denis Ten Memorial Challenge
Free skating	PCS	54.87	2023 CS Denis Ten Memorial Challenge

ISU personal best scores in the +3/-3 GOE System
Segment	Type	Score	Event
Total	**TSS**	**199.26**	2018 Winter Olympics
Short program	**TSS**	**67.77**	2018 Winter Olympics
Short program	TES	37.54	2018 Winter Olympics
Short program	PCS	30.23	2018 Winter Olympics
Free skating	**TSS**	**131.49**	2018 Winter Olympics
Free skating	TES	69.72	2017 World Championships
Free skating	PCS	62.75	2018 Winter Olympics

=== Senior level ===
Current personal best scores are highlighted in bold.

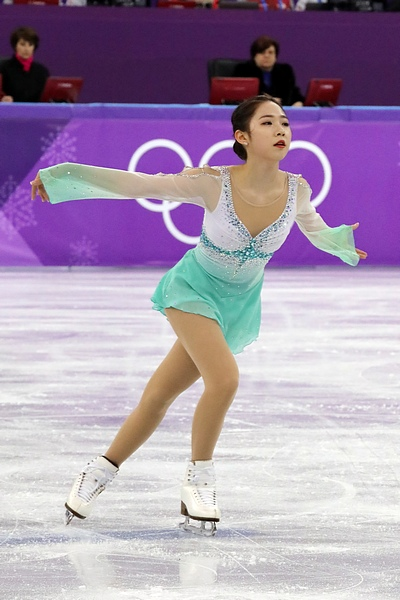
Choi at the 2018 Winter Olympics.

At team events, medals are awarded for team results only.

**2023–24 season**
Date	Event	SP	FS	Total
January 4–7, 2024	2024 South Korean Championships	13; 58.20	12; 116.44	13; 174.64
November 1–4, 2023	2023 CS Denis Ten Memorial Challenge	1; **59.70**	2; **111.30**	2; **171.00**
September 14–17, 2023	2023 CS Autumn Classic International	5; 58.60	5; 104.66	5; 163.26
**2022–23 season**
Date	Event	SP	FS	Total
January 13–15, 2023	2023 Winter Universiade	6; 59.13	6; 112.40	6; 171.53
January 5–8, 2023	2023 South Korean Championships	12; 58.40	14; 111.09	14; 169.49
November 9–13, 2022	2022 CS Ice Challenge	19; 44.78	18; 87.88	18; 132.66
October 26–29, 2022	2022 CS Denis Ten Memorial Challenge	3; 49.76	2; 95.30	3; 145.06
**2019–20 season**
Date	Event	SP	FS	Total
November 14–17, 2019	2019 CS Warsaw Cup	10; 54.89	14; 97.79	12; 152.68
October 9–12, 2019	2019 Denis Ten Memorial	4; 54.65	5; 105.93	4; 160.58
September 25–28, 2019	2019 CS Nebelhorn Trophy	8; 53.91	7; 103.27	7; 157.18
**2018–19 season**
Date	Event	SP	FS	Total
November 9–11, 2018	2018 NHK Trophy	WD	WD	WD
October 26–28, 2018	2018 Skate Canada International	WD	WD	WD
**2017–18 season**
Date	Event	SP	FS	Total
March 19–25, 2018	2018 World Championships	21; 55.30	WD	WD
February 14–23, 2018	2018 Winter Olympics (ladies' singles)	8; 67.77	8; 131.49	7; 199.26
February 9–12, 2018	2018 Winter Olympics (team event)	6; 65.73	–	9^{T}
January 22–28, 2018	2018 Four Continents Championships	5; 62.30	4; 127.93	4; 190.23
January 5–7, 2018	2018 South Korean Championships	4; 64.11	2; 126.01	2; 190.12
November 3–5, 2017	2017 Cup of China	9; 53.90	9; 112.09	9; 165.99
October 6–8, 2017	2017 CS Finlandia Trophy	10; 52.06	9; 106.47	9; 158.53
September 21–23, 2017	2017 CS Ondrej Nepela Trophy	4; 56.62	3; 122.31	4; 178.93
**2016–17 season**
Date	Event	SP	FS	Total
March 27–April 2, 2017	2017 World Championships	11; 62.66	7; 128.45	10; 191.11
February 23–26, 2017	2017 Asian Winter Games	1; 61.30	1; 126.24	1; 187.54
February 15–19, 2017	2017 Four Continents Championships	6; 61.62	4; 120.79	5; 182.41
January 6–8, 2017	2017 South Korean Championships	4; 60.19	3; 121.29	4; 181.48
November 25–27, 2016	2016 NHK Trophy	11; 51.06	9; 114.57	9; 165.63
October 28–30, 2016	2016 Skate Canada	8; 53.29	6; 112.49	7; 165.78
September 28–October 2, 2016	2016 CS Ondrej Nepela Memorial	10; 48.01	2; 112.61	4; 160.62
September 14–18, 2016	2016 CS U.S. Classic	3; 58.70	5; 94.29	4; 152.99
August 4–7, 2016	2016 Asian Open Trophy	2; 51.71	1; 108.56	2; 160.27
**2015–16 season**
Date	Event	SP	FS	Total
March 28 – April 3, 2016	2016 World Championships	16; 56.02	15; 103.90	14; 159.92
February 16–21, 2016	2016 Four Continents Championships	10; 56.79	6; 116.92	8; 173.71
January 8–10, 2016	2016 South Korean Championships	2; 60.32	2; 116.97	2; 177.29
November 17–22, 2015	2015 CS Tallinn Trophy	13; 43.74	7; 102.18	8; 145.92

=== Junior level ===
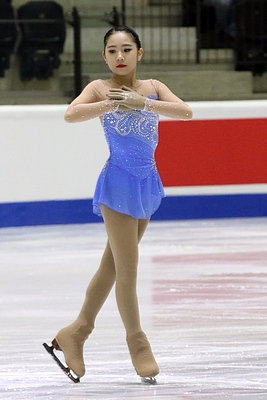
Choi at the 2015 World Junior Figure Skating Championships.

**2015–16 season**
Date	Event	Level	SP	FS	Total
September 9–13, 2015	2015 JGP Austria	Junior	4; 57.27	3; 115.11	3; 172.38
August 26–30, 2015	2015 JGP Latvia	Junior	4; 57.21	3; 111.08	3; 168.29
**2014–15 season**
Date	Event	Level	SP	FS	Total
April 15–19, 2015	2015 Triglav Trophy	Junior	1; 56.61	1; 109.39	1; 166.00
March 2–8, 2015	2015 World Junior Championships	Junior	9; 54.32	9; 102.06	9; 156.38
January 5–9, 2015	2015 South Korean Championships	Senior	2; 54.04	2; 106.76	2; 160.80
September 17–21, 2014	2014 JGP Japan	Junior	7; 52.66	3; 105.94	4; 158.60
August 20–24, 2014	2014 JGP France	Junior	7; 46.04	5; 91.47	5; 137.51
August 6–10, 2014	2014 Asian Open Trophy	Junior	3; 55.55	2; 101.40	2; 156.95
**2013–14 season**
Date	Event	Level	SP	FS	Total
March 10–16, 2014	2014 World Junior Championships	Junior	9; 53.69	6; 108.66	6; 162.35
January 1–5, 2014	2014 South Korean Championships	Senior	10; 50.38	3; 108.26	4; 158.64
September 25–29, 2013	2013 JGP Belarus	Junior	11; 45.18	2; 98.51	4; 143.69
September 4–8, 2013	2013 JGP Mexico	Junior	7; 47.48	5; 94.75	5; 142.23
August 8–11, 2013	2013 Asian Open Trophy	Junior	3; 48.68	3; 92.40	3; 141.08
**2012–13 season**
Date	Event	Level	SP	FS	Total
January 2–6, 2013	2013 South Korean Championships	Senior	2; 53.21	3; 99.88	3; 153.09
**2011–12 season**
Date	Event	Level	SP	FS	Total
January 12–16, 2012	2012 South Korean Championships	Senior	4; 44.20	2; 97.26	3; 141.46
