= 2016 CS Ondrej Nepela Memorial =

Figure skating competition

- Type: ISU Challenger Series
- Date: 30 September – 2 October
- Season: 2016–17
- Location: Bratislava
- Venue: Ondrej Nepela Ice Rink

Champions
- Men's singles: (Russia) Sergei Voronov
- Ladies' singles: (Russia) Maria Sotskova
- Pairs: (Russia) Evgenia Tarasova / Vladimir Morozov
- Ice dance: (Russia) Ekaterina Bobrova / Dmitri Soloviev
- Previous: 2015 CS Ondrej Nepela Trophy
- Next: 2017 CS Ondrej Nepela Trophy

The 2016 CS Ondrej Nepela Memorial (Slovak: Memoriál Ondreja Nepelu) was held on September and October 2016. It is an annual senior international figure skating competition held in Bratislava, Slovakia. It was part of the 2016–17 ISU Challenger Series. Medals were awarded in the disciplines of men's singles, ladies' singles, pair skating, and ice dancing.

The competition returned to the name Ondrej Nepela Memorial after three years as the Ondrej Nepela Trophy. The committee which organized the event in the previous seven years and which has a trademark on Ondrej Nepela Trophy was suspended by the Slovak Figure Skating Association and replaced by another organizing team.

== Entries ==
The International Skating Union published the full preliminary list of entries on 12 September 2016.

Country	Men	Ladies	Pairs	Ice dance
Austria		Natalie Klotz		
Belarus	Anton Karpuk; Alexei Mialiokhin			
Bulgaria	Ivo Gatovski	Daniela Stoeva		
Canada	Kevin Reynolds	Kelsey Wong		Mackenzie Bent / Dmitre Razgulajevs
Czech Republic	Jan Kurník	Eliška Březinová; Michaela Lucie Hanzlíková; Aneta Janiczková		Cortney Mansour / Michal Češka
Estonia	Samuel Koppel	Johanna Allik		
France				Kate Louise Bagnall / Benjamin Allain
Germany		Nathalie Weinzierl		Shari Koch / Christian Nüchtern; Kavita Lorenz / Panagiotis Polizoakis
Hungary		Ivett Tóth		
Israel		Elizaveta Yushchenko		
Italy		Micol Cristini		
Japan	Daichi Miyata; Daisuke Murakami			
Latvia		Angelīna Kučvaļska		Olga Jakushina / Andrey Nevskiy
Lithuania		Aleksandra Golovkina; Elžbieta Kropa	Goda Butkutė / Nikita Ermolaev	Taylor Tran / Saulius Ambrulevičius
Poland	Igor Reznichenko			Natalia Kaliszek / Maksym Spodyriev
Russia	Gordei Gorshkov; Roman Savosin; Sergei Voronov	Alena Leonova; Yulia Lipnitskaya; Maria Sotskova	Yuko Kavaguti / Alexander Smirnov; Evgenia Tarasova / Vladimir Morozov; Natalja Zabijako / Alexander Enbert	Ekaterina Bobrova / Dmitri Soloviev; Tiffany Zahorski / Jonathan Guerreiro
Slovakia	Marco Klepoch; Jakub Kršňák; Michael Neuman	Bronislava Dobiášová; Miroslava Magulová; Nicole Rajičová		Lucie Myslivečková / Lukáš Csölley
South Korea	Lee June-hyoung; Lee Si-hyeong	Byun Ji-hyun; Cho Hee-soo; Choi Da-bin	Kim Su-yeon / Kim Hyung-tae	
Switzerland	Stéphane Walker	Tanja Odermatt		
Ukraine		Anna Khnychenkova		
United Kingdom	Phillip Harris; Charlie Parry-Evans	Nina Povey	Zoe Wilkinson / Christopher Boyadji	
United States	Alexander Johnson	Mariah Bell	Haven Denney / Brandon Frazier	Anastasia Cannuscio / Colin McManus; Madison Chock / Evan Bates

Withdrew before starting orders drawn

- Men: Krzysztof Gała (POL), Ondrej Spiegl (SWE)
- Ladies: Kristen Spours (GBR), Alexandra Hagarová (SVK), Nina Letenayová (SVK)
- Pairs: Aliona Savchenko / Bruno Massot (GER)
- Ice dance: Adelina Galayavieva / Laurent Abecassis (FRA), Carter Marie Jones / Richard Sharpe (GBR), Carolina Moscheni / Ádám Lukács (HUN)

Added

- Ladies: Ivett Tóth (HUN), Micol Cristini (ITA)

== Results ==
=== Men ===
Rank	Name	Nation	Total points	SP		FS	
1	Sergei Voronov	Russia	237.42	1	80.21	1	157.21
2	Kevin Reynolds	Canada	227.80	2	75.35	3	152.45
3	Roman Savosin	Russia	222.37	5	68.10	2	154.27
4	Daisuke Murakami	Japan	216.06	8	66.17	4	149.89
5	Gordei Gorshkov	Russia	208.84	3	71.73	7	137.11
6	Alexander Johnson	United States	208.64	4	71.41	6	137.23
7	Stéphane Walker	Switzerland	205.18	6	66.63	5	138.55
8	Phillip Harris	United Kingdom	189.66	7	66.49	8	123.17
9	Igor Reznichenko	Poland	174.26	9	59.14	9	115.12
10	Daichi Miyata	Japan	170.65	13	56.68	10	113.97
11	Lee Si-Hyeong	South Korea	153.44	14	52.10	11	101.34
12	Anton Karpuk	Belarus	152.71	12	57.21	13	95.50
13	Charlie Parry-Evans	United Kingdom	150.68	15	50.20	12	100.48
14	Michael Neuman	Slovakia	149.16	11	57.57	17	91.59
15	Samuel Koppel	Estonia	139.51	17	47.43	15	92.08
16	Jakub Kršňák	Slovakia	138.45	18	46.29	14	92.16
17	Jan Kurník	Czech Republic	136.44	19	44.50	16	91.94
18	Ivo Gatovski	Bulgaria	127.40	16	49.71	19	77.69
19	Marco Klepoch	Slovakia	122.55	20	41.77	18	80.78
WD	Lee June-hyoung	South Korea		10	58.26		

=== Ladies ===
Rank	Name	Nation	Total points	SP		FS	
1	Maria Sotskova	Russia	189.96	2	61.58	1	128.38
2	Yulia Lipnitskaya	Russia	165.46	1	63.16	5	102.30
3	Mariah Bell	United States	161.72	5	56.58	4	105.14
4	Choi Da-bin	South Korea	160.62	10	48.01	2	112.61
5	Nicole Rajičová	Slovakia	158.82	6	52.62	3	106.20
6	Alena Leonova	Russia	151.12	4	56.84	7	94.28
7	Byun Ji-hyun	South Korea	149.63	3	57.76	8	91.87
8	Nathalie Weinzierl	Germany	148.23	8	51.15	6	97.08
9	Cho Hee-soo	South Korea	142.31	9	50.71	9	91.60
10	Ivett Tóth	Hungary	140.58	7	51.71	11	88.87
11	Michaela Lucie Hanzlíková	Czech Republic	137.31	11	47.23	10	90.08
12	Angelīna Kučvaļska	Latvia	131.51	13	45.87	12	85.64
13	Aleksandra Golovkina	Lithuania	128.57	12	45.89	13	82.68
14	Micol Cristini	Italy	124.39	14	45.08	14	79.31
15	Bronislava Dobiášová	Slovakia	121.36	16	43.26	15	78.10
16	Elžbieta Kropa	Lithuania	121.32	15	43.41	16	77.91
17	Anna Khnychenkova	Ukraine	119.31	18	41.88	17	77.43
18	Johanna Allik	Estonia	116.55	17	42.93	19	73.62
19	Nina Povey	United Kingdom	116.37	19	41.27	18	75.10
20	Elizaveta Yushchenko	Israel	111.80	20	41.00	21	70.80
21	Tanja Odermatt	Switzerland	111.04	21	39.55	20	71.49
22	Natalie Klotz	Austria	100.23	24	34.15	22	66.08
23	Kelsey Wong	Canada	98.32	23	35.25	25	63.07
24	Aneta Janiczková	Czech Republic	96.79	25	32.35	23	64.44
25	Miroslava Magulová	Slovakia	92.45	27	28.18	24	64.27
26	Daniela Stoeva	Bulgaria	83.47	26	29.10	26	54.37
WD	Eliška Březinová	Czech Republic		22	37.97		

=== Pairs ===
Rank	Name	Nation	Total points	SP		FS	
1	Evgenia Tarasova / Vladimir Morozov	Russia	197.80	1	69.06	1	128.74
2	Yuko Kavaguti / Alexander Smirnov	Russia	185.42	2	68.56	2	116.86
3	Natalja Zabijako / Alexander Enbert	Russia	181.38	3	67.04	3	114.34
4	Haven Denney / Brandon Frazier	United States	172.82	4	59.66	4	113.16
5	Goda Butkutė / Nikita Ermolaev	Lithuania	145.94	6	50.54	5	95.40
6	Zoe Wilkinson / Christopher Boyadji	United Kingdom	129.30	5	50.94	6	78.36
7	Kim Su-yeon / Kim Hyung-tae	South Korea	118.00	7	39.70	7	78.30

=== Ice dancing ===
Rank	Name	Nation	Total points	SD		FD	
1	Ekaterina Bobrova / Dmitri Soloviev	Russia	178.84	2	71.04	1	107.80
2	Madison Chock / Evan Bates	United States	170.92	1	72.72	2	98.20
3	Tiffany Zahorski / Jonathan Guerreiro	Russia	165.64	3	68.04	3	97.60
4	Natalia Kaliszek / Maksym Spodyriev	Poland	146.86	5	60.24	5	86.62
5	Kavita Lorenz / Panagiotis Polizoakis	Germany	146.32	4	62.34	6	83.98
6	Cortney Mansour / Michal Češka	Czech Republic	143.10	7	56.32	4	86.78
7	Anastasia Cannuscio / Colin McManus	United States	138.76	8	55.72	7	83.04
8	Lucie Myslivečková / Lukáš Csölley	Slovakia	137.22	6	58.04	8	79.18
9	Taylor Tran / Saulius Ambrulevičius	Lithuania	131.34	9	53.18	9	78.16
10	Justyna Plutowska / Jeremie Flemin	Poland	124.66	11	48.68	11	75.98
11	Olga Jakushina / Andrey Nevskiy	Latvia	124.50	13	48.26	10	76.24
12	Mackenzie Bent / Dmitre Razgulajevs	Canada	121.22	12	48.30	12	72.92
13	Shari Koch / Christian Nüchtern	Germany	118.10	10	50.92	13	67.18
WD	Kate Louise Bagnall / Benjamin Allain	France					
