= Son Suh-hyun =

South Korean figure skater (born 1999)

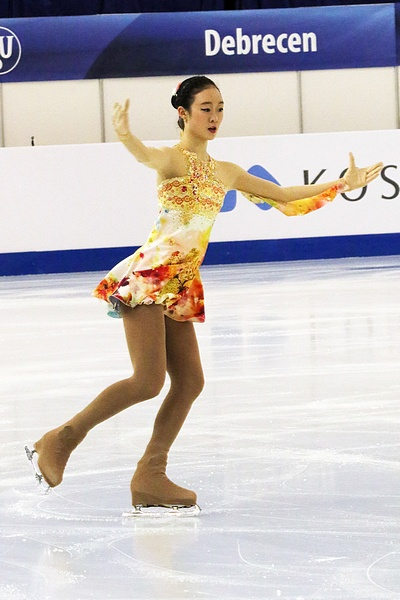
- Son at the 2016 World Junior Championships

Personal information
- Native name: 손서현
- Born: September 7, 1999 (age 26) Seoul, South Korea
- Home town: Seoul, South Korea
- Height: 1.65 m (5 ft 5 in)

Figure skating career
- Country: South Korea
- Coach: Chi Hyun-jung
- Skating club: Gwacheon
- Began skating: 2006

- Son Suh-hyun
- Hangul: 손서현
- RR: Son Seohyeon
- MR: Son Sŏhyŏn

Son Suh-hyun (Korean: 손서현; born September 7, 1999) is a South Korean figure skater. She has competed in the free skate at two ISU Championships – the 2016 World Junior Championships in Debrecen, Hungary, and the 2017 Four Continents Championships in Gangneung, South Korea.

== Programs ==
| Season | Short program | Free skating |
|---|---|---|
| 2017–18 | Glitter in the Air sung by Pink | Les Misérables by Claude-Michel Schönberg |
| 2016–17 | Spartacus composed by Jerry Goldsmith choreo by Jeremy Abbott | Hunhwaga by Saeum choreo by Yebin Mok |
| 2015–16 | I remember; Happy by sung by Mocca choreo by Shin Yea-ji | Hunhwaga by Saeum choreo by Yebin Mok |
| 2014–15 | The Fifth Element by Éric Serra | The Last of the Mohicans by Randy Edelman |
| 2013–14 | The Fifth Element by Éric Serra | Butterfly Lovers' Violin Concerto |

== Competitive highlights ==
GP: Grand Prix; CS: Challenger Series; JGP: Junior Grand Prix

International
| Event | 12–13 | 13–14 | 14–15 | 15–16 | 16–17 | 17–18 |
|---|---|---|---|---|---|---|
| Four Continents | | | | | 19th | |
| CS Autumn Classic | | | | | 17th | |
| CS Denkova-Staviski | | | | 7th | | |
| Asian Open | | | | | | 5th |
| Lombardia Trophy | | | | 4th | | |
International: Junior, Novice
| Junior Worlds | | | | 23rd | | |
| Volvo Open Cup | | 3rd J | | | | |
National
| South Korean | 19th J | 9th J | 19th | 6th | 12th | |
Levels: N = Advanced novice; J = Junior

== Detailed results ==
**2017–18 season**
| Date | Event | Level | SP | FS | Total |
| August 2–5, 2017 | 2017 Asian Figure Skating Trophy | Senior | 5; 45.54 | 5; 78.71 | 5; 124.25 |
**2016–17 season**
| Date | Event | Level | SP | FS | Total |
| February 15–19, 2017 | 2017 ISU Four Continents Championships | Senior | 22; 38.61 | 16; 83.74 | 19; 122.35 |
| January 6–8, 2017 | 2017 South Korean Championships | Senior | 8; 54.96 | 12; 97.29 | 12; 152.25 |
| September 28 – October 1, 2016 | 2016 CS Autumn Classic | Senior | 17; 31.91 | 16; 65.94 | 17; 97.85 |
**2015–16 season**
| Date | Event | Level | SP | FS | Total |
| March 14–20, 2016 | 2016 World Junior Championships | Junior | 19; **46.18** | 23; 69.23 | 23; 115.41 |
| January 8–10, 2016 | 2016 South Korean Championships | Senior | 12; 52.00 | 5; 107.32 | 6; 159.32 |
| October 20–25, 2015 | 2015 CS Denkova-Staviski | Senior | 9; 44.03 | 7; **89.78** | 7; **133.81** |
| September 17–20, 2015 | 2015 Lombardia Trophy | Senior | 7; 47.90 | 2; 96.26 | 4; 144.16 |
**2014–15 season**
| Date | Event | Level | SP | FS | Total |
| January 7–9, 2015 | 2015 South Korean Championships | Senior | 19; 44.99 | 17; 84.04 | 17; 129.03 |
| November 5–9, 2014 | 2014 Volvo Open Cup | Junior | 5; 45.43 | 4; 87.80 | 3; 133.23 |
**2013–14 season**
| Date | Event | Level | SP | FS | Total |
| January 3–5, 2014 | 2014 South Korean Championships | Senior | 8; 41.80 | 8; 82.08 | 9; 123.88 |
**2012–13 season**
| Date | Event | Level | SP | FS | Total |
| January 4–6, 2013 | 2013 South Korean Championships | Junior | 21; 32.84 | 18; 59.35 | 18; 92.19 |

- Personal bests highlighted in **bold**.
