= Lee June-hyoung =

South Korean figure skater (born 1996)

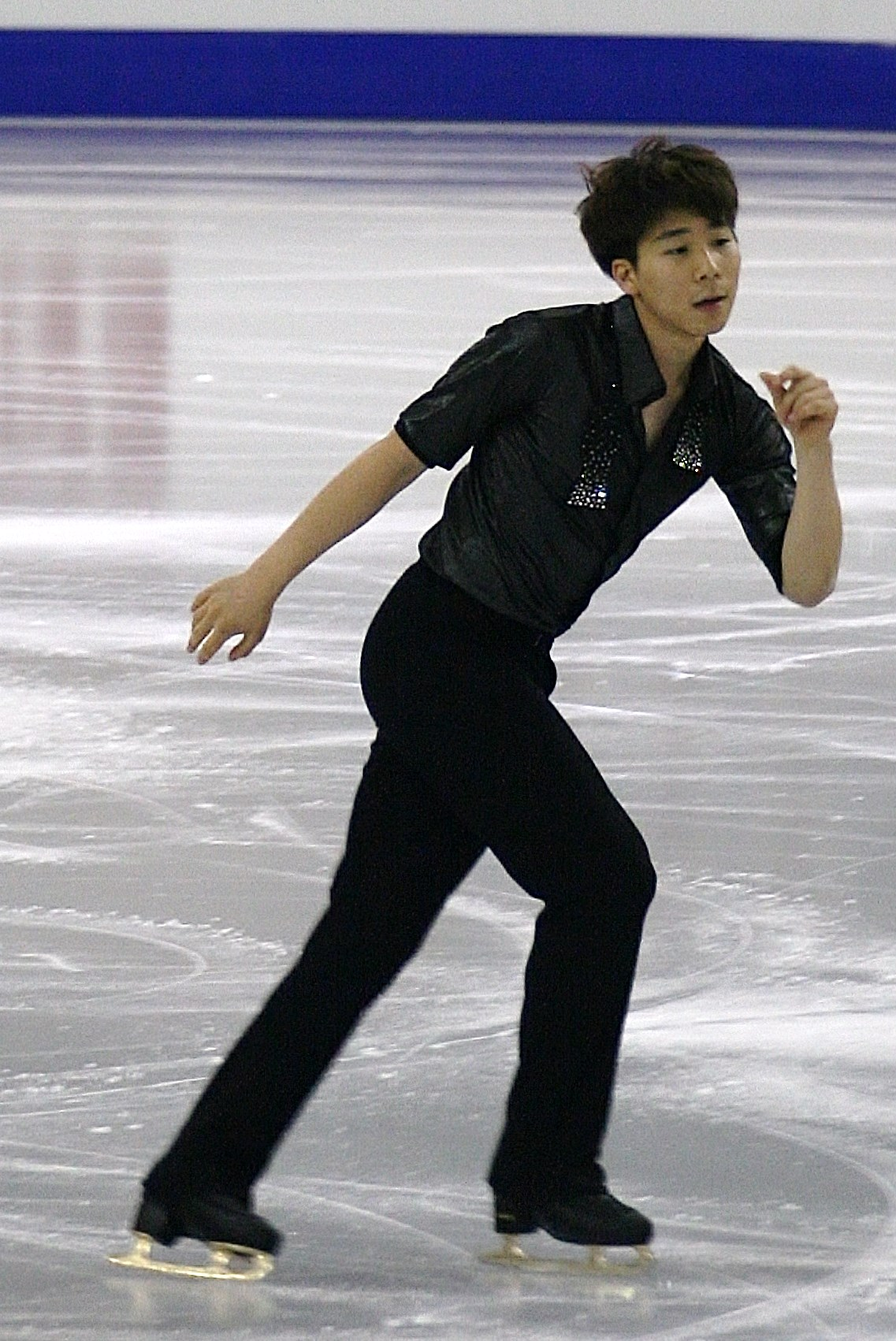
- Lee at the 2014 ISU Junior Grand Prix Final

Personal information
- Native name: 이준형
- Born: October 28, 1996 (age 29) Seoul, South Korea
- Home town: Uijeongbu, Gyeonggi Province, South Korea
- Height: 1.74 m (5 ft 8 1/2 in)

Figure skating career
- Country: South Korea
- Retired: 2021

- Lee June-hyoung
- Hangul: 이준형
- Hanja: 李俊型
- RR: I Junhyeong
- MR: I Chunhyŏng

Lee June-hyoung (Korean: 이준형; born October 28, 1996) is a South Korean former competitive figure skater. He is the 2014 JGP France champion and a three-time South Korean national champion (2013, 2015, 2016). He is the first South Korean male figure skater who stood on the podium and won gold at ISU events. Also, he is the first Korean male skater to qualify for the ISU Junior Grand Prix Final.

== Personal life ==
Lee June-hyoung was born in Seoul, South Korea. His mother, Oh Ji Youn, is a figure skating coach.

== Career ==
=== Early years ===
Lee was coached by his mother from the age of seven to 14. He started working with Chi Hyun-jung as his coach in 2010. Lee placed 3rd at both the Korean Junior Grand Prix qualification trials and the Korean Nationals.

=== 2011–2012 season ===
The 2011–2012 season was Lee's breakthout season. He included five different triple jumps in his program and improved jump consistency. In August, he was selected to represent Team Korea by placing second at the Korean Junior Grand Prix qualification trials. At the Asian Trophy, he took silver in the junior category.

Making his Junior Grand Prix (JGP) debut, Lee placed 4th at the 2011 JGP event in Latvia. At his second assignment, in Milan, Italy, he won bronze and became the first South Korean male figure skater to medal at an ISU event. He won the Korean Ranking competition in November and placed 4th at the Winter Youth Olympics. He placed 18th at the World Junior Championships.

=== 2012–2013 season ===
Lee started his season with a new free program, "Queen medley", but returned to his previous season's free program, "The Barber of Seville", at his first Junior Grand Prix event. He won South Korean Nationals, but could not compete at the senior World Championships because he did not meet the minimum technical score requirement for the event. He placed 13th at the World Junior Championships. In February, he landed a triple Axel jump during the short program segment at the Four Continents Championships.

=== 2013–2014 season ===
In the middle of the season, he changed his free skating from "The Planets" to "The Phantom of the Opera", which was shown at the Korean Nationals. At the nationals, with total score of 206.88, Lee became the first Korean male skater who scored over 200 points in domestic competitions. In February, he placed 14th at the 2013 Four Continents Figure Skating Championships in Taipei. In March, he placed 16th at the World Junior Championships in Sofia, Bulgaria.

=== 2014–2015 season ===
Competing in the 2014–15 JGP series, Lee won gold at his first event, JGP France, with overall score of 203.81. This accomplishment made him the first South Korean male figure skater to win an ISU event. By obtaining bronze at JGP Croatia, he became the first Korean male skater to qualify for an ISU Junior Grand Prix Final. In December, at the ISU Junior Grand Prix Final in Barcelona, Spain, he placed fifth in the short program and sixth in the free skating to place sixth place overall.

In January, Lee beat his rival, Kim Jin-seo, to win his second national title. He was nominated to the South Korean team for the 2015 Four Continents Championship. At the competition, he placed fifteenth in the short program and nineteenth in the free skate to place eighteenth overall. He placed 19th at the 2015 World Championships.

=== 2015–2016 season ===
During the summer, Lee was involved in a traffic accident as a passenger. A car driven by his mother was struck from behind by another car. After this incident, Lee started having back problems.

Lee opened the 2015–16 figure skating season by placing 10th at the 2015 Finlandia Trophy. He participated in the 2015 Skate Canada International with his new coach Shin Hea-Sook and placed 12th.

During the later half of the season, he placed sixteenth at the 2016 Four Continents Championship and placed 24th at the 2016 World Championships.

=== 2016–2017 season ===
Lee was still troubled by injuries during this season. He finished 16th at the 2017 Winter Universiade in Almaty, 18th at the 2017 Four Continents Championship in Gangneung, and 13th at the 2017 Asian Winter Games in Sapporo.

=== 2017–2018 season ===
Lee started his international season by placing 7th at the Philadelphia Summer International. He placed 5th at the 2017 CS Nebelhorn Trophy, qualifying a ticket for South Korea in the men's singles category for the 2018 Winter Olympics, with a new set of personal best results.

=== Retirement ===
Due to the COVID-19 pandemic, Lee could not participate in skating events during the 2020–2021 season. At the end of the season, he started a new career in musical theatre.

== Programs ==
Season	Short program	Free skating	Exhibition
2019–2020	I Put a Spell on You by Screamin' Jay Hawkins, Herb Slotkin covered by Jeff Beck choreo. by Lee June-hyoung	The Artist choreo. by David Wilson	
2018–2019	Eternally by Charlie Chaplin covered by Il Volo choreo. by David Wilson	Piano Concerto No. 2; 3rd Movement by Sergei Rachmaninoff choreo. by David Wilson	
2017–2018	Eternally by Charlie Chaplin covered by Il Volo choreo. by David Wilson	Bohemian Rhapsody by Queen choreo. by David Wilson	Rinascero (Frankenstein) by Astor Piazzolla performed by Erwin Schrott choreo. by Lee June-hyoung; El Norte by Gotan Project; Uptown Funk by Mark Ronson feat. Bruno Mars choreo. by Lee Kyu-hyun; Exogenesis: Symphony Part 3 by Muse choreo. by Jeffrey Buttle; It's Me (Pick Me) from Produce 101 season 2
2016–2017	Tosca by Giacomo Puccini choreo. by Kenji Miyamoto	Moulin Rouge! choreo. by Kenji Miyamoto	
2015–2016	Exogenesis: Symphony Part 3 by Muse choreo. by Jeffrey Buttle	Romeo + Juliet by Craig Armstrong choreo. by Tom Dickson; O Verona; Escape from Mantua; Balcony Scene	눈 먼 사랑 (Blind Love) by Ensemble Sinawi choreo. by Lee June-hyoung; Uptown Funk by Mark Ronson feat. Bruno Mars choreo. by Lee Kyu-hyun
2014–2015	The Wild Party by Buddy Bregman choreo. by Jeffrey Buttle	The Phantom of the Opera by Andrew Lloyd Webber choreo. by Cindy Stuart	Michael Jackson medley choreo. by Shin Yea-ji
2013–2014	Para Tí by Joshua Bell, Tiempo Libre choreo. by Cindy Stuart	The Phantom of the Opera by Andrew Lloyd Webber choreo. by Cindy Stuart; The Planets, Op. 32 by Gustav Holst choreo. by Tom Dickson	
2012–2013	Capone (from Celtic Tiger) by Ronan Hardiman choreo. by Christopher Conte	The Barber of Seville by Gioachino Rossini choreo. by Tom Dickson; Who Wants to Live Forever; Bohemian Rhapsody; We Will Rock You by Queen choreo. by Christopher Conte	
2011–2012	Jelly and the Vamp by Luther Henderson choreo. by Cindy Stuart	The Barber of Seville by Gioachino Rossini choreo. by Tom Dickson	Hard to Handle by Otis Redding choreo. by Cindy Stuart
2010–2011	Sing, Sing, Sing by Louis Prima choreo. by Cindy Stuart	Don Juan by Félix Gray choreo. by Cindy Stuart	Hard to Handle by Otis Redding choreo. by Cindy Stuart
2009–2010	Love Story (1970 film) by Francis Lai choreo. by Cindy Stuart	Harbinger by Mike Oldfield choreo. by Cindy Stuart	
2008–2009	The Mission (1986 film) by Ennio Morricone choreo. by Cindy Stuart	Adiós Nonino by Ástor Pantaleón Piazzolla choreo. by Cindy Stuart	

== Competitive highlights ==
GP: Grand Prix; CS: Challenger Series; JGP: Junior Grand Prix

=== 2011–2012 to present ===
International
Event	11–12	12–13	13–14	14–15	15–16	16–17	17–18	18–19	19–20
Worlds				19th	24th				
Four Continents		17th	14th	18th	16th	18th	14th	14th	17th
GP NHK Trophy								9th	
GP Skate Canada					12th				
CS Finlandia					10th				
CS Lombardia								11th	
CS Nebelhorn							5th		
CS Ondrej Nepela									8th
CS Warsaw Cup									3rd
Asian Games						13th			
Asian Trophy		3rd	3rd	3rd		4th			
Denis Ten Memorial									7th
Philadelphia							7th		
Shanghai Trophy									6th
Triglav Trophy			5th	2nd					
Universiade						16th		13th	
International: Junior
Junior Worlds	18th	13th	16th						
Youth Olympics	4th								
JGP Final				6th					
JGP Belarus			5th						
JGP Croatia				3rd					
JGP France				1st					
JGP Italy	3rd								
JGP Latvia	4th								
JGP Mexico			6th						
JGP Turkey		9th							
JGP U.S.		5th							
Asian Trophy	2nd								
National
South Korea	2nd	1st	2nd	1st	1st	5th	3rd	2nd	3rd
TBD = Assigned, WD = Withdrew; J = Junior level

=== 2006–2007 to 2010–2011: Pre-international debut ===
National
Event	06–07	07–08	08–09	09–10	10–11
South Korean Champ.	1st N	1st N	2nd J	1st J	3rd
Levels: N = Novice; J = Junior

== Detailed results ==
=== Senior level ===
2019–20 season
Date	Event	SP	FS	Total
February 4 – 9, 2020	2020 Four Continents Championships	14; **72.74**	17; **126.21**	17; **198.95**
4–5 January 2020	2020 South Korean Championships	2; 82.70	3; 143.82	3; 226.52
14–17 November 2019	2019 CS Warsaw Cup	8; 66.03	2; 139.17	3; 205.20
9–12 October 2019	2019 Denis Ten Memorial Challenge	8; 61.58	7; 124.57	7; 186.15
3–5 October 2019	2019 Shanghai Trophy	6; 67.34	6; 122.17	6; 189.51
19–21 September 2019	2019 CS Ondrej Nepela Memorial	9; 59.49	8; 119.75	8; 172.24
2018–19 season
Date	Event	SP	FS	Total
March 6–9, 2019	2019 Winter Universiade	13; 60.68	12; 126.57	13; 187.25
February 7–10, 2019	2019 Four Continents Championships	16; 64.19	14; 123.91	14; 188.10
January 11–13, 2018	2019 South Korean Championships	3; 64.41	2; 129.92	2; 194.33
November 9–11, 2018	2018 NHK Trophy	11; 66.16	9; 122.10	9; 188.26
September 12–16, 2018	2018 CS Lombardia Trophy	8; 68.54	12; 107.99	11; 176.53
**2017–18 season**
Date	Event	SP	FS	Total
January 22–28, 2018	2018 Four Continents Championships	16; 69.93	13; 141.93	14; 211.86
January 5–7, 2018	2018 South Korean Championships	2; 76.80	3; 146.18	3; 222.98
September 27–30, 2017	2017 CS Nebelhorn Trophy	4; **74.37**	4; **148.52**	5; **222.89**
August 3–5, 2017	2017 Philadelphia Summer International	6; 71.92	8; 127.46	7; 199.38
**2016–17 season**
Date	Event	SP	FS	Total
February 23–26, 2017	2017 Asian Winter Games	13; 57.67	11; 126.76	13; 184.43
February 15–19, 2017	2017 Four Continents Championships	16; 67.55	18; 120.03	18; 187.58
February 1–5, 2017	2017 Winter Universiade	16; 65.08	16; 117.45	16; 182.53
January 6–8, 2017	2017 South Korean Championships	3; 64.19	6; 114.37	5; 178.56
September 28–October 2, 2016	2016 CS Ondrej Nepela Memorial	10; 58.26	WD	
August 4–7, 2016	2016 Asian Open Trophy	4; 61.08	4; 122.51	4; 183.59
2015–16 season
Date	Event	SP	FS	Total
March 23–29, 2016	2016 World Championships	18; 70.05	24; 104.83	24; 174.88
February 16–21, 2016	2016 Four Continents Championships	10; 67.35	19; 113.57	16; 180.92
January 8–10, 2016	2016 South Korean Championships	1; 75.10	1; 148.62	1; 223.72
October 30–November 1, 2015	2015 Skate Canada International	12; 47.19	12; 104.86	12; 152.05
October 8–11, 2015	2015 CS Finlandia Trophy	11; 57.07	10; 115.90	10; 172.92
2014–15 season
Date	Event	SP	FS	Total
April 15–19, 2015	2015 Triglav Trophy	2; 59.60	2; 117.00	2; 176.60
March 23–29, 2015	2015 World Championships	24; 64.51	18; 133.01	19; 197.52
February 9–15, 2015	2015 Four Continents Championships	15; 63.35	19; 116.71	18; 180.06
January 5–9, 2015	2015 South Korean Championships	2; 68.75	1; 141.15	1; 209.90
August 8–10, 2014	2014 Asian Open Trophy	3; 66.67	2; 140.12	3; 206.79

=== Junior level ===
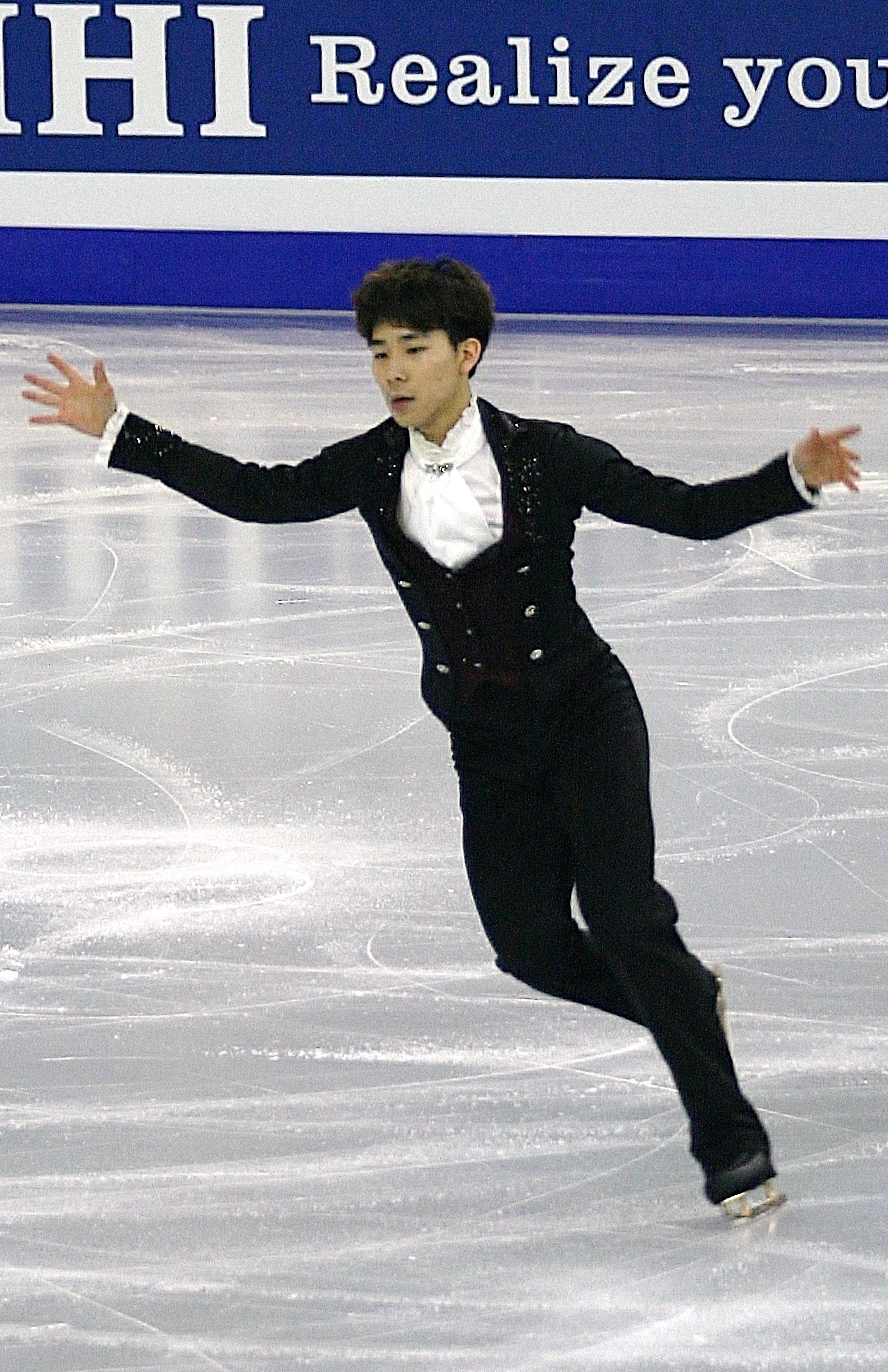
Lee at the 2014–15 JGP Final.

**2014–15 season**
Date	Event	Level	SP	FS	Total
December 11–14, 2014	2014–15 JGP Final	Junior	5; 57.42	6; 122.97	6; 180.39
October 9–11, 2014	2014 JGP Croatia	Junior	3; **68.52**	3; 135.40	3; **203.92**
September 4–7, 2014	2014 JGP France	Junior	1; 67.88	1; **135.93**	1; 203.81
**2013–14 season**
Date	Event	Level	SP	FS	Total
March 12–14, 2014	2014 World Junior Championships	Junior	18; 58.11	15; 111.89	16; 170.00
January 22–25, 2014	2014 Four Continents Championships	Senior	19; 57.65	12; 126.49	14; 184.14
January 3–5, 2014	2014 South Korean Championships	Senior	4; 67.30	1; 139.58	2; 206.88
September 25–28, 2013	2013 JGP Belarus	Junior	5; 60.51	5; 113.90	5; 174.41
September 4–7, 2013	2013 JGP Mexico	Junior	5; 62.27	6; 108.12	6; 170.39
August 8–11, 2013	2013 Asian Open Trophy	Senior	3; 60.65	3; 118.31	3; 178.96
**2012–13 season**
Date	Event	Level	SP	FS	Total
Feb. 25 – Mar. 3, 2013	2013 World Junior Championships	Junior	13; 54.15	13; 112.06	13; 166.21
February 8–11, 2013	2013 Four Continents Championships	Senior	18; 55.63	16; 120.76	17; 176.39
January 4–6, 2013	2013 South Korean Championships	Senior	1; 60.80	1; 122.88	1; 183.68
September 19–22, 2012	2012 JGP Turkey	Junior	11; 44.04	8; 102.05	9; 146.09
Aug. 29 – Sep. 2, 2012	2012 JGP USA	Junior	5; 53.38	5; 103.07	5; 156.45
August 8–12, 2012	2012 Asian Open Trophy	Senior	2; 51.04	3; 92.16	3; 143.20
**2011–12 season**
Date	Event	Level	SP	FS	Total
Feb. 27 – Mar. 3, 2012	2012 World Junior Championships	Junior	15; 55.74	18; 103.19	18; 158.93
January 14–22, 2012	2012 Winter Youth Olympics	Junior	7; 50.93	4; 110.06	4; 160.99
January 7–8, 2012	2012 South Korean Championships	Senior	2; 59.89	2; 120.94	2; 180.83
October 5–8, 2011	2011 JGP Italy	Junior	4; 57.98	4; 118.50	3; 176.48
Aug. 31 – Sep. 3, 2011	2011 JGP Latvia	Junior	3; 58.06	5; 113.69	4; 171.75
August 23–25, 2011	2011 Asian Open Trophy	Junior	3; 51.23	3; 108.63	2; 159.86
**2010–11 season**
Date	Event	Level	SP	FS	Total
January 14–16, 2011	2011 South Korean Championships	Senior	3; 52.13	3; 107.15	3; 159.28

2009–10 season
Date	Event	Level	SP	FS	Total
January 9–10, 2010	2010 South Korean Championships	Junior	2; 36.94	1; 73.94	1; 110.88
2008–09 season
Date	Event	Level	SP	FS	Total
January 9–10, 2009	2009 South Korean Championships	Junior	3; 38.75	2; 79.26	2; 117.56

- ISU personal bests highlighted in **Bold**.
