= 2017 South Korean Figure Skating Championships =

Figure skating competition

- Type: National Championship
- Date: January 6 – 8
- Season: 2016–17
- Location: Gangneung
- Venue: Gangneung Ice Arena

Champions
- Men's singles: Cha Jun-hwan
- Ladies' singles: Lim Eun-soo
- Pairs: Ji Min-ji / Themistocles Leftheris
- Ice dance: Min Yura / Alexander Gamelin
- Previous: 2016 South Korean Championships
- Next: 2018 South Korean Championships

The 2017 South Korean Figure Skating Championships (Korean: 제71회 전국 남녀 피겨스케이팅 종합선수권대회) were held from January 6–8, 2017 at the Gangneung Ice Arena in Gangneung. It was organized by Korea Skating Union. This was the 71st edition of those championships held.

Skaters competed in the disciplines of men's singles, ladies' singles, pair skating, and ice dancing on the senior, junior levels for the title of national champion of South Korea. The results of the national championships were used to choose the Korean teams to the 2017 World Junior Championships and 2017 World Championships.

The Korea Skating Union published the list of entries on December 28, 2016. Cha Jun-hwan won his first national title. Lim Eun-soo also won her first title.

== Senior results ==
=== Senior men ===
Rank	Name	Total points	SP		FS	
1	Cha Jun-hwan	238.07	1	81.83	1	156.24
2	Kim Jin-seo	216.16	2	77.25	2	138.91
3	Lee Si-hyeong	189.91	5	58.46	3	131.45
4	Byun Se-jong	182.81	4	59.79	4	123.02
5	Lee June-hyoung	178.56	3	64.19	6	114.37
6	An Geon-hyeong	167.21	7	50.30	5	116.91
7	Park Sung-hoon	161.29	8	49.08	7	112.21
8	Lee Dong-won	160.90	6	53.60	8	107.30

=== Senior ladies ===
Rank	Name	Total points	SP		FS	
1	Lim Eun-soo	191.98	1	64.53	1	127.45
2	Kim Ye-lim	183.27	2	63.98	4	119.29
3	Kim Na-hyun	181.78	3	62.87	5	118.91
4	Choi Da-bin	181.48	4	60.19	3	121.29
5	You Young	180.88	6	58.71	2	122.17
6	Kam Yun-kyung	170.81	5	59.37	7	111.44
7	An So-hyun	168.68	7	58.23	8	110.45
8	Kim Ha-nul	167.56	14	50.31	6	117.25
9	Lee Hyun-soo	158.84	15	50.02	9	108.82
10	To Ji-hun	155.56	16	49.89	10	105.67
11	Jeon Gyo-hee	153.20	10	52.80	11	100.40
12	Son Suh-hyun	152.25	8	54.96	12	97.29
13	Kim Hae-jin	146.83	11	52.49	15	94.34
14	Noh Chae-eun	145.12	12	51.18	16	93.94
15	Lee Seo-young	145.05	9	52.88	18	92.17
16	Choi Yu-jin	143.03	13	50.58	17	92.45
17	Kwon Ye-na	141.94	17	47.34	14	94.60
18	Jeon Su-Been	140.85	19	45.90	13	94.95
19	Kim Bo-young	137.20	20	45.89	19	91.31
20	Yoon Eun-su	136.61	18	47.22	20	89.39
21	Lee Ji-won	131.19	21	44.85	21	86.34
22	Kang Soo-min	126.06	24	42.55	22	83.51
23	Kim Sena	120.62	23	43.37	23	77.25
24	Youn Ha-rim	112.46	22	44.41	24	68.05
Did not advance to free skating
25	Lee Ji-Yun	42.03	25	42.03	—	
26	Kim Tae-kyung	41.99	26	41.99	—	
27	Shim Kyoung-yeon	41.85	27	41.85	—	
28	Jang Hyun-su	39.77	28	39.77	—	
29	Choi Hwi	39.71	29	39.71	—	
30	Yoon Min-seo	38.68	30	38.68	—	
31	Kim Ah-hyun	37.56	31	37.56	—	
32	Lim Na-yeong	35.35	32	35.35	—	
33	Park Go-eun	35.29	33	35.29	—	
34	Kim Su-hyun	34.42	34	34.42	—	
35	Cho Yu-bin	24.54	35	24.54	—	

=== Senior pairs ===
Rank	Name	Total points	SP		FS	
1	Ji Min-ji / Themistocles Leftheris	140.49	2	47.22	2	93.27
2	Kim Su-yeon / Kim Hyung-tae	137.62	3	44.24	1	93.38
3	Kim Kyu-eun / Alex Kang-chan Kam	127.57	1	49.30	3	78.27

=== Senior ice dance ===
Rank	Name	Total points	SD		FD	
1	Yura Min / Alexander Gamelin	134.36	1	56.34	1	78.02
2	Lee Ho-jung / Richard Kang-in Kam	127.80	2	51.25	2	76.55

== International team selections ==
=== Winter Universiade ===
Based on the results of the 2016 KSU President Cup Ranking Competition from October 14–16, 2016.

	Men	Ladies
1	Kim Jin-seo	~~Park So-youn~~ (withdrew)
2	Lee June-hyoung	Kim Hae-jin
3	Lee Dong-won	Choi Hwi

=== Four Continents Championships ===
Based on the results of the 2016 KSU President Cup Ranking Competition from October 14–16, 2016.

	Men	Ladies	Pairs	Ice dancing
1	Kim Jin-seo	Kim Na-hyun	Ji Min-ji / Themistocles Leftheris	Min Yura / Alexander Gamelin
2	Lee June-hyoung	~~Park So-youn~~ (withdrew)	Kim Kyu-eun / Alex Kang-chan Kam	Lee Ho-jung / Richard Kang-in Kam
3	Lee Si-hyeong	Choi Da-bin	Kim Su-yeon / Kim Hyung-tae	
1st alt.	Byun Se-jong	Son Suh-hyun (added)		
2nd alt.		Kim Sena		
3rd alt.		Byun Ji-hyun		

=== Asian Winter Games ===
Based on the results of the 2016 KSU President Cup Ranking Competition from October 14–16, 2016.

	Men	Ladies	Pairs	Ice dancing
1	Kim Jin-seo	Kim Na-hyun	Kim Kyu-eun / Alex Kang-chan Kam	Lee Ho-jung / Richard Kang-in Kam
2	Lee June-hyoung	~~Park So-youn~~ (withdrew)	Kim Su-yeon / Kim Hyung-tae	
1st alt.	Lee Si-hyeong	Choi Da-bin (added)		

=== World Junior Championships ===
	Men	Ladies	Pairs
1	Cha Jun-hwan	Lim Eun-soo	Kim Su-yeon / Kim Hyung-tae
2	Lee Si-hyeong	~~Kim Ye-lim~~ (withdrew)	
1st alt.	Byun Se-jong	An So-hyun (added)	
2nd alt.	An Geon-hyeong	Kim Ha-nul	

=== World Championships ===
	Men	Ladies	Pairs	Ice dancing
1	Kim Jin-seo	~~Kim Na-hyun~~ (withdrew)	~~Ji Min-ji / Themistocles Leftheris~~ (withdrew)	Yura Min / Alexander Gamelin
1st alt.		Choi Da-bin (added)		
2nd alt.		Son Suh-hyun		
