= Kim Su-yeon =

South Korean pair skater (born 2001)

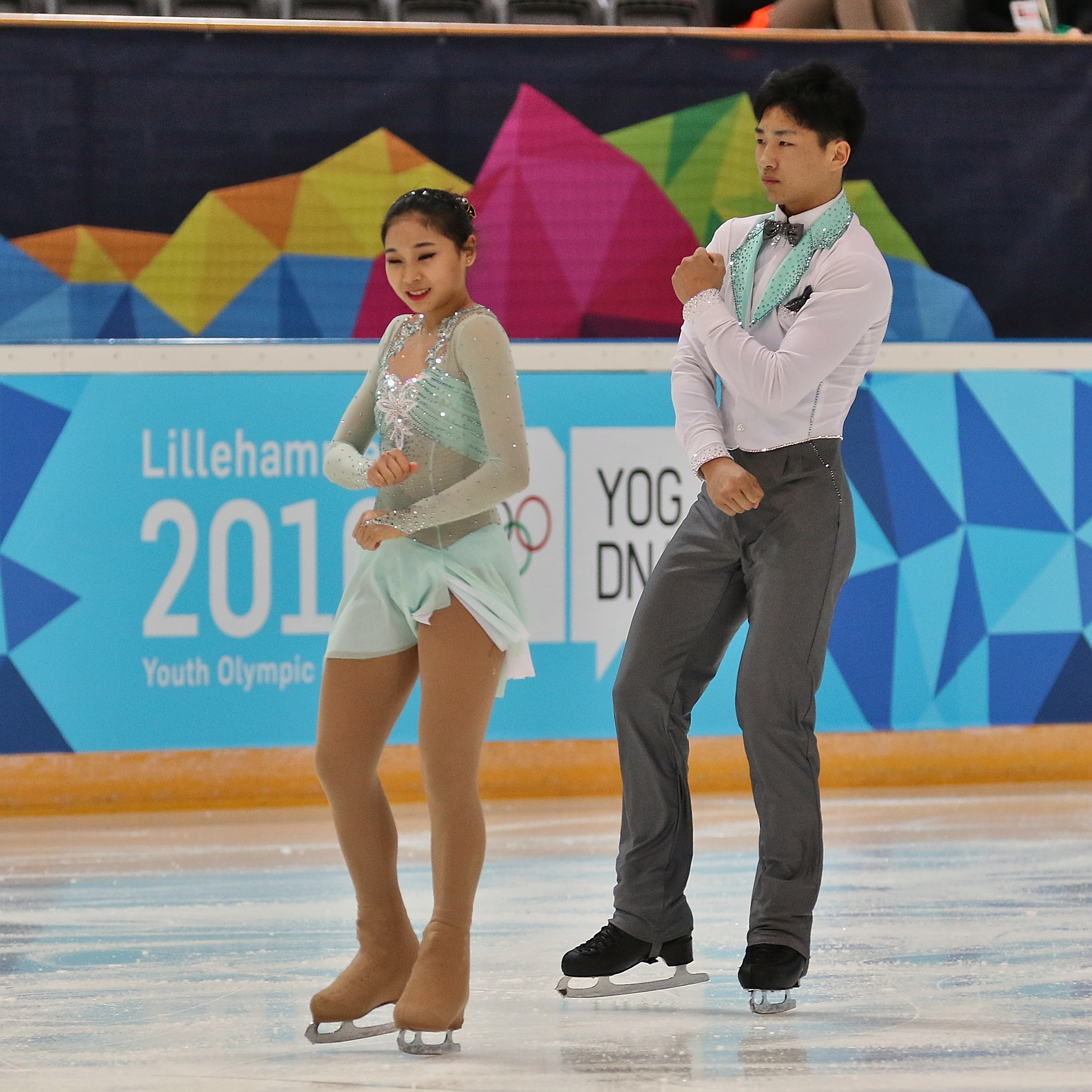
- The Kim siblings at the 2016 Winter Youth Olympics

Personal information
- Native name: 김수연
- Born: April 24, 2001 (age 25) Gwacheon, South Korea
- Home town: Incheon, South Korea
- Height: 1.53 m (5 ft 0 in)

Figure skating career
- Country: South Korea
- Partner: Kim Hyung-tae
- Coach: Chung Bo-kyung, Mariusz Siudek
- Skating club: Incheon
- Began skating: 2010

Kim Su-yeon (Korean: 김수연; born April 24, 2001) is a South Korean pair skater. With her brother, Kim Hyung-tae, she is the 2017 Asian Open Figure Skating Trophy champion, the 2017 Toruń Cup silver medalist and the 2017 South Korean national silver medalist. They competed at the 2017 Four Continents Championships.

== Career ==
Kim Su-yeon began learning to skate in 2010. She and her brother, Kim Hyung-tae, started competing as a pair in the 2015–2016 season. Their international debut came in February 2016 at the Winter Youth Olympics in Hamar, Norway. The pair finished 8th at the event.

The Kim siblings debuted on the Junior Grand Prix series in September 2016, placing 13th in Ostrava, Czech Republic, and 8th in Saransk, Russia. Making their senior debut, they finished 7th at the 2016 CS Ondrej Nepela Memorial a couple of weeks later. In early January 2017, the pair obtained the silver medal at the South Korean Championships, having placed third in the short program and first in the free skate. Later in the same month, they received their first senior international medal, winning silver at the Toruń Cup in Toruń, Poland. In February, the siblings competed at their first ISU Championship — the 2017 Four Continents Championships in Gangneung, South Korea. They finished 12th at the event.

== Programs ==
(with Kim Hyung-tae)

Season	Short program	Free skating	Exhibition
2017–2018	Queen medley: Another One Bites the Dust; We Will Rock You	The Beatles medley: Girl; Hey Jude	Faded by Alan Walker (feat. Iselin Solheim); Game of Thrones by Ramin Djawadi
2016–2017	Game of Thrones by Ramin Djawadi	Tree of Life (from Expo 2015 Milan)	Kung Fu Fighting (from Kung Fu Panda) by Carl Douglas; Game of Thrones by Ramin Djawadi
2015–2016	The Artist Ouverture (from The Artist) by Ludovic Bource	Tree of Life (from Expo 2015 Milan)	

== Competitive highlights ==
CS: Challenger Series; JGP: Junior Grand Prix

With Kim Hyung-tae

International
Event	2015–16	2016–17	2017–18
Four Continents Champ.		12th	
CS Nebelhorn Trophy			15th
CS Nepela Memorial		7th	
Asian Winter Games		4th	
Asian Open			1st
Toruń Cup		2nd	
International: Junior
World Junior Champ.		8th	
Youth Olympics	8th		
JGP Czech Republic		13th	
JGP Russia		8th	
National
South Korean Champ.	1st J	2nd	
TBD = Assigned; J = Junior level

== Detailed results ==
2017–18 season
Date	Event	Level	SP	FS	Total
September 27–30, 2017	2017 CS Nebelhorn Trophy	Senior	16; 40.75	15; 88.25	15; 129.00
August 2–5, 2017	2017 Asian Figure Skating Trophy	Senior	1; 46.30	3; 87.51	1; 133.81
2016–17 season
Date	Event	Level	SP	FS	Total
March 15–19, 2017	2017 World Junior Championships	Junior	9; 49.20	7; 86.09	8; 135.29
February 23–26, 2017	2017 Asian Winter Games	Senior	4; 49.28	4; 100.12	4; 149.40
February 15–19, 2017	2017 ISU Four Continents Championships	Senior	13; 49.88	12; 90.80	12; 140.68
January 10–15, 2017	2017 Toruń Cup	Senior	3; 49.78	2; 96.48	2; 146.26
January 6–8, 2017	2017 South Korean Championships	Senior	3; 44.24	1; 93.38	2; 137.62
September 30–October 2, 2016	2016 CS Ondrej Nepela Memorial	Senior	7; 39.70	7; 78.30	7; 118.00
September 14–17, 2016	2016 JGP Russia	Junior	7; 42.61	10; 67.34	8; 109.95
August 31–September 3, 2016	2016 JGP Czech Republic	Junior	13; 40.20	13; 66.96	13; 107.16
2015–16 season
Date	Event	Level	SP	FS	Total
February 12–21, 2016	2016 Youth Olympics	Junior	8; 35.86	8; 72.67	8; 108.53
January 8–10, 2016	2016 South Korean Championships	Junior	1; 35.35	1; 63.28	1; 98.63
