= Lee Si-hyeong =

South Korean retired figure skater (born 2000)

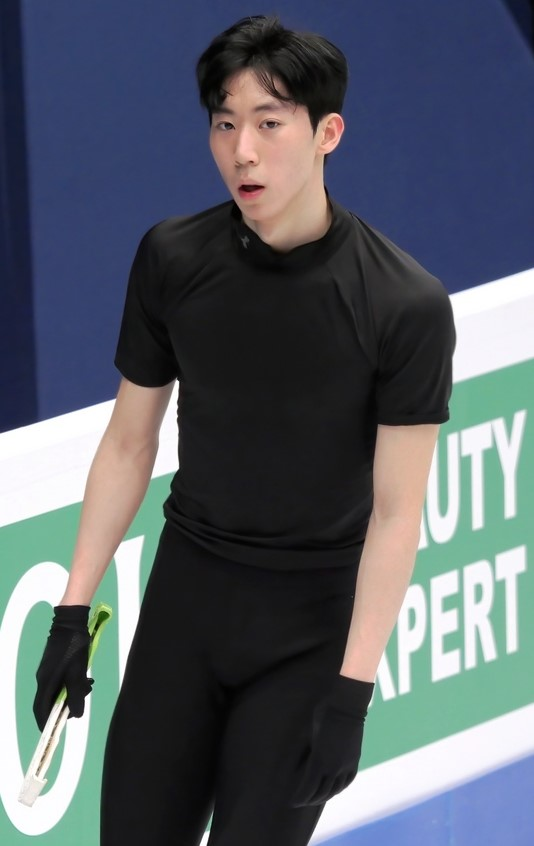
- Lee at the 2022 World Championships

Personal information
- Native name: 이시형
- Full name: Lee Si-hyeong
- Born: December 15, 2000 (age 25) Seoul, South Korea
- Home town: Namyangju, Gyeonggi Province, South Korea
- Height: 1.85 m (6 ft 1 in)

Figure skating career
- Country: South Korea
- Coach: Choi Hyung-kyung; Kim Min-seok; Kim Na-hyun
- Skating club: Korea Skating Union
- Began skating: 2010
- Retired: January 13, 2026

Medal record
South Korean Championships
Silver medal – second place	2020 Uijeongbu	Singles
Silver medal – second place	2021 Uijeongbu	Singles
Silver medal – second place	2022 Uijeongbu	Singles
Silver medal – second place	2024 Uijeongbu	Singles
Bronze medal – third place	2017 Gangneung	Singles
Bronze medal – third place	2019 Seoul	Singles
Bronze medal – third place	2025 Uijeongbu	Singles
World Team Trophy
Silver medal – second place	2023 Tokyo	Team

Lee Si-hyeong (Korean: 이시형; born December 15, 2000) is South Korean retired figure skater. He is the 2022 CS Nebelhorn Trophy silver medalist, and a seven-time South Korean national medalist. He represented his country at the 2022 Winter Olympics.

== Personal life ==
Lee was born on December 15, 2000, in Seoul, South Korea and has a twin sister.

Lee's parents divorced in 2011, leaving his mother, Seung-hee, as the sole provider for him and his sister. She moved Lee, his sister, and grandmother to Namyangju, Gyeonggi Province so that Lee could pursue his figure skating career. The family initially lived in a tiny single-room gosiwon. Seung-hee would work twelve hours per day at a gimbap store to support the family and pay for Lee's skating.

In 2016, Lee's mother tore her rotator cuff ligament from rolling gimbap too hard, making her unable to work. Additionally, she to undergo three surgeries after being diagnosed with thyroid and cervical cancer. As a result, Lee was unable to pay for his training and forced to temporarily stop. After a month of not training, skating fans raised money so that Lee could continue skating. Eventually, The Green Umbrella Children's Foundation learned of Lee's situation and agreed to pay for his training fees.

Lee credits his mother as being the main reason for him being able to achieve results throughout his skating career, saying, "My mother endured constant pain and worked. In the end, it wasn't until she lost the use of her arm that she underwent surgery, and I made a promise then. I said, 'My mother went this far, but I must succeed'. The person who made me who I am today and my role model is my mother. I love my mom."

Lee is a devout Protestant and currently attends Korea University, where he studies sports science.

His figure skating idols are Yuna Kim and Joshua Farris.

== Career ==
=== Early career ===
Lee began figure skating at the age of ten after being inspired by Yuna Kim's victories at the 2009 World Championships and 2010 Vancouver Olympics.

Lee and his family moved him from Seoul to Namyangju, Gyeonggi Province so that Lee could train at the Taereung National Training Center.

As a junior skater, Lee competed at 2013 Asian Open Trophy, where he finished second and then went on to win the bronze medal 2013 Korean Junior Championships.

The following year, Lee won another silver medal at Asian Open Trophy on the junior level. At the 2014 Korean Championships, Lee placed second on the junior level and eighth on the senior level.

At the 2015 Korean Championships, Lee finished sixth.

=== 2015–16 season: Junior international debut ===
Making his international debut, Lee placed ninth and eighth at 2015 Junior Grand United States and 2015 Junior Grand Prix Croatia, respectively. He concluded his season with a fifth-place finish at the 2016 Korean Championships.

=== 2016–17 season: Senior international debut ===
Lee started the 2016–17 figure skating season by placing seventeenth at 2016 Junior Grand Prix France and eighth at 2016 Junior Grand Prix Russia.

Making his senior international debut, Lee also competed at the 2016 CS Ondrej Nepela Memorial, where he placed eleventh.

Lee then went on to win the bronze medal at the 2017 Korean Championships and was selected to compete at the 2017 Four Continents Championships and the 2017 World Junior Championships, where he finished sixteenth at both events.

Following this season, Lee switched coaches from longtime coach, Oh Ji-yeon, to Hong Ye-seul.

=== 2017–18 season ===
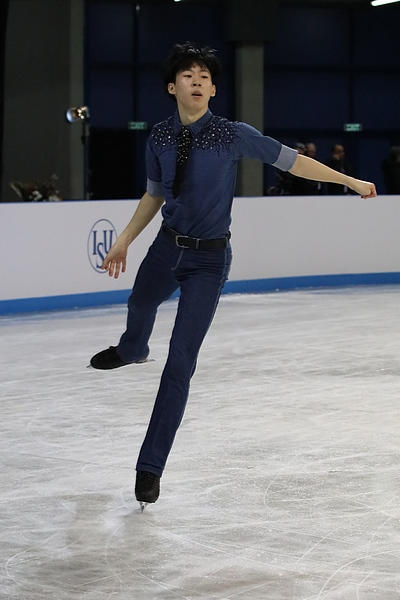
Lee at the 2018 World Junior Championships

Lee began the 2017–18 figure skating season with a ninth and tenth-place finishes at 2017 Junior Grand Prix Belarus and 2017 Junior Grand Prix Italy, respectively.

He was named to the 2018 Four Continents and 2018 World Junior teams, following a fourth-place finish at the 2018 Korean Championships. Lee would go on to place twenty-second and eleventh, respectively, at those events.

Following this season, Lee left coach, Hong Ye-seul to train under Choi Hyung-kyung.

=== 2018–19 season ===
Although assigned to compete at 2018 Junior Grand Prix Canada and 2018 Asian Open Trophy, Lee withdrew from both events. After winning the bronze medal at the 2019 Korean Championships, Lee was assigned to compete at the 2019 Four Continents Championships and the 2019 World Junior Championships. He placed fifteenth at Four Continents and then went on to place twenty-ninth in the short program at Junior Worlds, failing to advance to the free skate segment of the competition.

=== 2019–20 season: Junior Grand Prix silver ===
Lee won his first international figure skating medal, a silver at 2019 Junior Grand Prix Latvia, before finishing sixth at 2019 Junior Grand Prix Croatia. Lee would then go on to finish fifth at 2019 Asian Open Trophy.

Competing at the 2020 South Korean Championships, Lee won the silver medal behind Cha Jun-hwan and was assigned to compete at the 2020 Four Continents Championships, where he finished fourteenth.

=== 2020–21 season ===
Due to the COVID-19 pandemic, Lee only competed at the 2021 Korean Championships, where he won his second consecutive silver.

=== 2021–22 season: Beijing Olympics ===
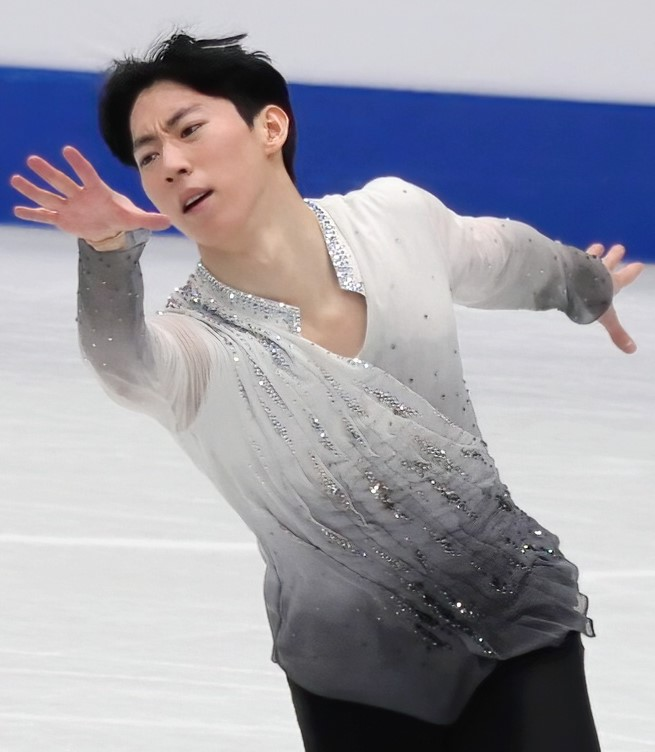
Lee performing his short program at the 2022 World Championships

Cha Jun-hwan's tenth-place finish at the 2021 World Championships earned two spots for men's singles at the 2022 World Championships and provided the opportunity for Korean men's singles skaters to earn a second berth for the 2022 Beijing Olympics at the Nebelhorn Trophy, the final Olympic figure skating qualifying event.

Lee was able to grant that second berth, following his fifth-place finish at the Nebelhorn Trophy. He then went on to finish seventh at 2021 Asian Open Trophy.

After winning the silver medal at the 2022 Korean Championships, Lee was named to the Four Continents, Olympic, and World team for South Korea.

Lee finished seventh at the Four Continents Championships.

Competing at the 2022 Winter Olympics in the men's event, Lee placed twenty-seventh in the short program and failed to advance to the event's free skate segment. Regardless, Lee stated that he was grateful for the "valuable and precious experience."

At the 2022 World Championships, Lee scored a personal best in the short program, finishing thirteenth in that segment of the competition but dropped to eighteenth overall following an error-ridden free skate. During those championships, Lee expressed his support for Ukraine following Russia's invasion by having a Ukrainian flag patch pinned to his jacket.

=== 2022–23 season: Grand Prix debut ===
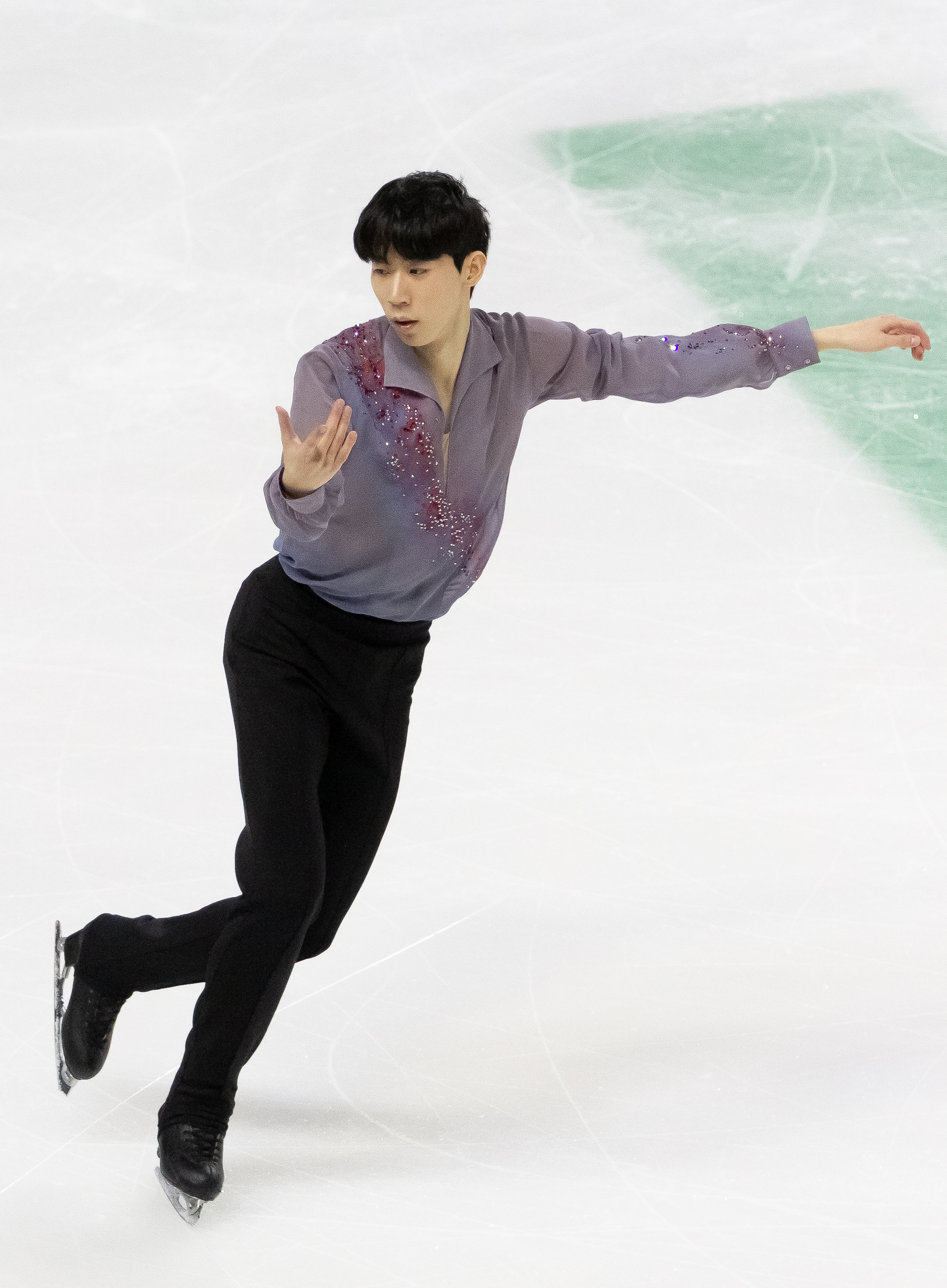
Lee performing his free skate at the 2023 Four Continents Championships

Lee began the 2022–23 figure skating season with a silver medal win at the 2022 CS Nebelhorn Trophy, where he scored a new personal best in the short program.

Competing at his first senior ISU Grand Prix event, Lee competed at 2022 Grand Prix de France where he finished in fourth-place, scoring a personal best in the free skate and placed second in that segment of the competition. He would go on to describe this event as one of the "highlights of his career so far" in an interview following the season.

Lee was selected to compete at the 2023 Winter University Games and 2023 Four Continents Championships, after finishing fourth at the 2023 Korean Championships. He would place sixth at both of these events.

Lee would then go on to participate at 2023 World Team Trophy following the qualification of Team South Korea for the first time in the event's history. Lee earned the team a total of four points from his tenth-place short program and twelfth-place free skate. However, with the team's combined scored, South Korea managed to win the team silver medal overall.

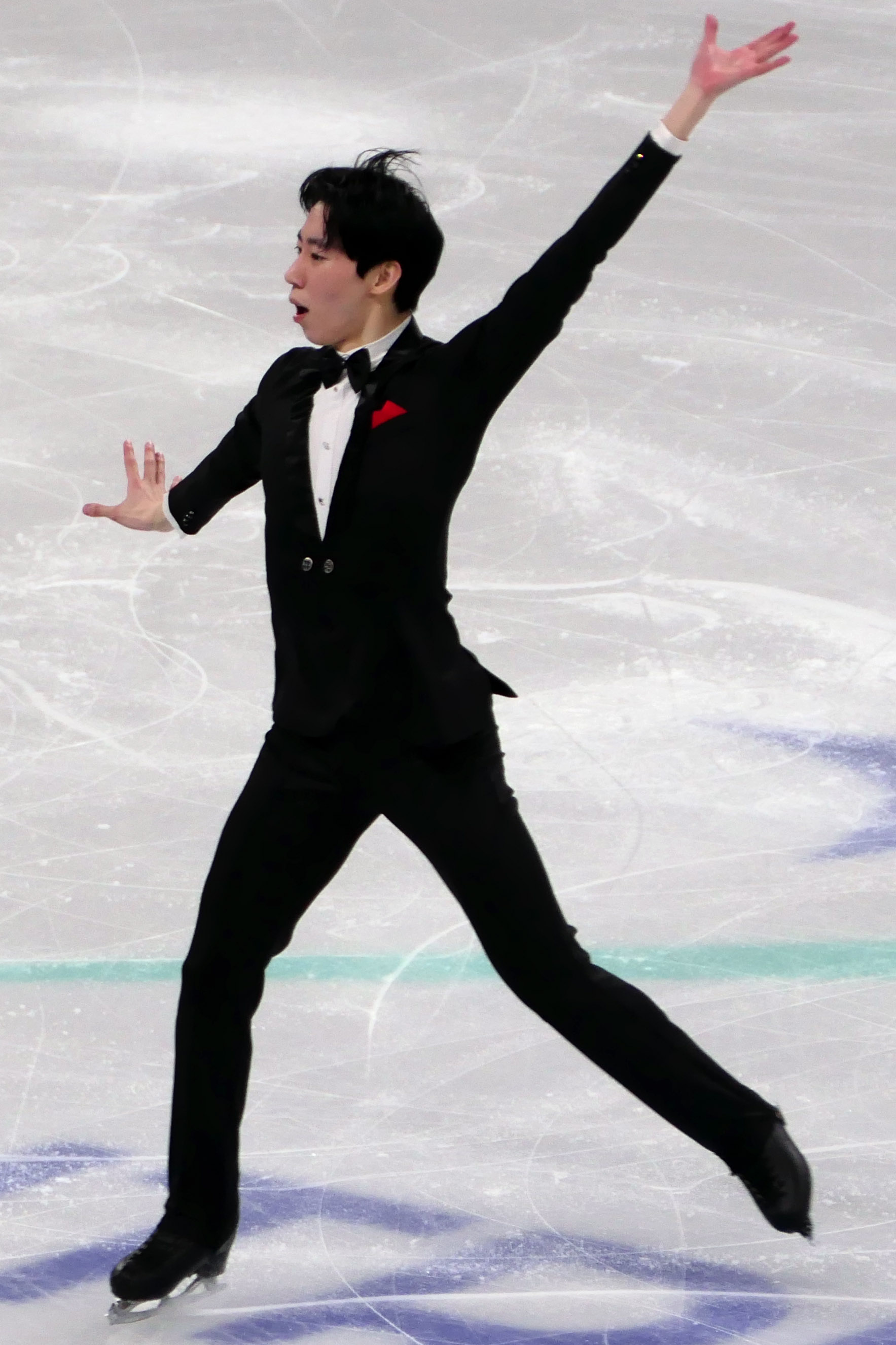
Lee performing during his short program at the 2024 World Championships

=== 2023–24 season: Injury struggles ===
Having attended the 2015 Four Continents Championships in Seoul, South Korea, Lee was inspired by Joshua Farris's "Give Me Love" short program and decided to have Farris choreograph his 2023–24 free program. He specifically asked Farris to choreograph a program in a similar style to what Farris would have skated to.

Lee announced his withdrawal from his Challenger assignments due to a ligament tear. Making his season debut on the Grand Prix at the 2023 Cup of China, he finished eighth. Lee subsequently withdrew from the 2023 NHK Trophy.

At the national Ranking Competition, Lee came in ninth-place and ultimately wasn't selected to compete at the 2024 Four Continents Championships as a result. He followed this up by winning his fourth national silver medal at the 2024 South Korean Championships and was named to the 2024 World team. Lee placed twenty-fourth at the World Championships.

=== 2024–25 season ===
Lee began the season by winning the 2024 Asian Open Trophy. He then competed at the 2024 Korean Universiade and Asian Games Qualifiers, where he finished third. With this result, Lee was selected to represent South Korea at the 2025 Winter World University Games.

In late November, Lee would compete at the annual South Korean Ranking Competition, where he won the bronze medal. With this result, Lee was named to the 2025 Four Continents Championships team. One month later, he won the bronze medal at the 2025 South Korean Championships, earning a spot on the 2025 World team.

In mid-January, Lee finished ninth at the 2025 Winter World University Games in Turin, Italy. One month later, although set to compete at the 2025 Four Continents Championships in Seoul, Lee was forced to withdraw on the day of the short program after dislocating his left shoulder that resulted from a hard fall he took during one of the practice sessions. He subsequently withdrew from the 2025 World Championships due to this injury.

=== 2025–26 season: Final competitive season ===
Lee opened his season by competing on the 2025–26 Challenger Series, finishing ninth at the 2025 CS Kinoshita Group Cup, fourth at the 2025 CS Denis Ten Memorial Challenge, and sixth at the 2025 CS Trialeti Trophy.

In January, he finished fifth at the 2026 South Korean Championships. Following the event, he announced his retirement from competitive figure skating.

== Skating technique ==
Lee is known for primarily performing his jumps with both arms over his head, which he says helps him find balance in the air.

== Programs ==
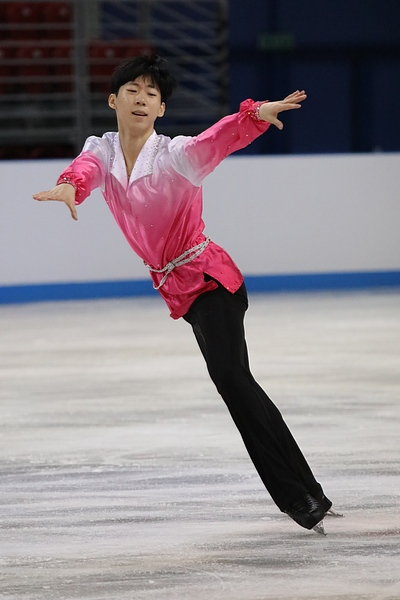
Lee at the 2018 Junior Worlds

Season	Short program	Free skating	Exhibition
2025–2026	All I Ask of You (from Phantom of the Opera) by Andrew Lloyd Webber performed by Josh Groban & Kelly Clarkson choreo. by Lee Si-hyeong	Le Boléro by Maurice Ravel performed by Prequell choreo. by Shin Yea-ji	
2024–2025	All I Ask of You (from Phantom of the Opera) by Andrew Lloyd Webber performed by Josh Groban & Kelly Clarkson choreo. by Lee Si-hyeong	Nureyev (from The White Crow) by Ilan Eshkeri; Ballet of an Immortal Star by Karl Hugo choreo. by Shin Yea-ji	
2023–2024	Feeling Good by Anthony Newley & Leslie Bricusse performed by Michael Bublé choreo. by Shin Yea-ji; Bitter Sweet Symphony by The Verve performed by The Crown choreo. by Katherine Hill, Benjamin Agosto	Cyrano; I Love You; Your Name; Wherever I Fall, Pt. 2 by Aaron Dessner, Bryce Dessner, & Peter Dinklage choreo. by Shin Yea-ji; Cloud by Elias choreo. by Joshua Farris	Bitter Sweet Symphony by The Verve performed by The Crown choreo. by Katherine Hill, Benjamin Agosto
2022–2023	Feeling Good by Anthony Newley & Leslie Bricusse performed by Michael Bublé choreo. by Shin Yea-ji	Cyrano; I Love You; Your Name; Wherever I Fall, Pt. 2 by Aaron Dessner, Bryce Dessner, & Peter Dinklage choreo. by Shin Yea-ji	All of Me by Michael Bublé choreo. by Shin Yea-ji
2021–2022	Prince Igor by Alexander Borodin choreo. by Shin Yea-ji	Carmen Suite by Rodion Shchedrin choreo. by Shin Yea-ji	
2020–2021	Elena & Lila; Last Days by Max Richter choreo. by Shin Yea-ji	Carmen Suite by Rodion Shchedrin choreo. by Shin Yea-ji	
2019–2020	Elena & Lila; Last Days by Max Richter choreo. by Shin Yea-ji	Love Never Dies: Prologue; Beneath a Moonless Sky; Why Does She Love Me?; Entr'acte by Andrew Lloyd Webber, Ramin Karimloo choreo. by Alex Chang	
2018–2019	The Name's Bond... James Bond (from Casino Royale) by David Arnold; James Bond Theme (Moby's Re-Version) by Moby choreo. by Pasquale Camerlengo	Love Never Dies: Prologue; Beneath a Moonless Sky; Why Does She Love Me?; Entr'acte by Andrew Lloyd Webber, Ramin Karimloo choreo. by Alex Chang	The Prayer by David Foster, Carole Bayer Sager, Alberto Testa, Tony Renis performed by Celine Dion and Andrea Bocelli choreo. by Alex Chang
2017–2018	The Prayer by David Foster, Carole Bayer Sager, Alberto Testa, Tony Renis performed by Celine Dion and Andrea Bocelli choreo. by Alex Chang	Take Me to Church; From Eden by Hozier; Nausicaa of the Valley of the Wind by Joe Hisaishi choreo. by Tom Dickson	Greased Lightnin' by Jim Jacobs, Warren Casey performed by Glee cast
2016–2017	Another Bear (from Finding Neverland) by Jan A. P. Kaczmarek & Nick Ingman; La mascarade (from Mozart, l'opéra rock by Dove Attia & François Castello choreo. by Alex Chang, Shin Na-hee	Take Me to Church; From Eden by Hozier choreo. by Alex Chang, Shin Na-hee	For Lisa (Für Elise) original by Ludwig van Beethoven adapted by The Brian Setzer Orchestra choreo. by Oh Ji-yeon
2015–2016	For Lisa (Für Elise) original by Ludwig van Beethoven adapted by The Brian Setzer Orchestra choreo. by Oh Ji-yeon	Let Us Quest! by Steve Jablonsky choreo. by Oh Ji-yeon	

== Competitive highlights ==
- GP – Event of the ISU Grand Prix Series
- JGP – Event of the ISU Junior Grand Prix Series
- CS – Event of the ISU Challenger Series
- TBD – Assigned
- WD – Withdrew from competition
- Medals at team events are awarded for the team results only. Individual placements at team events are listed in parentheses.

Competition placements at senior level
Season	2013–14	2014–15	2015–16	2016–17	2017–18	2018–19	2019–20	2020–21	2021–22	2022–23	2023–24	2024–25	2025–26
Winter Olympics									27th				
World Championships									18th		24th		
Four Continents Championships				16th	22nd	15th	14th		7th	6th		WD	
South Korean Championships	8th	6th	5th	3rd	4th	3rd	2nd	2nd	2nd	4th	2nd	3rd	5th
World Team Trophy										11th (1st)			
GP Cup of China											8th		
GP France										4th			
GP NHK Trophy											WD		
CS Asian Open Trophy							5th						
CS Budapest Trophy											WD		
CS Denis Ten Memorial													4th
CS Finlandia Trophy											WD		
CS Kinoshita Group Cup													9th
CS Nebelhorn Trophy									5th	2nd			
CS Nepela Memorial				11th									
CS Trialeti Trophy													6th
CS Trophée Métropole												10th	
Asian Open Trophy									7th			1st	
Winter World University Games										6th		9th	

Competition placements at junior level
Season	2012–13	2015–16	2016–17	2017–18	2018–19	2019–20
World Junior Championships			16th	11th	29th	11th
South Korean Championships	3rd					
JGP Belarus				9th		
JGP Canada					WD	
JGP Croatia		8th				6th
JGP France			17th			
JGP Italy				10th		
JGP Latvia						2nd
JGP Russia			8th			
JGP United States		9th				

== Detailed results ==
ISU personal best scores in the +5/-5 GOE System
Segment	Type	Score	Event
Total	TSS	242.62	2022 Grand Prix de France
Short program	TSS	86.78	2022 CS Nebelhorn Trophy
Short program	TES	48.54	2022 CS Nebelhorn Trophy
Short program	PCS	38.24	2022 CS Nebelhorn Trophy
Free skating	TSS	166.08	2022 Grand Prix de France
Free skating	TES	90.09	2022 Grand Prix de France
Free skating	PCS	77.92	2025 CS Denis Ten Memorial Challenge

=== Senior level ===
Results in the 2013–14 season
Date	Event	SP		FS		Total	
Date	Event	P	Score	P	Score	P	Score
Jan 3–5, 2014	(South Korea) 2014 South Korean Championships	8	35.99	8	81.25	8	117.24

Results in the 2014–15 season
Date	Event	SP		FS		Total	
Date	Event	P	Score	P	Score	P	Score
Jan 7–9, 2015	(South Korea) 2015 South Korean Championships	6	43.88	5	106.26	6	150.14

Results in the 2015–16 season
Date	Event	SP		FS		Total	
Date	Event	P	Score	P	Score	P	Score
Jan 8–10, 2016	(South Korea) 2016 South Korean Championships	5	51.31	4	123.26	5	174.57

Results in the 2016–17 season
Date	Event	SP		FS		Total	
Date	Event	P	Score	P	Score	P	Score
Sep 29 – Oct 1, 2016	(Slovakia) 2016 CS Ondrej Nepela Memorial	14	52.10	11	101.34	11	153.44
Jan 6–8, 2017	(South Korea) 2017 South Korean Championships	%	58.46	3	131.45	3	189.91
Feb 15–19, 2017	(South Korea) 2017 Four Continents Championships	17	65.40	17	130.32	16	195.72

Results in the 2017–18 season
Date	Event	SP		FS		Total	
Date	Event	P	Score	P	Score	P	Score
Jan 5–7, 2018	(South Korea) 2018 South Korean Championships	4	70.46	4	138.03	4	208.49
Jan 22–28, 2018	(Taiwan) 2018 Four Continents Championships	20	62.65	22	114.42	22	177.07

Results in the 2018–19 season
Date	Event	SP		FS		Total	
Date	Event	P	Score	P	Score	P	Score
Jan 11–13, 2019	(South Korea) 2019 South Korean Championships	4	62.19	3	128.73	3	190.92
Feb 7–10, 2019	(United States) 2019 Four Continents Championships	21	56.03	13	127.95	15	183.98

Results in the 2019–20 season
Date	Event	SP		FS		Total	
Date	Event	P	Score	P	Score	P	Score
Oct 30 – Nov 3, 2019	(China) 2019 CS Asian Open Figure Skating Trophy	3	71.94	6	119.24	5	191.18
Jan 3–5, 2020	(South Korea) 2020 South Korean Championships	3	77.72	2	144.48	2	215.87
Feb 4–9, 2020	(South Korea) 2020 Four Continents Championships	16	67.00	13	136.50	14	203.50

Results in the 2020–21 season
Date	Event	SP		FS		Total	
Date	Event	P	Score	P	Score	P	Score
Feb 24–26, 2021	(South Korea) 2021 South Korean Championships	2	79.13	2	148.50	2	227.63

Results in the 2021–22 season
Date	Event	SP		FS		Total	
Date	Event	P	Score	P	Score	P	Score
Sep 22–25, 2021	(Germany) 2021 CS Nebelhorn Trophy	7	79.95	4	149.19	5	229.14
Oct 13–17, 2021	(China) 2021 Asian Open Trophy	8	66.09	4	143.55	7	209.64
Jan 7–9, 2022	(South Korea) 2022 South Korean Championships	2	73.68	2	167.16	2	240.84
Jan 18–23, 2022	(Estonia) 2022 Four Continents Championships	6	79.13	11	144.05	7	223.18
Feb 8–10, 2022	(China) 2022 Winter Olympics	27	66.59	-	-	27	65.69
Mar 22–28, 2022	(France) 2022 World Championships	13	86.35	18	138.71	18	225.06

Results in the 2022–23 season
Date	Event	SP		FS		Total	
Date	Event	P	Score	P	Score	P	Score
Sep 21–24, 2022	(France) 2022 CS Nebelhorn Trophy	2	86.78	2	148.93	2	235.71
Nov 4–6, 2022	2022 Grand Prix de France	7	76.54	2	166.08	4	242.62
Jan 5–8, 2023	(South Korea) 2023 South Korean Championships	2	81.97	5	148.77	4	230.74
Jan 13–15, 2023	(United States) 2023 Winter World University Games	5	75.17	6	143.58	6	218.75
Feb 7–12, 2023	(United States) 2023 Four Continents Championships	14	70.38	6	157.41	6	227.79
Apr 13–16, 2023	(Japan) 2023 World Team Trophy	10	77.24	12	124.82	11 (2)	202.06

Results in the 2023–24 season
Date	Event	SP		FS		Total	
Date	Event	P	Score	P	Score	P	Score
Nov 10–12, 2023	2023 Cup of China	9	74.43	8	134.70	8	209.13
Jan 5–7, 2024	(South Korea) 2024 South Korean Championships	2	85.06	3	155.99	2	241.05
Mar 18–24, 2024	(Canada) 2024 World Championships	24	73.23	24	134.36	24	207.59

Results in the 2024–25 season
Date	Event	SP		FS		Total	
Date	Event	P	Score	P	Score	P	Score
Sep 2–6, 2024	(Hong Kong) 2024 Asian Open Trophy	1	86.49	3	147.59	1	234.08
Oct 16–20, 2024	(France) 2024 CS Trophée Métropole Nice Côte d'Azur	6	77.10	10	129.18	10	206.28
Jan 2–5, 2025	(South Korea) 2025 South Korean Championships	2	81.42	3	160.27	3	241.69
Jan 16–18, 2025	(Italy) 2025 Winter World University Games	7	73.60	13	129.50	9	203.10

Results in the 2025–26 season
Date	Event	SP		FS		Total	
Date	Event	P	Score	P	Score	P	Score
Sep 5–7, 2025	(Japan) 2025 CS Kinoshita Group Cup	13	62.86	2	155.70	9	218.56
Oct 1–4, 2025	(Kazakhstan) 2025 CS Denis Ten Memorial Challenge	4	78.81	4	163.71	4	242.52
Oct 8–11, 2025	(Georgia (country)) 2025 CS Trialeti Trophy	7	73.22	6	144.55	6	217.77
Jan 3–6, 2026	(South Korea) 2026 South Korean Championships	5	78.78	5	154.52	5	233.30

=== Junior level ===
2019–20 season
Date	Event	Level	SP	FS	Total
March 4–7, 2020	2020 World Junior Championships	Junior	15; 71.61	8; 129.88	11; 201.49
February 4–9, 2020	2020 Four Continents Championships	Senior	16; 67.00	13; 136.50	14; 203.50
January 4–5, 2020	2020 South Korean Championships	Senior	3; 77.72	2; 153.22	2; 231.04
Oct. 30 – Nov. 3, 2019	2019 CS Asian Open Trophy	Senior	3; 71.94	6; 119.24	5; 191.18
September 25–28, 2019	2019 JGP Croatia	Junior	7; 66.76	2; 144.82	6; 211.58
September 4–7, 2019	2019 JGP Latvia	Junior	2; 77.30	2; 141.01	2; 218.31
2018–19 season
March 4–10, 2019	2019 World Junior Championships	Junior	29; 54.04	-	29; 54.04
February 7–10, 2019	2019 Four Continents Championships	Senior	21; 56.03	13; 127.95	15; 183.98
January 11–13, 2018	2019 South Korean Championships	Senior	4; 62.19	3; 128.73	3; 190.92
2017–18 season
Date	Event	Level	SP	FS	Total
March 5–11, 2018	2018 World Junior Championships	Junior	5; 70.70	11; 124.15	11; 194.85
January 22–27, 2018	2018 Four Continents Championships	Senior	20; 62.65	22; 114.42	22; 177.07
January 5–7, 2018	2018 South Korean Championships	Senior	4; 70.46	4; 138.03	4; 208.49
October 11–14, 2017	2017 JGP Italy	Junior	11; 54.17	8; 121.99	10; 176.16
September 20–23, 2017	2017 JGP Belarus	Junior	8; 60.64	10; 96.67	9; 157.31
2016–17 season
Date	Event	Level	SP	FS	Total
March 13–19, 2017	2017 World Junior Championships	Junior	15; 67.51	16; 119.16	16; 186.67
February 14–19, 2017	2017 Four Continents Championships	Senior	17; 65.40	17; 130.32	16; 195.72
January 6–8, 2017	2017 South Korean Championships	Senior	5; 58.46	3; 131.45	3; 189.91
Sept. 29 – Oct. 1, 2016	2016 CS Ondrej Nepela Memorial	Senior	14; 52.10	11; 101.34	11; 153.44
September 14–17, 2016	2016 JGP Russia	Junior	8; 55.11	6; 119.17	8; 174.28
August 24–27, 2016	2016 JGP France	Junior	19; 41.78	16; 88.48	17; 130.26
2015–16 season
Date	Event	Level	SP	FS	Total
January 8–10, 2016	2016 South Korean Championships	Senior	5; 51.31	4; 123.26	5; 174.57
October 7–10, 2015	2015 JGP Croatia	Junior	6; 61.13	8; 105.52	8; 166.65
September 2–5, 2015	2015 JGP United States	Junior	10; 55.15	8; 110.63	9; 165.78
2014–15 season
Date	Event	Level	SP	FS	Total
January 7–9, 2015	2015 South Korean Championships	Senior	6; 43.88	5; 106.26	6; 150.14
2013–14 season
Date	Event	Level	SP	FS	Total
January 3–5, 2014	2014 South Korean Championships	Senior	8	8	8; 117.24
August 8–11, 2013	2013 Asian Open Trophy	Novice			2
2012–13 season
Date	Event	Level	SP	FS	Total
January 4–6, 2013	2013 South Korean Championships	Junior			3
August 7–12, 2012	2012 Asian Open Trophy	Novice			2
