= Kim Na-hyun =

South Korean figure skater (born 2000)

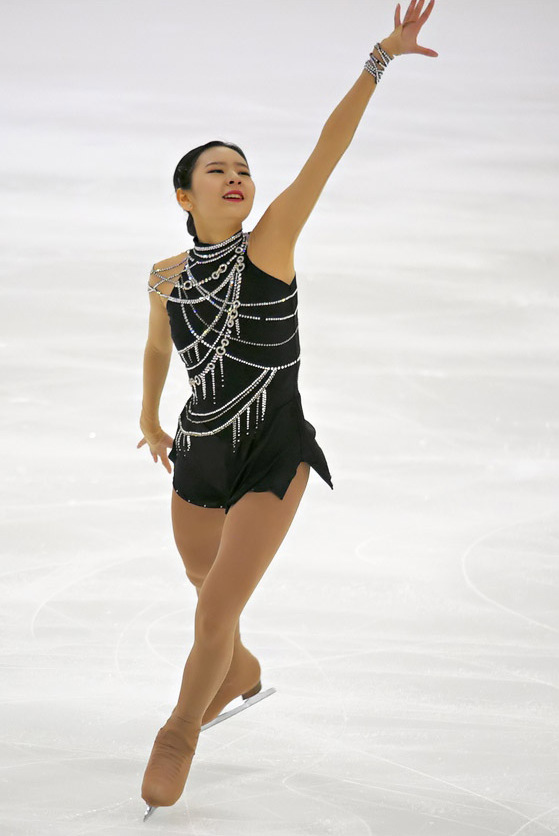
- Kim at the 2017 Lombardia Trophy

Personal information
- Native name: 김나현
- Born: January 3, 2000 (age 26) Seoul, South Korea
- Home town: Gwacheon, Gyeonggi Province, South Korea
- Height: 1.59 m (5 ft 2 1/2 in)

Figure skating career
- Country: South Korea
- Coach: Choi Hyung-kyung
- Began skating: 2006
- Retired: 2019

- Kim Na-hyun
- Hangul: 김나현
- Hanja: 金 娜玄
- RR: Gim Nahyeon
- MR: Kim Nahyŏn

Kim Na-hyun (Korean: 김나현; born January 3, 2000) is a retired South Korean figure skater. She is the 2016 CS Lombardia Trophy silver medalist and has finished in the top ten at two ISU Championships.

== Career ==
=== Early career ===
Kim began learning to skate in 2006. Her ISU Junior Grand Prix (JGP) debut came in August 2013. After placing fifth in Riga, Latvia, she had the same result the following month in Gdańsk, Poland. Ranked 14th in the short program, she qualified to the free skate at the 2014 World Junior Championships in Sofia, Bulgaria, and went on to finish tenth overall.

Kim's first senior international was the 2016 Four Continents Championships in Taipei, Taiwan; she finished 9th after ranking 8th in both segments.

=== 2016–17 season ===
In September 2016, Kim won the silver medal at a Challenger Series event, the Lombardia Trophy in Bergamo, Italy. Making her Grand Prix debut, Kim placed 8th at the 2016 Skate Canada International in late October.

In January 2017, she was awarded the bronze medal at the South Korean Championships. At the 2017 Four Continents Championships in Gangneung, South Korea, she placed 17th in the short program but withdrew before the next segment. She had inflammation in both ankles and pain in her thigh. A week later, she decided to withdraw from the 2017 World Championships.

=== 2017–18 season ===
Kim began the season by competing at the 2017 CS Lombardia Trophy, where she finished 25th. She went on to compete at the 2018 South Korean Championships, placing fourteenth.

=== 2018–19 season ===
Kim's sole competition appearance was at the 2019 Winter Universiade, where she finished 21st. She presumably retired following that season.

== Post-competitive career ==
Following the end of her competitive career, Kim began coaching alongside her former coach, Choi Hyung-kyung at the Gwacheon Ice Rink. Her students have included:

- Choi Ha-bin
- Cha Young-hyun
- Han Hee-sue
- Huh Ji-yu
- Hwang Jeon-gyul
- Kim Chae-yeon
- Kim Hyun-gyeom
- Kim Seo-young
- Kim Ye-lim
- Kim Yu-jae
- Kim Yu-seong
- Lee Hyo-rin
- Lee Jae-keun
- Lee Si-hyeong
- Song Si-woo
- Wi Seo-yeong
- Youn Seo-jin
- Yu Na-yeong

== Programs ==
Season	Short program	Free skating	Exhibition
2017–18	I Will Always Love You by Whitney Houston choreo by Shin Yea-ji	Scheherazade by Nikolai Rimsky-Korsakov choreo by Shin Yea-ji	Samsara by Tungevaag & Raaban (feat. Emila) choreo by Shin Yea-ji
2016–17	I Will Always Love You by Whitney Houston choreo by Shin Yea-ji	House of Flying Daggers by Shigeru Umebayashi choreo by Shin Yea-ji	
2015–16	O Canto do Cisne Negro (Song of the Black Swan) by Heitor Villa-Lobos; Dumky by Antonín Dvořák performed by Jascha Heifetz, Ahn Trio choreo by Shin Yea-ji	The Great Gatsby by Craig Armstrong; Young and Beautiful by Lana Del Rey choreo by Shin Yea-ji	
2014–15	Scene d'amour by Sarah Brightman	Sabrina (1995 film) by John Williams	
2013–14	Malagueña by Ernesto Lecuona	Sabrina (1995 film) by John Williams	

== Competitive highlights ==
GP: Grand Prix; CS: Challenger Series; JGP: Junior Grand Prix

International
Event	11–12	12–13	13–14	14–15	15–16	16–17	17–18	18-19
Worlds						WD		
Four Continents					9th	WD		
GP Skate Canada						8th	WD	
CS Autumn Classic						6th		
CS Lombardia						2nd	25th	
Asian Games						13th		
Winter Universiade								21st
International: Junior, Novice
Junior Worlds			10th					
JGP Czech Rep.				6th				
JGP Estonia				5th				
JGP Latvia			5th					
JGP Poland			5th		6th			
JGP USA					8th			
Asian Trophy	7th N		4th J	5th J				
National
South Korean	1st J	6th	6th	17th	11th	3rd	14th	
Levels: N = Advanced novice; J = Junior. WD = Withdrew

== Detailed results ==
=== Senior ===
**2018–19 season**
Date	Event	SP	FS	Total
March 6–9, 2019	2019 Winter Universiade	23; 36.14	19; 80.32	21; 116.46
**2017–18 season**
Date	Event	SP	FS	Total
January 5–7, 2018	2018 South Korean Championships	10; 53.83	15; 93.44	14; 147.27
September 13–16, 2017	2017 CS Lombardia Trophy	19; 44.38	27; 74.48	25; 118.86
**2016–17 season**
Date	Event	SP	FS	Total
February 23–26, 2017	2017 Asian Winter Games	13; 40.80	13; 67.97	13; 108.77
February 15–19, 2017	2017 Four Continents Championships	17; 45.95	WD	WD
January 6–8, 2017	2017 South Korean Championships	3; 62.87	5; 118.91	3; 181.78
October 28–30, 2016	2016 Skate Canada International	7; **60.46**	9; 104.02	8; 164.48
September 28 – October 1, 2016	2016 CS Autumn Classic	3; 60.38	6; 100.53	6; 160.91
September 7–11, 2016	2016 CS Lombardia Trophy	3; 59.58	1; **117.69**	2; **177.27**
**2015–16 season**
Date	Event	SP	FS	Total
February 16–21, 2016	2016 Four Continents Championships	8; 58.40	8; 112.30	9; 170.70
January 8–10, 2016	2016 South Korean Championships	17; 49.37	8; 102.91	11; 152.28

=== Junior ===
**2015–16 season**
Date	Event	Level	SP	FS	Total
September 23–27, 2015	2015 JGP Poland	Junior	5; 50.35	6; 95.90	6; 146.25
September 2–6, 2015	2015 JGP United States	Junior	8; 49.62	8; 88.07	8; 137.69
**2014–15 season**
Date	Event	Level	SP	FS	Total
January 7–9, 2015	2015 South Korean Championships	Senior	9; 50.68	20; 80.52	17; 131.20
September 24–28, 2014	2014 JGP Estonia	Junior	9; 46.15	4; 97.49	5; 143.64
September 3–7, 2014	2014 JGP Czech Republic	Junior	6; 49.39	9; 87.99	6; 137.38
August 6–10, 2014	2014 Asian Open Trophy	Junior	6; 37.54	4; 92.82	5; 130.36
**2013–14 season**
Date	Event	Level	SP	FS	Total
March 10–16, 2014	2014 World Junior Championships	Junior	14; 47.79	10; 96.42	10; 144.21
January 3–5, 2014	2014 South Korean Championships	Senior	8; 51.04	5; 98.92	6; 149.96
September 19–21, 2013	2013 JGP Poland	Junior	3; 51.01	5; 86.19	5; 137.20
August 29–31, 2013	2013 JGP Latvia	Junior	8; 47.29	5; 95.83	5; 143.12
August 8–11, 2013	2013 Asian Open Trophy	Junior	4; 44.61	4; 88.66	4; 133.27
**2012–13 season**
Date	Event	Level	SP	FS	Total
January 4–6, 2013	2013 South Korean Championships	Senior	6; 48.17	6; 89.81	6; 137.98
**2011–12 season**
Date	Event	Level	SP	FS	Total
January 6–8, 2012	2012 South Korean Championships	Junior	10; 38.43	1; 79.92	1; 118.35
August 22–26, 2011	2011 Asian Open Trophy	Novice	12; 23.55	5; 44.82	7; 68.37

- Personal bests highlighted in **bold**.
