= Kim Kyu-eun =

South Korean pair skater (born 1999)

Kim Kyu-Eun
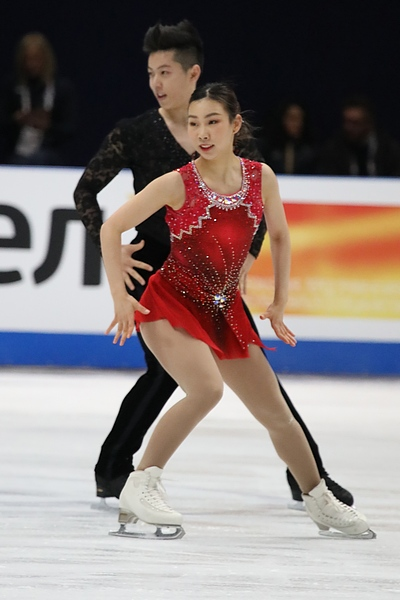
- Kim/Kam at the 2018 World Championships

Personal information
- Native name: 김규은
- Full name: Kyu-eun Kim
- Born: June 27, 1999 (age 27) Seoul, Korea
- Home town: Seoul

Figure skating career
- Country: South Korea
- Partner: Alex Kang-chan Kam
- Coach: Bruno Marcotte

Kim Kyu-eun (Korean: 김규은; born June 27, 1999) is a South Korean pair skater. With her skating partner, Alex Kang-chan Kam, she competed in the free skate at the 2017 Four Continents Championships and participated in the 2018 Winter Olympics.

== Career ==
=== 2013–14 season ===
Kim debuted on the ISU Junior Grand Prix (JGP) series in the 2013–14 season. She competed at 2013 JGP Tallinn, placing 9th with a total score of 132.45 points.

=== 2014–15 season ===
Early in the 2014–15 season, Kim placed 4th at the Asian Open Trophy held in Taipei, Taiwan, her first senior international competition. She competed at a second ISU competition, 2014 JGP Pokal der Blauen Schwerter, placing 15th with total score 106.72. A month later, she placed 7th in senior ladies at the 2014 CS Ice Challenge held in Graz, Austria.

=== 2016–2018 ===
Since 2016 till 2018, Kim competed in pair skating with Alex Kang-chan Kam. The pair's international debut took place in early February 2016 at the Sarajevo Open. The following season, they moved up to the senior level, placing 5th at the 2016 CS Autumn Classic International, and participated in the 2017 Four Continents Championships. During the 2017–2018 season, they participated in the 2018 Winter Olympics and in the 2018 World Figure Skating Championships.

During the 2018–2019 season, Kim trained with Maxime Deschamps to represent South Korea, but their partnership got dissolved after a few months.

== Programs ==
=== With Kam ===
Season	Short program	Free skating
2016–2018	Historia de un Amor	The Impossible Dream

=== Single skating ===
Season	Short program	Free skating
2015–2016	Lilies of the Valley by Jun Miyake	Interview with the Vampire by Elliot Goldenthal
2014–2015	The Artist by Ludovic Bource	Interview with the Vampire by Elliot Goldenthal
2013–2014	The Artist by Ludovic Bource	Dark Eyes; Moldova performed by Sergei Trofanov
2012–2013		Dark Eyes; Moldova performed by Sergei Trofanov
2011–2012		Korobushka by Bond
2010–2011	Fuego by Bond	Korobushka by Bond
2009–2010	Fuego by Bond	Burgmuller: La Péri / Act 1 - Overture performed by London Symphony Orchestra
2008–2009	Malagueña by Bond	Kiki's Delivery Service by Joe Hisaishi

== Competitive highlights ==
CS: Challenger Series; JGP: Junior Grand Prix

=== Pairs with Kam ===
International
Event	2015–16	2016–17	2017–18
Olympics			22nd
World Champ.			26th
Four Continents		15th	WD
CS Autumn Classic		5th	5th
Asian Games		5th	
Cup of Nice			3rd
International: Junior
Bavarian Open	5th J		
Sarajevo Open	1st J		
National
South Korean Champ.		3rd	1st
Team events
Olympics			9th T 10th P
J = Junior level; TBD = Assigned

=== Ladies' singles ===
International
Event	12–13	13–14	14–15	15–16
CS Denkova-Staviski				9th
CS Ice Challenge			7th	
Lombardia Trophy				7th
International: Junior
JGP Estonia		9th		
JGP Germany			15th	
Asian Trophy	4th		4th	
National
South Korean Champ.	8th	5th	11th	
Levels: N = Novice; J = Junior

== Detailed results ==
=== Pairs with Kang-chan Kam ===
2017–2018 season
Date	Event	SP	FS	Total
October 11–15, 2017	2017 International Cup of Nice	4; 53.43	3; 102.83	3; 156.26
September 20–23, 2017	2017 CS Autumn Classic	6; **55.02**	5; **94.70**	5; **149.72**
August 10–13, 2017	Championnats québécois d'été 2017	7; 50.66	6; 91.76	6; 142.42
2016–2017 season
Date	Event	SP	FS	Total
February 19–26, 2017	2017 Asian Winter Games	6; 46.61	5; 95.24	5; 141.88
February 15–19, 2017	2017 Four Continents Championships	15; 41.06	15; 77.85	15; 118.91
January 6–8, 2017	2017 South Korean Championships	1; 49.30	3; 78.27	3; 127.57
September 28–October 1, 2016	2016 CS Autumn Classic	5; 43.88	5; 79.36	5; 123.24

2015–2016 season
Date	Event	Level	SP	FS	Total
February 17–21, 2016	Bavarian Open	Junior	4; 41.06	6; 61.92	5; 102.98
February 4–7, 2016	Sarajevo Open	Junior	1; 39.26	1; 80.76	1; 120.02

=== Single skating ===
2015–16 season
Date	Event	Level	SP	FS	Total
October 20–25, 2015	2015 ISU CS Denkova-Staviski Cup	Senior	7; **48.67**	9; 82.18	9; 130.85
September 17–20, 2015	2015 Lombardia Trophy	Senior	9; 43.86	7; 77.56	7; 121.42
2014–15 season
Date	Event	Level	SP	FS	Total
January 7–9, 2015	2015 South Korean Championships	Senior	5; 52.60	11; 87.72	10; 140.32
November 14–16, 2014	2014 Ice Challenge	Senior	8; 43.21	7; 84.63	7; 127.84
October 1–October 4, 2014	2014 ISU Junior Grand Prix, Germany	Junior	11; 41.39	17; 65.33	15; 106.72
August 7–10, 2014	2014 Asian Open Figure Skating Trophy	Senior	3; 55.23	4; 85.41	4; 140.64
2013–14 season
Date	Event	Level	SP	FS	Total
January 3–5, 2014	2014 South Korean Championships	Senior	3; 54.15	7; 98.22	5; 152.37
October 9–October 12, 2014	2012 ISU Junior Grand Prix, Estonia	Junior	11; 43.88	9; **88.57**	9; **132.45**
2012–13 season
Date	Event	Level	SP	FS	Total
January 2–6, 2013	2013 South Korean Championships	Senior	9; 46.01	9; 84.82	8; 130.83
August 7–12, 2012	2012 Asian Figure Skating Trophy	Junior	4; 41.27	5; 78.93	4; 120.20

- Personal best highlighted in **bold**.
