= 2017 CS Autumn Classic International =

- Type: ISU Challenger Series
- Date: September 20–23, 2017
- Season: 2017–2018
- Location: Montreal, Quebec, Canada
- Host: Skate Canada
- Venue: Sportsplexe Pierrefonds

Champions
- Men's singles: (Spain) Javier Fernández
- Ladies' singles: (Canada) Kaetlyn Osmond
- Pairs: (France) Vanessa James / Morgan Cipres
- Ice dance: (Canada) Tessa Virtue / Scott Moir
- Previous: 2016 CS Autumn Classic International
- Next: 2018 CS Autumn Classic International
- Previous Grand Prix: 2017 CS Lombardia Trophy
- Next Grand Prix: 2017 CS Ondrej Nepela Trophy

The 2017 CS Autumn Classic International was held in September 2017 at the Sportsplexe Pierrefonds in Montreal, Quebec, Canada. It was part of the 2017–18 ISU Challenger Series. Medals were awarded in men's singles, ladies' singles, pair skating, and ice dance.

== Entries ==
The International Skating Union published the preliminary list of entries on August 29, 2017.

Country	Men	Ladies	Pairs	Ice dance
Australia	Andrew Dodds	Brooklee Han	Paris Stephens / Matthew Dodds	—
Australia	Jordan Dodds	—		—
Bulgaria	—	—		Teodora Markova / Simon Daze
Canada	Elladj Baldé	Alaine Chartrand	Meagan Duhamel / Eric Radford	Piper Gilles / Paul Poirier
Canada	Keegan Messing	Kaetlyn Osmond	Julianne Séguin / Charlie Bilodeau	Tessa Virtue / Scott Moir
Canada	Nam Nguyen	Sarah Tamura	—	Kaitlyn Weaver / Andrew Poje
Chinese Taipei	Meng Ju Lee	—	—	—
Czech Republic	—	—	—	Nicole Kuzmichová / Alexandr Sinicyn
Denmark	—	—	—	Laurence Fournier Beaudry / Nikolaj Sørensen
France	Kevin Aymoz	Maé-Bérénice Méité	Vanessa James / Morgan Cipres	Kate Louise Bagnall / Benjamin Allain
France	—	—		Marie-Jade Lauriault / Romain Le Gac
Germany	Peter Liebers	—		—
Great Britain	Harry Mattick	—		—
Israel	Oleksii Bychenko	Michelle Lifshits	Paige Conners / Evgeni Krasnopolski	Adel Tankova / Ronald Zilberberg
Israel	—	Netta Schreiber	—	—
Japan	Yuzuru Hanyu	Mai Mihara	—	—
Japan	Daisuke Murakami	Rin Nitaya	—	—
Kazakhstan	—	Anastassiya Khvan	—	—
Kazakhstan	—	Elizabet Tursynbayeva	—	—
Romania	—	Amanda Stan	—	—
Singapore	—	Chloe Ing	—	—
South Korea	—	—	Kyueun Kim / Alex Kang-chan Kam	—
Spain	Javier Fernández	—	—	Celia Robledo / Luis Fenero
Spain	Javier Raya	—	—	Olivia Smart / Adria Diaz
Switzerland	Tim Huber	—	—	—
Thailand	—	Natalie Sangkagalo	—	—
Ukraine	—	Anastasia Kononenko	—	—
United States	Ross Miner	Courtney Hicks	Jessica Calalang / Zack Sidhu	Lorraine McNamara / Quinn Carpenter
United States	—	Olivia Shilling	Marissa Castelli / Mervin Tran	—
United States	—	Megan Wessenberg	—	—
Uzbekistan	Misha Ge	—	—	—

== Results ==
=== Men's singles ===
Rank	Name	Nation	Total	SP		FS	
1	Javier Fernández	Spain	279.07	2	101.20	1	177.87
2	Yuzuru Hanyu	Japan	268.24	1	112.72	5	155.52
3	Keegan Messing	Canada	248.30	4	86.33	3	161.97
4	Misha Ge	Uzbekistan	246.19	5	83.64	2	162.55
5	Nam Nguyen	Canada	245.21	3	88.40	4	156.81
6	Ross Miner	United States	219.96	8	69.84	6	150.12
7	Peter Liebers	Germany	207.89	6	73.34	7	134.55
8	Daisuke Murakami	Japan	200.59	7	70.09	8	130.50
9	Mark Gorodnitsky	Israel	186.02	10	60.52	9	125.50
10	Andrew Dodds	Australia	164.07	9	62.69	10	101.38
11	Jordan Dodds	Australia	149.95	11	50.48	11	99.47
12	Harry Mattick	Great Britain	145.80	12	50.25	12	95.55
13	Meng Ju Lee	Chinese Taipei	140.32	13	46.34	14	93.98
14	Tim Huber	Switzerland	131.56	14	37.27	13	94.29

=== Ladies' singles ===
Rank	Name	Nation	Total	SP		FS	
1	Kaetlyn Osmond	Canada	217.55	1	75.21	1	142.34
2	Mai Mihara	Japan	199.02	2	66.18	2	132.84
3	Elizabet Tursynbaeva	Kazakhstan	181.00	5	56.62	3	124.38
4	Courtney Hicks	United States	174.16	3	59.77	4	114.39
5	Alaine Chartrand	Canada	162.42	6	55.21	6	107.21
6	Rin Nitaya	Japan	161.20	9	46.83	5	114.37
7	Brooklee Han	Australia	158.81	4	57.65	7	101.16
8	Maé-Bérénice Méité	France	141.41	8	49.65	8	91.76
9	Olivia Shilling	United States	134.78	7	53.00	10	81.78
10	Chloe Ing	Singapore	130.55	10	44.87	9	72.72
11	Sarah Tamura	Canada	110.93	12	39.49	11	71.44
12	Jang Hyun-su	South Korea	100.51	11	40.02	13	60.49
13	Anastasia Kononenko	Ukraine	96.24	13	35.82	14	60.42
14	Natalie Sangkagalo	Thailand	91.61	16	30.02	12	61.59
15	Michelle Lifshits	Israel	88.24	15	31.65	15	56.59
16	Yun Sung-hyun	South Korea	74.77	17	27.42	16	47.35
17	Amanda Stan	Romania	withdrew	14	32.03	withdrew from competition	

=== Pairs ===
Rank	Name	Nation	Total	SP		FS	
1	Vanessa James / Morgan Ciprès	France	210.48	2	73.48	1	137.00
2	Meagan Duhamel / Eric Radford	Canada	202.98	1	77.14	3	125.84
3	Julianne Séguin / Charlie Bilodeau	Canada	189.64	3	61.72	2	127.92
4	Marissa Castelli / Mervin Tran	United States	176.38	4	58.64	4	117.74
5	Kim Kyu-eun / Alex Kam	South Korea	149.72	6	55.02	5	94.70
6	Jessica Calalang / Zack Sidhu	United States	146.86	5	56.22	6	90.64
7	Paris Stephens / Matthew Dodds	Australia	85.32	7	28.96	7	56.36

=== Ice dance ===
Rank	Name	Nation	Total	SP		FS	
1	Tessa Virtue / Scott Moir	Canada	195.76	1	79.96	1	115.80
2	Kaitlyn Weaver / Andrew Poje	Canada	173.56	2	69.32	2	104.24
3	Piper Gilles / Paul Poirier	Canada	172.26	3	68.80	3	103.46
4	Olivia Smart / Adrià Díaz	Spain	155.56	5	61.68	4	93.88
5	Lorraine McNamara / Quinn Carpenter	United States	154.50	4	62.00	6	92.50
6	Marie-Jade Lauriault / Romain Le Gac	France	149.34	6	58.80	7	90.54
7	Laurence Fournier Beaudry / Nikolaj Sørensen	Denmark	147.56	7	54.90	5	92.66
8	Celia Robledo / Luis Fenero	Spain	129.44	8	51.82	8	77.62
9	Nicole Kuzmichová / Alexandr Sinicyn	Czech Republic	121.68	9	49.08	9	72.60
