= 2016 CS Autumn Classic International =

- Type: ISU Challenger Series
- Date: September 28 – October 1
- Season: 2016–17
- Location: Montreal, Quebec, Canada
- Host: Skate Canada
- Venue: Sportsplexe Pierrefonds

Champions
- Men's singles: (Japan) Yuzuru Hanyu
- Ladies' singles: (United States) Mirai Nagasu
- Pairs: (Canada) Julianne Séguin / Charlie Bilodeau
- Ice dance: (Canada) Tessa Virtue / Scott Moir
- Previous: 2015 Autumn Classic International
- Next: 2017 CS Autumn Classic International
- Previous Grand Prix: 2016 CS Nebelhorn Trophy
- Next Grand Prix: 2016 CS Ondrej Nepela Memorial

The 2016 CS Autumn Classic International was held from September 28 – October 1, 2016 at the Sportsplexe Pierrefonds in Montreal, Quebec, Canada. It was part of the 2016–17 ISU Challenger Series. Medals were awarded in men's singles, ladies' singles, pair skating, and ice dance.

== Entries ==
Country	Men	Ladies	Pairs	Ice dance
Armenia	—	Anastasia Galustyan	—	—
Australia	Andrew Dodds	—	Paris Stephens / Matthew Dodds	—
Australia	Jordan Dodds	—	—	—
Australia	Mark Webster	—	—	—
Canada	Keegan Messing	Larkyn Austman	Camille Ruest / Andrew Wolfe	Haley Sales / Nikolas Wamsteeker
Canada	Bennet Toman	Alaine Chartrand	Julianne Séguin / Charlie Bilodeau	Carolane Soucisse / Shane Firus
Canada	—	Michelle Long	—	Tessa Virtue / Scott Moir
Croatia	Nicholas Vrdoljak	—	—	—
Denmark	—	—	—	Laurence Fournier Beaudry / Nikolaj Sørensen
France	—	—	Vanessa James / Morgan Cipres	Marie-Jade Lauriault / Romain Le Gac
Great Britain	Harry Mattick	—	—	—
Great Britain	Jamie Wright	—	—	—
Hong Kong	Leslie Man Cheuk Ip	Maisy Hiu Ching Ma	—	—
Israel	Daniel Samohin	—	—	Isabella Tobias / Ilia Tkachenko
Japan	Yuzuru Hanyu	Rika Hongo	—	—
Japan	—	Mariko Kihara	—	—
Kazakhstan	—	Elizabet Tursynbayeva	—	—
Mexico	Diego Saldana		—	—
Poland	—	Colette Coco Kaminski	—	—
Romania	—	Amanda Stan	—	—
Singapore	—	Chloe Ing	—	—
South Africa	—	Michaela du Toit	—	—
South Korea	—	Kim Na-hyun	Kim Kyu-eun / Alex Kang-chan Kam	Lee Ho-jung / Richard Kang-in Kam
South Korea	—	Son Suh-hyun	—	—
Spain	Javier Raya	—	—	Celia Robledo / Luis Fenero
Spain	—	—	—	Olivia Smart / Adrián Díaz
Sweden	—	Joshi Helgesson	—	—
United States	Max Aaron	Franchesca Chiera	Marissa Castelli / Mervin Tran	Kaitlin Hawayek / Jean-Luc Baker
United States	—	Mirai Nagasu	—	
Uzbekistan	Misha Ge	—	—	

== Results ==
=== Men's singles ===
Rank	Name	Nation	Total	SP		FS	
1	Yuzuru Hanyu	Japan	260.57	1	88.30	1	172.27
2	Misha Ge	Uzbekistan	230.55	2	79.52	3	151.03
3	Max Aaron	United States	226.13	5	70.74	2	155.39
4	Keegan Messing	Canada	215.10	3	75.41	4	139.69
5	Bennet Toman	Canada	206.41	4	70.78	5	135.63
6	Daniel Samohin	Israel	189.90	7	60.81	7	129.09
7	Javier Raya	Spain	188.04	9	57.72	6	130.32
8	Nicholas Vrdoljak	Croatia	187.28	6	61.71	8	125.57
9	Harry Mattick	Great Britain	169.33	11	56.37	10	112.96
10	Jamie Wright	Great Britain	163.65	10	57.45	11	106.20
11	Leslie Man Cheuk Ip	Hong Kong	161.18	13	46.56	9	114.62
12	Jordan Dodds	Australia	154.90	12	53.21	12	101.69
13	Andrew Dodds	Australia	154.59	8	58.28	13	96.31
14	Mark Webster	Australia	129.85	14	44.60	14	85.25
15	Diego Saldana	Mexico	102.76	15	39.53	15	63.23

=== Ladies' singles ===
Rank	Name	Nation	Total	SP		FS	
1	Mirai Nagasu	United States	189.11	1	73.40	2	115.71
2	Alaine Chartrand	Canada	186.11	6	56.61	1	129.50
3	Elizabet Tursynbayeva	Kazakhstan	172.46	2	61.48	3	110.98
4	Rika Hongo	Japan	170.34	4	60.33	4	110.01
5	Mariko Kihara	Japan	161.21	5	59.09	5	102.12
6	Kim Na-hyun	South Korea	160.91	3	60.38	6	100.53
7	Joshi Helgesson	Sweden	153.80	8	53.55	7	100.25
8	Franchesca Chiera	United States	137.21	7	56.09	11	81.12
9	Anastasia Galustyan	Armenia	136.65	9	50.79	10	85.86
10	Chloe Ing	Singapore	132.22	12	42.74	8	89.48
11	Michelle Long	Canada	131.42	10	44.13	9	87.29
12	Larkyn Austman	Canada	121.46	13	42.23	13	79.23
13	Colette Coco Kaminski	Poland	119.56	16	38.77	12	80.79
14	Maisy Hiu Ching Ma	Hong Kong	112.24	11	43.87	14	68.37
15	Michaela du Toit	South Africa	109.92	14	41.93	15	67.99
16	Amanda Stan	Romania	107.50	15	41.66	17	65.84
17	Son Suh-hyun	South Korea	97.85	17	31.91	16	65.94

=== Pairs ===
Rank	Name	Nation	Total	SP		FS	
1	Julianne Séguin / Charlie Bilodeau	Canada	208.30	1	71.40	1	136.90
2	Vanessa James / Morgan Ciprès	France	198.90	3	65.58	2	133.32
3	Marissa Castelli / Mervin Tran	United States	173.62	2	67.50	3	106.12
4	Camille Ruest / Andrew Wolfe	Canada	159.28	4	64.40	4	94.88
5	Kim Kyu-eun / Alex Kang-chan Kam	South Korea	123.24	5	43.88	5	79.36
6	Paris Stephens / Matthew Dodds	Australia	96.84	6	33.00	6	63.84

=== Ice dance ===
Rank	Name	Nation	Total	SD		FD	
1	Tessa Virtue / Scott Moir	Canada	189.20	1	77.72	1	111.48
2	Kaitlin Hawayek / Jean-Luc Baker	United States	160.50	3	62.70	2	97.80
3	Laurence Fournier Beaudry / Nikolaj Sørensen	Denmark	152.00	2	63.26	4	88.74
4	Isabella Tobias / Ilia Tkachenko	Israel	150.32	4	59.36	3	90.96
5	Marie-Jade Lauriault / Romain Le Gac	France	143.60	6	55.46	5	88.14
6	Olivia Smart / Adrià Díaz	Spain	141.50	5	56.10	6	85.40
7	Carolane Soucisse / Shane Firus	Canada	128.78	7	48.78	7	80.00
8	Celia Robledo / Luis Fenero	Spain	122.88	8	47.30	8	75.58
9	Haley Sales / Nikolas Wamsteeker	Canada	112.52	9	46.76	9	65.76
