= Morgan Ciprès =

French Olympic figure skater

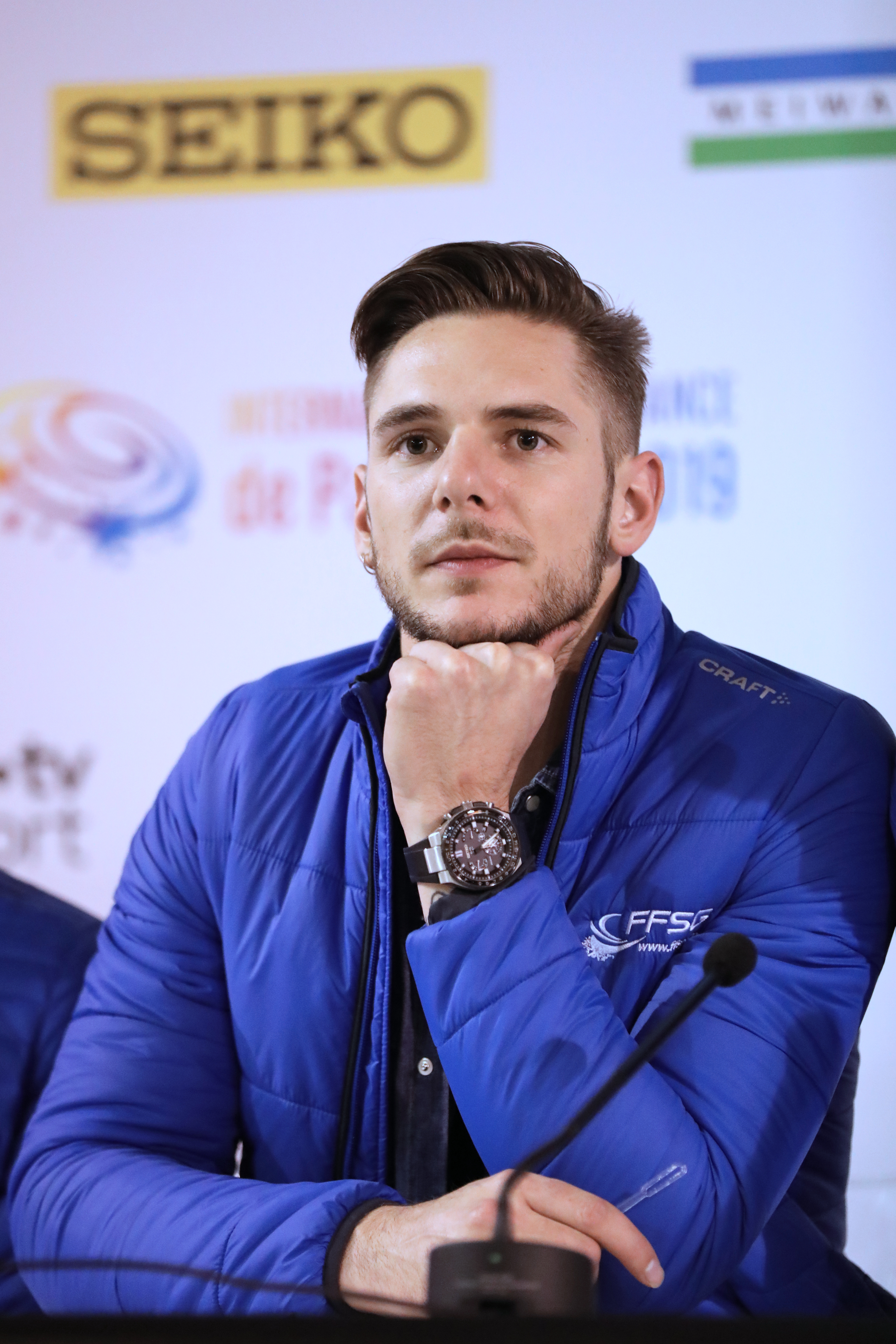
- Morgan Ciprès at the 2019 Internationaux de France

Personal information
- Born: 24 April 1991 (age 35) Melun, France
- Height: 1.81 m (5 ft 11 in)

Figure skating career
- Country: France
- Discipline: Pair skating
- Partner: Vanessa James
- Began skating: 1995
- Retired: September 29, 2020
- Highest WS: 6th (2017–18 & 2016–17)

Medal record
Event	Gold medal – first place	Silver medal – second place	Bronze medal – third place
World Championships	0	0	1
European Championships	1	0	1
Grand Prix Final	1	0	0
French Championships	6	1	0
Medal list
World Championships
Bronze medal – third place	2018 Montpellier	Pairs
European Championships
Gold medal – first place	2019 Minsk	Pairs
Bronze medal – third place	2017 Ostrava	Pairs
Grand Prix Final
Gold medal – first place	2018–19 Vancouver	Pairs
French Championships
Gold medal – first place	2013 Strasbourg	Pairs
Gold medal – first place	2014 Vaujany	Pairs
Gold medal – first place	2015 Megève	Pairs
Gold medal – first place	2016 Épinal	Pairs
Gold medal – first place	2017 Caen	Pairs
Gold medal – first place	2019 Vaujany	Pairs
Silver medal – second place	2012 Dammarie-les-Lys	Pairs

Morgan Ciprès (born 24 April 1991) is a French former competitive pair skater. With partner Vanessa James, born in Scarborough, Ontario, Canada, he is the 2019 European Champion, the 2018 World bronze medalist, the 2017 European bronze medalist, the 2018 Grand Prix Final champion and a six-time French national champion. They have also won medals in Grand Prix and Challenger Series competitions. James and Ciprès represented France at the 2014 and 2018 Winter Olympics.

== Early career ==
Born in Melun, France in 1991, Ciprès began learning to skate in 1995. He initially competed in single skating, debuting on the ISU Junior Grand Prix in 2004. An adductor muscle injury caused him to miss the 2007–08 season. He placed 13th at the 2010 World Junior Championships.

== Pair skating career ==
In September 2010, Ciprès teamed up with Canadian/American Vanessa James to compete in pair skating for France. They made no competitive appearances in their first season as Ciprès learned pairs elements. Eight years later, James recalled the beginning of her partnership: "I remember our 3-day-trial and it was so fun. He was so funny, because he had never done pairs before, so he was really nervous and saying 'oh my gosh, oh my gosh' every time he threw me. I knew that we were going to be good friends."

=== 2011–2012 season ===
James/Ciprès made their competitive debut in late September 2011, finishing fifth at the 2011 Ondrej Nepela Memorial. After placing fifth at the 2011 Coupe de Nice, the pair finished eighth at their first Grand Prix together, the 2011 Trophee Eric Bompard. At the 2012 French Championships, they ranked first in the short program and second in the free skate. With a total score 8.92 points lower than Daria Popova / Bruno Massot, James/Ciprès received the silver medal.

Finishing sixth overall, James/Ciprès were the best French pair (outscoring Popova/Massot by almost 12 points) at the 2012 European Championships in Sheffield, England. They were granted France's lone spot in pairs at the 2012 World Championships in Nice, France. In Nice, the two qualified to the final segment and finished sixteenth overall.

=== 2012–2013 season ===
James/Ciprès won the bronze medal at the 2012 Nebelhorn Trophy — it was their first international medal as a pair. Their 2012 Grand Prix assignments were Skate America, where they placed fourth, and the Trophee Eric Bompard, where they came in sixth. James/Ciprès won another international medal at the 2012 NRW Trophy and followed that in December with their first French national title.

In January, James/Ciprès came in fourth at the 2013 European Championships in Zagreb, Croatia. After taking gold at the 2013 International Challenge Cup, they placed eighth at the 2013 World Championships in London, Ontario. Due to their result in Canada, they qualified a spot for France in the pairs' event at the 2014 Winter Olympics in Sochi, Russia.

=== 2013–2014 season: Sochi Olympics ===
James/Ciprès were again assigned to Skate America and the Trophee Eric Bompard. After Ciprès underwent surgery to correct a wrist injury, he had to avoid lifts for a period, causing the pair to withdraw from Skate America. They were able to compete at the Trophee Eric Bompard and placed fifth. The pair successfully defended their national title, winning in 2013.

At the 2014 Europeans, James/Ciprès set personal best scores in both segments of the competition and came in fifth. They were named to the French team to the 2014 Winter Olympics in Sochi. There they placed tenth in the pairs event and sixth in the team event.

=== 2014–2015 season ===
James/Ciprès finished fourth at the 2014 CS Nebelhorn Trophy and fifth at both of their Grand Prix assignments, the 2014 Skate Canada International and 2014 Trophée Éric Bompard. They placed fifth at the 2015 European Championships in Stockholm and ninth at the 2015 World Championships in Shanghai.

=== 2015–2016 season: First Grand Prix medal ===
James/Ciprès began their season with a bronze medal at the 2015 CS Nebelhorn Trophy. They placed second in the short program at the 2015 Trophée Éric Bompard. The remainder of the event was cancelled following the November 2015 Paris attacks by terrorists. The ISU deemed those placements to be the final results, and awarded James/Ciprès silver as their first Grand Prix medal. The pair finished fourth at the 2016 European Championships in Bratislava and tenth at the 2016 World Championships in Boston. At the end of the season, they concluded that they needed a major change if they were to continue competing. James said "either we improve, or we stop. There was no point in anything else."

=== 2016–2017 season: European bronze medal ===
In June 2016, James/Ciprès relocated to Coral Springs, Florida, to be coached by John Zimmerman and Jeremy Barrett, both former competitive skaters. After taking silver at the 2016 CS Autumn Classic International, the pair competed at two Grand Prix events; they finished fourth at the 2016 Skate America and won the bronze medal at the 2016 Trophée de France.

In January 2017, James/Ciprès won the bronze medal at the European Championships in Ostrava, Czech Republic. They were the first French pair in fourteen years to medal at the event. (In 2003, Sarah Abitbol / Stéphane Bernadis took silver).

In March, James/Ciprès placed tenth in the short program, sixth in the free skate, and eighth overall at the 2017 World Championships in Helsinki, Finland. The following month, they competed as part of Team France at the 2017 World Team Trophy in Tokyo, Japan. While the French team finished sixth overall, the pair scored personal bests and placed first in both segments of the pairs' event, ahead of Russia's Evgenia Tarasova / Vladimir Morozov.

Reflecting on their progress as a team, James said, "Our main problem [before] was that we were two different people on the ice. We needed to change that and to increase the connection between the two of us."

=== 2017–2018 season: PyeongChang Olympics and World bronze medal ===
James/Ciprès began their season with gold at the 2017 CS Autumn Classic International. They won medals at both of their Grand Prix assignments, taking bronze at the 2017 Skate Canada International and silver at the 2017 Internationaux de France. They finished as the first alternates for the Grand Prix Final. At the 2018 European Championships in Moscow, the pair placed first in the short program, fourth in the free skate, and fourth overall — 0.01 shy of the podium. They received a small gold medal for their short program.

James/Ciprès were named to France's delegation to the 2018 Winter Olympics, which took place in February in Pyeongchang, South Korea. During the team event, they placed sixth in their segment and Team France finished tenth. In the regular pairs event, they placed sixth in the short, fifth in the free, and fifth overall. In March, they became the first French pair since 2000 to stand on the World podium, winning the bronze medal at the 2018 World Championships in Milan, Italy. James, reflecting on the start of her partnership, remarked "I'm so glad I made that choice because we're a really good team today. It's been bumpy, but amazing with Morgan."

=== 2018–2019 season ===
The duo's programs were both choreographed by ice dancers. Charlie White, a retired Olympic gold medalist, worked on the free skate, and fellow French Olympian Guillaume Cizeron developed the short programme.

James/Ciprès won gold at their first event of the season, the 2018 CS Autumn Classic International and obtained their first victory at a Grand Prix event, at 2018 Skate Canada International, setting a new world record in the free skate. James said that they "gave so much emotion, and at the end, it was just magic for us." In mid-November they competed at the 2018 Internationaux de France, where they won their second Grand Prix gold medal of the season, albeit with a somewhat rockier performance in the short program. They ranked third before winning the free skate. These results qualified them for their first Grand Prix Final, for 2018–19.

Ciprès said "it's the first time for us to win two Grand Prix in the season and to go to the Grand Prix Final. We have a lot of work to do for these next two weeks." In fourth after the short program in the Final, they again set a world record to win the free skate and the gold medal. James expressed the hope that "having this long program so solid and strong will just help when we have a good short program. I know we have to fight every time after our short program to make up the points, but feeling more free and not having to try and try to make a comeback, I think will just liberate us a little bit more, I am hoping."

After winning another national title, their sixth, James/Ciprès competed at the 2019 European Championships in Minsk. After a first-place finish in the short program, they were ahead of Tarasova/Morozov. They won the free skate as well, taking the European pairs title. They were only the second French team to do so, and the first since 1932, when Andrée Joly and Pierre Brunet won it. James called the result "a dream come true", saying that it was "a dream when we were children to be here one day."

In March at the 2019 World Championships in Saitama, during the short program warm-up, James had a collision with Italy's Matteo Guarise, in which both skaters fell onto the ice. James/Ciprès placed a very unexpected seventh in the short program after additional mishaps. James fell on her throw triple flip, and Ciprès doubled his planned triple toe loop. In the free program they placed third, and fifth overall. They did not make the 'top of podium' for the first time that season, but took a small bronze medal for the free program. At the end of their free program, James/Ciprès announced that they would continue to keep skating until they won the World title. To finish the season, they competed at the 2019 World Team Trophy in Fukuoka, Japan. They earned a new personal best in the free skate to earn first in the pairs event and fourth overall with the French team.

Following the 2018–19 season, James/Ciprès were initially given two assignments on the 2019–20 Grand Prix circuit, the 2019 NHK Trophy and 2019 Internationaux de France. At the same time, it was announced that James would be appearing on the revival of the Canadian CBC skating competition program Battle of the Blades in the fall of 2019, partnered with retired NHL player Brian McGrattan. James/Ciprès subsequently withdrew from their Grand Prix assignments, concluding they could not practically do both.

== Sexual abuse allegations and retirement ==
On 10 December 2019, USA Today journalist Christine Brennan reported that Ciprès was under investigation by the United States Center for SafeSport, which investigates sexual abuse in Olympic sports, for having sent a picture of his penis to a 13-year-old girl who was a student at their training center. She reported that coaches Zimmerman and Silvia Fontana were accused of having known about this and attempted to cover it up in the runup to the 2018 Olympics. Zimmerman — who coached the 13-year-old as well as Cipres — was suspended by SafeSport in March 2021 for covering up the 2017 abuse, and for shaming and threatening the girl after he found out about the incident.

James/Ciprès did not compete again during the remainder of the season. The allegations against Ciprès subsequently factored into the scandals that forced the resignation of controversial FFSG chief Didier Gailhaguet in the spring of 2020. In July 2020, the FFSG's disciplinary committee declined to take action against Ciprès, claiming that it was not aware of the alleged victim's complaint, and that there was a lack of "objective [elements] (photographs, messages, letters) that could establish proof of any offense."

On 25 September 2020, it was announced that James would return to Battle of the Blades for its sixth season, this time partnered with Akim Aliu. Four days later, the FFSG announced that James and Ciprès would both be retiring from competition.

On 8 December 2020, the Florida state attorney's office filed a third-degree felony charge against Ciprès for the transmission of material harmful to a minor by electronic device, which carries up to a five-year prison sentence, and issued a warrant for his arrest. The investigation had been reopened in June; the U.S. SafeSport investigation remains ongoing.

James announced in April 2021 that she was coming out of retirement. She has partnered with Canadian pairs skater Eric Radford.

== Programs ==
=== With James ===
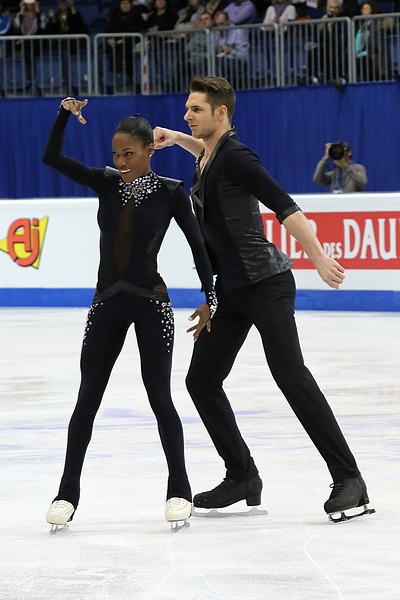
James and Ciprès at the 2016 European Championships

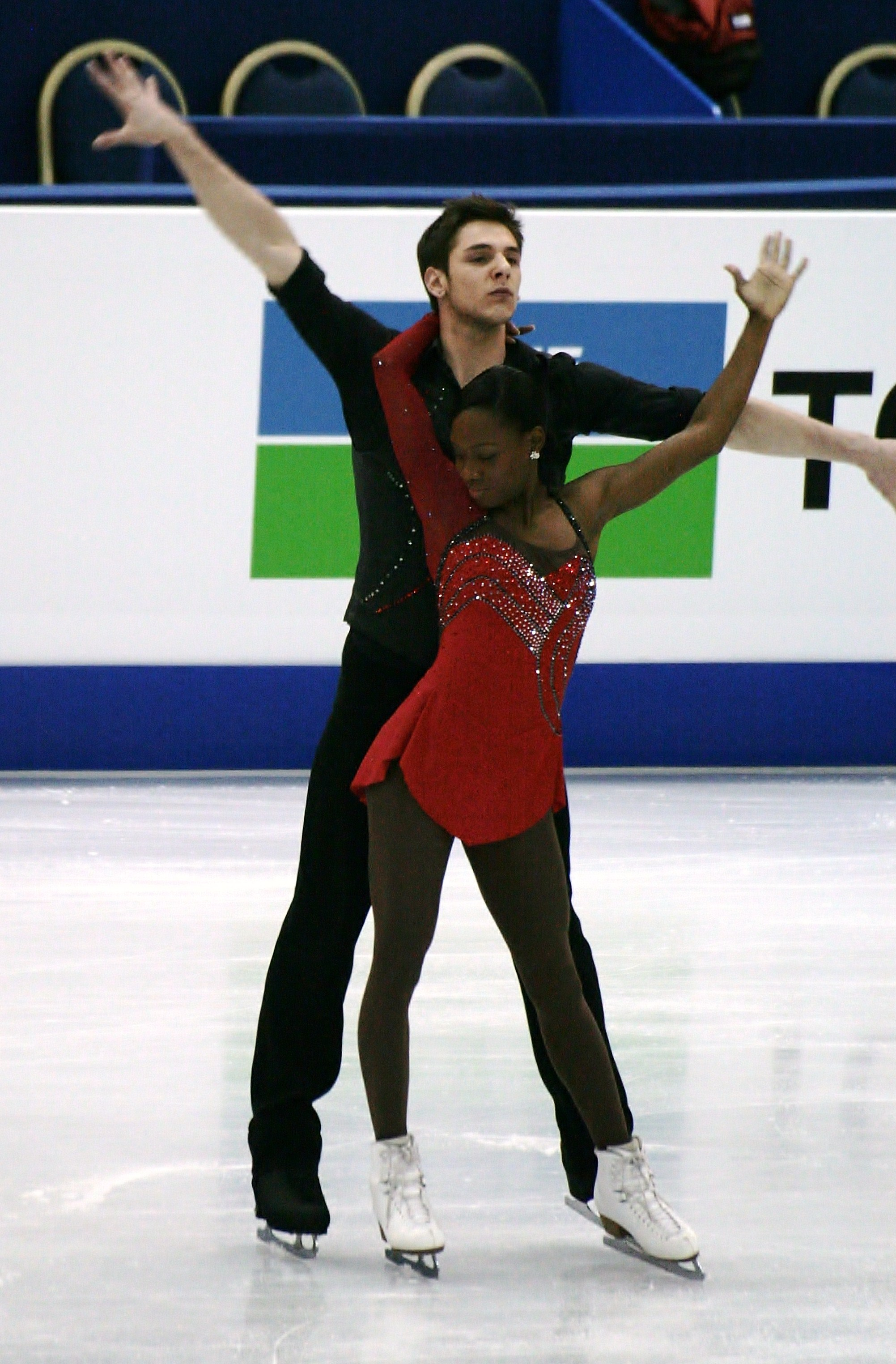
James and Ciprès compete in 2012.

Season	Short program	Free skating	Exhibition
2018–2019	Uninvited by Alanis Morissette choreo. by Guillaume Cizeron	Wicked Game choreo. by Charlie White	The Way You Make Me Feel; Black or White by Michael Jackson
2017–2018	Make It Rain by Ed Sheeran arranged by Maxime Rodriguez	Say Something by A Great Big World and Christina Aguilera; Sense of Freedom by Maxime Rodriguez; The Sound of Silence by Disturbed, Maxime Rodriguez	The Way You Make Me Feel; Black or White by Michael Jackson; Angel (piano mix) by The Weeknd, The Theorist
2016–2017	Earned It (from Fifty Shades of Grey) by The Weeknd, Maxime Rodriguez	The Sound of Silence by Disturbed, Maxime Rodriguez	Scared of Lonely by Beyoncé; Unsteady by X Ambassadors; Belle (from Notre-Dame de Paris) by Riccardo Cocciante
2015–2016	I Put a Spell on You performed by Joss Stone	Romeo + Juliet by Craig Armstrong; Romeo & Juliet by Abel Korzeniowski; Romeo + Juliet by Craig Armstrong	Scared of Lonely by Beyoncé
2014–2015	El Tango de Roxanne (from Moulin Rouge!) performed by Ewan McGregor, José Feliciano, Jacek Koman; La cumparsita by Gerardo Matos Rodríguez	Angels & Demons by Hans Zimmer; Heaven and Hell by Vangelis; Requiem for a Dream by Clint Mansell	Scared of Lonely by Beyoncé
2013–2014	Minnie the Moocher by Cab Calloway; Jumpin' Jack by Big Bad Voodoo Daddy	Angels & Demons by Hans Zimmer; Heaven and Hell by Vangelis; Requiem for a Dream by Clint Mansell	
2012–2013	Rhumba d'Amour; Safri Duo	Pearl Harbor by Hans Zimmer	There You'll Be (from Pearl Harbor) by Faith Hill
2011–2012	Tango de Roxanne (from Moulin Rouge!)	Nostalgia by Yanni	

=== Singles career ===
Season	Short program	Free skating
2009–2010	Hana's Eyes by Maksim Mrvica	Alexander by Vangelis
2005–2006	The Last Temptation of Christ by Peter Gabriel	Pearl Harbor by Hans Zimmer

== Competitive highlights ==
GP: Grand Prix; CS: Challenger Series; JGP: Junior Grand Prix

=== Pairs with Vanessa James ===
International
Event	11–12	12–13	13–14	14–15	15–16	16–17	17–18	18–19
Olympics			10th				5th	
Worlds	16th	8th	10th	9th	10th	8th	3rd	5th
Europeans	6th	4th	5th	5th	4th	3rd	4th	1st
GP Final								1st
GP France	8th	6th	5th	5th	2nd	3rd	2nd	1st
GP NHK Trophy					6th			
GP Skate Canada				5th			3rd	1st
GP Skate America		4th	WD			4th		
CS Autumn Classic						2nd	1st	1st
CS Nebelhorn				4th	3rd			
Challenge Cup		1st						
Cup of Nice	5th							
Cup of Tyrol					2nd			
Denkova-Staviski			1st					
Nebelhorn Trophy		3rd						
Nepela Memorial	5th							
NRW Trophy		3rd						
Universiade				3rd				
National
French Champ.	2nd	1st	1st	1st	1st	1st	WD	1st
Masters	1st	1st	2nd	1st	1st		1st	1st
Team events
Olympics			6th T				10th T	
World Team; Trophy		6th T 4th P		6th T 5th P		6th T 1st P		4th T 1st P

=== Single skating ===
International
Event	04–05	05–06	06–07	07–08	08–09	09–10
Junior Worlds						13th
JGP Czech Republic			17th		11th	
JGP Estonia		13th				
JGP Germany						11th
JGP Hungary						9th
JGP Netherlands			18th			
JGP Ukraine	20th					
JGP U.K.					9th	
National
French Champ.			11th		7th	4th
Master's de Patinage					2nd J	2nd J

== Detailed results ==
Small medals for short and free programs awarded only at ISU Championships. At team events, medals awarded for team results only.

=== With James ===
2018–19 season
Date	Event	SP	FS	Total
11–14 April 2019	2019 World Team Trophy	2; 73.48	1; 152.52	4T/1P; 226.00
18–24 March 2019	2019 World Championships	7; 68.67	3; 146.52	5; 215.19
21–27 January 2019	2019 European Championships	1; 76.55	1; 149.11	1; 225.66
13–15 December 2018	2018 French Championships	1; 82.70	1; 158.27	1; 240.97
7–9 December 2018	2018 Grand Prix Final	4; 71.51	1; 148.37	1; 219.88
23–25 November 2018	2018 Internationaux de France	3; 65.24	1; 140.53	1; 205.77
26–28 October 2018	2018 Skate Canada International	1; 74.51	1; 147.30	1; 221.81
20–22 September 2018	2018 CS Autumn Classic International	1; 73.81	1; 136.40	1; 210.21
2017–18 season
Date	Event	SP	FS	Total
21–24 March 2018	2018 World Championships	3; 75.32	3; 143.04	3; 218.36
14–25 February 2018	2018 Winter Olympics	6; 75.34	5; 143.19	5; 218.53
9–12 February 2018	2018 Winter Olympics (team event)	6; 68.49	—	10
17-20 January 2018	2018 European Championships	1; 75.52	4; 134.65	4; 210.17
17-19 November 2017	2017 Internationaux de France	2; 73.18	1; 141.14	2; 214.32
27–29 October 2017	2017 Skate Canada International	3; 73.04	2; 141.33	3; 214.37
20-23 September 2017	2017 CS Autumn Classic International	2; 73.48	1; 137.00	1; 210.48
2016–17 season
Date	Event	SP	FS	Total
20-23 April 2017	2017 World Team Trophy	1; 75.72	1; 146.87	1P/6T; 222.59
29 March – 2 April 2017	2017 World Championships	10; 70.10	6; 134.58	8; 204.68
25–29 January 2017	2017 European Championships	2; 74.18	3; 145.84	3; 220.02
15–17 December 2016	2016 French Championships	1; 68.17	1; 130.26	1; 198.43
11-13 November 2016	2016 Trophée de France	4; 66.05	2; 132.53	3; 198.58
21-23 October 2016	2016 Skate America	4; 65.78	7; 108.87	4; 174.65
29 September - 1 October 2016	2016 CS Autumn Classic International	3; 65.58	2; 133.32	2; 198.90
2015–16 season
Date	Event	SP	FS	Total
26 March - 3 April 2016	2016 World Championships	9; 66.69	10; 119.14	10; 185.83
9-13 March 2016	2016 Cup of Tyrol	2; 60.14	2; 113.14	2; 173.28
25-31 January 2016	2016 European Championships	5; 62.10	5; 123.45	4; 185.55
17–19 December 2015	2015 French Championships	1; 68.13	1; 130.63	1; 198.76
27-29 November 2015	2016 NHK Trophy	6; 61.91	4; 118.29	6; 180.20
13-15 November 2015	2015 Trophée Éric Bompard^{C}	2; 65.75	—	2; 65.75
23-26 September 2015	2015 Nebelhorn Trophy	3; 58.34	3; 113.84	3; 172.18
2014–15 season
Date	Event	SP	FS	FS
16-19 April 2015	2015 World Team Trophy	5; 58.66	5; 109.31	5P/6T; 167.97
23-29 March 2015	2015 World Championships	12; 58.28	8; 119.06	9; 177.34
4-14 February 2015	2015 Winter Universiade	4; 57.28	3; 110.91	3; 168.19
26 January - 1 February 2015	2015 European Championships	3; 60.13	6; 107.16	5; 167.29
18–21 December 2014	2014 French Championships	1; 59.40	1; 112.12	1; 171.52
21-23 November 2014	2014 Trophée Éric Bompard	5; 54.20	5; 113.68	5; 167.88
31 October - 2 November 2014	2014 Skate Canada International	5; 56.47	5; 105.32	5; 161.79
24-27 September 2014	2014 Nebelhorn Trophy	4; 55.18	4; 108.97	4; 164.15
2013–14 season
Date	Event	SP	FS	Total
24-30 March 2014	2014 World Championships	9; 64.01	8; 119.89	10; 183.90
6-22 February 2014	2014 Winter Olympics	10; 65.36	11; 114.07	10; 179.43
11-12 February 2014	2014 Winter Olympics (Team Event)	7; 57.45	—	6
13-19 January 2013	2014 European Championships	6; 63.23	5; 122.25	5; 185.48
12–15 December 2013	2013 French Championships	1; 62.14	1; 115.04	1; 177.18
28 November - 1 December 2013	2013 Denkova-Staviski Cup	1; 56.66	1; 109.99	1; 166.65
15-17 November 2013	2013 Trophée Éric Bompard	5; 56.78	4; 115.49	5; 172.27
2012–13 season
Date	Event	SP	FS	Total
11-14 April 2013	2013 World Team Trophy	3; 58.73	4; 115.58	4P/6T; 174.31
10-17 March 2013	2013 World Championships	8; 60.98	8; 119.19	8; 180.17
21-24 February 2013	2013 Challenge Cup	1; 65.41	1; 124.41	1; 189.82
23-27 February 2013	2013 European Championships	4; 59.27	4; 119.54	4; 178.81
13–16 December 2012	2012 French Championships	1; 58.21	1; 103.80	1; 162.01
4-9 December 2012	2012 NRW Trophy	2; 60.49	3; 110.54	3; 171.03
16-18 November 2012	2012 Trophée Éric Bompard	7; 51.44	4; 112.21	6; 163.65
19-21 October 2012	2012 Skate America	4; 55.76	4; 111.90	4; 167.66
27-29 September 2012	2012 Nebelhorn Trophy	3; 55.00	4; 96.52	3; 151.52
2011–12 season
Date	Event	SP	FS	Total
26 March - 1 April 2012	2012 World Championships	13; 50.51	16; 80.19	16; 130.70
23-29 January 2012	2012 European Championships	8; 51.81	6; 100.12	6; 151.93
16–18 December 2011	2011 French Championships	1; 53.84	2; 74.99	2; 128.83
18-20 November 2011	2011 Trophée Éric Bompard	8; 44.86	7; 88.45	8; 133.31
26-30 October 2011	2011 Cup of Nice	5; 51.12	5; 92.75	5; 143.87
29 September - 2 October 2011	2011 Ondrej Nepela	5; 35.00	5; 90.93	5; 125.93

- ^C - Event cancelled due to the attacks in Paris.
