= Alex Kam =

South Korean figure skater (born 1995)

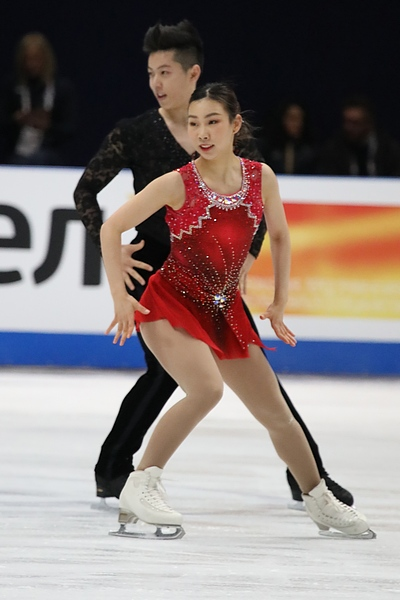
- Kim/Kam at the 2018 World Championships

Personal information
- Native name: 감강찬
- Full name: Alex Kang-chan Kam
- Other names: Kam Kang-chan
- Born: 23 May 1995 (age 31) Queenstown, New Zealand
- Home town: Seoul, South Korea
- Height: 1.72 m (5 ft 8 in)

Figure skating career
- Country: South Korea
- Coach: Bruno Marcotte, Ian Connolly
- Began skating: 2004

- Alex Kam
- Hangul: 감강찬
- Hanja: 甘強燦
- RR: Gam Gangchan
- MR: Kam Kangch'an

Alex Kam (born 23 May 1995), also known by his Korean name Kam Kang-chan (Korean: 감강찬) is a South Korean figure skater. He has represented South Korea at the 2018 Winter Olympics. As a single skater, he competed in the free skate at the 2012 Four Continents Championships. In 2015, he switched to pair skating, teaming up with Kim Kyu-eun in 2016.

== Personal life ==
Alex Kang-chan Kam was born on 23 May 1995, in Queenstown, New Zealand. He is the elder brother of Korean ice dancer Richard Kang-in Kam.

== Career ==
=== Single skating ===
In the 2011–12 season, Kam made his international senior debut at the 2011 NRW Trophy. He was assigned to the 2012 Four Continents Championships and finished 17th in his first ISU Championship appearance.

In the following year, Kam performed at the opening ceremony of the 2013 Special Olympics World Winter Games, titled "Dream of Snowman".

In the 2013–14 season, Kam placed first in the junior men's event at the Asian Figure Skating Trophy, held in Bangkok, Thailand. It was his first medal at an ISU sanctioned competition.

=== Pairs ===
Following the 2014–15 season, Kam switched to pair skating with Kim Ye-ri. The duo won the Korean test competition for the ISU Junior Grand Prix (JGP) selection in August, and they were granted two assignments. In September, they made their international debut at the JGP in Colorado Springs, Colorado, placing 6th at the competition.

Kam and Kim Kyu-eun debuted internationally at the Sarajevo Open in early February 2016. The following season, they moved up to the senior level, placing 5th at the 2016 CS Autumn Classic International, and participated in the 2017 Four Continents Championships. During the 2017–2018 season, they participated in the 2018 Winter Olympics and in the 2018 World Figure Skating Championships.

== Programs ==
=== With Kim Kyu-eun ===
Season	Short program	Free skating
2016–2018	Historia de un Amor	The Impossible Dream

=== With Kim Ye-ri ===
Season	Short program	Free skating
2015–2016	Whiplash by Justin Hurwitz; Baccano! by Makoto Yoshimori	Amélie by Yann Tiersen

=== Single skating ===
Season	Short program	Free skating
2013–2014	Tango de los Exilados performed by Vanessa-Mae	Fairy Tail by Yasuharu Takanashi; Libiamo ne' lieti calici (from La traviata) by Giuseppe Verdi
2012–2013	Kashmir by Led Zeppelin	Libiamo ne' lieti calici (from La traviata) by Giuseppe Verdi
2011–2012	Kashmir by Led Zeppelin	Jazz mix: Calloway Boogie; Minnie the Moocher; Come on with the "Come On" by Big Bad Voodoo Daddy
2010–2011	La Bohemia by Tango Consipracy	Jazz mix: Calloway Boogie; Minnie the Moocher; Come on with the "Come On" by Big Bad Voodoo Daddy

== Competitive highlights ==
CS: Challenger Series; JGP: Junior Grand Prix

=== Pairs with Kim Kyu-eun ===
International
Event	2015–16	2016–17	2017–18
Olympics			22nd
World Champ.			26th
Four Continents		15th	WD
CS Autumn Classic		5th	5th
Asian Games		5th	
Cup of Nice			3rd
International: Junior
Bavarian Open	5th J		
Sarajevo Open	1st J		
National
South Korean Champ.		3rd	1st
Team events
Olympics			9th T 10th P
J = Junior level; TBD = Assigned

=== Pairs with Kim Ye-ri ===
International
Event	2015–16
JGP United States	6th
JGP Austria	12th
National
South Korean Champ.	

=== Single skating ===
International
Event	2010–11	2011–12	2012–13	2013–14
Four Continents		17th		
NRW Trophy		16th		
International: Junior
Asian Trophy		6th J		1st J
National
South Korean Champ.	2nd J	2nd J	4th	6th
J = Junior level

== Detailed results ==
=== Pairs with Kyu-eun Kim ===
2017–2018 season
Date	Event	SP	FS	Total
14–23 February 2018	2018 Winter Olympics (pairs)	22; 42.93	–	22; 42.93
9–12 February 2018	2018 Winter Olympics (team event)	10; 52.10	–	9^{T}
22–28 January 2018	2018 Four Continents Championships	WD	WD	WD
5–7 January 2018	2018 South Korean Championships	1; 51.88	1; 87.66	1; 139.54
11–15 October 2017	2017 International Cup of Nice	4; 53.43	3; 102.83	3; 156.26
20–23 September 2017	2017 CS Autumn Classic	6; 55.02	5; 94.70	5; 149.72
10–13 August 2017	2017 Québec Summer Championships	7; 50.66	6; 91.76	6; 142.42
2016–2017 season
Date	Event	SP	FS	Total
23–26 February 2017	2017 Asian Winter Games	6; 46.64	5; 95.24	5; 141.88
15–19 February 2017	2017 Four Continents Championships	15; 41.06	15; 77.85	15; 118.91
6–8 January 2017	2017 South Korean Championships	1; 49.30	3; 78.27	3; 127.57
28 September – 1 October 2016	2016 CS Autumn Classic	5; 43.88	5; 79.36	5; 123.24

2015–2016 season
Date	Event	Level	SP	FS	Total
17–21 February 2016	Bavarian Open	Junior	4; 41.06	6; 61.92	5; 102.98
4–7 February 2016	Sarajevo Open	Junior	1; 39.26	1; 80.76	1; 120.02

=== with Kim Ye-ri ===
2015–2016 season
Date	Event	Level	SP	FS	Total	Ref
9–13 September 2015	2015 JGP Austria	Junior	12; 32.89	11; 65.66	12; 98.55	
2–5 September 2015	2015 JGP United States	Junior	3; 46.46	6; 78.10	6; 124.56	

=== Single skating ===
2013–2014 season
Date	Event	Level	SP	FS	Total	Ref
3–5 January 2014	2014 South Korean Championships	Senior	6; 56.66	7; 108.08	6; 164.74	
8–11 August 2013	2013 Asian Figure Skating Trophy	Junior	1; 56.53	1; 106.92	1; 163.45	
2012–2013 season
Date	Event	Level	SP	FS	Total	Ref
2–6 January 2013	2013 South Korean Championships	Junior	6; 41.80	4; 94.82	4; 136.62	
2011–2012 season
Date	Event	Level	SP	FS	Total	Ref
7–12 February 2012	2012 Four Continents Championships	Senior	16; 52.12	15; 101.95	17; 154.07	
4–8 January 2012	2012 South Korean Championships	Junior	2; 44.80	2; 83.01	2; 127.81	
29 November – 4 December 2011	2011 NRW Trophy	Junior	13; 49.43	20; 78.73	16; 128.30	
29 November – 4 December 2011	2011 Asian Trophy	Junior	7; 36.09	6; 80.07	6; 116.16	
2010–2011 season
Date	Event	Level	SP	FS	Total	Ref
12–16 January 2011	2011 South Korean Championships	Junior	2; 45.41	2; 83.97	2; 129.38	
