= Marie-Jade Lauriault =

Canadian-French ice dancer (born 1996)

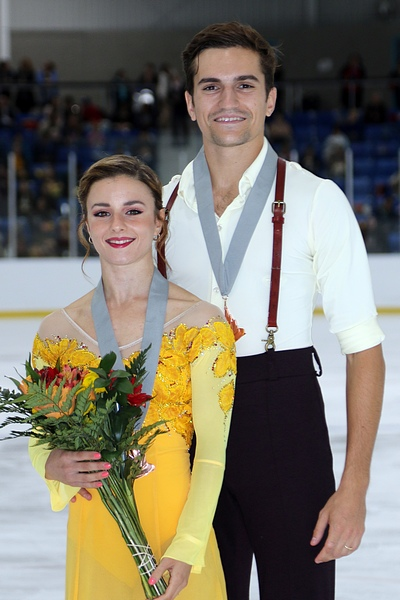
- Marie-Jade Lauriault and Romain Le Gac at the 2019 CS Autumn Classic International

Personal information
- Born: 10 November 1996 (age 30) Laval, Quebec, Canada
- Home town: Sainte-Anne-des-Plaines, Quebec
- Height: 1.50 m (4 ft 11 in)

Figure skating career
- Country: Canada
- Partner: Romain Le Gac
- Coach: Scott Moir; Madison Hubbell; Adrián Díaz; Romain Haguenauer; Patrice Lauzon; Pascal Denis; Marie-France Dubreuil; Josée Piché; Benjamin Brisebois
- Skating club: CSG Lyon
- Began skating: 2001

Marie-Jade Lauriault (born 10 November 1996) is a Canadian-French ice dancer who currently represents Canada. With her partner and husband Romain Le Gac, she is the 2022 Skate America bronze medallist, a four-time Challenger Series medallist, and a three-time Canadian national medallist. She represented Canada at the 2026 Winter Olympics.

Lauriault and Le Gac initially represented his birth country of France upon partnering in 2014, where they were four-time French national silver medallists (2015-19), four-time Challenger Series medallists and the 2016 French junior national champions, and represented France at the 2018 Winter Olympics before switching to represent Canada in the summer of 2021.

== Personal life ==
Marie-Jade Lauriault was born on 10 November 1996 in Laval, Quebec. She married Le Gac in December 2015. As of August 2016, she is studying psychology. She became a French citizen in December 2017.

== Career ==
=== Early years ===
Lauriault started skating in 2001. At the age of eight, she began taking ice dancing lessons taught by Pascal Denis and was soon paired with Pierre-Richard Chiasson. Lauriault/Chiasson placed eighth at the novice level at the 2013 Canadian Championships.

=== 2014–15 season: Debut of Lauriault/Le Gac ===
In July 2014, Lauriault was paired with French skater Romain Le Gac, who had just moved to Canada. The two decided to represent France. They are coached by Romain Haguenauer, Patrice Lauzon, Pascal Denis, and Marie-France Dubreuil in Montreal.

Lauriault/Le Gac competed on the senior level in the 2014–15 season. They won silver at the Open d'Andorra and finished ninth at the 2014 CS Golden Spin of Zagreb before taking silver at the French Championships.

=== 2015–16 season: International junior season ===
Lauriault/Le Gac decided to compete on the junior level in 2015–16. They won two medals on the Junior Grand Prix (JGP) series — silver in Linz, Austria and gold in Logroño, Spain. Their results gave them a spot at the JGP Final in Barcelona, where they finished fifth.

In February 2016, Lauriault/Le Gac won gold at the French Junior Championships ahead of Abachkina/Thauron. In March, they represented France at the 2016 World Junior Championships in Debrecen, Hungary, and won a small bronze medal after placing third in the short dance. They finished eighth overall. Over eight days in April, they skated in ten ice shows in France.

=== 2016–17 season: Grand Prix, European and World debuts ===
Returning to the senior ranks for the pre-Olympic season, Lauriault/Le Gac placed fifth at the 2016 CS Autumn Classic International. They were then invited to make their senior Grand Prix debut, finishing sixth at both the 2016 NHK Trophy and the 2017 Internationaux de France.

After winning silver at the French championships for the second time at the senior level, Lauriault/Le Gac made their European Championship debut at the 2017 edition in Ostrava, coming twelfth. They won gold at the Cup of Nice before making their World Championship debut in Helsinki, finishing twenty-first in the rhythm dance and thereby narrowly missing the cut for the free dance. They were also invited to participate as part of Team France at the World Team Trophy, finishing sixth among dance teams while France also came sixth overall.

=== 2017–18 season: Pyeongchang Olympics ===
Sixth at the Autumn Classic to start the season, Lauriault/Le Gac were eighth at both the 2017 NHK Trophy and the 2017 Rostelecom Cup on the Grand Prix. They won silver at the French championships for the third time and, as a result, were named to the French team for the 2018 Winter Olympics in Pyeongchang. They finished twelfth at the 2018 European Championships shortly afterward.

French national champions Papadakis/Cizeron declined to participate in the Olympic team event, allowing Lauriault/Le Gac to do so. They finished sixth in the rhythm dance segment, but Team France was tenth among ten teams after the first round and did not advance to the free portion of the competition. They then participated in the ice dance event, qualifying to the free dance and finishing seventeenth in their Olympic debut. Lauriault/Le Gac finished the season with a thirteenth-place finish at the post-Olympic World Championships in Milan.

=== 2018–19 season: Challenger medals ===
Lauriault/Le Gac won two medals on the Challenger series to begin the season, taking the bronze at both the 2018 CS Finlandia Trophy and the 2018 CS Inge Solar Memorial. On the Grand Prix, they finished fourth at the 2018 Skate Canada International, 6.65 points behind bronze medallists Gilles/Poirier of Canada. They were then sixth on home ice at the 2018 Internationaux de France.

French national silver medallists once again, Lauriault/Le Gac were tenth at the 2019 European Championships and fourteenth at the 2019 World Championships in Saitama.

=== 2019–20 season: Struggles ===
After a bronze medal win at the 2019 CS Autumn Classic International, Lauriault/Le Gac struggled in the early going, coming eighth at both the 2019 Skate America and the 2019 Internationaux de France. They won gold at the 2019 CS Warsaw Cup, their first Challenger title, but came fourth at the French championships and thus did not make the European Championship team. They were assigned to compete at the 2020 World Championships, to be held in Montreal near their training centre, but the event was cancelled due to the onset of the COVID-19 pandemic.

=== 2021–22 season: Switch to Canada ===
After not competing at all during the COVID-plagued 2020–21 season, Lauriault and Le Gac announced on June 6, 2021, that they would henceforth be representing her birth country of Canada. Lauriault would later say that it had been a difficult decision but that "with the pandemic, we certainly realized that we are very much at home in Canada, that our life is there. We felt that more and more as the years progressed, and Romain has established himself there as well. It is also complicated with me studying and Romain working in Canada."

After competing domestically in the fall, Lauriault/Le Gac qualified for the 2022 Canadian Championships, held without an audience in Ottawa due to the spread of the Omicron variant. They finished fifth in their first appearance at the Canadian nationals, with Lauriault saying, "it wasn't perfect, but it was what we were hoping for." Their result earned them an assignment to the 2022 Four Continents Championships in Tallinn. Competing at Four Continents, their first international event in two years, they were fifth after the rhythm dance but dropped to sixth when Lauriault fell on her twizzles in the free dance. Despite the "technical error", she insisted afterwards, "it was a great experience today; these are still good memories."

=== 2022–23 season: First Grand Prix medal ===
Beginning the season at the 2022 CS U.S. Classic, Lauriault/Le Gac finished in fourth place, 3.36 points behind American bronze medallists McNamara/Spiridonov. Given two Grand Prix assignments representing Canada for the first time, they competed first at the 2022 Skate America and won the bronze medal, their first Grand Prix medal. Le Gac said afterwards that it was a significant competition for them because they had not competed on the Grand Prix since 2019, while Lauriault called it a "life-changing experience." They then appeared at the 2022 Skate Canada International the following weekend, setting new personal bests and finishing in fifth place.

Lauriault/Le Gac won the gold medal at the 2022–23 Skate Canada Challenge to qualify to the 2023 Canadian Championships. Lauriault said of the reception of their The Pink Panther program, "we've put so much work into our choreography this year, and we are pleased people are enjoying it as much as we enjoy performing it." They went on to win the bronze medal at the Canadian Championships, albeit with reigning Canadian national champions Gilles/Poirier absent due to illness.

Despite their national bronze medal, Lauriault/Le Gac were not initially assigned to any ISU championships for the second half of the season, as Gilles/Poirier were expected to return in time. However, Gilles/Poirier subsequently withdrew from the 2023 Four Continents Championships, Lauriault/Le Gac were called up to replace them.

=== 2023–24 season ===
For their free dance for the new season, Lauriault and Le Gac chose to use the soundtrack of Tim Burton's film The Corpse Bride, which she would later say they had contemplated since their junior days, but earlier felt would be too "childish". They reconsidered after a recent rewatch of the film.

In their first outing of the season, Lauriault/Le Gac won the silver medal at the 2023 CS Budapest Trophy, their first Challenger medal while representing Canada. On the Grand Prix, they finished fifth at the 2023 Grand Prix de France. They encountered difficulties in the free dance at the 2023 NHK Trophy and came seventh there. Lauriault said that it "may not have been the performance we wanted, but we are happy that we enjoyed the moment and were present and grateful for being here."

In advance of the 2024 Canadian Championships, defending silver medalists Lajoie/Lagha withdrew due to Lajoie entering concussion protocol, whilst reigning champions Fournier Beaudry/Sørensen withdrew after the latter was revealed to be under investigation for sexual assault. The ice dance podium was thus considered more open than in recent years. Lauriault/Le Gac won the silver medal. “We’re really happy with the performance today,” said Le Gac on Saturday after the free dance. “I think we really went one step at a time. It was really nice. The audience was pretty supportive today.”

With Lajoie/Lagha still unable to compete, Lauriault/Le Gac replaced them at the 2024 Four Continents Championships in Shanghai, where they were seventh in the rhythm dance after receiving a two-point deduction for an illegal move in their rotational lift. They set a new personal best score in the free dance, coming third in that segment and winning a bronze small medal, and rising to fifth overall.

=== 2024–25 season ===
Lauriault/Le Gac started their season with a gold medal win at the 2024 Lake Placid Ice Dance International. Going on to compete on the 2024–25 Grand Prix circuit, the duo finished seventh at the 2024 Skate America, dealing with errors in the free dance. Lauriault said that it was "not the free dance we were expecting to put out their today, we were just a bit off today. I think there's a lot to learn from this competition. We're going to take everything we can and leave this weekend behind." They were seventh as well at the 2024 Grand Prix de France, with Le Gac admitting "we haven’t reached our goals yet." Later in the month of November they came fifth at the 2024 CS Warsaw Cup.

At 2025 Canadian Championships, Lauriault/Le Gac entered as prospective contenders for the bronze medal. They were fourth in the rhythm dance with a score of 78.09, 0.44 points behind fellow Ice Academy of Montreal skaters Fabbri/Ayer. They were fourth in the free dance as well, by a wider margin, and finished fourth overall.

=== 2025–26 season: Milano Cortina Olympics ===
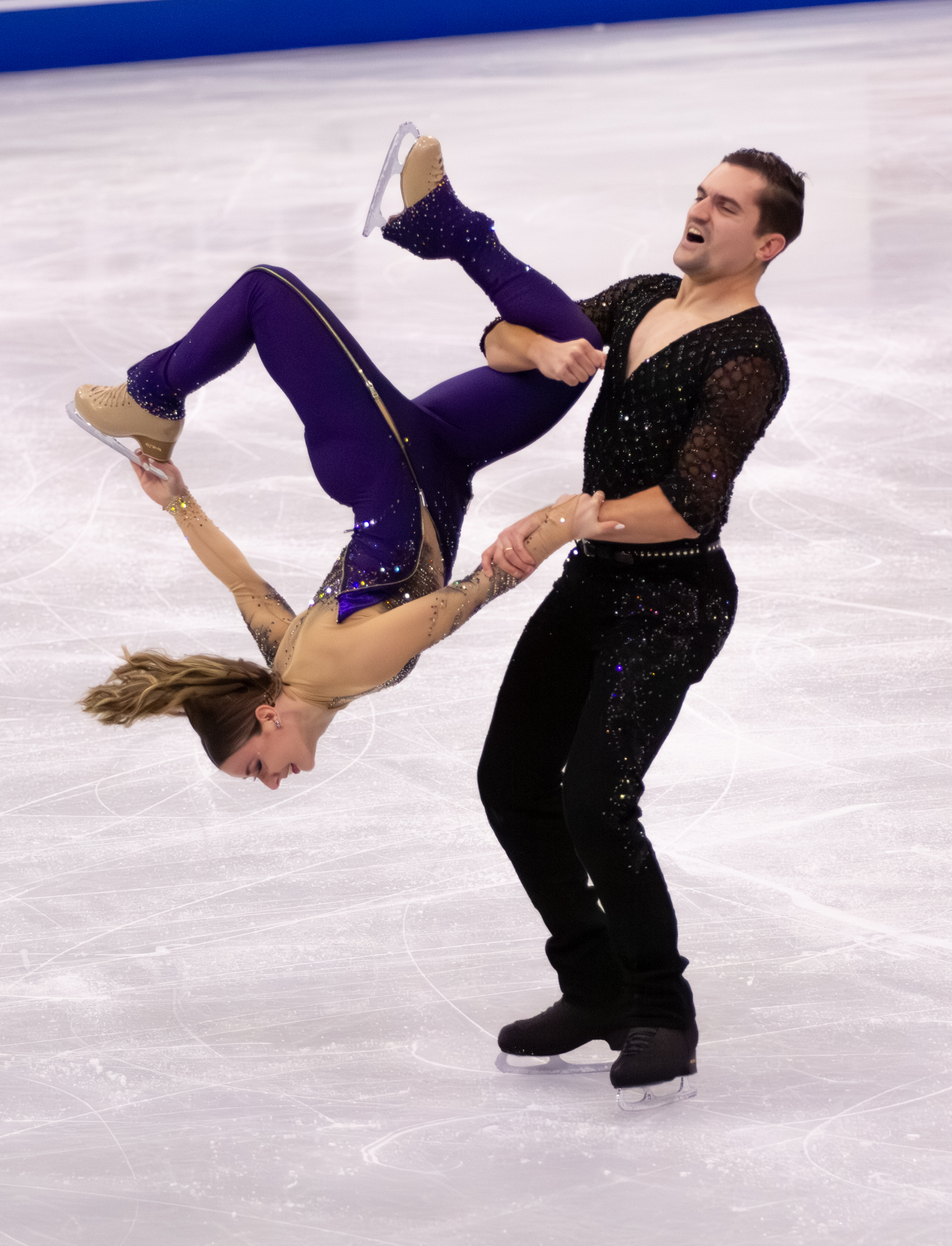
Lauriault/Le Gac performing a lift during their rhythm dance at the 2025 Skate Canada International

In August, it was announced that Lauriault/Le Gac had added Scott Moir, Madison Hubbell, and Adrián Díaz to their coaching team and would make frequent trips to London, Ontario to work with them.

The duo started the season by winning silver at the 2025 Lake Placid Ice Dance International. They then went on to compete on the 2025–26 Challenger Series, winning gold at the 2025 CS Kinoshita Group Cup and bronze at the 2025 CS Nebelhorn Trophy.

On the 2025–26 Grand Prix series, the team placed sixth at the 2025 Grand Prix de France and seventh at 2025 Skate Canada International. They followed up these results with a gold medal at the 2025 Skate Canada Challenge.

In January, Lauriault/Le Gac competed at the 2026 Canadian Championships, winning the bronze medal. "I think we're just really grateful to be able to perform like this," said Lauriault after the free dance. "It's to our training, to our coaches, the team behind us." They were subsequently named to the 2026 Winter Olympic team.

== Programs ==
=== Ice dance with Romain Le Gac ===
Season	Short dance/Rhythm dance	Free dance	Exhibition	Ref.
2014–15	"Bamboléo"; "Habla me"; "Volare" By Gipsy Kings	Rhapsody in Blue By George Gershwin	—N/a	
2015–16	Waltz: "And the Waltz Goes On" By Anthony Hopkins; Polka: "Susie (If You Knew Susie)" Both performed by André Rieu	"While My Guitar Gently Weeps" (Love remix); "Come Together"; "Dear Prudence"; "Cry Baby Cry" (Love remix) All by The Beatles	"Unforgettable" By Nat King Cole	
2016–17	"The Way You Make Me Feel" Performed by Judith Hill; "The Way You Make Me Feel" Performed by Michael Jackson Choreo by Marie-France Dubreuil & Romain Haguenauer	"Tonight"; "Sorry Seems to Be the Hardest Word" By Elton John Choreo by Marie-France Dubreuil & Romain Haguenauer	"While My Guitar Gently Weeps"; "Come Together" All by The Beatles	
2016–17	"The Way You Make Me Feel" Performed by Judith Hill; "The Way You Make Me Feel" Performed by Michael Jackson Choreo by Marie-France Dubreuil & Romain Haguenauer	"Tonight"; "Sorry Seems to Be the Hardest Word" By Elton John Choreo by Marie-France Dubreuil & Romain Haguenauer	"Can't Take My Eyes Off You"	
2017–18	"Salsation" By David Shire; "No Hay Problema" By Pink Martini	"You Take My Breath Away"; "Another One Bites the Dust" All by Queen	"Can't Take My Eyes Off You"	
2018–19	Tango: "Cell Block Tango"; Foxtrot: "Roxie" (All from Chicago) By John Kander & Fred Ebb	"Treasure"; "Talking to the Moon"; "Uptown Funk" All by Bruno Mars	"Tu t'laisses aller"; "For Me Formidable" By Charles Aznavour	
2019–20	Waltz, Foxtrot, Quickstep, Waltz: Les Demoiselles de Rochefort by Michel Legrand	Histoire Sans Paroles; En Pleine Face; Dixie by Harmonium	—N/a	
2020–21	Tango: "Cell Block Tango"; Foxtrot: "Roxie"		—N/a	
2021–22	"Downtown"; "Same Love"; "Can't Hold Us"All by Macklemore & Ryan Lewis Choreo. by Romain Haguenauer	"Some Nights" By fun. Choreo. by Romain Haguenauer	—N/a	
2022–23	Mambo: Malambo No. 1 By Yma Sumac; Rhumba: Ms. Harmony By Robin Thicke; Mambo: Mambo No. 8 By Dámaso Perez Prado Choreo by. Marie-France Dubreuil, Romain Haguenauer, Samuel Chouinard & Ginette Cournoyer	The Pink Panther By Christophe Beck Choreo. by Marie-France Dubreuil, Romain Haguenauer, Samuel Chouinard, Ginette Cournoyer	"Hawaiian Surf" By The Kalua Beach Boys; "Surfin' U.S.A." By The Beach Boys; "Surf Crazy Finale" By the Teen Beach Movie cast	
2023–24	"Need You Tonight"; "Never Tear Us Apart"; "Devil Inside" By INXS Choreo. by Marie-France Dubreuil, Romain Haguenauer, Samuel Chouinard & Ginette Cournoyer	Corpse Bride By Danny Elfman Choreo. by Marie-France Dubreuil, Romain Haguenauer, Samuel Chouinard & Ginette Cournoyer	The Pink Panther	
2024–25	"The Rich Man's Frug" (from Sweet Charity) By Cy Coleman & Dorothy Fields Performed by Christina Applegate; "The Rich Man's Frug" (from Fosse) Performed by the Fosse Ensemble Choreo.by Marie-France Dubreuil, Romain Haguenauer, Samuel Chouinard & Émilie Josset	"Man with a Harmonica" (from Once Upon a Time in the West) By Ennio Morricone; "Lone Rider"; "For the Love of Gold" By Stephan Sechi & the Hollywood Symphony Orchestra; "Devil Got You Beat" By Blues Saraceno Choreo. by Marie-France Dubreuil, Romain Haguenauer, Samuel Chouinard & Émilie Josset	"Country Girl (Shake It for Me)" by Luke Bryan	
2025–26	"Thunder"; "Cream" By Prince Choreo.by Scott Moir, Madison Hubbell, Adrián Díaz, Romain Haguenauer & Samuel Chouinard; "You Need Love Like I Do" featuring Heather Small, 7th District Radio Mix By Tom Jones; "Sex Bomb" featuring Mousse T.; "Sex Bomb" featuring Mousse T., Peppermint Disco Radio Edit By Tom Jones	"Les Pyramides"; "Astérix et Obélix: Mission Cléopâtre (Main Title)"; "Numérobis Théme" (from Astérix et Obélix : Mission Cléopâtre) By Philippe Chany; "Cleopatra's Song of the Nile" By Jeffrey Goodman; "Edony (Clap your Hands)" By Martin Solveig & Hossam Ramzy; "Alf Layla Wa Layla (Radio Edit)" By Back to Basics, Baligh Hamdi, Morsi Gamil Aziz, & Umm Kulthum Choreo.by Scott Moir, Madison Hubbell, Adrián Díaz, Romain Haguenauer & Samuel Chouinard	"Country Girl (Shake It for Me)" by Luke Bryan	
2026-27	"The Dancing Cat" By Henry Mancini; "Voices of Spring, Op. 410" By Johann Strauss II; "Glitz at the Ritz" By Jules Gaia; Choreo. by Scott Moir, Madison Hubbell, Adrian Diaz & Samuel Chouinard	"Horizon Ouverture"; "Prime (2012) Unfinished"; "Horizon (Japan CD)" By Daft Punk; Choreo. by Scott Moir, Madison Hubbell, Adrian Diaz & Samuel Chouinard		

== Competitive highlights ==
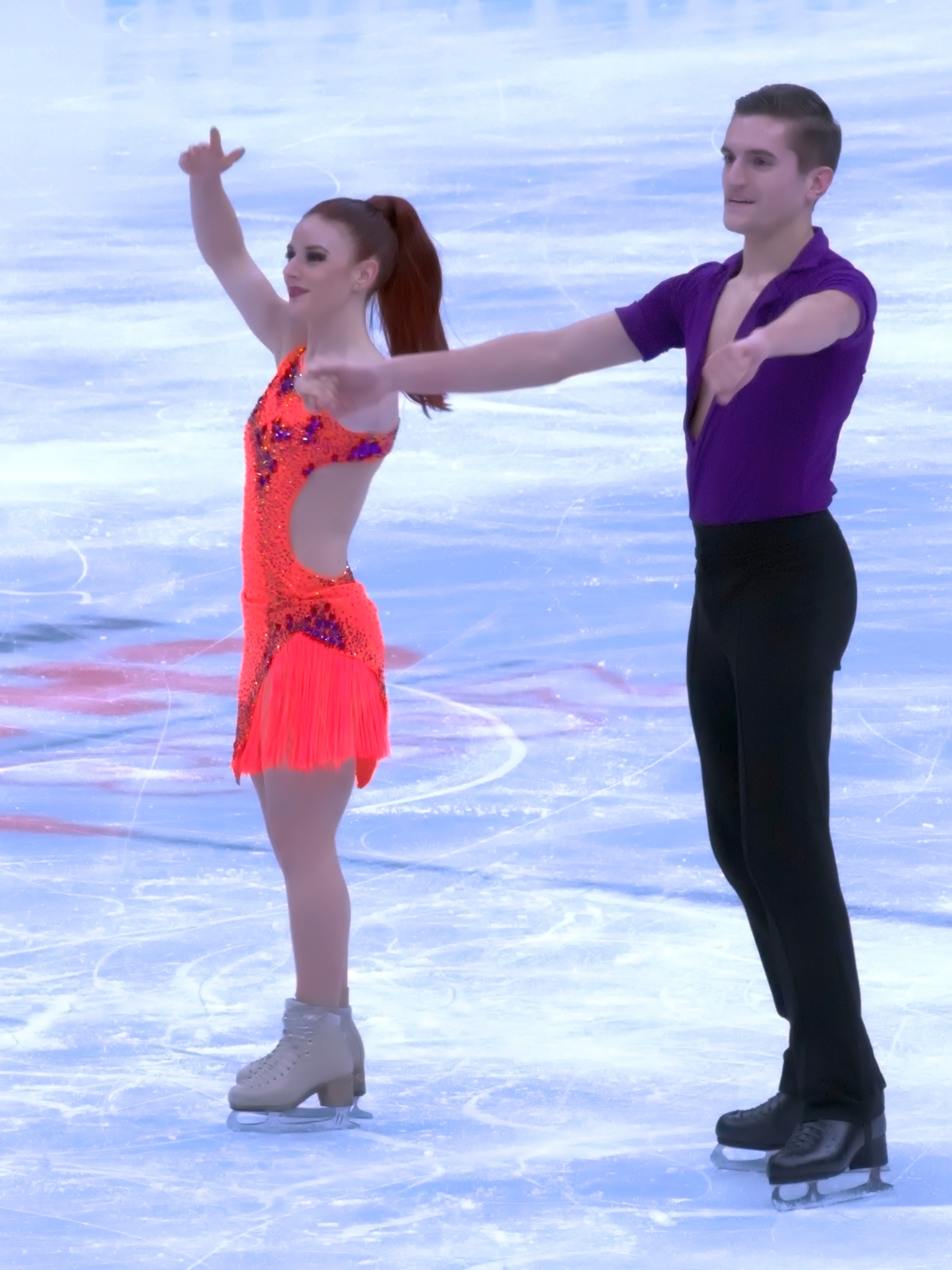
Lauriault and Le Gac at the 2018 European Championships

- GP – Event of the ISU Grand Prix Series
- JGP – Event of the ISU Junior Grand Prix Series
- CS – Event of the ISU Challenger Series
- C – Event was cancelled
- TBD – Assigned
- WD – Withdrew from competition

=== Ice dance with Romain Le Gac (for Canada) ===
Competition placements at senior level
Season	2021–22	2022–23	2023–24	2024–25	2025–26	2026-27
Winter Olympics					14th	
World Championships					13th	
Four Continents Championships	6th	6th	5th			
Canadian Championships	5th	3rd	2nd	4th	3rd	
GP Finland						TBD
GP France			5th	7th	6th	
GP NHK Trophy			7th			
GP Skate America		3rd		7th		
GP Skate Canada		5th			7th	5th
CS Budapest Trophy			2nd			
CS Kinoshita Group Cup					1st	
CS Nebelhorn Trophy					3rd	2nd
CS U.S. Classic		4th				
CS Warsaw Cup				5th		
Lake Placid Ice Dance				1st	2nd	
Skate Canada Challenge	3rd	1st			1st	

=== Ice dance with Romain Le Gac (for France) ===
Competition placements at senior level
Season	2014–15	2016–17	2017–18	2018–19	2019–20
Winter Olympics			17th		
Winter Olympics (Team event)			10th		
World Championships		21st	13th	14th	C
European Championships		12th	12th	10th	
French Championships	2nd	2nd	2nd	2nd	4th
World Team Trophy		6th (6th)			
GP France		6th		6th	8th
GP NHK Trophy		6th	8th		
GP Rostelecom Cup			8th		
GP Skate America					8th
GP Skate Canada				4th	
CS Alpen Trophy				3rd	
CS Autumn Classic		5th	6th		3rd
CS Finlandia Trophy				3rd	
CS Golden Spin of Zagreb	9th				
CS Warsaw Cup					1st
Bavarian Open					2nd
Cup of Nice		1st	3rd		
Master's de Patinage	2nd	2nd	2nd	1st	2nd
Open d'Andorra	2nd				
Shanghai Trophy			3rd		

Competition placements at junior level
Season	2015–16
World Junior Championships	8th
Junior Grand Prix Final	5th
French Championships	1st
JGP Austria	2nd
JGP Spain	1st
Master's de Patinage	1st

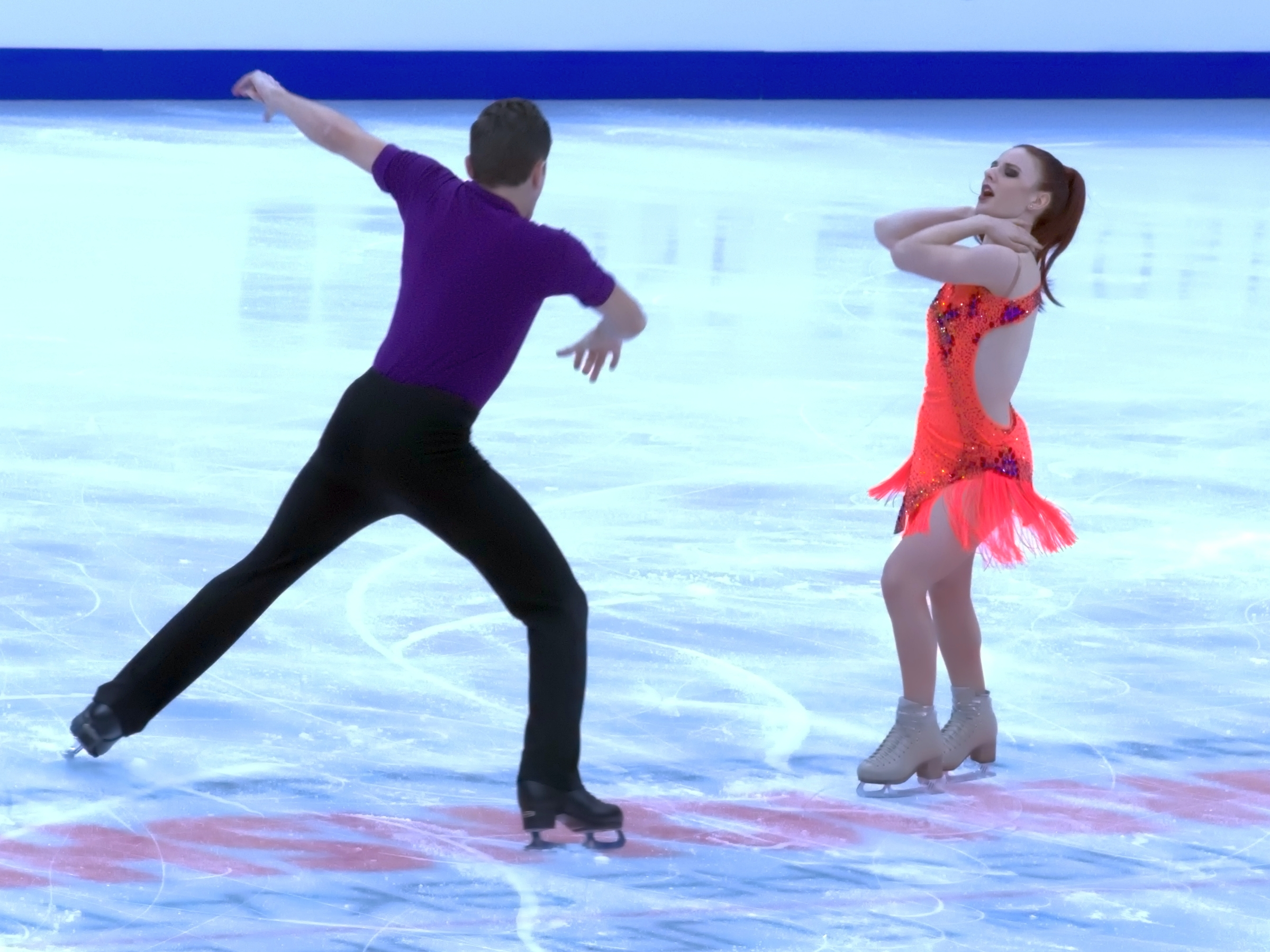
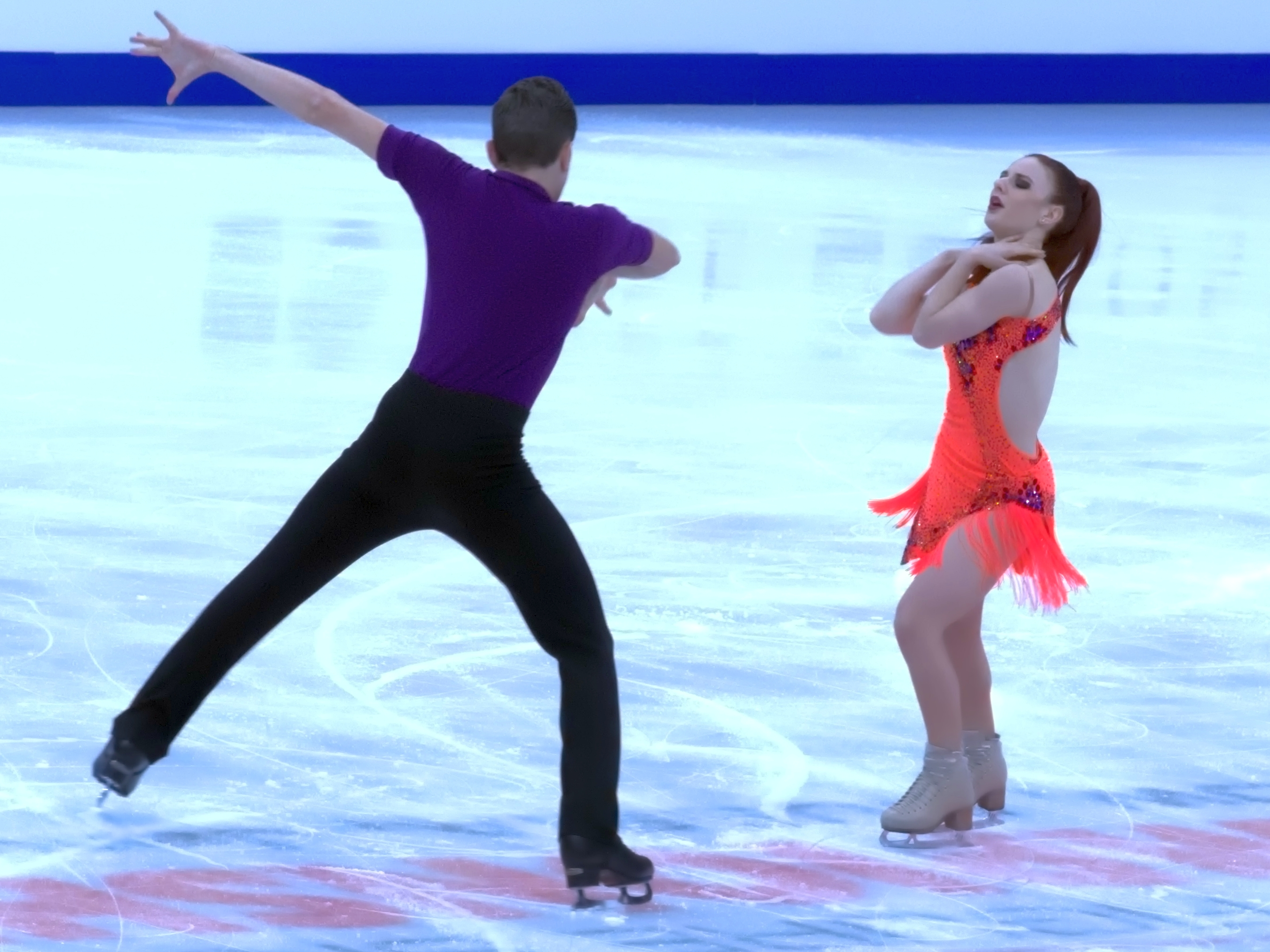
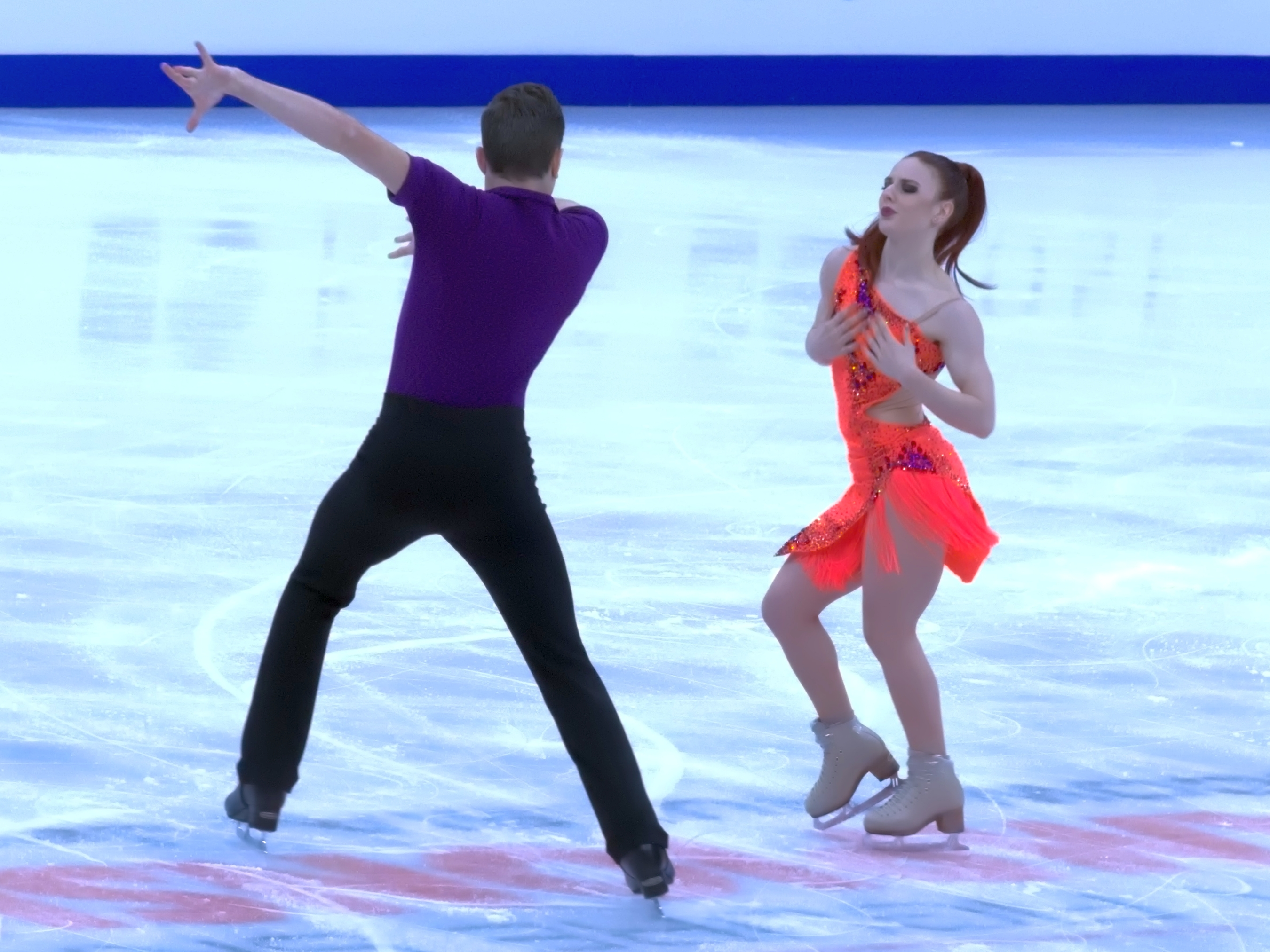
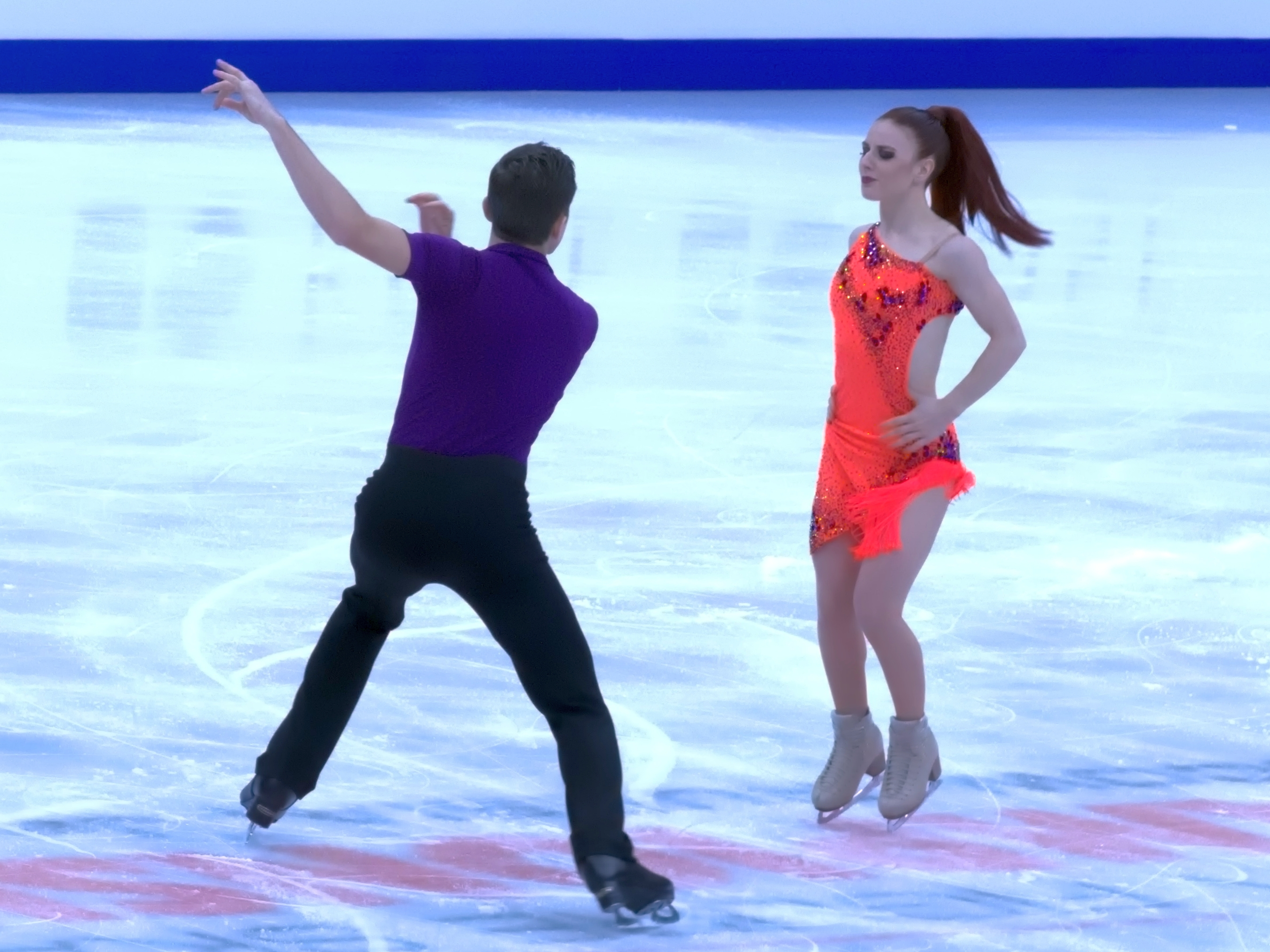
Lauriault/Le Gac at the 2018 European Figure Skating Championships in Moscow

== Detailed results ==
=== Ice dance with Romain Le Gac (for Canada) ===
ISU personal best scores in the +5/-5 GOE System
Segment	Type	Score	Event
Total	TSS	197.90	2025 CS Kinoshita Group Cup
Rhythm dance	TSS	76.40	2025 CS Kinoshita Group Cup
Rhythm dance	TES	43.94	2025 CS Kinoshita Group Cup
Rhythm dance	PCS	33.64	2024 Skate America
Free dance	TSS	121.50	2025 CS Kinoshita Group Cup
Free dance	TES	69.10	2025 CS Kinoshita Group Cup
Free dance	PCS	52.40	2025 CS Kinoshita Group Cup

Results in the 2021–22 season
Date	Event	RD		FD		Total	
Date	Event	P	Score	P	Score	P	Score
Dec 1–5, 2021	2021 Skate Canada Challenge	5	60.70	1	112.96	3	173.66
Jan 6–12, 2022	(Canada) 2022 Canadian Championships	5	71.29	4	110.45	5	181.74
Jan 18–23, 2022	(Estonia) 2022 Four Continents Championships	5	68.66	6	98.23	6	166.89

Results in the 2022–23 season
Date	Event	RD		FD		Total	
Date	Event	P	Score	P	Score	P	Score
Sep 12–16, 2022	(United States) 2022 CS U.S. International Classic	4	68.72	3	106.95	4	175.67
Oct 21–23, 2022	(United States) 2022 Skate America	3	72.12	3	106.18	3	178.30
Oct 28–30, 2022	2022 Skate Canada International	5	74.59	5	114.48	5	189.07
Nov 30 – Dec 3, 2022	2022 Skate Canada Challenge	1	78.92	1	117.83	1	196.75
Jan 9–15, 2023	(Canada) 2023 Canadian Championships	3	77.34	3	119.06	3	196.40
Feb 7–12, 2023	(United States) 2023 Four Continents Championships	8	62.03	6	109.32	6	171.35

Results in the 2023–24 season
Date	Event	RD		FD		Total	
Date	Event	P	Score	P	Score	P	Score
Oct 13-15, 2023	(Hungary) 2023 CS Budapest Trophy	2	71.92	2	116.40	2	188.32
Nov 3–5, 2023	2023 Grand Prix de France	5	70.48	5	112.13	5	182.61
Nov 24–26, 2023	(Japan) 2023 NHK Trophy	7	71.35	7	104.91	7	176.26
Jan 8–14, 2024	(Canada) 2024 Canadian Championships	2	78.00	2	122.50	2	200.50
Jan 30 – Feb 4, 2024	(China) 2024 Four Continents Championships	7	71.26	3	119.57	5	190.83

Results in the 2024–25 season
Date	Event	RD		FD		Total	
Date	Event	P	Score	P	Score	P	Score
Jul 30–31, 2024	(United States) 2024 Lake Placid Ice Dance International	1	77.28	1	113.91	1	191.19
Oct 18–20, 2024	(United States) 2024 Skate America	6	70.38	7	104.53	7	174.91
Oct 31 – Nov 3, 2024	2024 Grand Prix de France	5	72.54	8	103.31	7	175.85
Jan 14–19, 2025	(Canada) 2025 Canadian Championships	4	78.09	4	115.19	4	193.28

Results in the 2025–26 season
Date	Event	RD		FD		Total	
Date	Event	P	Score	P	Score	P	Score
July 29–31, 2025	(United States) 2025 Lake Placid Ice Dance International	2	72.50	1	114.58	2	187.08
Sep 5–7, 2025	(Japan) 2025 CS Kinoshita Group Cup	1	76.40	1	121.50	1	197.90
Sept 25–27, 2025	(Germany) 2025 CS Nebelhorn Trophy	4	68.98	3	111.19	3	180.17
Oct 17–19, 2025	2025 Grand Prix de France	6	73.75	6	112.74	6	186.49
Oct 31 – Nov 2, 2025	2025 Skate Canada International	7	70.84	6	108.57	7	179.41
Nov 27–29, 2025	2025 Skate Canada Challenge	1	75.81	1	119.84	1	195.65
Jan 5–11, 2026	(Canada) 2026 Canadian Championships	3	78.64	3	122.29	3	200.93
Feb 9-11, 2026	(Italy) 2026 Winter Olympics	15	74.35	14	112.83	14	187.18
Mar 24–29, 2026	(Czech Republic) 2026 World Championships	20	69.70	13	111.96	13	181.66

Results in the 2026–27 season
Date	Event	RD		FD		Total	
Date	Event	P	Score	P	Score	P	Score
Sep 24–26, 2026	(Germany) 2026 CS Nebelhorn Trophy	2	75.57	4	107.83	2	183.40
Oct 30 - Nov 1, 2026	2026 Skate Canada International	5	72.10	5	107.70	5	179.80
