= Keegan Messing =

Canadian-American figure skater

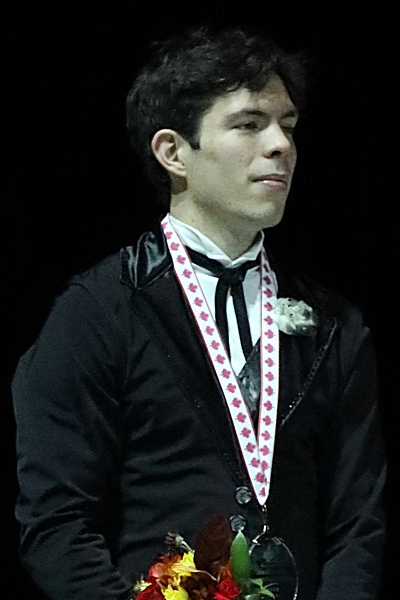
- Messing at the 2018 Skate Canada International

Personal information
- Born: January 23, 1992 (age 34) Girdwood, Alaska, U.S.
- Home town: Anchorage, Alaska, U.S.
- Height: 5 ft 5 in (1.65 m)

Figure skating career
- Country: Canada (2014–23); United States (2006–14)
- Discipline: Men's singles
- Began skating: 1995
- Highest WS: 8th (2021–22), (2020–21) & (2018–19)
Representing Canada
Four Continents Championships
Silver medal – second place	2023 Colorado Springs	Singles
Canadian Championships
Gold medal – first place	2022 Ottawa	Singles
Gold medal – first place	2023 Oshawa	Singles
Silver medal – second place	2018 Vancouver	Singles
Bronze medal – third place	2019 Saint John	Singles
Bronze medal – third place	2020 Mississauga	Singles

Keegan Messing (born January 23, 1992) is a Canadian-American figure skater. Representing Canada, he has competed at two Winter Olympic Games in 2018 and 2022. He has also appeared at three World Championships, placing as high as sixth. He is the 2023 Four Continents silver medalist, 2021 CS Golden Spin of Zagreb champion, a two-time Nebelhorn Trophy champion (2018 and 2022), and a two-time Grand Prix medalist. At the national level, he is a two time Canadian national (2022 and 2023) champion.

Previously, representing the United States, he was the two-time International Cup of Nice champion (2011, 2012) and the 2012 Nebelhorn Trophy bronze medalist. He placed fourth at the 2010 World Junior Championships.

== Personal life ==
Keegan Messing was born on January 23, 1992, in Girdwood, Alaska. He has two brothers, Paxon and Tanner; Paxon was killed in a motorcycle accident at age 26, in 2019. Keegan holds dual U.S. and Canadian citizenship; his mother was born in Edmonton, Alberta, and he is a great-great-grandson of Manzo Nagano, the first Japanese person to officially immigrate to Canada. His father is a firefighter.

In October 2018, he became engaged to his girlfriend Lane Hodson. Messing and Hodson married in the summer of 2019. Their son Wyatt was born in July 2021. Their daughter Mia was born in January 2023.

== Career ==
=== Early career ===
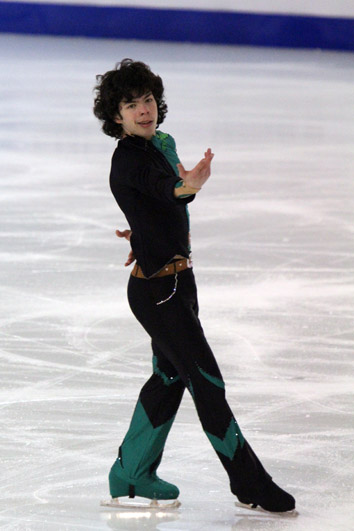
Messing at the 2010 World Junior Championships

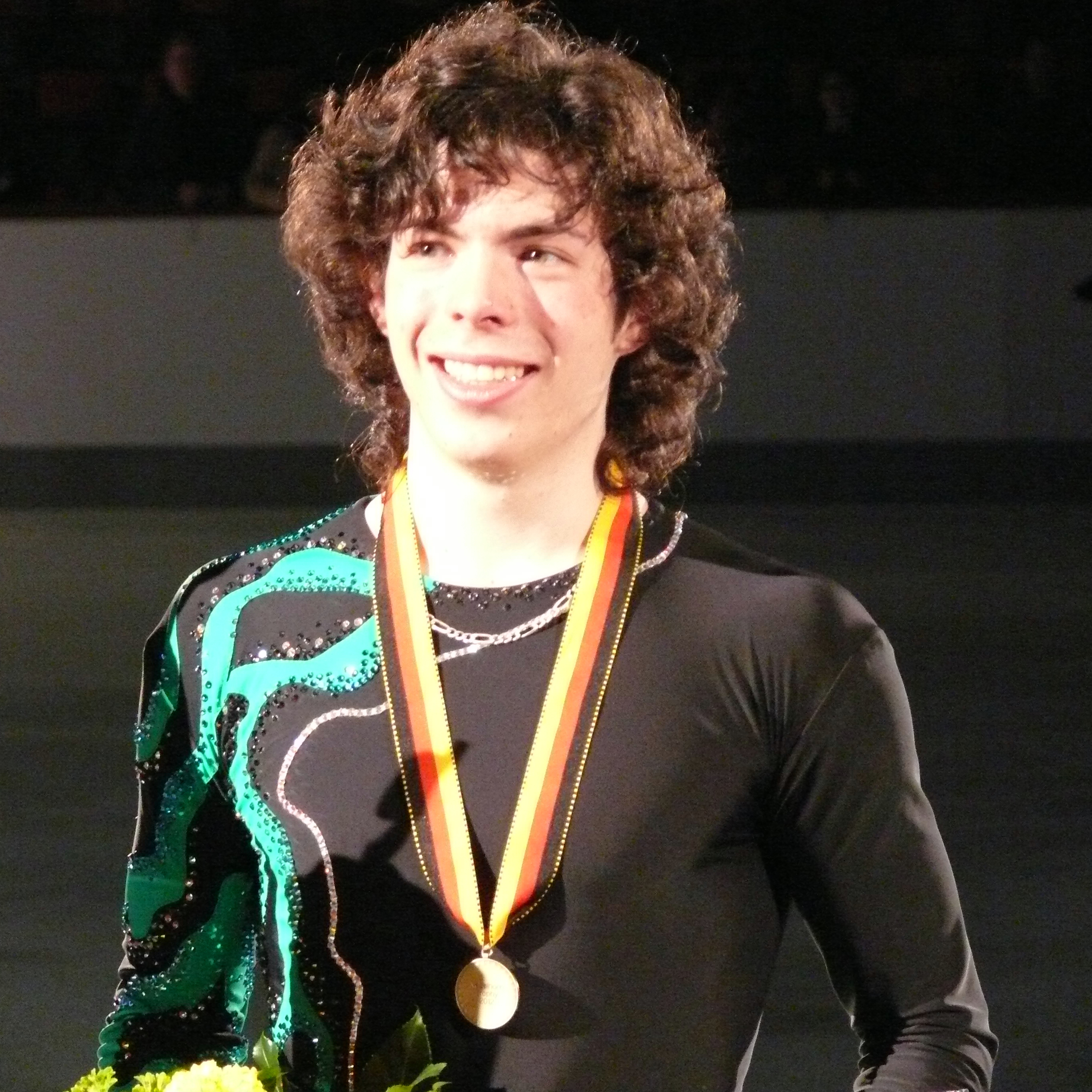
Messing at the 2012 Nebelhorn Trophy

Messing started skating at age 3 after watching the 1994 Winter Olympics in Lillehammer. Naming Elvis Stojko as his biggest influence, Messing said: "Watching him skate made me want to skate". In addition to singles, Messing formerly competed in pair skating with Ellie Gottstein.

Anne Durham coached Messing from 1995 to 1999. He is now coached by Ralph Burghardt in Anchorage, Alaska.

Messing won the junior silver medal at the 2009 U.S. Championships. The following season, he made his senior national debut, finishing ninth. He finished eighth at the 2011 U.S. Nationals.

Messing won the 2011 Coupe de Nice after placing first in the short program and fourth in the free. He then placed seventh at the 2012 U.S. Nationals, which would be his highest placement as an American senior. He won the bronze medal at the 2012 Nebelhorn Trophy, and repeated as the victor at the 2012 Coupe de Nice.

At the 2013 U.S. Nationals, Messing placed sixteenth, followed by a twelfth-place finish the following year.

In July 2014, Messing said that he would begin competing for Canada. In the 2014–15 season, he won bronze at the Skate Canada Challenge and qualified for the 2015 Canadian Championships. He placed fifth at Nationals, representing a club in Sherwood Park, Alberta.

In the 2015–16 season, Messing placed fifth at the 2015 CS Ondrej Nepela Trophy and eleventh at the 2015 Skate Canada International, his senior Grand Prix debut. He went on to place sixth at the 2016 Canadian Championships.

The 2016–17 season saw Messing compete at two Challenger events, placing fourth at the 2016 CS Autumn Classic International and winning a bronze medal at the 2016 CS Golden Spin of Zagreb. He again placed fifth at the 2017 Canadian Championships.

=== 2017–2018 season: Olympic and Worlds debut ===
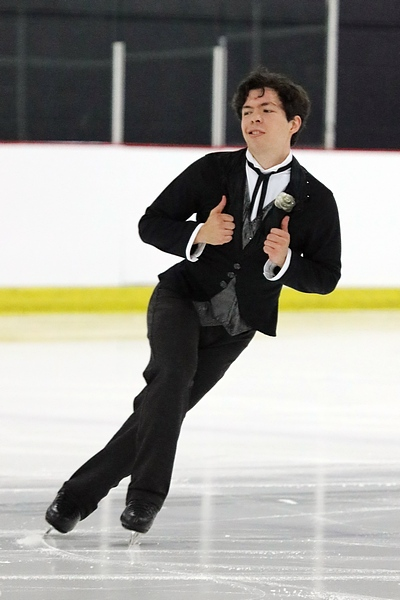
Messing at the 2017 CS Autumn Classic International

Messing began the Olympic season at the 2017 CS Autumn Classic International, where he won the bronze medal behind Javier Fernandez and Yuzuru Hanyu. Competing on the Grand Prix circuit, he placed eighth at the 2017 Skate Canada International and fifth at the 2017 NHK Trophy.

Competing at the 2018 Canadian Championships that would decide the nation's delegation to the 2018 Winter Olympics, Messing placed third in both the short program and free skate, winning the silver medal behind Patrick Chan. Messing was named along with Chan to the Olympic team, as well as to the 2018 World Championships team alongside national bronze medallist Nam Nguyen.

Competing at the 2018 Winter Olympics in PyeongChang, South Korea, Messing finished twelfth overall. At his World Championships debut, Messing placed sixth in the short program with a new personal best score, qualifying for the final flight of the free skate. Messing placed eleventh in the free skate following errors for an eighth-place finish overall.

=== 2018–2019 season: Challenger gold, Grand Prix silver ===
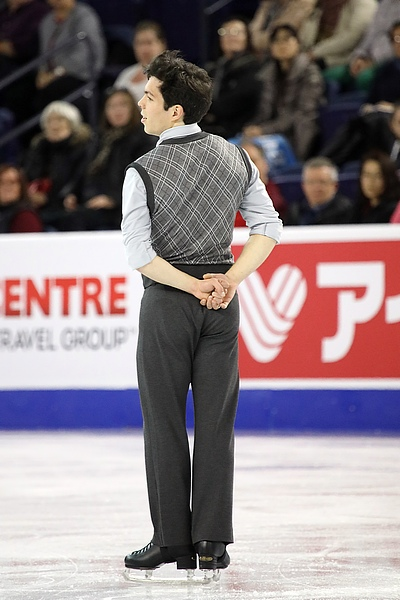
Messing at the 2018 Skate Canada International

Beginning the season at the 2018 CS Nebelhorn Trophy, Messing placed first in both segments to win the gold medal, his first international win while representing Canada.

Competing on the Grand Prix, Messing placed first in the short program at the 2018 Skate Canada International, following mistakes by presumed frontrunner Shoma Uno. He then placed second in the free skate, behind Uno, to win the silver medal overall, his first Grand Prix medal. At the 2018 Rostelecom Cup, he placed fifth, having placed seventh in the short program and sixth in the free program. He was initially named as the first alternate to the Grand Prix Final and was subsequently called up following the withdrawal of Yuzuru Hanyu due to injury.

At the Final, Messing underrotated two jumps in the short program, placing sixth. He moved up to fifth place in the free skate, despite falling on a triple Axel and doubling a planned quadruple toe loop. Messing landed the quad Lutz in competition for the first time, the second Canadian skater to do so after Stephen Gogolev.

At the 2019 Canadian Championships, Messing was considered a favourite going in but struggled in both programs. In the short program, he placed second behind Gogolev, despite falling on his opening quad attempt. The free skate was also a challenge, and he dropped to third place, winning the bronze medal behind Nguyen and Gogolev. He was named to the Canadian teams for the Four Continents and World Championships.

At the 2019 Four Continents Championships, Messing placed fifth in the short program after rough landings on his triple Axel and triple Lutz jumps. He then placed third in the free program with a personal best score, winning a small bronze medal and placing fourth overall. At the 2019 World Championships, Messing placed fifteenth after two error-riddled programs. The placements of Messing and Nguyen meant that Canada would have only one men's berth at the 2020 World Championships. Messing concluded the season at the 2019 World Team Trophy, where he placed sixth overall among the twelve men, including a fourth-place free skate that featured only one error.

=== 2019–2020 season ===
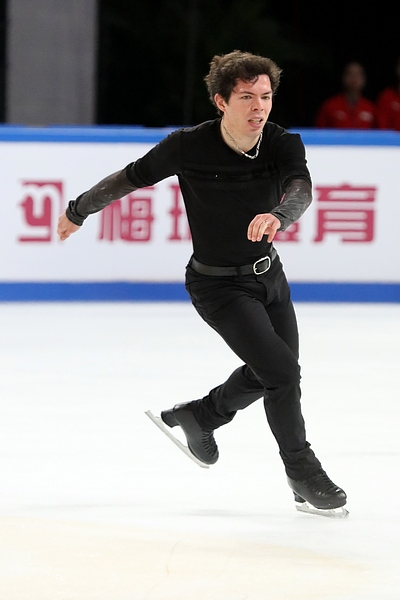
Messing at the 2019 Cup of China

Messing selected "Perfect" as his short program music for the season in commemoration of his marriage, the song having been the first dance at his wedding. His first competition of the season was the 2019 CS Autumn Classic International, where he won the bronze medal with third-place finishes in both segments. Messing held the Japanese flag in aid of the event's winner, Yuzuru Hanyu, during the medal ceremony and was praised in the media for an example of good sportsmanship.

Messing's younger brother Paxon was killed in a road accident days after the Autumn Classic. Messing opted to compete on the Grand Prix a few weeks later. Messing placed third in the short program at 2019 Skate America, fractions of a point behind Dmitri Aliev, and set a new personal best. He struggled in the free skate, placing eighth and dropping to fourth place overall. Messing performed a tribute to Paxon at the Skate America gala, saying it felt like "a last goodbye." At his second Grand Prix, the 2019 Cup of China, he was fifth in the short program after falling on his quad toe loop and performing only a double Axel instead of a triple. He was third in the free skate and finished fourth overall.

Making only an error on his final triple Lutz, Messing placed first in the short program at the 2020 Canadian Championships. He struggled in the free skate, falling on both his attempted quad jumps and making a number of other errors, and dropped to third place overall behind Roman Sadovsky and Nguyen. Skate Canada assigned all three podium finishers to compete at the 2020 Four Continents Championships, declining for the time being to fill Canada's one berth at the 2020 World Championships.

At Four Continents, Messing placed fourth in the short program with a clean program, which he cited as especially meaningful given his six-month wedding anniversary. He struggled in the free skate, making several jump errors that dropped him to eighth place overall, with Nguyen, the highest-finishing Canadian skater, at sixth.

=== 2020–2021 season: Pandemic ===
The onset of the coronavirus pandemic disrupted Messing's normal plans, including touring and spending time in Canada with choreographers and the national team. He was assigned to the 2020 Skate America event on the Grand Prix circuit, following the decision of the ISU to base assignments largely on training location. Following the cancellation of the 2020 Skate Canada International event due to the pandemic and teammate Stephen Gogolev's withdrawal from Skate America, Messing was the only Canadian skater remaining with a Grand Prix assignment that year. Messing placed third in the short program despite putting a hand down on his open quadruple jump and stumbling in his footwork. Delivering a strong free skate with only two minor jump errors, he won the bronze medal, his second Grand Prix medal, which he dedicated to his fellow Canadian skaters who were unable to compete on the Grand Prix.

Due to the difficulty of hosting in-person events, the 2021 Canadian Championships were cancelled. Messing also did not participate in the 2021 Skate Canada Challenge, a virtual qualifying competition.

On February 25, Messing was announced as Canada's lone men's entry to the 2021 World Championships in Stockholm. The stakes for his performance were high, as this was the primary qualifier for the 2022 Winter Olympics in Beijing and the only means for a country to earn more than one berth per discipline, which Messing would later call "quite a heavy burden." Messing placed fifth in the short program with a clean skate. In the free skate, he made only two errors at the end of the program, stepping out of a triple Axel and doubling a planned triple flip. He was sixth in that segment and placed sixth overall. His performance guaranteed Canada one men's entry to the Olympics and the opportunity to qualify for a second one at the 2021 Nebelhorn Trophy.

=== 2021–2022 season: National title and Beijing Olympics ===
In celebration of the birth of his son Wyatt, Messing selected "Home" by Phillip Phillips for his free program music.

Messing made his season debut at the 2021 CS Finlandia Trophy, where he placed first in the short program. He struggled in the free skate, placing seventh in that segment, and dropped to fourth overall. Despite this, he called the event "a great stepping stone for the rest of the season." On the Grand Prix at the 2021 Skate Canada International, he placed third in the short program but again struggled in the free skate and dropped to fifth overall. He was sixth at his second event, the 2021 Internationaux de France, producing his best free skate score of the season to date. Assessing his performance, Messing said that he "had slow start to the season as it's taken me time to figure things out. After Skate Canada, we decided to work on the long program and have a better strategy. It's still not perfect, but I feel like we are on the right track now."

Journeying from Alaska to Ottawa for the 2022 Canadian Championships in the midst of restrictions prompted by the Omicron variant, Messing's skates were initially lost in transit. He initially attempted to practice with a new pair of skates but had his original skates arrive in time for the beginning of competition on Friday. He placed first in the short program despite singling his triple Axel. Messing also won the free skate despite a few jump errors, finally winning the Canadian national title. He was named to his second Canadian Olympic team and indicated that he had not yet decided whether it would be his final year of competitive skating.

Messing was originally scheduled to travel to Beijing with the bulk of the Canadian figure skating delegation. However, on February 1, it was reported that he had been unable to fly to China at that point due to the need to produce two negative PCR tests and that, as a result, his expected participation in the team event was especially in jeopardy. Messing was eventually cleared to fly to travel to China via Montreal and Milan, arriving on Monday, a day in advance of the men's event. Five hours after arriving, he attended a practice session. His travails received significant media coverage. In the short program, Messing landed all his jumps successfully but lost his balance at multiple points during the step sequence, earning a score of 93.24 points to finish ninth in the segment. He extolled the importance of "keeping the happy-go-lucky attitude. To hop on Olympic ice and to put out a performance I can be happy with, it means a lot." Tenth in the free skate, with his main error being tripling a planned quad toe loop, Messing finished eleventh overall. He said he had hoped to remain in the top ten, but that "it wasn't in the cards, but at the same time, I can still leave here happy. This is still a program I can be proud of." He announced afterward that he intended to compete for one more season, hoping to attend the next edition of the World Team Trophy.

Messing concluded his season at the 2022 World Championships, in a men's field considerably more open than usual due to the absences of Nathan Chen and Yuzuru Hanyu and the International Skating Union banning all Russian athletes due to their country's invasion of Ukraine. He was ninth in the short program but dropped to fourteenth after a rough free skate.

=== 2022–2023 season: Four Continents silver and retirement ===
Beginning the season at the 2022 CS Nebelhorn Trophy, Messing was third after the short program, where he performed poorly. A strong free skate carried him to the gold medal, and he noted afterward that it had been "a constant battle to overcome the nerves. In the short program, the nerves won. In the free skate, I was able to conquer them and put out a solid performance." He also shared the Fritz Geiger Trophy with the rest of the Canadian delegation as the top country in the competition.

Messing commenced his planned final Grand Prix at the 2022 Skate Canada International. After a quad toe loop fall in the short program, he was fourth in that segment. He was third in the free skate but narrowly remained fourth overall, 0.31 points behind the bronze medalist Matteo Rizzo. Messing said afterward that he "couldn't have asked for a better skate" in the free and that he was "not skating for a medal but for myself this year." In his final Grand Prix appearance at the 2022 Grand Prix of Espoo, he finished fourth in the short program but dropped to eighth after a twelfth-place free program.

The 2023 Canadian Championships coincided with the due date for Messing's second child, but he opted to travel with his parents to compete there. He placed first in the short program by over eight points. He was second in the free skate after a number of jump errors at the beginning of his program, but remained first overall and won his second consecutive Canadian title. He departed immediately after the medal presentations, not staying for the gala the following day. Messing called the experience "such a joyous, sad, emotional whirlwind that I could not have ended on a better note. I could hang up my skates right now and just be happy forever." He subsequently was able to return to Girdwood in time for the birth of his daughter.

Despite falling on his open quad attempt in the short program of the 2023 Four Continents Championships, Messing placed second in the segment with a season-high international score of 86.70, winning a silver small medal. He was 5.20 points back of segment leader Kao Miura of Japan, and only 0.06 ahead of third-place American Jimmy Ma. In the free skate, Messing was the penultimate skater, and produced a clean program, receiving a new personal best score in free (188.87) and overall (275.57), and a standing ovation from the crowd. He finished second overall in the segment, narrowly behind Miura, and won the silver medal. On winning his first ISU championship medal, Messing remarked that "it took me 28 years of skating to get here."

Messing scored a new personal best of 98.75 in the short program at the 2023 World Championships, coming fourth in the segment. He said it was "incredible" to finally skate the program cleanly that season at the World Championships. A singled attempt at a triple Axel and an invalid spin dropped him to seventh place overall, and eleventh in the free skate, but he called it a great event "to go out on." He then joined Team Canada for the World Team Trophy, where several jump errors in the short saw him ninth in the segment. He was seventh in the free skate, while Team Canada finished sixth overall. Despite mistakes, Messing said it was "very special" to have his last competitive skate with "all of my friends sitting in these boxes celebrating this moment with me."

On May 26, 2023, Messing officially confirmed his retirement from competition, saying that "I don't feel burdened with what I couldn't achieve but fulfilled with what I've gained and accomplished. I can step away knowing that I've truly made a difference in the sport and that I've accomplished all I set out for."

=== 2025-26 season: Canadian Nationals ===
In January 2026, Messing came out of retirement to compete at the 2026 Canadian Figure Skating Championships where he placed fifth place overall. “It really went from trying for a spot to like, no, it’s not about a spot. It’s about the experience,” he said. “It’s about coming back and doing everything I can to see what I can do. And to come back like this, with this kind of reception. And even to non-perfect skates, it’s so heartwarming. It makes me feel like I never left and it’s just, it’s so warm out there.”

== Programs ==
Season	Short program	Free skating	Exhibition
2022–2023	Grace Kelly by Mika choreo. by Lance Vipond	Lullaby for an Angel by Karl Hugo; Home by Phillip Phillips choreo. by Lance Vipond	I Just Can't Wait to Be King performed by Suburban Legends; 1,2,3,4 by Alan Doyle
2021–2022	Never Tear Us Apart by INXS, Joe Cocker choreo. by Lance Vipond	Lullaby for an Angel by Karl Hugo; Home by Phillip Phillips choreo. by Lance Vipond	1,2,3,4 by Alan Doyle
2019–2021	Perfect by Ed Sheeran choreo. by Lance Vipond	November Rain by Guns N' Roses choreo. by Lance Vipond	1,2,3,4 by Alan Doyle; Here I Am by Bryan Adams
2018–2019	You've Got a Friend in Me by Randy Newman performed by Michael Bublé choreo. by Lance Vipond	The Sober Dawn (from City Lights); The Reel Chaplin: A Symphonic Adventure, Pt. 2 by Charlie Chaplin choreo. by Lance Vipond	Trashin' the Camp (from Tarzan)
2017–2018	Singin' in the Rain by Nacio Herb Brown performed by Gene Kelly choreo. by Lance Vipond	The Sober Dawn (from City Lights); The Reel Chaplin: A Symphonic Adventure, Pt. 2 by Charlie Chaplin choreo. by Lance Vipond	Shake a Tail Feather by Otha Hayes, Verlie Rice, Andre Williams performed by The Blues Brothers feat. Ray Charles; Jailhouse Rock by Jerry Leiber and Mike Stoller performed by The Blues Brothers
2016–2017	Singin' in the Rain by Nacio Herb Brown performed by Gene Kelly choreo. by Lance Vipond	The Pink Panther Theme by Henry Mancini choreo. by Lance Vipond, Douglas Webster	
2015–2016	Always Look on the Bright Side of Life (from Monty Python's Life of Brian) by John Altman choreo. by Douglas Webster	The Pink Panther Theme by Henry Mancini choreo. by Lance Vipond, Douglas Webster	
2014–2015	Always Look on the Bright Side of Life (from Monty Python's Life of Brian) by John Altman choreo. by Douglas Webster	The Mask of Zorro by James Horner	
2013–2014	Sing, Sing, Sing by Louis Prima performed by Benny Goodman choreo. by Rory Flack	The Mask of Zorro by James Horner	
2012–2013	Sing, Sing, Sing by Louis Prima performed by Benny Goodman choreo. by Rory Flack	Clubbed to Death (from The Matrix) by Rob Dougan choreo. by Stephanie Grosscup	Trashin' the Camp (from Tarzan); Stray Cat Strut by Stray Cats; 50 Ways to Say Goodbye by Train
2011–2012	Robin Hood by Marc Streitenfeld choreo. by Rory Flack	Pirates of the Caribbean	Trashin' the Camp (from Tarzan); Rocky; Good Feeling by Flo Rida
2010–2011	Robin Hood by Marc Streitenfeld choreo. by Rory Flack	The Incredible Hulk by Craig Armstrong choreo. by Rory Flack	
2009-2010	The Soloist by Dario Marianelli	The Incredible Hulk by Craig Armstrong choreo. by Rory Flack	Thank God I'm a Country Boy by John Denver
2007–2009	Fundamentum by Lesiëm	Gremlins by Jerry Goldsmith	

== Competitive highlights ==
- GP – Event of the ISU Grand Prix Series
- JGP – Event of the ISU Junior Grand Prix Series
- CS – Event of the ISU Challenger Series
- C – Event was cancelled

=== Single skating (for Canada) ===
Competition placements at senior level
Season	2014–15	2015–16	2016–17	2017–18	2018–19	2019–20	2020–21	2021–22	2022–23	2025–26
Winter Olympics				12th				11th		
World Championships				8th	15th		6th	14th	7th	
Four Continents Championships					4th	8th			2nd	
Grand Prix Final					5th					
Canadian Championships	5th	6th	5th	2nd	3rd	3rd		1st	1st	5th
World Team Trophy					5th (6th)				6th (8th)	
GP Cup of China						4th				
GP Finland									8th	
GP Internationaux de France								6th		
GP NHK Trophy				5th						
GP Rostelecom Cup					5th					
GP Skate America						4th	3rd			
GP Skate Canada		11th		8th	2nd			5th	4th	
CS Autumn Classic			4th	3rd		3rd				
CS Finlandia Trophy								4th		
CS Golden Spin of Zagreb			3rd					1st		
CS Nebelhorn Trophy					1st				1st	
CS Ondrej Nepela Trophy		5th								
Ice Challenge										4th
Skate Canada Challenge	3rd	3rd								2nd

=== Single skating (for the United States) ===
Competition placements at senior level
Season	2009–10	2010–11	2011–12	2012–13	2013–14
U.S. Championships	9th	8th	7th	16th	12th
Cup of Nice			1st	1st	
Nebelhorn Trophy				3rd	

Competition placements at junior level
Season	2007–08	2008–09	2009–10	2010–11
World Junior Championships			4th	4th
Junior Grand Prix Final				5th
U.S. Championships	5th	2nd		
JGP Czech Republic		4th		4th
JGP Great Britain	13th	2nd		
JGP Poland			6th	
JGP Romania				1st

== Detailed results ==
ISU personal best scores in the +5/-5 GOE System
Segment	Type	Score	Event
Total	TSS	275.57	2023 Four Continents Championships
Short program	TSS	98.75	2023 World Championships
Short program	TES	53.52	2023 World Championships
Short program	PCS	45.23	2023 World Championships
Free skating	TSS	188.87	2023 Four Continents Championships
Free skating	TES	95.99	2023 Four Continents Championships
Free skating	PCS	92.88	2023 Four Continents Championships

ISU personal best scores in the +3/-3 GOE System
Segment	Type	Score	Event
Total	TSS	255.43	2018 Winter Olympics
Short program	TSS	93.00	2018 World Championships
Short program	TES	51.35	2018 World Championships
Short program	PCS	42.00	2017 CS Autumn Classic International
Free skating	TSS	170.32	2018 Winter Olympics
Free skating	TES	84.88	2018 Winter Olympics
Free skating	PCS	85.44	2018 Winter Olympics

=== Single skating (for Canada) ===
Results in the 2014–15 season
Date	Event	SP		FS		Total	
Date	Event	P	Score	P	Score	P	Score
Jan 19–25, 2015	(Canada) 2015 Canadian Championships	6	70.00	5	138.17	5	208.17

Results in the 2015–16 season
Date	Event	SP		FS		Total	
Date	Event	P	Score	P	Score	P	Score
Oct 1–3, 2015	(Slovakia) 2015 CS Ondrej Nepela Trophy	4	73.16	5	122.51	5	195.67
Oct 30 – Nov 1, 2015	2015 Skate Canada International	10	67.13	11	115.12	11	182.25
Jan 18–24, 2016	(Canada) 2016 Canadian Championships	4	77.20	6	144.30	6	221.50

Results in the 2016–17 season
Date	Event	SP		FS		Total	
Date	Event	P	Score	P	Score	P	Score
Sep 29 – Oct 1, 2016	(Canada) 2016 CS Autumn Classic International	3	75.41	4	139.69	4	215.10
Dec 7–10, 2016	(Croatia) 2016 CS Golden Spin of Zagreb	2	76.39	6	146.91	3	223.30
Jan 16–22, 2017	(Canada) 2017 Canadian Championships	8	72.09	5	158.95	5	231.04

Results in the 2017–18 season
Date	Event	SP		FS		Total	
Date	Event	P	Score	P	Score	P	Score
Sep 20–23, 2017	(Canada) 2017 CS Autumn Classic International	4	86.33	3	161.97	3	248.30
Oct 27–29, 2017	2017 Skate Canada International	5	82.17	10	135.58	8	217.75
Nov 10–12, 2017	(Japan) 2017 NHK Trophy	5	80.13	6	155.67	5	235.80
Jan 8–14, 2018	(Canada) 2018 Canadian Championships	3	90.98	3	173.60	2	259.25
Feb 14–25, 2018	(South Korea) 2018 Winter Olympics	10	85.11	12	170.32	12	255.43
Mar 19–25, 2018	(Italy) 2018 World Championships	6	93.00	11	159.30	8	252.30

Results in the 2018–19 season
Date	Event	SP		FS		Total	
Date	Event	P	Score	P	Score	P	Score
Sep 26–29, 2018	(Germany) 2018 CS Nebelhorn Trophy	1	90.63	1	166.53	1	257.16
Oct 26–28, 2018	2018 Skate Canada International	1	95.05	2	170.12	2	265.17
Nov 16–18, 2018	(Russia) 2018 Rostelecom Cup	7	73.83	6	146.92	5	220.75
Dec 6-9, 2018	(Canada) 2018–19 Grand Prix Final	6	79.56	5	156.49	5	236.05
Jan 14-20, 2019	(Canada) 2019 Canadian Championships	2	87.18	3	160.26	3	247.44
Feb 7-10, 2019	(United States) 2019 Four Continents Championships	5	88.18	3	179.43	4	267.61
Mar 18-24, 2019	(Japan) 2019 World Championships	14	82.38	15	155.26	15	237.64
Apr 11-14, 2019	(Japan) 2019 World Team Trophy	9	79.75	4	178.04	5 (6)	257.79

Results in the 2019–20 season
Date	Event	SP		FS		Total	
Date	Event	P	Score	P	Score	P	Score
Sep 12–14, 2019	(Canada) 2019 CS Autumn Classic International	3	89.57	3	166.45	3	256.02
Oct 25–27, 2019	(United States) 2019 Skate America	3	96.34	8	143.00	4	239.34
Nov 8–10, 2019	2019 Cup of China	5	76.80	3	160.56	4	237.36
Jan 13–19, 2020	(Canada) 2020 Canadian Championships	1	92.61	3	149.18	3	241.79
Feb 4–9, 2020	(South Korea) 2020 Four Continents Championships	4	94.03	8	149.90	8	243.93

Results in the 2020–21 season
Date	Event	SP		FS		Total	
Date	Event	P	Score	P	Score	P	Score
Oct 23–24, 2020	(United States) 2020 Skate America	3	92.40	3	174.02	3	266.42
Mar 22–28, 2021	(Sweden) 2021 World Championships	5	93.51	6	176.75	6	270.26

Results in the 2021–22 season
Date	Event	SP		FS		Total	
Date	Event	P	Score	P	Score	P	Score
Oct 7–10, 2021	(Finland) 2021 CS Finlandia Trophy	1	92.39	7	150.19	4	242.58
Oct 29–31, 2021	2021 Skate Canada International	3	93.28	10	145.06	5	238.34
Nov 19–21, 2021	2021 Internationaux de France	6	85.03	6	168.03	6	253.06
Dec 7–11, 2021	(Croatia) 2021 CS Golden Spin of Zagreb	1	90.26	5	164.81	1	255.07
Jan 6–12, 2022	(Canada) 2022 Canadian Championships	1	84.38	1	173.65	1	258.03
Feb 8–10, 2022	(China) 2022 Winter Olympics	9	93.24	10	172.37	11	265.61
Mar 21–27, 2022	(France) 2022 World Championships	9	91.18	17	143.85	14	235.03

Results in the 2022–23 season
Date	Event	SP		FS		Total	
Date	Event	P	Score	P	Score	P	Score
Sep 21–24, 2022	(Germany) 2022 CS Nebelhorn Trophy	3	74.85	1	170.89	1	245.74
Oct 28–30, 2022	2022 Skate Canada International	4	79.69	3	171.03	4	250.72
Nov 25–27, 2022	(Finland) 2022 Grand Prix of Espoo	4	80.12	12	124.90	8	205.02
Jan 9–15, 2023	(Canada) 2023 Canadian Championships	1	94.40	2	163.38	1	257.78
Feb 7–12, 2023	(United States) 2023 Four Continents Championships	2	86.70	2	188.87	2	275.57
Mar 22–26, 2023	(Japan) 2023 World Championships	4	98.75	11	166.41	7	265.16
Apr 13–16, 2023	(Japan) 2023 World Team Trophy	9	79.75	7	172.99	6 (8)	252.74

Results in the 2025–26 season
Date	Event	SP		FS		Total	
Date	Event	P	Score	P	Score	P	Score
Nov 5–9, 2025	(Austria) 2025 Ice Challenge	4	74.47	4	143.94	4	218.41
Nov 27-29, 2025	2025 Skate Canada Challenge	1	85.12	3	136.66	2	221.78
Jan 5-11, 2026	(Canada) 2026 Canadian Championships	7	79.05	5	148.71	5	227.76

=== Single skating (for the United States) ===
==== Senior level ====
Results in the 2009–10 season
Date	Event	SP		FS		Total	
Date	Event	P	Score	P	Score	P	Score
Jan 14–24, 2010	(United States) 2010 U.S. Championships	12	63.38	8	126.97	9	190.35

Results in the 2010–11 season
Date	Event	SP		FS		Total	
Date	Event	P	Score	P	Score	P	Score
Jan 22–30, 2011	(United States) 2011 U.S. Championships	4	69.79	8	143.50	8	213.29

Results in the 2011–12 season
Date	Event	SP		FS		Total	
Date	Event	P	Score	P	Score	P	Score
Oct 26–30, 2011	(France) 2011 International Cup of Nice	1	77.75	4	125.67	1	203.42
Jan 22–29, 2012	(United States) 2012 U.S. Championships	5	76.66	12	135.81	7	212.47

Results in the 2012–13 season
Date	Event	SP		FS		Total	
Date	Event	P	Score	P	Score	P	Score
Sep 27–29, 2012	(Germany) 2012 Nebelhorn Trophy	3	68.56	4	142.22	3	210.78
Oct 24–28, 2012	(France) 2012 International Cup of Nice	1	80.11	2	144.33	1	224.44
Jan 19–27, 2013	(United States) 2013 U.S. Championships	13	64.06	16	123.28	16	187.34

Results in the 2013–14 season
Date	Event	SP		FS		Total	
Date	Event	P	Score	P	Score	P	Score
Jan 5–12, 2014	(United States) 2014 U.S. Championships	14	61.15	11	136.30	12	197.45

==== Junior level ====
Results in the 2007–08 season
Date	Event	SP		FS		Total	
Date	Event	P	Score	P	Score	P	Score
Oct 18–21, 2007	(United Kingdom) 2007 JGP Great Britain	14	46.19	13	94.00	13	140.19
Jan 20–27, 2008	(United States) 2008 U.S. Championships (Junior)	6	57.11	5	119.52	5	176.63

Results in the 2008–09 season
Date	Event	SP		FS		Total	
Date	Event	P	Score	P	Score	P	Score
Sep 17–21, 2008	2008 JGP Czech Republic	3	57.85	5	102.51	4	160.36
Oct 15–18, 2008	(United Kingdom) 2008 JGP Great Britain	3	64.70	1	123.51	2	188.21
Jan 18–25, 2009	(United States) 2009 U.S. Championships (Junior)	2	59.80	3	117.14	2	176.94

Results in the 2009–10 season
Date	Event	SP		FS		Total	
Date	Event	P	Score	P	Score	P	Score
Sep 9–12, 2009	2009 JGP Poland	11	45.73	3	107.73	6	153.46
Mar 8–14, 2010	(Netherlands) 2010 World Junior Championships	2	68.90	4	128.13	4	197.03

Results in the 2010–11 season
Date	Event	SP		FS		Total	
Date	Event	P	Score	P	Score	P	Score
Sep 8–12, 2010	2010 JGP Romania	2	65.33	1	122.05	1	187.38
Oct 13–16, 2010	2010 JGP Czech Republic	4	61.53	4	116.37	4	177.90
Dec 9–12, 2010	(China) 2010–11 Junior Grand Prix Final	2	68.52	8	106.90	5	175.42
Feb 27 – Mar 6, 2011	(South Korea) 2011 World Junior Championships	1	72.58	7	122.49	4	195.07
