= List of highest scores in figure skating =

Figure skating records and statistics

Medal records
- Olympic Games; World Championships; European Championships; Four Continents Championships; Grand Prix of Figure Skating
- Other events: Grand Slam; Junior Grand Slam; Golden Slam; Junior Golden Slam; Super Slam

Highest scores statistics
- Current senior; Current junior; Historical senior; Historical junior

Rankings (current and statistics)
- World Standings; Season's World Ranking

The ISU Judging System (IJS) is the scoring system that has been used since 2003 to judge the figure skating disciplines of men's and women's singles, pair skating, and ice dance. It was designed and implemented by the International Skating Union (ISU), the ruling body of the sport, and is used in all international competitions sanctioned by the ISU. The ISU Judging System replaced the previous 6.0 system, and was created, in part, in response to the 2002 Winter Olympics figure skating scandal, in an attempt to make the scoring system more objective and less vulnerable to abuse.

Up to and including the 2017–2018 season, the Grade of Execution (GOE) scoring system for each program element ranged between +3 and -3. Starting with the 2018–19 season, the GOE was expanded to range between +5 and -5. Hence, the International Skating Union (ISU) have restarted all records from the 2018–19 season and all previous statistics have been marked as "historical". Accordingly, this page lists only the highest scores achieved from the 2018–19 season onwards, using the +5/-5 GOE scoring range.

These lists include records (current record holders; technical and component record scores; progression of record scores), personal bests (highest personal best (PB) scores, highest PB technical element scores; highest PB program component scores, and absolute bests (lists of absolute best scores). For the personal bests lists, only one score is listed for any one skater. The absolute bests lists may include more than one score for the same skater.

The ISU only recognizes the best scores that are set at international competitions run under the ISU's rules, and does not recognize, for example, scores that are obtained at national figure skating championships. The competitions recognized by the ISU are: Winter Olympics (including the team event), Youth Olympics (including the team event), World Championships, World Junior Championships, European Championships, Four Continents Championships, GP events, Junior GP events, Challenger Series events, and World Team Trophy.

== Incumbent highest scores and record holders ==
- TSS – Total segment score (highlighted in **bold and italic**)
- TES – Technical element score
- PCS – Program component score
- Highest total segment scores are recognized as world records by Guinness World Records.

Highest scores in men's singles by segment
Segment	Type	Skater	Nation	Score	Event
Combined Total	**TSS**	Nathan Chen	USA	**335.30**	2019–20 Grand Prix Final
Short program	**TSS**	Nathan Chen	USA	**113.97**	2022 Winter Olympics
Short program	TES	Nathan Chen	USA	65.98	2022 Winter Olympics
Short program	PCS	Yuzuru Hanyu	JPN	48.47	2019 Skate Canada International
Free skating	**TSS**	Ilia Malinin	USA	**238.24**	2025-26 Grand Prix Final
Free skating	TES	Ilia Malinin	USA	146.24	2025-26 Grand Prix Final
Free skating	PCS	Nathan Chen	USA	97.22	2022 Winter Olympics

Highest scores in women's singles by segment
Segment	Type	Skater	Nation	Score	Event
Combined Total	**TSS**	Kamila Valieva	RUS	**272.71**	2021 Rostelecom Cup
Short program	**TSS**	Kamila Valieva	RUS	**87.52**	2021 Rostelecom Cup
Short program	TES	Kamila Valieva	RUS	49.97	2021 Rostelecom Cup
Short program	PCS	Kaori Sakamoto	JPN	37.89	2026 World Figure Skating Championships
Free skating	**TSS**	Kamila Valieva	RUS	**185.29**	2021 Rostelecom Cup
Free skating	TES	Kamila Valieva	RUS	109.02	2021 Rostelecom Cup
Free skating	PCS	Kaori Sakamoto	JPN	78.10	2026 World Figure Skating Championships

Highest scores in pairs by segment
Segment	Type	Female partner	Male partner	Nation	Score	Event
Combined Total	**TSS**	Sui Wenjing	Han Cong	CHN	**239.88**	2022 Winter Olympics
Short program	**TSS**	Sui Wenjing	Han Cong	CHN	**84.41**	2022 Winter Olympics
Short program	TES	Evgenia Tarasova	Vladimir Morozov	RUS	46.04	2022 Winter Olympics
Short program	PCS	Sui Wenjing	Han Cong	CHN	38.45	2022 Winter Olympics
Free skating	**TSS**	Riku Miura	Ryuichi Kihara	JPN	**158.13**	2026 Winter Olympics
Free skating	TES	Riku Miura	Ryuichi Kihara	JPN	82.73	2026 Winter Olympics
Free skating	PCS	Evgenia Tarasova	Vladimir Morozov	RUS	76.99	2022 Winter Olympics

Highest scores in ice dance by segment
Segment	Type	Female partner	Male partner	Nation	Score	Event
Combined Total	**TSS**	Madison Chock	Evan Bates	USA	**232.32**	2023 World Team Trophy
Rhythm dance	**TSS**	Madison Chock	Evan Bates	USA	**93.91**	2023 World Team Trophy
Rhythm dance	TES	Madison Chock	Evan Bates	USA	55.16	2023 World Team Trophy
Rhythm dance	PCS	Gabriella Papadakis	Guillaume Cizeron	FRA	39.57	2022 World Championships
Free dance	**TSS**	Madison Chock	Evan Bates	USA	**138.41**	2023 World Team Trophy
Free dance	TES	Madison Chock	Evan Bates	USA	79.41	2023 World Team Trophy
Free dance	PCS	Gabriella Papadakis	Guillaume Cizeron	FRA	59.70	2022 World Championships

== Men's singles ==
=== Men's highest personal best scores ===
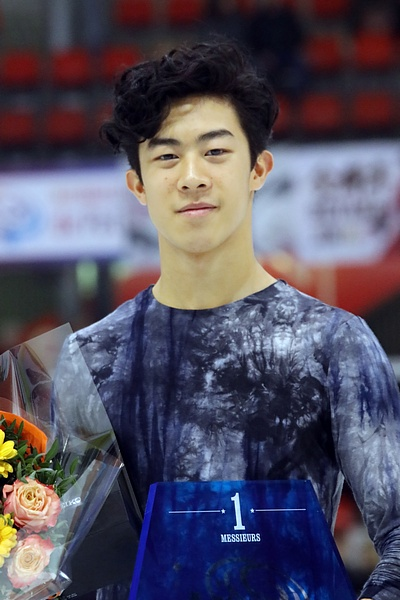
Nathan Chen is the record holder for the men's combined total and short program, and holds the second-highest free skating score.

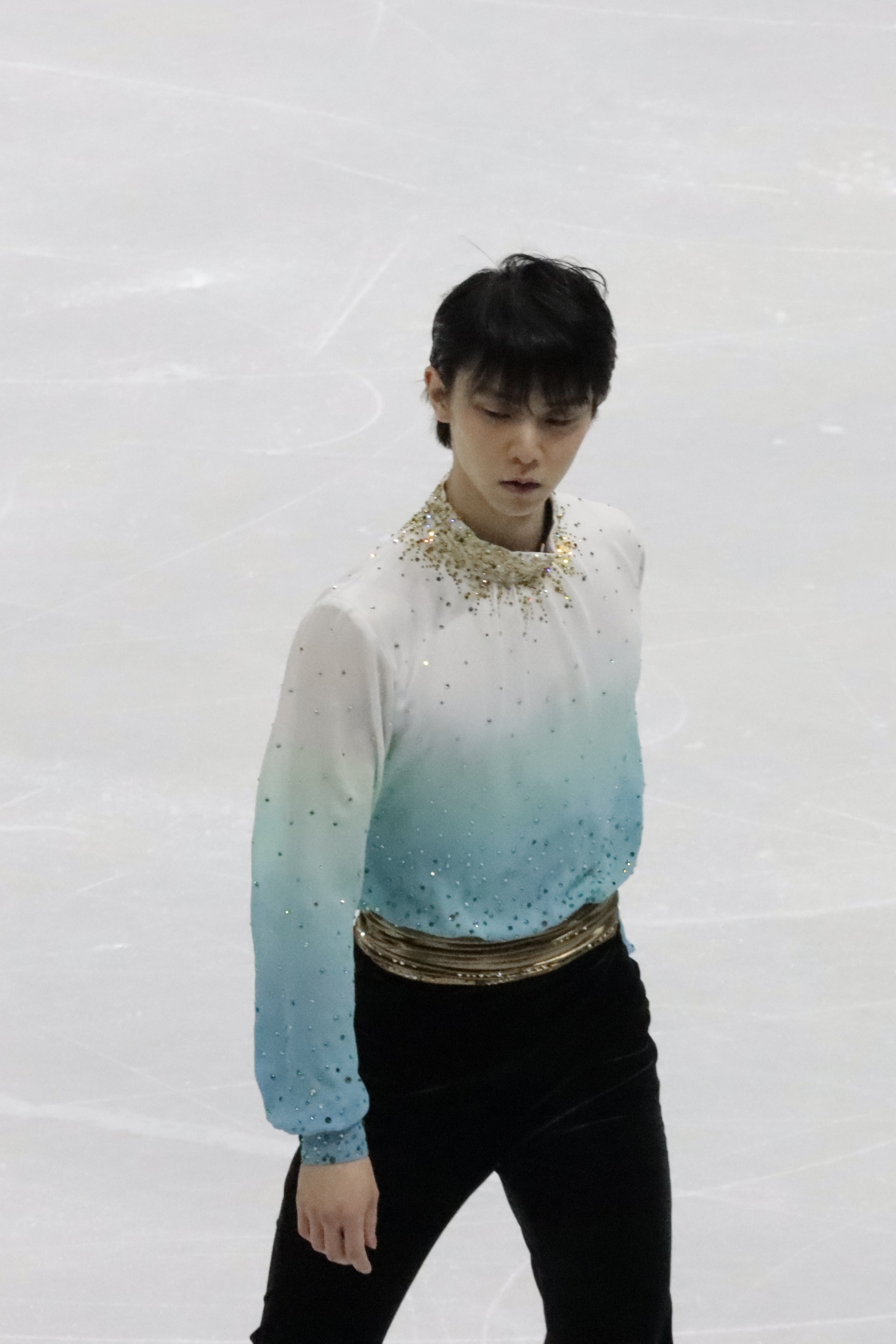
Yuzuru Hanyu currently holds the third-highest combined total, second-highest short program, and third-highest free skating scores.

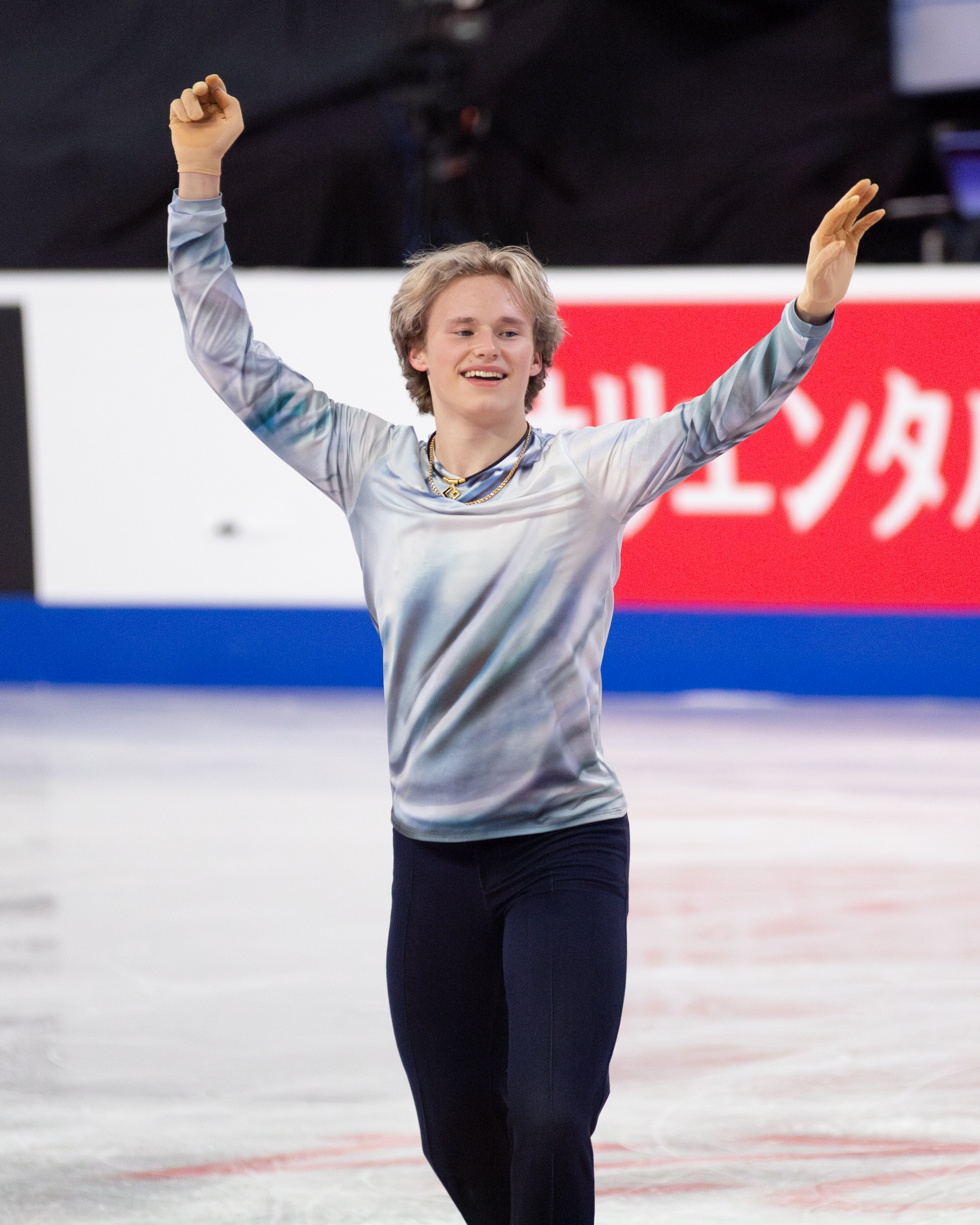
Ilia Malinin currently holds the highest free program, third highest short program score and the second-highest combined total score.

Top 10 highest personal best scores in the men's combined total
No.	Skater	Nation	Score	Event
1	Nathan Chen	United States	335.30	2019–20 Grand Prix Final
2	Ilia Malinin	United States	333.81	2025 Skate Canada International
3	Yuzuru Hanyu	Japan	322.59	2019 Skate Canada International
4	Vladislav Dikidzhi	Individual Neutral Athletes	312.79	2026 CS Denis Ten Memorial
5	Shoma Uno	Japan	312.48	2022 World Championships
6	Yuma Kagiyama	Japan	310.05	2022 Winter Olympics
7	Adam Siao Him Fa	France	306.78	2023 Grand Prix de France
8	Vincent Zhou	United States	299.01	2019 World Team Trophy
9	Cha Jun-hwan	South Korea	296.03	2023 World Championships
10	Kao Miura	Japan	293.25	2026 Cup of China

Top 10 highest personal best scores in the men's short program
No.	Skater	Nation	Score	Event
1	Nathan Chen	United States	113.97	2022 Winter Olympics
2	Yuzuru Hanyu	Japan	111.82	2020 Four Continents Championships
3	Ilia Malinin	United States	111.29	2026 World Championships
4	Shoma Uno	Japan	109.63	2022 World Championships
5	Yuma Kagiyama	Japan	108.77	2025–26 Grand Prix Final
6	Vladislav Dikidzhi	Individual Neutral Athletes	107.31	2026 CS Denis Ten Memorial
7	Kao Miura	Japan	102.96	2024 NHK Trophy
8	Adam Siao Him Fa	France	102.55	2026 Winter Olympics
9	Shun Sato	Japan	101.97	2026 Cup of China
10	Dmitri Aliev	Russia	101.49	2019 CS Nepela Memorial

Top 10 highest personal best scores in the men's free skating
No.	Skater	Nation	Score	Event
1	Ilia Malinin	United States	238.24	2025–26 Grand Prix Final
2	Nathan Chen	United States	224.92	2019–20 Grand Prix Final
3	Yuzuru Hanyu	Japan	212.99	2019 Skate Canada International
4	Yuma Kagiyama	Japan	212.87	2026 World Championships
5	Adam Siao Him Fa	France	207.17	2023 Cup of China
6	Vladislav Dikidzhi	Individual Neutral Athletes	205.48	2026 CS Denis Ten Memorial
7	Shoma Uno	Japan	204.47	2022–23 Grand Prix Final
8	Mikhail Shaidorov	Kazakhstan	198.64	2026 Winter Olympics
9	Vincent Zhou	United States	198.50	2019 World Team Trophy
10	Cha Jun-hwan	South Korea	196.39	2023 World Championships

=== Men's highest personal best TES and PCS ===
Top 10 highest personal best technical element scores in the men's short program
No.	Skater	Nation	Score	Event
1	Nathan Chen	United States	65.98	2022 Winter Olympics
2	Ilia Malinin	United States	65.05	2026 World Championships
3	Yuzuru Hanyu	Japan	63.42	2020 Four Continents Championships
4	Vladislav Dikidzhi	Individual Neutral Athletes	62.80	2026 CS Denis Ten Memorial
5	Shoma Uno	Japan	62.36	2022 World Championships
6	Yuma Kagiyama	Japan	61.54	2025–26 Grand Prix Final
7	Evgeni Semenenko	Individual Neutral Athletes	60.74	2026 CS Nepela Memorial
8	Jin Boyang	China	60.44	2019 CS Lombardia Trophy
9	Kao Miura	Japan	59.58	2026 Cup of China
10	Shun Sato	Japan	59.57	2026 Cup of China

Top 10 highest personal best technical element scores in the men's free skating
No.	Skater	Nation	Score	Event
1	Ilia Malinin	United States	146.07	2025–26 Grand Prix Final
2	Nathan Chen	United States	129.14	2019–20 Grand Prix Final
3	Adam Siao Him Fa	France	116.83	2024 World Championships
4	Yuzuru Hanyu	Japan	116.59	2019 Skate Canada International
5	Yuma Kagiyama	Japan	116.50	2022 Winter Olympics (team)
6	Vladislav Dikidzhi	Individual Neutral Athletes	114.74	2026 CS Denis Ten Memorial
7	Mikhail Shaidorov	Kazakhstan	114.68	2026 Winter Olympics
8	Shoma Uno	Japan	111.59	2022–23 Grand Prix Final
9	Daniel Grassl	Italy	110.86	2025–26 Grand Prix Final
10	Vincent Zhou	United States	110.19	2021 Skate America

Top 10 highest personal best program component scores in the men's short program
No.	Skater	Nation	Score	Event
1	Yuzuru Hanyu	Japan	48.47	2019 Skate Canada International
2	Nathan Chen	United States	47.99	2022 Winter Olympics
3	Jason Brown	United States	47.95	2023 World Team Trophy
4	Yuma Kagiyama	Japan	47.55	2026 Winter Olympics (team)
5	Shoma Uno	Japan	47.27	2022 World Championships
6	Javier Fernández	Spain	46.64	2019 European Championships
7	Cha Jun-hwan	South Korea	46.63	2023 World Team Trophy
8	Mikhail Kolyada	Russia	46.44	2019 European Championships
9	Kévin Aymoz	France	46.41	2023 World Team Trophy
10	Ilia Malinin	United States	46.36	2024-25 Grand Prix Final

Top 10 highest personal best program component scores in the men's free skating
No.	Skater	Nation	Score	Event
1	Nathan Chen	United States	97.22	2022 Winter Olympics
2	Yuma Kagiyama	Japan	96.57	2026 World Figure Skating Championships
3	Yuzuru Hanyu	Japan	96.40	2019 Skate Canada International
4	Jason Brown	United States	96.34	2022 Winter Olympics
5	Shoma Uno	Japan	95.14	2022 World Figure Skating Championships
6	Ilia Malinin	United States	95.04	2026 World Figure Skating Championships
7	Javier Fernández	Spain	94.20	2019 European Championships
8	Kévin Aymoz	France	93.24	2023 Skate America
9	Keegan Messing	Canada	92.88	2023 Four Continents Championships
10	Cha Jun-hwan	South Korea	92.28	2023 World Team Trophy

=== Men's absolute best scores ===
Top 10 absolute best scores in the men's combined total
No.	Skater	Nation	Score	Event
1	Nathan Chen	United States	335.30	2019–20 Grand Prix Final
2	Ilia Malinin	United States	333.81	2025 Skate Canada International
3	Ilia Malinin	United States	333.76	2024 World Championships
4	Nathan Chen	United States	332.60	2022 Winter Olympics
5	Ilia Malinin	United States	332.29	2025–26 Grand Prix Final
6	Ilia Malinin	United States	329.40	2026 World Championships
7	Nathan Chen	United States	323.42	2019 World Championships
8	Yuzuru Hanyu	Japan	322.59	2019 Skate Canada International
9	Ilia Malinin	United States	321.00	2025 Grand Prix de France
10	Nathan Chen	United States	320.88	2021 World Championships

Top 10 absolute best scores in the men's short program
No.	Skater	Nation	Score	Event
1	Nathan Chen	United States	113.97	2022 Winter Olympics
2	Yuzuru Hanyu	Japan	111.82	2020 Four Continents Championships
3	Nathan Chen	United States	111.71	2022 Winter Olympics (team)
4	Ilia Malinin	United States	111.29	2026 World Championships
5	Yuzuru Hanyu	Japan	110.53	2018 Rostelecom Cup
6	Ilia Malinin	United States	110.41	2025 World Championships
7	Nathan Chen	United States	110.38	2019–20 Grand Prix Final
8	Nathan Chen	United States	109.65	2021 World Team Trophy
9	Shoma Uno	Japan	109.63	2022 World Championships
10	Yuzuru Hanyu	Japan	109.60	2019 Skate Canada International

Top 10 absolute best scores in the men's free skating
No.	Skater	Nation	Score	Event
1	Ilia Malinin	United States	238.24	2025–26 Grand Prix Final
2	Ilia Malinin	United States	228.97	2025 Skate Canada International
3	Ilia Malinin	United States	227.79	2024 World Championships
4	Nathan Chen	United States	224.92	2019–20 Grand Prix Final
5	Nathan Chen	United States	222.03	2021 World Championships
6	Nathan Chen	United States	218.63	2022 Winter Olympics
7	Ilia Malinin	United States	218.11	2026 World Championships
8	Nathan Chen	United States	216.02	2019 World Championships
9	Ilia Malinin	United States	215.78	2025 Grand Prix de France
10	Yuzuru Hanyu	Japan	212.99	2019 Skate Canada International

=== Progression of men's highest scores ===
Progression of highest scores in the men's combined total
Date	Skater	Nation	Score	Event
Aug 5, 2018	Sōta Yamamoto	Japan	198.92	2018 CS Asian Open Trophy
Aug 24, 2018	Stephen Gogolev	Canada	226.63	2018 JGP Slovakia
Sep 15, 2018	Matteo Rizzo	Italy	227.97	2018 CS Lombardia Trophy
Sep 15, 2018	Dmitri Aliev	Russia	250.55	2018 CS Lombardia Trophy
Sep 15, 2018	Shoma Uno	Japan	276.20	2018 CS Lombardia Trophy
Oct 20, 2018	Nathan Chen	United States	280.57	2018 Skate America
Nov 4, 2018	Yuzuru Hanyu	Japan	297.12	2018 Grand Prix of Helsinki
Mar 23, 2019	Yuzuru Hanyu	Japan	300.97	2019 World Championships
Mar 23, 2019	Nathan Chen	United States	323.42	2019 World Championships
Dec 7, 2019	Nathan Chen	United States	335.30	2019–20 Grand Prix Final

Progression of highest scores in the men's short program
Date	Skater	Nation	Score	Event
Aug 4, 2018	Tsao Chih-i	Chinese Taipei	65.57	2018 CS Asian Open Trophy
Aug 23, 2018	Roman Savosin	Russia	67.10	2018 JGP Slovakia
Aug 23, 2018	Mitsuki Sumoto	Japan	74.13	2018 JGP Slovakia
Aug 23, 2018	Stephen Gogolev	Canada	77.67	2018 JGP Slovakia
Aug 30, 2018	Conrad Orzel	Canada	79.66	2018 JGP Austria
Sep 13, 2018	Matteo Rizzo	Italy	85.51	2018 CS Lombardia Trophy
Sep 13, 2018	Dmitri Aliev	Russia	86.57	2018 CS Lombardia Trophy
Sep 13, 2018	Shoma Uno	Japan	104.15	2018 CS Lombardia Trophy
Nov 3, 2018	Yuzuru Hanyu	Japan	106.69	2018 Grand Prix of Helsinki
Nov 16, 2018	Yuzuru Hanyu	Japan	110.53	2018 Rostelecom Cup
Feb 7, 2020	Yuzuru Hanyu	Japan	111.82	2020 Four Continents Championships
Feb 8, 2022	Nathan Chen	United States	113.97	2022 Winter Olympics

Progression of highest scores in the men's free skating
Date	Skater	Nation	Score	Event
Aug 5, 2018	Sōta Yamamoto	Japan	141.00	2018 CS Asian Open Trophy
Aug 24, 2018	Stephen Gogolev	Canada	148.96	2018 JGP Slovakia
Sep 15, 2018	Dmitri Aliev	Russia	163.98	2018 CS Lombardia Trophy
Sep 15, 2018	Shoma Uno	Japan	172.05	2018 CS Lombardia Trophy
Sep 22, 2018	Mikhail Kolyada	Russia	177.55	2018 CS Ondrej Nepela Trophy
Oct 20, 2018	Nathan Chen	United States	189.99	2018 Skate America
Nov 4, 2018	Yuzuru Hanyu	Japan	190.43	2018 Grand Prix of Helsinki
Feb 9, 2019	Shoma Uno	Japan	197.36	2019 Four Continents Championships
Mar 23, 2019	Yuzuru Hanyu	Japan	206.10	2019 World Championships
Mar 23, 2019	Nathan Chen	United States	216.02	2019 World Championships
Dec 7, 2019	Nathan Chen	United States	224.92	2019–20 Grand Prix Final
Mar 24, 2024	Ilia Malinin	United States	227.79	2024 World Championships
Nov 2, 2025	Ilia Malinin	United States	228.97	2025 Skate Canada International
Dec 6, 2025	Ilia Malinin	United States	238.24	2025–26 Grand Prix Final

== Women's singles ==
=== Women's highest personal best scores ===
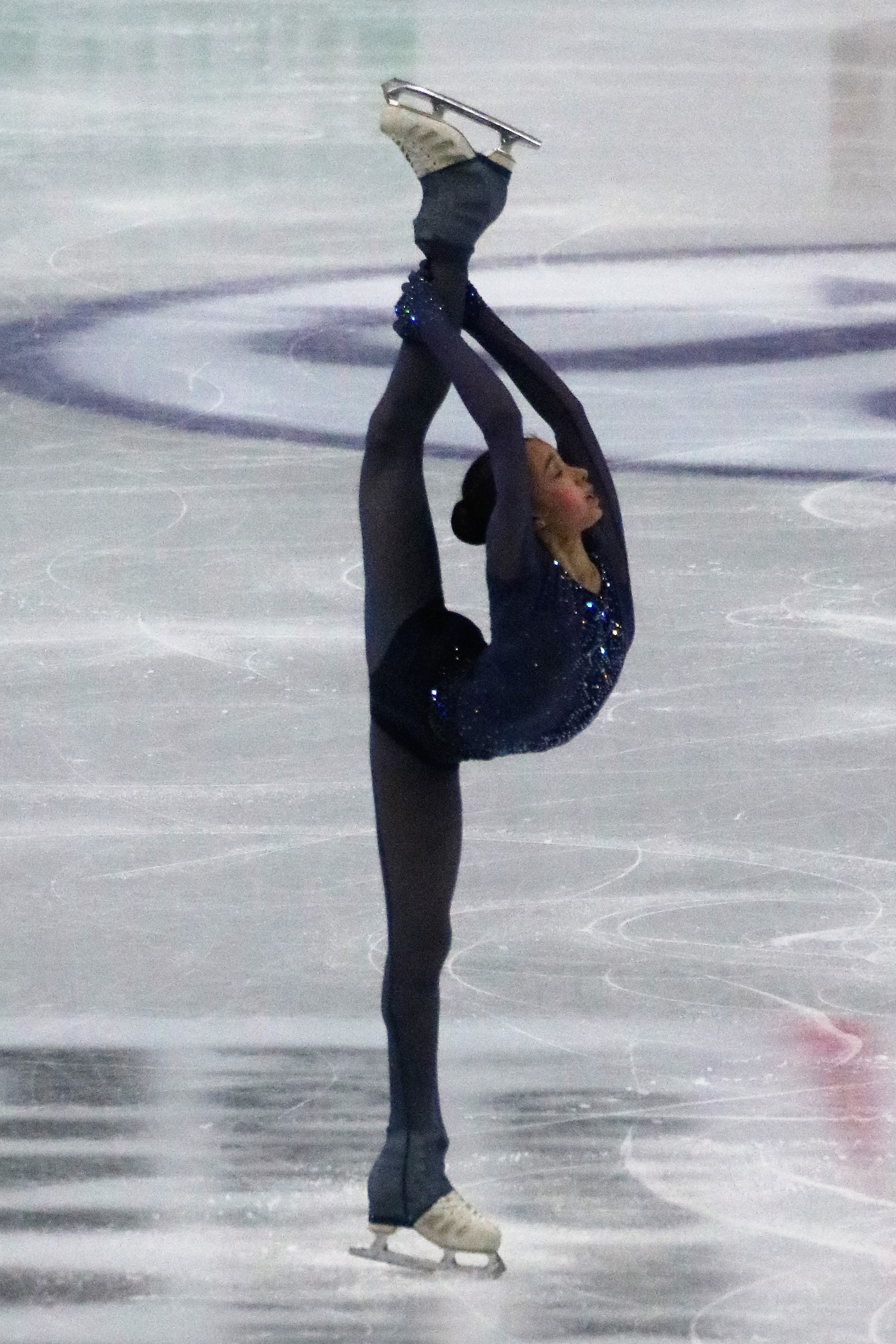
Kamila Valieva is the record holder for the women's scores.

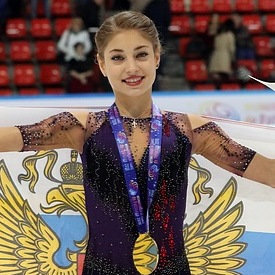
Alena Kostornaia currently holds the second highest women's short program score.

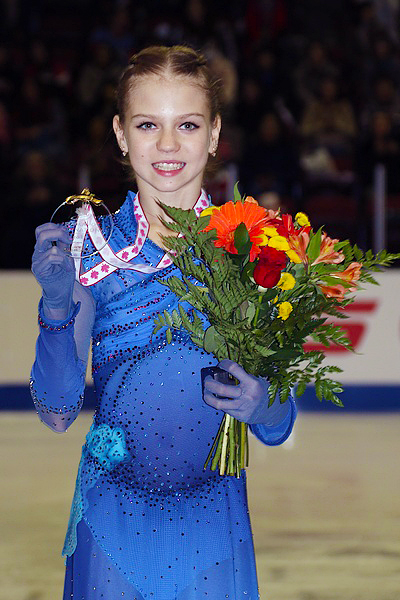
Alexandra Trusova currently holds the second highest women's free skating score.

Top 10 highest personal best scores in the women's combined total
No.	Skater	Nation	Score	Event
1	Kamila Valieva	Russia	272.71	2021 Rostelecom Cup
2	Anna Shcherbakova	Russia	255.95	2022 Winter Olympics
3	Alexandra Trusova	Russia	251.73	2022 Winter Olympics
4	Alena Kostornaia	Russia	247.59	2019–20 Grand Prix Final
5	Alina Zagitova	Russia	238.43	2018 CS Nebelhorn Trophy
6	Kaori Sakamoto	Japan	238.28	2026 World Championships
7	Ami Nakai	Japan	236.81	2026 Skate America
8	Mao Shimada	Japan	235.44	2026 Skate Canada International
9	Elizaveta Tuktamysheva	Russia	234.43	2019 World Team Trophy
10	Rika Kihira	Japan	233.12	2018–19 Grand Prix Final

Top 10 highest personal best scores in the women's short program
No.	Skater	Nation	Score	Event
1	Kamila Valieva	Russia	87.42	2021 Rostelecom Cup
2	Alena Kostornaia	Russia	85.45	2019–20 Grand Prix Final
3	Rika Kihira	Japan	83.97	2019 World Team Trophy
4	Ami Nakai	Japan	82.20	2026 Skate America
5	Mao Shimada	Japan	82.11	2026 Skate Canada International
6	Alina Zagitova	Russia	82.08	2019 World Championships
7	Elizaveta Tuktamysheva	Russia	81.53	2021 CS Finlandia Trophy
8	Anna Shcherbakova	Russia	81.07	2021 World Team Trophy
9	Kaori Sakamoto	Japan	80.32	2022 World Championships
10	Wakaba Higuchi	Japan	79.73	2021 CS Cup of Austria

Top 10 highest personal best scores in the women's free skating
No.	Skater	Nation	Score	Event
1	Kamila Valieva	Russia	185.29	2021 Rostelecom Cup
2	Alexandra Trusova	Russia	177.13	2022 Winter Olympics
3	Anna Shcherbakova	Russia	175.75	2022 Winter Olympics
4	Alena Kostornaia	Russia	162.14	2019–20 Grand Prix Final
5	Kaori Sakamoto	Japan	158.97	2026 World Championships
6	Alina Zagitova	Russia	158.50	2018 CS Nebelhorn Trophy,
7	Sofia Akateva	Russia	157.19	2021 JGP Russia
8	Mao Shimada	Japan	156.16	2025 World Junior Championships
9	Maya Khromykh	Russia	154.97	2021 Rostelecom Cup
10	Rika Kihira	Japan	154.72	2018 NHK Trophy

=== Women's highest personal best TES and PCS ===
Top 10 highest personal best technical element scores in the women's short program
No.	Skater	Nation	Score	Event
1	Kamila Valieva	Russia	49.97	2021 Rostelecom Cup
2	Alena Kostornaia	Russia	49.48	2019–20 Grand Prix Final
3	Mao Shimada	Japan	49.23	2026 Skate Canada International
4	Ami Nakai	Japan	48.25	2026 Skate America
5	Rika Kihira	Japan	48.17	2019 World Team Trophy
6	Wakaba Higuchi	Japan	46.25	2021 CS Cup of Austria
7	Elizaveta Tuktamysheva	Russia	45.89	2021 CS Finlandia Trophy
8	You Young	South Korea	45.54	2019 Skate Canada International
9	Alina Zagitova	Russia	44.72	2019 World Championships
10	Sofia Akateva	Russia	44.60	2021 JGP Russia

Top 10 highest personal best technical element scores in the women's free skating
No.	Skater	Nation	Score	Event
1	Kamila Valieva	Russia	109.02	2021 Rostelecom Cup
2	Alexandra Trusova	Russia	106.16	2022 Winter Olympics
3	Anna Shcherbakova	Russia	100.49	2022 Winter Olympics
4	Sofia Akateva	Russia	94.57	2021 JGP Russia
5	Mao Shimada	Japan	89.23	2025 World Junior Championships
6	Alena Kostornaia	Russia	88.87	2019–20 Grand Prix Final
7	Rika Kihira	Japan	87.17	2018 NHK Trophy
8	Maya Khromykh	Russia	85.77	2021 Gran Premio d'Italia
9	Alysa Liu	United States	83.94	2019 JGP Poland
10	Alina Zagitova	Russia	83.54	2018 CS Nebelhorn Trophy

Top 10 highest personal best program component scores in the women's short program
No.	Skater	Nation	Score	Event
1	Kaori Sakamoto	Japan	37.89	2026 World Championships
2	Anna Shcherbakova	Russia	37.56	2021 World Team Trophy
3	Kamila Valieva	Russia	37.45	2021 Rostelecom Cup
4	Alina Zagitova	Russia	37.36	2019 World Championships
5	Evgenia Medvedeva	Russia	36.66	2019 Rostelecom Cup
6	Alena Kostornaia	Russia	36.02	2020 European Championships
7	Mone Chiba	Japan	36.02	2026 World Championships
8	Loena Hendrickx	Belgium	36.00	2023 Skate America
9	Lee Hae-in	South Korea	35.90	2023 World Team Trophy
10	Rika Kihira	Japan	35.80	2019 World Team Trophy

Top 10 highest personal best program component scores in the women's free skating
No.	Skater	Nation	Score	Event
1	Kaori Sakamoto	Japan	78.10	2026 World Championships
2	Kamila Valieva	Russia	76.27	2021 Rostelecom Cup
3	Anna Shcherbakova	Russia	75.26	2022 Winter Olympics
4	Alina Zagitova	Russia	74.96	2018 CS Nebelhorn Trophy
5	Evgenia Medvedeva	Russia	74.06	2019 Rostelecom Cup
6	Alena Kostornaia	Russia	73.27	2019–20 Grand Prix Final
7	Elizaveta Tuktamysheva	Russia	73.22	2021 CS Finlandia Trophy
8	Loena Hendrickx	Belgium	72.94	2023 Skate America
9	Rika Kihira	Japan	72.52	2019 NHK Trophy
10	Lee Hae-in	South Korea	72.46	2023 World Team Trophy

=== Women's absolute best scores ===
Top 10 absolute best scores in the women's combined total
No.	Skater	Nation	Score	Event
1	Kamila Valieva	Russia	272.71	2021 Rostelecom Cup
2	Kamila Valieva	Russia	265.08	2021 Skate Canada International
3	Anna Shcherbakova	Russia	255.95	2022 Winter Olympics
4	Alexandra Trusova	Russia	251.73	2022 Winter Olympics
5	Kamila Valieva	Russia	249.24	2021 CS Finlandia Trophy
6	Alena Kostornaia	Russia	247.59	2019–20 Grand Prix Final
7	Anna Shcherbakova	Russia	241.65	2021 World Team Trophy
8	Alexandra Trusova	Russia	241.02	2019 Skate Canada International
9	Anna Shcherbakova	Russia	240.92	2019–20 Grand Prix Final
10	Alexandra Trusova	Russia	238.69	2019 CS Nepela Memorial

Top 10 absolute best scores in the women's short program
No.	Skater	Nation	Score	Event
1	Kamila Valieva	Russia	87.42	2021 Rostelecom Cup
2	Alena Kostornaia	Russia	85.45	2019–20 Grand Prix Final
3	Alena Kostornaia	Russia	85.04	2019 NHK Trophy
4	Alena Kostornaia	Russia	84.92	2020 European Championships
5	Kamila Valieva	Russia	84.19	2021 Skate Canada International
6	Rika Kihira	Japan	83.97	2019 World Team Trophy
7	Rika Kihira	Japan	82.51	2018–19 Grand Prix Final
8	Ami Nakai	Japan	82.20	2026 Skate America
9	Mao Shimada	Japan	82.11	2026 Skate Canada International
10	Alina Zagitova	Russia	82.08	2019 World Championships

Top 10 absolute best scores in the women's free skating
No.	Skater	Nation	Score	Event
1	Kamila Valieva	Russia	185.29	2021 Rostelecom Cup
2	Kamila Valieva	Russia	180.89	2021 Skate Canada International
3	Alexandra Trusova	Russia	177.13	2022 Winter Olympics
4	Anna Shcherbakova	Russia	175.75	2022 Winter Olympics
5	Kamila Valieva	Russia	174.31	2021 CS Finlandia Trophy
6	Anna Shcherbakova	Russia	168.37	2022 European Championships
7	Alexandra Trusova	Russia	166.62	2019 Skate Canada International
8	Anna Shcherbakova	Russia	165.05	2021 Gran Premio d'Italia
9	Alexandra Trusova	Russia	163.78	2019 CS Nepela Memorial
10	Anna Shcherbakova	Russia	162.65	2019-20 Grand Prix Final

=== Progression of women's highest scores ===
Progression of highest scores in the women's combined total
Date	Skater	Nation	Score	Event
Aug 5, 2018	Lim Eun-soo	South Korea	184.33	2018 CS Asian Open Trophy
Aug 25, 2018	Anna Shcherbakova	Russia	205.39	2018 JGP Slovakia
Sep 7, 2018	Alexandra Trusova	Russia	221.44	2018 JGP Lithuania
Sep 28, 2018	Alina Zagitova	Russia	238.43	2018 CS Nebelhorn Trophy
Sep 21, 2019	Alexandra Trusova	Russia	238.69	2019 CS Nepela Memorial
Oct 26, 2019	Alexandra Trusova	Russia	241.02	2019 Skate Canada International
Dec 7, 2019	Alena Kostornaia	Russia	247.59	2019–20 Grand Prix Final
Oct 10, 2021	Kamila Valieva	Russia	249.24	2021 CS Finlandia Trophy
Oct 30, 2021	Kamila Valieva	Russia	265.08	2021 Skate Canada International
Nov 27, 2021	Kamila Valieva	Russia	272.71	2021 Rostelecom Cup

Progression of highest scores in the women's short program
Date	Skater	Nation	Score	Event
Aug 4, 2018	Lim Eun-soo	South Korea	68.09	2018 CS Asian Open Trophy
Aug 23, 2018	Anna Shcherbakova	Russia	73.18	2018 JGP Slovakia
Sep 6, 2018	Alexandra Trusova	Russia	74.74	2018 JGP Lithuania
Sep 27, 2018	Alina Zagitova	Russia	79.93	2018 CS Nebelhorn Trophy
Nov 16, 2018	Alina Zagitova	Russia	80.78	2018 Rostelecom Cup
Dec 6, 2018	Rika Kihira	Japan	82.51	2018–19 Grand Prix Final
Apr 11, 2019	Rika Kihira	Japan	83.97	2019 World Team Trophy
Nov 22, 2019	Alena Kostornaia	Russia	85.04	2019 NHK Trophy
Dec 6, 2019	Alena Kostornaia	Russia	85.45	2019–20 Grand Prix Final
Nov 26, 2021	Kamila Valieva	Russia	87.42	2021 Rostelecom Cup

Progression of highest scores in the women's free skating
Date	Skater	Nation	Score	Event
Aug 5, 2018	Yuna Shiraiwa	Japan	118.54	2018 CS Asian Open Trophy
Aug 25, 2018	Yuhana Yokoi	Japan	121.50	2018 JGP Slovakia
Aug 25, 2018	Anna Shcherbakova	Russia	132.21	2018 JGP Slovakia
Sep 1, 2018	Alena Kostornaia	Russia	132.42	2018 JGP Austria
Sep 7, 2018	Alexandra Trusova	Russia	146.70	2018 JGP Lithuania
Sep 22, 2018	Rika Kihira	Japan	147.37	2018 CS Ondrej Nepela Trophy
Sep 28, 2018	Alina Zagitova	Russia	158.50	2018 CS Nebelhorn Trophy
Sep 21, 2019	Alexandra Trusova	Russia	163.78	2019 CS Nepela Memorial
Oct 26, 2019	Alexandra Trusova	Russia	166.62	2019 Skate Canada International
Oct 10, 2021	Kamila Valieva	Russia	174.31	2021 CS Finlandia Trophy
Oct 30, 2021	Kamila Valieva	Russia	180.89	2021 Skate Canada International
Nov 27, 2021	Kamila Valieva	Russia	185.29	2021 Rostelecom Cup

== Pairs ==
=== Pairs' highest personal best scores ===
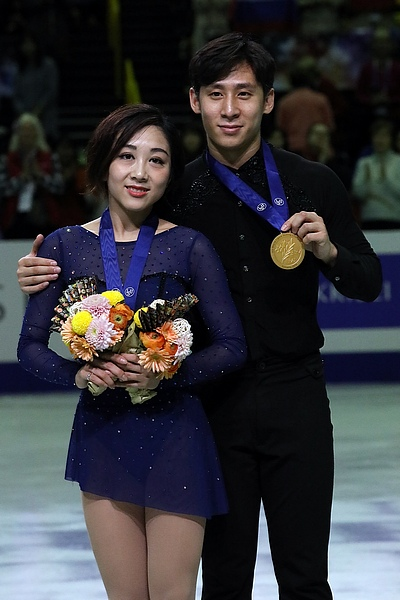
Sui Wenjing and Han Cong are the pairs total score and short program record holders.

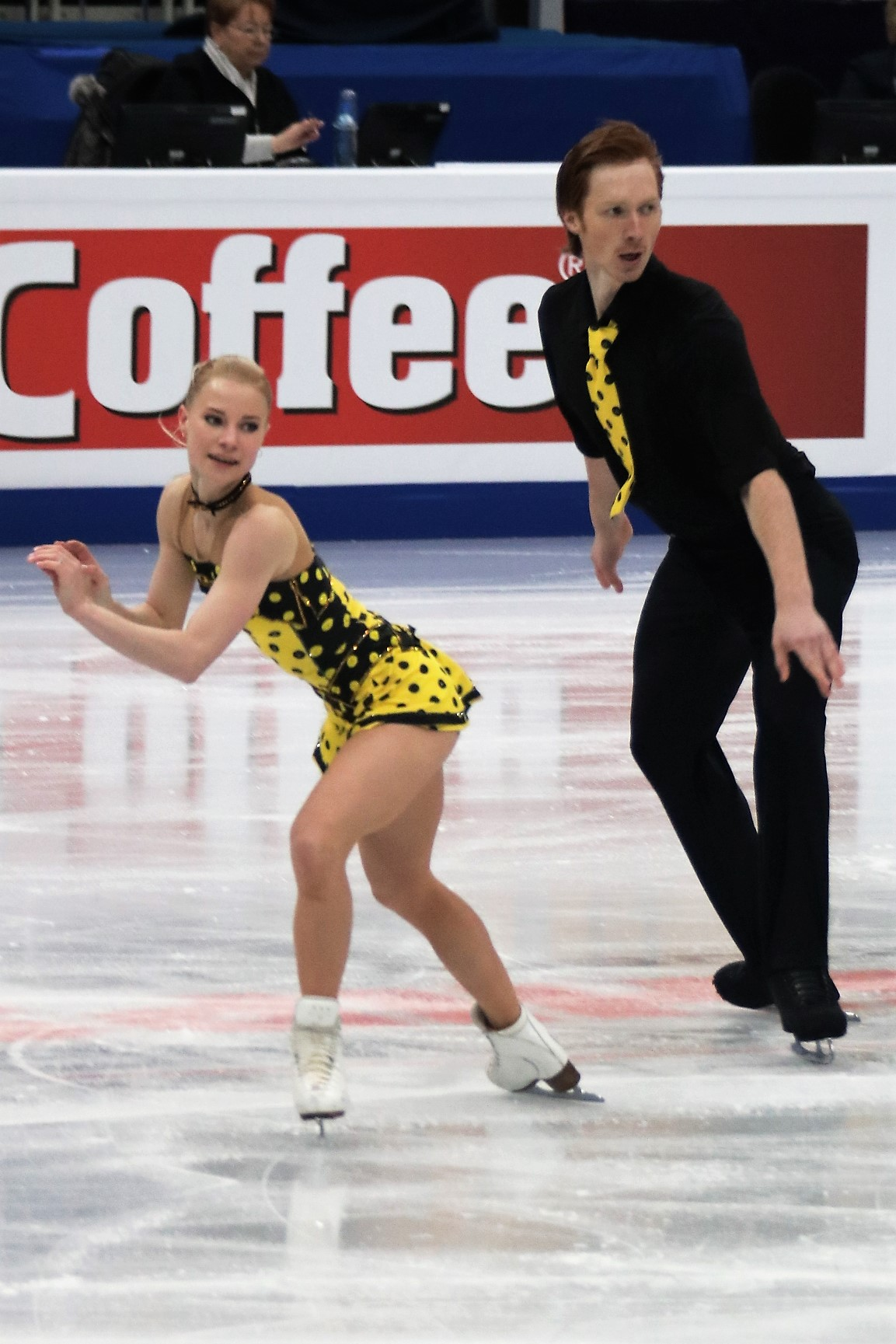
Evgenia Tarasova and Vladimir Morozov currently hold the second highest score for the pairs short program.

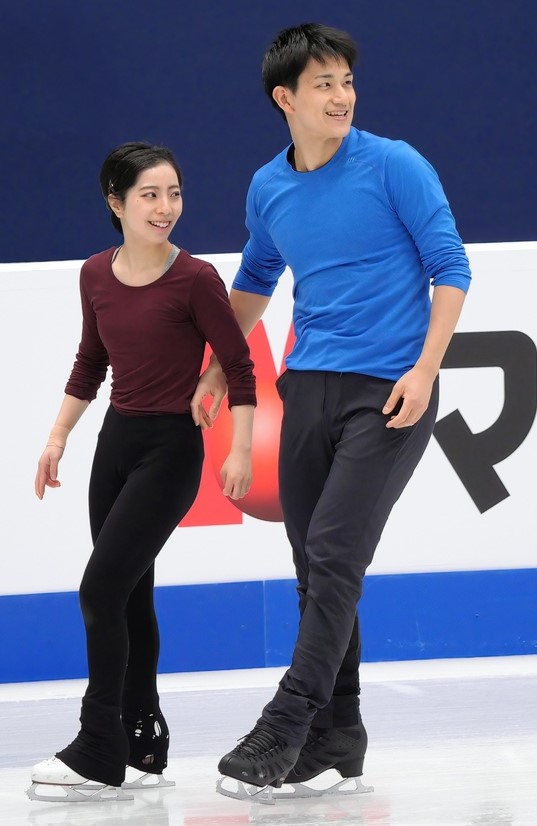
Riku Miura and Ryuichi Kihara are the record holders for the pairs' free skating scores.

Top 10 highest personal best scores in the pairs' combined total
Pl.	Team	Nation	Score	Event
1	Sui Wenjing; Han Cong	China	239.88	2022 Winter Olympics
2	Anastasia Mishina; Aleksandr Galliamov	Russia	239.82	2022 European Championships
3	Evgenia Tarasova; Vladimir Morozov	Russia	239.25	2022 Winter Olympics
4	Aleksandra Boikova; Dmitrii Kozlovskii	Russia	234.58	2020 European Championships
5	Riku Miura; Ryuichi Kihara	Japan	231.24	2026 Winter Olympics
6	Alexa Knierim; Brandon Frazier	United States	230.12	2023 World Team Trophy
7	Vanessa James; Morgan Ciprès	France	226.00	2019 World Team Trophy
8	Anastasia Metelkina; Luka Berulava	Georgia	225.20	2025 CS Trialeti Trophy
9	Sara Conti; Niccolò Macii	Italy	223.28	2025–26 Grand Prix Final
10	Deanna Stellato-Dudek; Maxime Deschamps	Canada	221.56	2024 World Championships

Top 10 highest personal best scores in the pairs' short program
No.	Team	Nation	Score	Event
1	Sui Wenjing; Han Cong	China	84.41	2022 Winter Olympics
2	Evgenia Tarasova; Vladimir Morozov	Russia	84.25	2022 Winter Olympics
3	Riku Miura; Ryuichi Kihara	Japan	82.84	2026 Winter Olympics (team)
4	Anastasia Mishina; Aleksandr Galliamov	Russia	82.76	2022 Winter Olympics
5	Aleksandra Boikova; Dmitrii Kozlovskii	Russia	82.34	2020 European Championships
6	Alexa Knierim; Brandon Frazier	United States	82.25	2023 World Team Trophy
7	Minerva Fabienne Hase; Nikita Volodin	Germany	80.01	2026 Winter Olympics
7	Anastasia Metelkina; Luka Berulava	Georgia	80.01	2026 CS Trialeti Trophy
9	Deanna Stellato-Dudek; Maxime Deschamps	Canada	77.48	2024 World Championships
10	Sara Conti; Niccolò Macii	Italy	77.22	2025–26 Grand Prix Final

Top 10 highest personal best scores in the pairs' free skating
No.	Team	Nation	Score	Event
1	Riku Miura; Ryuichi Kihara	Japan	158.13	2026 Winter Olympics
2	Anastasia Mishina; Aleksandr Galliamov	Russia	157.46	2022 European Championships
3	Sui Wenjing; Han Cong	China	155.60	2019 World Championships
4	Evgenia Tarasova; Vladimir Morozov	Russia	155.00	2022 Winter Olympics
5	Vanessa James; Morgan Ciprès	France	152.52	2019 World Team Trophy
6	Aleksandra Boikova; Dmitrii Kozlovskii	Russia	152.24	2020 European Championships
7	Minerva Fabienne Hase; Nikita Volodin	Germany	149.57	2025–26 Grand Prix Final
8	Anastasia Metelkina; Luka Berulava	Georgia	148.07	2025 CS Trialeti Trophy
9	Alexa Knierim; Brandon Frazier	United States	147.87	2023 World Team Trophy
10	Sara Conti; Niccolò Macii	Italy	146.06	2025–26 Grand Prix Final

=== Pairs' highest personal best TES and PCS ===
Top 10 highest personal best technical element scores in the pairs' short program
Pl.	Team	Nation	Score	Event
1	Evgenia Tarasova; Vladimir Morozov	Russia	46.04	2022 Winter Olympics
2	Sui Wenjing; Han Cong	China	45.96	2022 Winter Olympics
3	Aleksandra Boikova; Dmitrii Kozlovskii	Russia	45.93	2020 European Championships
4	Riku Miura; Ryuichi Kihara	Japan	45.60	2026 Winter Olympics (team)
5	Alexa Knierim; Brandon Frazier	United States	45.38	2023 World Team Trophy
6	Anastasia Mishina; Aleksandr Galliamov	Russia	45.22	2022 Winter Olympics (team)
7	Anastasia Metelkina; Luka Berulava	Georgia	44.44	2025 Skate America
8	Minerva Fabienne Hase; Nikita Volodin	Germany	43.91	2026 Winter Olympics
9	Apollinariia Panfilova; Dmitry Rylov	Russia	43.02	2020 World Junior Championships
10	Daria Pavliuchenko; Denis Khodykin	Russia	42.50	2019–20 Grand Prix Final

Top 10 highest personal best technical element scores in the pairs' free skating
Pl.	Team	Nation	Score	Event
1	Riku Miura; Ryuichi Kihara	Japan	82.73	2026 Winter Olympics
2	Anastasia Mishina; Aleksandr Galliamov	Russia	81.45	2022 European Championships
3	Minerva Fabienne Hase; Nikita Volodin	Germany	78.81	2025–26 Grand Prix Final
4	Sui Wenjing; Han Cong	China	78.76	2019 World Championships
5	Evgenia Tarasova; Vladimir Morozov	Russia	78.74	2022 European Championships
6	Aleksandra Boikova; Dmitrii Kozlovskii	Russia	78.16	2020 European Championships
7	Anastasia Metelkina; Luka Berulava	Georgia	77.98	2025 CS Trialeti Trophy
8	Vanessa James; Morgan Ciprès	France	76.39	2019 World Team Trophy
9	Sara Conti; Niccolò Macii	Italy	75.86	2025–26 Grand Prix Final
10	Natalia Zabiiako; Alexander Enbert	Russia	74.87	2019 World Championships

Top 10 highest personal best program component scores in the pairs' short program
Pl.	Team	Nation	Score	Event
1	Sui Wenjing; Han Cong	China	38.45	2022 Winter Olympics
2	Evgenia Tarasova; Vladimir Morozov	Russia	38.21	2022 Winter Olympics
3	Anastasia Mishina; Aleksandr Galliamov	Russia	38.06	2022 European Championships
4	Riku Miura; Ryuichi Kihara	Japan	37.24	2026 Winter Olympics (team)
5	Aleksandra Boikova; Dmitrii Kozlovskii	Russia	37.21	2020 European Championships
6	Alexa Knierim; Brandon Frazier	United States	36.87	2023 World Team Trophy
7	Anastasia Metelkina; Luka Berulava	Georgia	36.50	2026 CS Trialeti Trophy
8	Minerva Fabienne Hase; Nikita Volodin	Germany	36.28	2026 World Championships
9	Vanessa James; Morgan Ciprès	France	35.86	2019 European Championships
10	Deanna Stellato-Dudek; Maxime Deschamps	Canada	35.43	2024 World Championships

Top 10 highest personal best program component scores in the pairs' free skating
Pl.	Team	Nation	Score	Event
1	Evgenia Tarasova; Vladimir Morozov	Russia	76.99	2022 Winter Olympics
2	Sui Wenjing; Han Cong	China	76.86	2022 Winter Olympics
3	Vanessa James; Morgan Ciprès	France	76.13	2019 World Team Trophy
4	Anastasia Mishina; Aleksandr Galliamov	Russia	76.01	2022 European Championships
5	Riku Miura; Ryuichi Kihara	Japan	75.40	2026 Winter Olympics
6	Alexa Knierim; Brandon Frazier	United States	74.16	2023 World Team Trophy
7	Aleksandra Boikova; Dmitrii Kozlovskii	Russia	74.08	2020 European Championships
8	Minerva Fabienne Hase; Nikita Volodin	Germany	73.02	2026 World Championships
9	Anastasia Metelkina; Luka Berulava	Georgia	72.35	2026 CS Trialeti Trophy
10	Deanna Stellato-Dudek; Maxime Deschamps	Canada	71.13	2024 World Championships

=== Pairs' absolute best scores ===
Top 10 absolute best scores in the pairs' combined total
No.	Female partner	Male partner	Nation	Score	Event
1	Sui Wenjing	Han Cong	China	239.88	2022 Winter Olympics
2	Anastasia Mishina	Aleksandr Galliamov	Russia	239.82	2022 European Championships
3	Evgenia Tarasova	Vladimir Morozov	Russia	239.25	2022 Winter Olympics
4	Anastasia Mishina	Aleksandr Galliamov	Russia	237.71	2022 Winter Olympics
5	Evgenia Tarasova	Vladimir Morozov	Russia	236.43	2022 European Championships
6	Sui Wenjing	Han Cong	China	234.84	2019 World Championships
7	Aleksandra Boikova	Dmitrii Kozlovskii	Russia	234.58	2020 European Championships
8	Riku Miura	Ryuichi Kihara	Japan	231.24	2026 Winter Olympics
9	Alexa Knierim	Brandon Frazier	United States	230.12	2023 World Team Trophy
10	Aleksandra Boikova	Dmitrii Kozlovskii	Russia	229.48	2019 Rostelecom Cup

Top 10 absolute best scores in the pairs' short program
No.	Team	Nation	Score	Event
1	Sui Wenjing; Han Cong	China	84.41	2022 Winter Olympics
2	Evgenia Tarasova; Vladimir Morozov	Russia	84.25	2022 Winter Olympics
3	Riku Miura; Ryuichi Kihara	Japan	82.84	2026 Winter Olympics (team)
4	Sui Wenjing; Han Cong	China	82.83	2022 Winter Olympics (team)
5	Anastasia Mishina; Aleksandr Galliamov	Russia	82.76	2022 Winter Olympics
6	Anastasia Mishina; Aleksandr Galliamov	Russia	82.64	2022 Winter Olympics (team)
7	Anastasia Mishina; Aleksandr Galliamov	Russia	82.36	2022 European Championships
8	Aleksandra Boikova; Dmitrii Kozlovskii	Russia	82.34	2020 European Championships
9	Alexa Knierim; Brandon Frazier	United States	82.25	2023 World Team Trophy
10	Evgenia Tarasova; Vladimir Morozov	Russia	81.58	2022 European Championships

Top 10 absolute best scores in the pairs' free skating
No.	Team	Nation	Score	Event
1	Riku Miura; Ryuichi Kihara	Japan	158.13	2026 Winter Olympics
2	Anastasia Mishina; Aleksandr Galliamov	Russia	157.46	2022 European Championships
3	Sui Wenjing; Han Cong	China	155.60	2019 World Championships
4	Riku Miura; Ryuichi Kihara	Japan	155.55	2026 Winter Olympics (team)
5	Sui Wenjing; Han Cong	China	155.47	2022 Winter Olympics
6	Evgenia Tarasova; Vladimir Morozov	Russia	155.00	2022 Winter Olympics
7	Anastasia Mishina; Aleksandr Galliamov	Russia	154.95	2022 Winter Olympics
8	Evgenia Tarasova; Vladimir Morozov	Russia	154.85	2022 European Championships
9	Anastasia Mishina; Aleksandr Galliamov	Russia	153.37	2021 CS Finlandia Trophy
10	Anastasia Mishina; Aleksandr Galliamov	Russia	153.34	2021 Rostelecom Cup

=== Progression of pairs' highest scores ===
Progression of highest scores in the pairs' combined total
Date	Female partner	Male partner	Nation	Score	Event
Aug 5, 2018	Peng Cheng	Jin Yang	China	206.42	2018 CS Asian Open Trophy
Sep 21, 2018	Vanessa James	Morgan Ciprès	France	210.21	2018 CS Autumn Classic International
Oct 27, 2018	Vanessa James	Morgan Ciprès	France	221.81	2018 Skate Canada International
Jan 24, 2019	Vanessa James	Morgan Ciprès	France	225.66	2019 European Championships
Mar 21, 2019	Evgenia Tarasova	Vladimir Morozov	Russia	228.47	2019 World Championships
Mar 21, 2019	Sui Wenjing	Han Cong	China	234.84	2019 World Championships
Jan 13, 2022	Evgenia Tarasova	Vladimir Morozov	Russia	236.43	2022 European Championships
Jan 13, 2022	Anastasia Mishina	Aleksandr Galliamov	Russia	239.82	2022 European Championships
Feb 19, 2022	Sui Wenjing	Han Cong	China	239.88	2022 Winter Olympics

Progression of highest scores in the pairs' short program
Date	Female partner	Male partner	Nation	Score	Event
Aug 4, 2018	Peng Cheng	Jin Yang	China	71.54	2018 CS Asian Open Trophy
Sep 13, 2018	Natalia Zabiiako	Alexander Enbert	Russia	72.50	2018 CS Lombardia Trophy
Sep 20, 2018	Vanessa James	Morgan Ciprès	France	73.81	2018 CS Autumn Classic International
Oct 26, 2018	Vanessa James	Morgan Ciprès	France	74.51	2018 Skate Canada International
Nov 16, 2018	Evgenia Tarasova	Vladimir Morozov	Russia	78.47	2018 Rostelecom Cup
Mar 20, 2019	Sui Wenjing	Han Cong	China	79.24	2019 World Championships
Mar 20, 2019	Evgenia Tarasova	Vladimir Morozov	Russia	81.21	2019 World Championships
Nov 22, 2019	Sui Wenjing	Han Cong	China	81.27	2019 NHK Trophy
Jan 22, 2020	Aleksandra Boikova	Dmitrii Kozlovskii	Russia	82.34	2020 European Championships
Jan 12, 2022	Anastasia Mishina	Aleksandr Galliamov	Russia	82.36	2022 European Championships
Feb 4, 2022	Sui Wenjing	Han Cong	China	82.83	2022 Winter Olympics (team)
Feb 18, 2022	Sui Wenjing	Han Cong	China	84.41	2022 Winter Olympics

Progression of highest scores in the pairs' free skating
Date	Female partner	Male partner	Nation	Score	Event
Aug 5, 2018	Peng Cheng	Jin Yang	China	134.88	2018 CS Asian Open Trophy
Sep 21, 2018	Vanessa James	Morgan Ciprès	France	136.40	2018 CS Autumn Classic International
Oct 27, 2018	Vanessa James	Morgan Ciprès	France	147.30	2018 Skate Canada International
Dec 8, 2018	Vanessa James	Morgan Ciprès	France	148.37	2018–19 Grand Prix Final
Jan 24, 2019	Vanessa James	Morgan Ciprès	France	149.11	2019 European Championships
Mar 21, 2019	Sui Wenjing	Han Cong	China	155.60	2019 World Championships
Jan 13, 2022	Anastasia Mishina	Aleksandr Galliamov	Russia	157.46	2022 European Championships
Feb 16, 2026	Riku Miura	Ryuichi Kihara	Japan	158.13	2026 Winter Olympics

== Ice dance ==
=== Highest personal best scores in ice dance ===
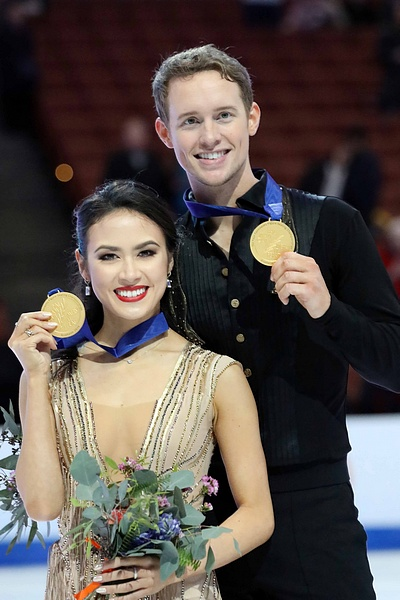
Madison Chock and Evan Bates are the record holders for the ice dance scores.

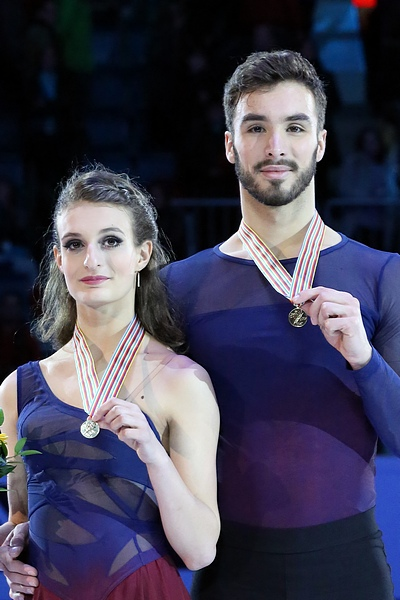
Gabriella Papadakis and Guillaume Cizeron currently hold the third highest combined total, rhythm dance, and free dance scores.

Top 10 highest personal best scores in the combined total (ice dance)
No.	Team	Nation	Score	Event
1	Madison Chock; Evan Bates	United States	232.32	2023 World Team Trophy
2	Laurence Fournier Beaudry; Guillaume Cizeron	France	230.81	2026 World Championships
3	Gabriella Papadakis; Guillaume Cizeron	France	229.82	2022 World Championships
4	Charlène Guignard; Marco Fabbri	Italy	223.24	2023 World Team Trophy
5	Madison Hubbell; Zachary Donohue	United States	222.39	2022 World Championships
6	Victoria Sinitsina; Nikita Katsalapov	Russia	221.17	2021 World Championships
7	Piper Gilles; Paul Poirier	Canada	219.68	2024 World Championships
8	Lilah Fear; Lewis Gibson	Great Britain	214.73	2023 World Championships
9	Laurence Fournier Beaudry; Nikolaj Sørensen	Canada	214.08	2023 Four Continents Championships
10	Alexandra Stepanova; Ivan Bukin	Russia	213.20	2022 European Championships

Top 10 highest personal best scores in the rhythm dance
No.	Team	Nation	Score	Event
1	Madison Chock; Evan Bates	United States	93.91	2023 World Team Trophy
2	Laurence Fournier Beaudry; Guillaume Cizeron	France	92.74	2026 World Championships
3	Gabriella Papadakis; Guillaume Cizeron	France	92.73	2022 World Championships
4	Charlène Guignard; Marco Fabbri	Italy	90.90	2023 World Team Trophy
5	Madison Hubbell; Zachary Donohue	United States	89.72	2022 World Championships
6	Victoria Sinitsina; Nikita Katsalapov	Russia	88.85	2022 Winter Olympics
7	Piper Gilles; Paul Poirier	Canada	88.37	2023 World Team Trophy
8	Lilah Fear; Lewis Gibson	Great Britain	86.85	2026 Winter Olympics (team)
9	Alexandra Stepanova; Ivan Bukin	Russia	86.45	2022 European Championships
10	Laurence Fournier Beaudry; Nikolaj Sørensen	Canada	86.28	2023 Four Continents Championships

Top 10 highest personal best scores in the free dance
No.	Team	Nation	Score	Event
1	Madison Chock; Evan Bates	United States	138.41	2023 World Team Trophy
2	Laurence Fournier Beaudry; Guillaume Cizeron	France	138,07	2026 World Championships
3	Gabriella Papadakis; Guillaume Cizeron	France	137.09	2022 World Championships
4	Piper Gilles; Paul Poirier	Canada	133.17	2024 World Championships
5	Victoria Sinitsina; Nikita Katsalapov	Russia	133.02	2021 World Championships
6	Madison Hubbell; Zachary Donohue	United States	132.67	2022 World Championships
7	Charlène Guignard; Marco Fabbri	Italy	132.34	2023 World Team Trophy
8	Lilah Fear; Lewis Gibson	Great Britain	130.26	2023 NHK Trophy
9	Laurence Fournier Beaudry; Nikolaj Sørensen	Canada	128.45	2023 World Championships
10	Alexandra Stepanova; Ivan Bukin	Russia	127.64	2020 European Championships

=== Highest personal best TES and PCS in ice dance ===
Top 10 highest personal best technical element scores in the rhythm dance
No.	Team	Nation	Score	Event
1	Madison Chock; Evan Bates	United States	55.16	2023 World Team Trophy
2	Laurence Fournier Beaudry; Guillaume Cizeron	France	54.12	2026 World Championships
3	Gabriella Papadakis; Guillaume Cizeron	France	53.16	2022 World Championships
4	Charlène Guignard; Marco Fabbri	Italy	52.94	2023 World Team Trophy
5	Madison Hubbell; Zachary Donohue	United States	50.95	2022 World Championships
6	Piper Gilles; Paul Poirier	Canada	50.61	2022 Grand Prix of Espoo
7	Victoria Sinitsina; Nikita Katsalapov	Russia	50.45	2020 European Championships
8	Lilah Fear; Lewis Gibson	Great Britain	50.08	2026 Winter Olympics (team)
9	Laurence Fournier Beaudry; Nikolaj Sørensen	Canada	49.47	2022 NHK Trophy
10	Diana Davis; Gleb Smolkin	Georgia	48.99	2026 CS Trialeti Trophy

Top 10 highest personal best technical element scores in the free dance
No.	Team	Nation	Score	Event
1	Madison Chock; Evan Bates	United States	79.41	2023 World Team Trophy
2	Laurence Fournier Beaudry; Guillaume Cizeron	France	78.85	2026 World Championships
3	Gabriella Papadakis; Guillaume Cizeron	France	77.40	2019 NHK Trophy
4	Piper Gilles; Paul Poirier	Canada	75.25	2024 World Championships
5	Charlène Guignard; Marco Fabbri	Italy	74.90	2023 World Team Trophy
6	Victoria Sinitsina; Nikita Katsalapov	Russia	74.57	2021 World Championships
7	Madison Hubbell; Zachary Donohue	United States	74.37	2022 World Championships
8	Lilah Fear; Lewis Gibson	Great Britain	73.98	2023 NHK Trophy
9	Laurence Fournier Beaudry; Nikolaj Sørensen	Canada	72.73	2023 World Championships
10	Marjorie Lajoie; Zachary Lagha	Canada	71.15	2024 World Championships

Top 10 highest personal best program component scores in the rhythm dance
No.	Team	Nation	Score	Event
1	Gabriella Papadakis; Guillaume Cizeron	France	39.57	2022 World Championships
2	Madison Hubbell; Zachary Donohue	United States	38.77	2022 World Championships
3	Victoria Sinitsina; Nikita Katsalapov	Russia	38.76	2021 NHK Trophy
4	Madison Chock; Evan Bates	United States	38.75	2023 World Team Trophy
5	Laurence Fournier Beaudry; Guillaume Cizeron	France	38.62	2026 World Championships
6	Charlène Guignard; Marco Fabbri	Italy	37.96	2023 World Team Trophy
7	Piper Gilles; Paul Poirier	Canada	37.91	2023 World Team Trophy
8	Kaitlyn Weaver; Andrew Poje	Canada	37.60	2019 World Championships
9	Alexandra Stepanova; Ivan Bukin	Russia	37.51	2019 European Championships
10	Lilah Fear; Lewis Gibson	Great Britain	37.11	2024 CS Nepela Memorial

Top 10 highest personal best program component scores in the free dance
No.	Team	Nation	Score	Event
1	Gabriella Papadakis; Guillaume Cizeron	France	59.70	2022 World Championships
2	Laurence Fournier Beaudry; Guillaume Cizeron	France	59.22	2026 World Championships
3	Madison Chock; Evan Bates	United States	59.00	2023 World Team Trophy
4	Victoria Sinitsina; Nikita Katsalapov	Russia	58.62	2021 NHK Trophy
5	Madison Hubbell; Zachary Donohue	United States	58.33	2022 Winter Olympics
6	Piper Gilles; Paul Poirier	Canada	57.92	2024 World Championships
7	Charlène Guignard; Marco Fabbri	Italy	57.44	2023 World Team Trophy
8	Alexandra Stepanova; Ivan Bukin	Russia	57.22	2018 Rostelecom Cup
9	Lilah Fear; Lewis Gibson	Great Britain	56.28	2023 NHK Trophy
10	Kaitlyn Weaver; Andrew Poje	Canada	56.08	2019 Four Continents Championships

=== Absolute best scores in ice dance ===
Top 10 absolute best scores in the combined total (ice dance)
No.	Team	Nation	Score	Event
1	Madison Chock; Evan Bates	United States	232.32	2023 World Team Trophy
2	Laurence Fournier Beaudry; Guillaume Cizeron	France	230.81	2026 World Championships
3	Gabriella Papadakis; Guillaume Cizeron	France	229.82	2022 World Championships
4	Gabriella Papadakis; Guillaume Cizeron	France	226.98	2022 Winter Olympics
5	Gabriella Papadakis; Guillaume Cizeron	France	226.61	2019 NHK Trophy
6	Madison Chock; Evan Bates	United States	226.01	2023 World Championships
7	Laurence Fournier Beaudry; Guillaume Cizeron	France	225.82	2026 Winter Olympics
8	Madison Chock; Evan Bates	United States	224.76	2025 World Team Trophy
9	Madison Chock; Evan Bates	United States	224.39	2026 Winter Olympics
10	Charlène Guignard; Marco Fabbri	Italy	223.24	2023 World Team Trophy

Top 10 absolute best scores in the rhythm dance
No.	Team	Nation	Score	Event
1	Madison Chock; Evan Bates	United States	93.91	2023 World Team Trophy
2	Laurence Fournier Beaudry; Guillaume Cizeron	France	92.74	2026 World Championships
3	Gabriella Papadakis; Guillaume Cizeron	France	92.73	2022 World Championships
4	Madison Chock; Evan Bates	United States	91.94	2023 World Championships
5	Madison Chock; Evan Bates	United States	91.25	2025 World Team Trophy
6	Madison Chock; Evan Bates	United States	91.06	2026 Winter Olympics (team)
7	Charlène Guignard; Marco Fabbri	Italy	90.90	2023 World Team Trophy
8	Gabriella Papadakis; Guillaume Cizeron	France	90.83	2022 Winter Olympics
9	Madison Chock; Evan Bates	United States	90.18	2025 World Championships
10	Laurence Fournier Beaudry; Guillaume Cizeron	France	90.18	2026 Winter Olympics

Top 10 absolute best scores in the free dance
No.	Team	Nation	Score	Event
1	Madison Chock; Evan Bates	United States	138.41	2023 World Team Trophy
2	Laurence Fournier Beaudry; Guillaume Cizeron	France	138.07	2026 World Championships
3	Gabriella Papadakis; Guillaume Cizeron	France	137.09	2022 World Championships
4	Gabriella Papadakis; Guillaume Cizeron	France	136.58	2019 NHK Trophy
5	Gabriella Papadakis; Guillaume Cizeron	France	136.15	2022 Winter Olympics
6	Gabriella Papadakis; Guillaume Cizeron	France	136.02	2019–20 Grand Prix Final
7	Gabriella Papadakis; Guillaume Cizeron	France	135.82	2019 World Team Trophy
8	Laurence Fournier Beaudry; Guillaume Cizeron	France	135.64	2026 Winter Olympics
9	Laurence Fournier Beaudry; Guillaume Cizeron	France	135.50	2026 European Championships
10	Madison Chock; Evan Bates	United States	134.67	2026 Winter Olympics

=== Progression of highest scores in ice dance ===
Progression of highest scores in the combined total (ice dance)
Date	Female partner	Male partner	Nation	Score	Event
Aug 5, 2018	Wang Shiyue	Liu Xinyu	China	160.54	2018 CS Asian Open Trophy
Sep 8, 2018	Arina Ushakova	Maxim Nekrasov	Russia	168.17	2018 JGP Lithuania
Sep 15, 2018	Sara Hurtado	Kirill Khaliavin	Spain	169.47	2018 CS Lombardia Trophy
Sep 15, 2018	Rachel Parsons	Michael Parsons	United States	170.68	2018 CS Lombardia Trophy
Sep 15, 2018	Charlène Guignard	Marco Fabbri	Italy	193.28	2018 CS Lombardia Trophy
Sep 15, 2018	Madison Hubbell	Zachary Donohue	United States	197.42	2018 CS U.S. International Classic
Oct 7, 2018	Alexandra Stepanova	Ivan Bukin	Russia	200.78	2018 CS Finlandia Trophy
Oct 21, 2018	Madison Hubbell	Zachary Donohue	United States	200.82	2018 Skate America
Nov 24, 2018	Gabriella Papadakis	Guillaume Cizeron	France	216.78	2018 Internationaux de France
Jan 26, 2019	Gabriella Papadakis	Guillaume Cizeron	France	217.98	2019 European Championships
Mar 23, 2019	Gabriella Papadakis	Guillaume Cizeron	France	222.65	2019 World Championships
Apr 12, 2019	Gabriella Papadakis	Guillaume Cizeron	France	223.13	2019 World Team Trophy
Nov 23, 2019	Gabriella Papadakis	Guillaume Cizeron	France	226.61	2019 NHK Trophy
Feb 14, 2022	Gabriella Papadakis	Guillaume Cizeron	France	226.98	2022 Winter Olympics
Mar 26, 2022	Gabriella Papadakis	Guillaume Cizeron	France	229.82	2022 World Championships
Apr 14, 2023	Madison Chock	Evan Bates	United States	232.32	2023 World Team Trophy

Progression of highest scores in the rhythm dance
Date	Female partner	Male partner	Nation	Score	Event
Aug 4, 2018	Rachel Parsons	Michael Parsons	United States	64.47	2018 CS Asian Open Trophy
Sep 7, 2018	Arina Ushakova	Maxim Nekrasov	Russia	67.63	2018 JGP Lithuania
Sep 14, 2018	Charlène Guignard	Marco Fabbri	Italy	76.03	2018 CS Lombardia Trophy
Sep 14, 2018	Madison Hubbell	Zachary Donohue	United States	79.11	2018 CS U.S. International Classic
Oct 6, 2018	Alexandra Stepanova	Ivan Bukin	Russia	79.16	2018 CS Finlandia Trophy
Oct 26, 2018	Madison Hubbell	Zachary Donohue	United States	80.49	2018 Skate Canada International
Nov 23, 2018	Gabriella Papadakis	Guillaume Cizeron	France	84.13	2018 Internationaux de France
Jan 25, 2019	Gabriella Papadakis	Guillaume Cizeron	France	84.79	2019 European Championships
Mar 22, 2019	Gabriella Papadakis	Guillaume Cizeron	France	88.42	2019 World Championships
Nov 1, 2019	Gabriella Papadakis	Guillaume Cizeron	France	88.69	2019 Internationaux de France
Nov 22, 2019	Gabriella Papadakis	Guillaume Cizeron	France	90.03	2019 NHK Trophy
Feb 12, 2022	Gabriella Papadakis	Guillaume Cizeron	France	90.83	2022 Winter Olympics
Mar 25, 2022	Gabriella Papadakis	Guillaume Cizeron	France	92.73	2022 World Championships
Apr 13, 2023	Madison Chock	Evan Bates	United States	93.91	2023 World Team Trophy

Progression of highest scores in the free dance
Date	Female partner	Male partner	Nation	Score	Event
Aug 5, 2018	Wang Shiyue	Liu Xinyu	China	96.94	2018 CS Asian Open Trophy
Sep 8, 2018	Arina Ushakova	Maxim Nekrasov	Russia	100.54	2018 JGP Lithuania
Sep 14, 2018	Marjorie Lajoie	Zachary Lagha	Canada	100.95	2018 JGP Canada
Sep 15, 2018	Sara Hurtado	Kirill Khaliavin	Spain	104.44	2018 CS Lombardia Trophy
Sep 15, 2018	Charlène Guignard	Marco Fabbri	Italy	117.25	2018 CS Lombardia Trophy
Sep 15, 2018	Madison Hubbell	Zachary Donohue	United States	118.31	2018 CS U.S. International Classic
Sep 22, 2018	Victoria Sinitsina	Nikita Katsalapov	Russia	120.46	2018 CS Ondrej Nepela Trophy
Sep 22, 2018	Kaitlyn Weaver	Andrew Poje	Canada	120.74	2018 CS Autumn Classic International
Oct 7, 2018	Alexandra Stepanova	Ivan Bukin	Russia	121.62	2018 CS Finlandia Trophy
Oct 21, 2018	Madison Hubbell	Zachary Donohue	United States	122.39	2018 Skate America
Nov 17, 2018	Alexandra Stepanova	Ivan Bukin	Russia	124.94	2018 Rostelecom Cup
Nov 24, 2018	Gabriella Papadakis	Guillaume Cizeron	France	132.65	2018 Internationaux de France
Jan 26, 2019	Gabriella Papadakis	Guillaume Cizeron	France	133.19	2019 European Championships
Mar 23, 2019	Gabriella Papadakis	Guillaume Cizeron	France	134.23	2019 World Championships
Apr 12, 2019	Gabriella Papadakis	Guillaume Cizeron	France	135.82	2019 World Team Trophy
Nov 23, 2019	Gabriella Papadakis	Guillaume Cizeron	France	136.58	2019 NHK Trophy
Mar 26, 2022	Gabriella Papadakis	Guillaume Cizeron	France	137.09	2022 World Championships
Apr 14, 2023	Madison Chock	Evan Bates	United States	138.41	2023 World Team Trophy

== See also ==
- List of highest junior scores in figure skating
- List of highest historical scores in figure skating
- List of highest historical junior scores in figure skating
- ISU Judging System
