= Figure skating at the 2022 Winter Olympics – Pairs =

Pair skating at the XXIV Olympic Winter Games
- Venue: Capital Indoor Stadium; Beijing, China
- Dates: 18–19 February 2022
- Competitors: 19 teams from 13 nations
- Winning score: 239.88 points

Medalists
1st place, gold medalist(s)		Sui Wenjing and Han Cong	China
2nd place, silver medalist(s)		Evgenia Tarasova and Vladimir Morozov	ROC
3rd place, bronze medalist(s)		Anastasia Mishina and Aleksandr Galliamov	ROC

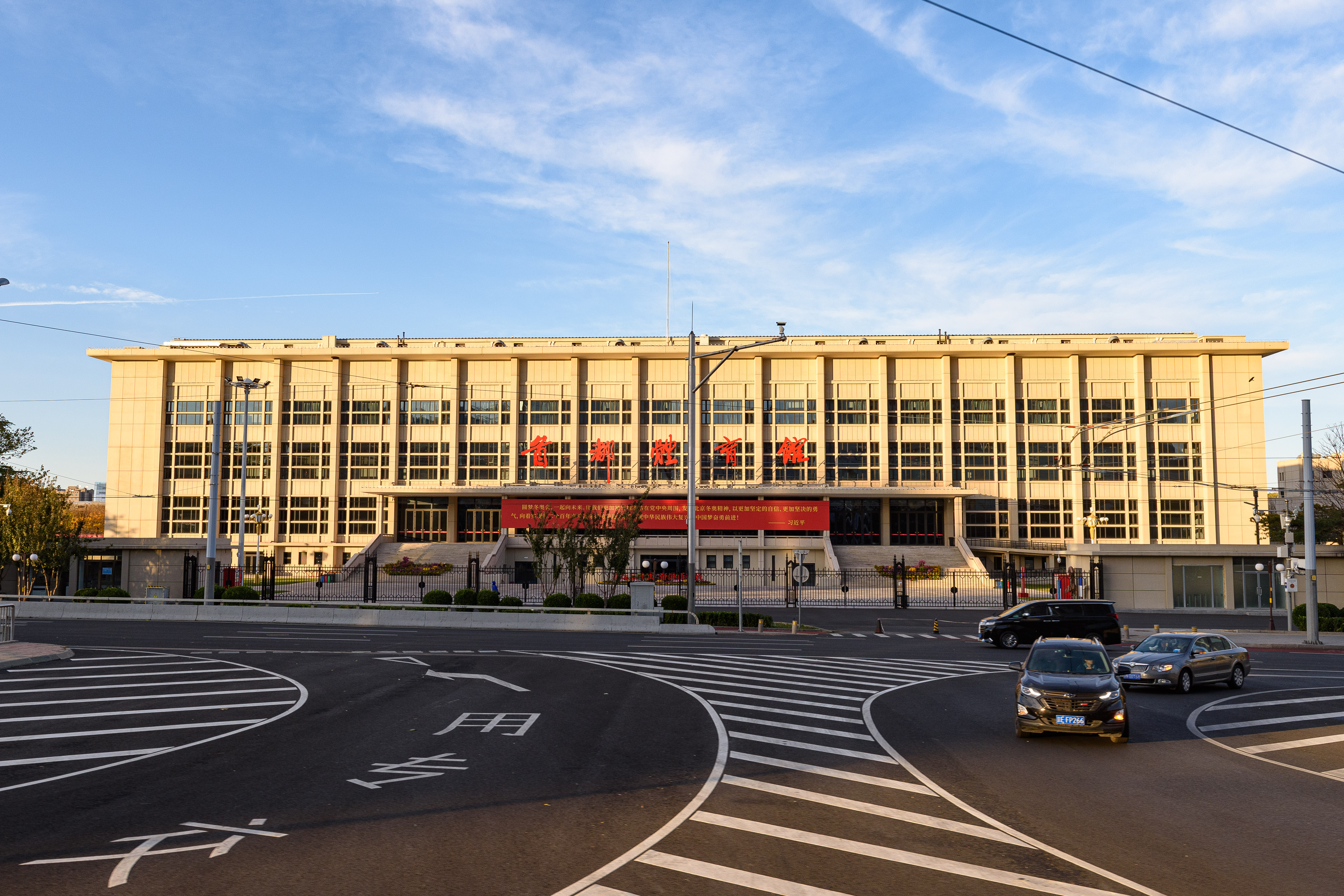
The figure skating events at the 2022 Winter Olympics were held at the Capital Indoor Stadium in Beijing, China.

The pairs figure skating competition at the 2022 Winter Olympics was held on 18 and 19 February at the Capital Indoor Stadium in Beijing, China, and featured 19 teams from 13 different nations. Sui Wenjing and Han Cong of China won the gold medals, while Evgenia Tarasova and Vladimir Morozov, and Anastasia Mishina and Aleksandr Galliamov, both representing the Russian Olympic Committee, won the silver and bronze, respectively. In addition to winning the competition, Sui and Han set new world record scores in both the short program and overall total.

== Background ==
In 2016, an independent report commissioned by the World Anti-Doping Agency (WADA) confirmed allegations that the Russian Olympic team had been involved in a state-sponsored doping program from at least late 2011 through February 2014, when Russia hosted the Winter Olympics in Sochi. On 9 December 2019, the WADA banned Russia from all international competitions after it found that data provided by the Russian Anti-Doping Agency had been manipulated by Russian authorities in order to protect athletes involved in its doping scheme. Under a ruling by the Court of Arbitration for Sport in December 2020, Russian athletes could not use the Russian flag or anthem in international competition and had to compete as "Neutral Athletes" or a "Neutral Team" at any world championships for the next two years. On 19 February 2021, it was announced that Russian athletes would compete under the name of the Russian Olympic Committee (ROC) at the 2020 Summer Olympics and 2022 Winter Olympics.

The pair skating competition at the 2022 Winter Olympics was held on 18 and 19 February at the Capital Indoor Stadium in Beijing, China. The competition featured 19 teams representing 13 nations. Sui Wenjing and Han Cong of China had finished in second place at the 2018 Winter Olympics, despite having been in the lead after the short program, when they finished third after the free skate, ultimately losing the gold medal by 0.43 points. Sui and Han were also two-time world champions (2017 and 2019). They finished second at the 2021 World Championships, losing to Anastasia Mishina and Aleksandr Galliamov of Russia, who also won the 2022 European Figure Skating Championships. Other likely contenders for Olympic medals were Aleksandra Boikova and Dmitrii Kozlovskii of Russia, who finished in third place at the 2021 World Championships, and three-time world medalists Evgenia Tarasova and Vladimir Morozov, also of Russia.

The 2022 Winter Olympics took place over two years into the COVID-19 pandemic and most events were closed to the public, with only selected events open to invited guests at a reduced capacity. To minimize the risk of virus transmission, China implemented strict health and safety measures, including a closed-loop system that segregated participants from the general public, frequent testing, and quarantine protocols for participants. Amid increasing lockdowns across China and the first detected case of the Omicron variant in Beijing, ticket sales to the general public were cancelled and it was announced that limited numbers of spectators would be admitted by invitation only.

== Qualification ==
Sixteen quota spots in pair skating were awarded based on the results at the 2021 World Figure Skating Championships. An additional three quota spots were earned at the 2021 Nebelhorn Trophy.

Qualifying nations in pairs
Event	Teams per NOC	Qualifying NOCs	Total teams
2021 World Championships	3	ROC	16
2021 World Championships	2	China; Canada; United States; Italy	16
2021 World Championships	1	Japan; Austria; Germany; Hungary; Czech Republic	16
2021 Nebelhorn Trophy	1	Spain; Georgia; Israel	3
Total			19

== Required performance elements ==
Couples competing in pair skating performed their short programs on 18 February. Lasting no more than 2 minutes 40 seconds, the short program had to include the following elements: one pair lift, one twist lift, one double or triple throw jump, one double or triple solo jump, one solo spin combination with a change of foot, one death spiral, and a step sequence using the full ice surface.

The sixteen highest-scoring couples after completion of the short program moved on to their free skates, which were performed on 19 February. The free skate could last no more than 4 minutes, and had to include the following: three pair lifts, of which one had to be a twist lift; two different throw jumps; one solo jump; one jump combination or sequence; one pair spin combination; one death spiral; and a choreographic sequence.

== Judging ==
Skaters were judged according to the required technical elements of their program (such as jumps and spins), as well as the overall presentation of their program, based on five program components (skating skills, transitions, performance, composition, and musical interpretation). Each technical element in a figure skating performance was assigned a predetermined base point value and scored by a panel of nine judges on a scale from –5 to +5 based on the quality of its execution. Each Grade of Execution (GOE) from –5 to +5 was assigned a value as indicated on the Scale of Values. (Note: The International Skating Union had originally published a new Scale of Values for the 2020/21 season, but chose to cancel it, reverting back to the scale from the 2019/20 season.) For example, a triple Axel was worth a base value of 8.00 points, and a GOE of +3 was worth 2.40 points, so a triple Axel with a GOE of +3 earned 10.40 points. The judging panel's GOE for each element was determined by calculating the trimmed mean (the average after discarding the highest and lowest scores). The panel's scores for all elements were added together to generate a Total Elements Score. At the same time, the judges evaluated each performance based on the five aforementioned program components and assigned each a score from 0.25 to 10 in 0.25-point increments. The judging panel's final score for each program component was also determined by calculating the trimmed mean. Those scores were then multiplied by the factor shown on the chart below; the results were added together to generate a total Program Component Score.

Program component factoring
Discipline	Short program	Free skate
Pairs	0.80	1.60

Deductions were applied for certain violations, such as time infractions or falls. The Total Elements Score and Program Component Score were then added together, minus any deductions, to generate a final performance score for each team.

== Results ==
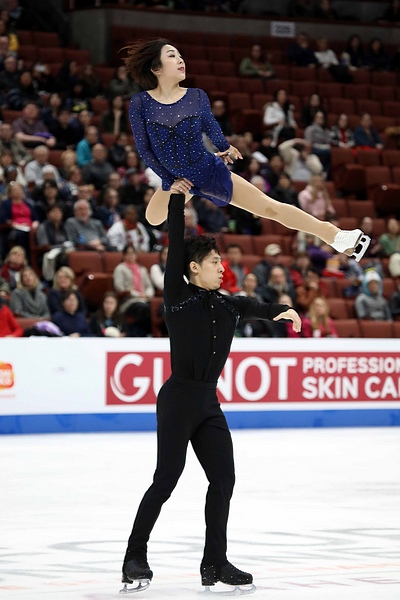
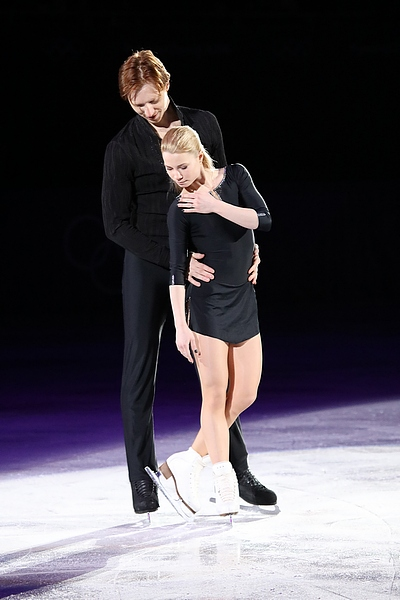
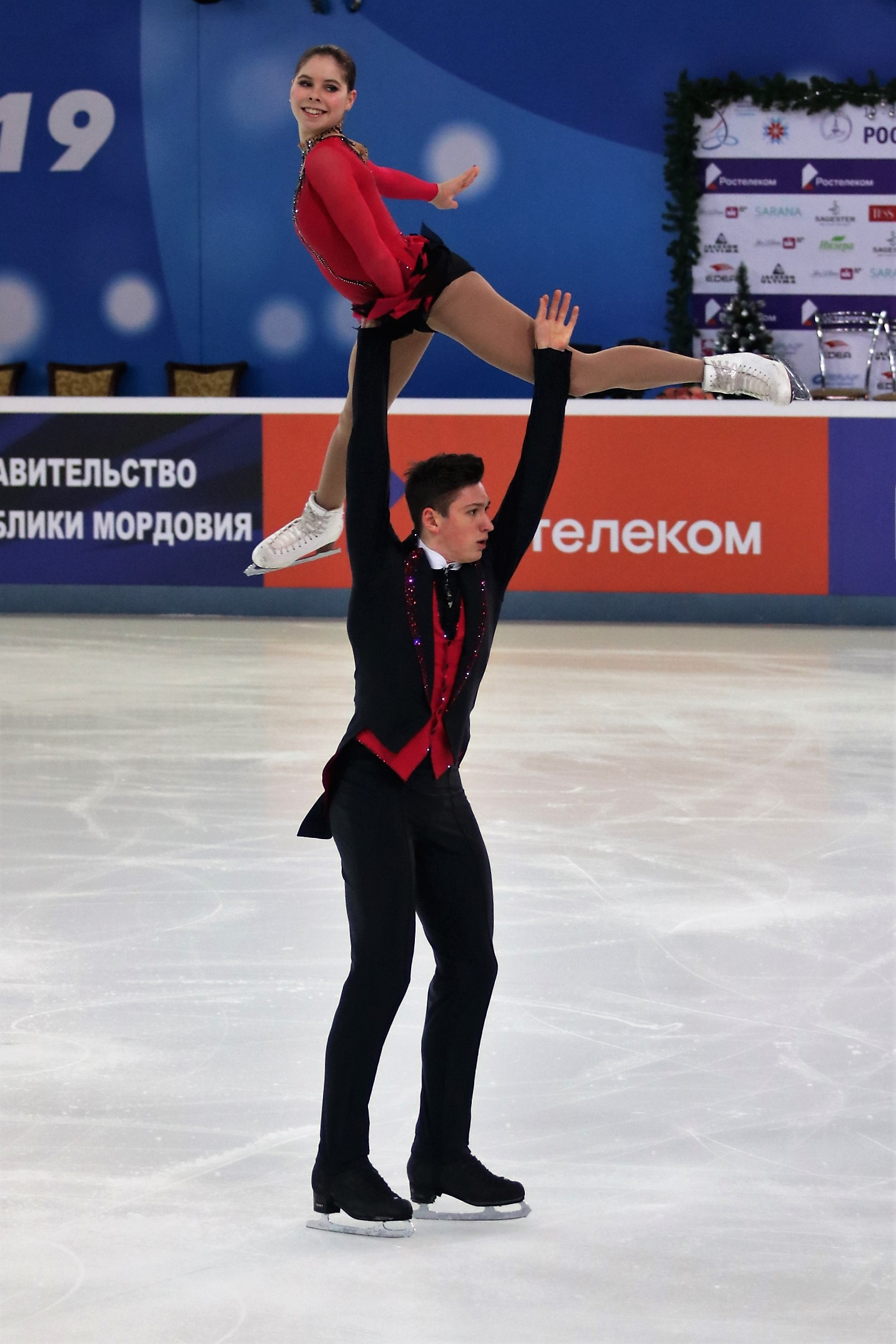
The gold, silver, and bronze medalists from the pairs event at the 2022 Winter Olympics (from left to right):
Sui Wenjing and Han Cong of China (gold); Evgenia Tarasova and Vladimir Morozov of Russia (silver); and Anastasia Mishina and Aleksandr Galliamov of Russia (bronze)

Code key

- TSS – Total Segment Score
- TES – Total Elements Score
- PCS – Program Component Score
- SS – Skating skills
- TR – Transitions
- PE – Performance
- CO – Composition
- IN – Musical interpretation
- DED – Deductions

=== Short program ===
The pairs short program was held on 18 February. Sui Wenjing and Han Cong of China broke their own world record in the short program that had set earlier in the team event. Their score of 84.41 gave Sui and Han a lead of just 0.16 points over Evgenia Tarasova and Vladimir Morozov of Russia. The performance from Tarasova and Morozov included a "perfect" triple toe loop and a throw triple twist, and they received level four marks (the highest marks possible) on all of their elements. They were followed by Anastasia Mishina and Aleksandr Galliamov of Russia, and Aleksandra Boikova and Dmitrii Kozlovskii, also of Russia, placing the Russian teams in three of the top four positions. Alexa Knierim and Brandon Frazier of the United States, who had been forced to withdraw from the 2022 U.S. Figure Skating Championships after Frazier contracted COVID-19, were "nearly perfect". Ashley Cain-Gribble and Timothy LeDuc, also of the United States, finished only one-tenth of a point behind Knierim and Frazier. Minerva Fabienne Hase and Nolan Seegert of Germany, who had been forced to withdraw from the team event after Seegert tested positive for COVID-19, were finally able to compete after missing ten days of practice. At the same time, Ioulia Chtchetinina and Márk Magyar of Hungary withdrew from the competition prior to the short program after Magyar tested positive for COVID-19.

Pairs short program results
Pl.	Team	Nation	TSS	TES	PCS	SS	TR	PE	CO	IN	DED
1	Sui Wenjing; Han Cong	China	84.41	45.96	38.45	9.54	9.43	9.79	9.64	9.68	0.00
2	Evgenia Tarasova; Vladimir Morozov	ROC	84.25	46.04	38.21	9.61	9.39	9.57	9.57	9.61	0.00
3	Anastasia Mishina; Aleksandr Galliamov	ROC	82.76	44.95	37.81	9.25	9.32	9.57	9.54	9.57	0.00
4	Aleksandra Boikova; Dmitrii Kozlovskii	ROC	78.59	42.17	36.42	9.04	8.93	9.18	9.14	9.25	0.00
5	Peng Cheng; Jin Yang	China	76.10	40.87	35.23	8.79	8.68	8.93	8.82	8.82	0.00
6	Alexa Knierim; Brandon Frazier	United States	74.23	40.64	33.59	8.39	8.21	8.43	8.50	8.46	0.00
7	Ashley Cain-Gribble; Timothy LeDuc	United States	74.13	39.91	34.22	8.46	8.39	8.57	8.64	8.71	0.00
8	Riku Miura; Ryuichi Kihara	Japan	70.85	36.39	34.46	8.71	8.54	8.57	8.71	8.54	0.00
9	Karina Safina; Luka Berulava	Georgia	66.11	36.74	29.37	7.39	7.29	7.36	7.39	7.29	0.00
10	Nicole Della Monica; Matteo Guarise	Italy	63.58	33.16	31.42	7.93	7.68	7.75	8.04	7.89	1.00
11	Laura Barquero; Marco Zandron	Spain	63.34	34.63	28.71	7.14	7.04	7.18	7.32	7.21	0.00
12	Vanessa James; Eric Radford	Canada	63.03	30.37	32.66	8.21	8.11	8.04	8.21	8.25	0.00
13	Kirsten Moore-Towers; Michael Marinaro	Canada	62.51	31.94	32.57	8.25	8.18	7.82	8.32	8.14	2.00
14	Minerva Fabienne Hase; Nolan Seegert	Germany	62.37	32.45	30.92	7.79	7.71	7.57	7.82	7.75	1.00
15	Hailey Kops; Evgeni Krasnopolski	Israel	55.99	30.59	25.40	6.25	6.25	6.43	6.46	6.36	0.00
16	Rebecca Ghilardi; Filippo Ambrosini	Italy	55.83	28.38	29.45	7.39	7.18	7.32	7.50	7.43	2.00
17	Jelizaveta Žuková; Martin Bidař	Czech Republic	54.64	29.56	27.08	6.89	6.75	6.54	7.00	6.68	2.00
18	Miriam Ziegler; Severin Kiefer	Austria	51.96	24.53	27.43	7.00	6.89	6.61	7.00	6.79	0.00
WD	Ioulia Chtchetinina; Márk Magyar	Hungary	Withdrew from competition								

=== Free skating ===
The pairs free skating was held on 19 February. Sui Wenjing and Han Cong finished first in the free skate, winning gold and finding redemption from their silver medal finish at the 2018 Winter Olympics. They ultimately finished 0.63 points ahead of Evgenia Tarasova and Vladimir Morozov, and began crying tears of joy when their scores were posted. Sui and Han's performance featured the only quadruple twist lift of the competition. "We've been thinking about the quadruple twist for a long time, ever since [the 2018 Olympics in] PyeongChang," Sui explained. "We thought with the quadruple twist, we can get more [points] … After all, the Olympic spirit is faster, higher, stronger, so for us ... we wanted to showcase our best program and always want to pursue the highest level of the Olympic spirit." Sui and Han cited Shen Xue and Zhao Hongbo – the Chinese pairs skaters who won bronze at the 2002 and 2006 Winter Olympics, and finally gold at the 2010 Winter Olympics – as a source of inspiration. Shen and Zhao were married in the Capital Indoor Stadium, where the 2026 Olympic figure skating events were contested. Sui said that she had begun skating after watching Shen and Zhao win in 2010. Han described his gold medal with Sui as "indeed a legacy from [Shen and Zhao]".

As teams competed in reverse order of how they finished in the short program, Sui and Han performed last, preceded by the three Russian teams. Each Russian team took the lead, only to cede it to the next Russian team. Ultimately, Evgenia Tarasova and Vladimir Morozov finished in second place, Anastasia Mishina and Aleksandr Galliamov finished in third place, and Aleksandra Boikova and Dmitrii Kozlovskii finished in fourth.

Pairs free skate results
Pl.	Team	Nation	TSS	TES	PCS	SS	TR	PE	CO	IN	DED
1	Sui Wenjing; Han Cong	China	155.47	78.61	76.86	9.71	9.61	9.50	9.71	9.50	0.00
2	Evgenia Tarasova; Vladimir Morozov	ROC	155.00	78.01	76.99	9.54	9.54	9.68	9.68	9.68	0.00
3	Anastasia Mishina; Aleksandr Galliamov	ROC	154.95	79.71	75.24	9.32	9.29	9.57	9.46	9.39	0.00
4	Aleksandra Boikova; Dmitrii Kozlovskii	ROC	141.91	70.75	71.16	9.00	8.86	8.79	8.96	8.86	0.00
5	Riku Miura; Ryuichi Kihara	Japan	141.04	69.95	71.09	8.96	8.68	9.04	8.89	8.86	0.00
6	Peng Cheng; Jin Yang	China	138.74	69.03	69.71	8.71	8.54	8.75	8.75	8.82	0.00
7	Alexa Knierim; Brandon Frazier	United States	138.45	68.97	69.48	8.64	8.57	8.79	8.75	8.68	0.00
8	Karina Safina; Luka Berulava	Georgia	126.33	63.88	62.45	7.82	7.61	8.00	7.89	7.71	0.00
9	Ashley Cain-Gribble; Timothy LeDuc	United States	123.92	59.74	66.18	8.29	8.29	8.00	8.50	8.29	2.00
10	Kirsten Moore-Towers; Michael Marinaro	Canada	118.86	53.83	65.03	8.04	8.00	8.07	8.25	8.29	0.00
11	Laura Barquero; Marco Zandron	Spain	118.02	57.90	60.12	7.61	7.39	7.46	7.61	7.50	0.00
12	Vanessa James; Eric Radford	Canada	117.96	53.98	64.98	8.11	7.96	8.11	8.29	8.14	1.00
13	Nicole Della Monica; Matteo Guarise	Italy	116.29	54.05	62.24	7.86	7.61	7.75	7.89	7.79	0.00
14	Rebecca Ghilardi; Filippo Ambrosini	Italy	109.60	54.82	54.78	6.89	6.64	6.89	6.96	6.86	0.00
15	Hailey Kops; Evgeni Krasnopolski	Israel	97.83	47.20	50.63	6.43	6.11	6.39	6.46	6.25	0.00
16	Minerva Fabienne Hase; Nolan Seegert	Germany	87.32	36.67	51.65	6.89	6.43	5.93	6.57	6.46	1.00

=== Overall ===
Pairs results
Rank	Team	Nation	Total	SP		FS	
1st place, gold medalist(s)	Sui Wenjing; Han Cong	China	239.88	1	84.41	1	155.47
2nd place, silver medalist(s)	Evgenia Tarasova; Vladimir Morozov	ROC	239.25	2	84.25	2	155.00
3rd place, bronze medalist(s)	Anastasia Mishina; Aleksandr Galliamov	ROC	237.71	3	82.76	3	154.95
4	Aleksandra Boikova; Dmitrii Kozlovskii	ROC	220.50	4	78.59	4	141.91
5	Peng Cheng; Jin Yang	China	214.84	5	76.10	6	138.74
6	Alexa Knierim; Brandon Frazier	United States	212.68	6	74.23	7	138.45
7	Riku Miura; Ryuichi Kihara	Japan	211.89	8	70.85	5	141.04
8	Ashley Cain-Gribble; Timothy LeDuc	United States	198.05	7	74.13	9	123.92
9	Karina Safina; Luka Berulava	Georgia	192.44	9	66.11	8	126.33
10	Kirsten Moore-Towers; Michael Marinaro	Canada	181.37	13	62.51	10	118.86
11	Laura Barquero; Marco Zandron	Spain	181.36	11	63.34	11	118.02
12	Vanessa James; Eric Radford	Canada	180.99	12	63.03	12	117.96
13	Nicole Della Monica; Matteo Guarise	Italy	179.87	10	63.58	13	116.29
14	Rebecca Ghilardi; Filippo Ambrosini	Italy	165.43	16	55.83	14	109.60
15	Hailey Kops; Evgeni Krasnopolski	Israel	153.82	15	55.99	15	97.83
16	Minerva Fabienne Hase; Nolan Seegert	Germany	149.69	14	62.37	16	87.32
17	Jelizaveta Žuková; Martin Bidař	Czech Republic	54.64	17	54.64	Did not advance to free skate	
18	Miriam Ziegler; Severin Kiefer	Austria	51.96	18	51.96	Did not advance to free skate	

== Records ==
The following new record high scores were set during this event.

Record high scores
Date	Team	Segment	Score	Ref.
18 February	(China); Sui Wenjing; Han Cong	Short program	84.41	
19 February	(China); Sui Wenjing; Han Cong	Total score	239.88	

== Works cited ==
- "Special Regulations & Technical Rules – Single & Pair Skating and Ice Dance 2021". International Skating Union. Archived from the original on 4 April 2022.
