= 2019 ISU World Team Trophy in Figure Skating =

Figure skating competition

2019 World Team Trophy
- Type: ISU Event
- Date: April 11 – 14
- Season: 2018–19
- Location: Fukuoka, Japan
- Host: Japan Skating Federation
- Venue: Marine Messe
- Previous: 2017 ISU World Team Trophy
- Next: 2021 ISU World Team Trophy

The 2019 ISU World Team Trophy is an international figure skating competition that was held from April 11–14, 2019 in Fukuoka, Japan. The top six International Skating Union members were invited to compete in a team format with points awarded based on skaters' placement. Participating countries selected two men's single skaters, two ladies' single skaters, one pair, and one ice dance entry for their team.

== Records ==
The following new ISU best scores were set during this competition:

Event	Component	Skater(s)	Score	Date	Ref
Ladies	Short program	(Japan) Rika Kihira	83.97	April 11, 2019	
Ice dancing	Free dance	(France) Gabriella Papadakis / Guillaume Cizeron	135.82	April 12, 2019	
Ice dancing	Total score	(France) Gabriella Papadakis / Guillaume Cizeron	223.13	April 12, 2019	

== Scoring ==
Skaters competed in both the short program/rhythm dance and the free skating/free dance segments for their team. Each segment was scored separately. The points earned per placement are as follows:

Placement	Points (Singles)	Points (Pairs/Dance)
1st	12	
2nd	11	
3rd	10	
4th	9	
5th	8	
6th	7	
7th	6	—N/a
8th	5	—N/a
9th	4	—N/a
10th	3	—N/a
11th	2	—N/a
12th	1	—N/a

Tie-breaking within a segment:

1. If two or more skaters, pairs, or ice dance couples have the same rank in a segment, then the total technical score will be used to break ties.

If these results do not break the tie, the competitors concerned will be considered tied. The team points will be awarded according to the placement of the skaters/couples in each discipline.

Tie-breaking within team standings:

1. The highest total team points from the two best places in different disciplines of the current phase will break the ties.
2. If they remain tied, the highest total segment scores of the two best places according to the team points in different disciplines of the current phase will break the ties.
3. If they remain tied, the highest total team points from the three best places in different disciplines of the current phase will break the ties.
4. If they remain tied, the highest total segment scores of the three best places according to the team points in different disciplines of the current phase will break the ties.

If these criteria fail to break the ties, the teams will be considered as tied.

== Entries ==
Names with an asterisk (*) denote the team captain.

Country	Men	Ladies	Pairs	Ice dancing
Canada	Keegan Messing; Nam Nguyen	Alaine Chartrand; Gabrielle Daleman	Kirsten Moore-Towers / Michael Marinaro	Kaitlyn Weaver / Andrew Poje*
France	Kévin Aymoz; Adam Siao Him Fa	Laurine Lecavelier; Maé-Bérénice Méité	Vanessa James / Morgan Ciprès*	Gabriella Papadakis / Guillaume Cizeron
Italy	Daniel Grassl; Matteo Rizzo	Marina Piredda; Roberta Rodeghiero	Nicole Della Monica / Matteo Guarise	Charlène Guignard / Marco Fabbri*
Japan	Keiji Tanaka; Shoma Uno	Rika Kihira; Kaori Sakamoto	Riku Miura / Shoya Ichihashi	Misato Komatsubara* / Tim Koleto
Russia	Andrei Lazukin; Alexander Samarin	Sofia Samodurova; Elizaveta Tuktamysheva	Natalia Zabiiako / Alexander Enbert	Victoria Sinitsina / Nikita Katsalapov*
United States	Nathan Chen; Vincent Zhou	Mariah Bell; Bradie Tennell	Ashley Cain / Timothy LeDuc	Madison Hubbell* / Zachary Donohue

=== Changes to preliminary assignments ===
Date	Discipline	Withdrew	Added	Reason/Other notes	Refs
April 2	Men	(Russia) Mikhail Kolyada	(Russia) Andrei Lazukin	Medical (relapse of sinusitis)	

== Results ==
=== Team standings ===
Rank	Nation	Men		Ladies		Pairs		Ice dancing		Total team points
Rank	Nation	SP	FS	SP	FS	SP	FS	RD	FD	Total team points
1	United States	12	12	9	11	8	8	10	10	117
1	United States	11	11	8	7	8	8	10	10	117
2	Japan	10	10	12	10	7	7	7	7	104
2	Japan	9	7	10	8	7	7	7	7	104
3	Russia	8	5	11	12	12	11	11	11	102
3	Russia	1	4	7	9	12	11	11	11	102
4	France	5	3	5	5	11	12	12	12	75
4	France	2	1	3	4	11	12	12	12	75
5	Canada	6	9	6	3	9	10	8	9	73
5	Canada	4	6	2	1	9	10	8	9	73
6	Italy	7	8	4	6	10	9	9	8	69
6	Italy	3	2	1	2	10	9	9	8	69

=== Men ===
Rank	Name	Nation	Total points	SP		Team points	FS		Team points
1	Nathan Chen	United States	301.44	1	101.95	12	1	199.49	12
2	Vincent Zhou	United States	299.01	2	100.51	11	2	198.50	11
3	Shoma Uno	Japan	282.24	3	92.78	10	3	189.46	10
4	Matteo Rizzo	Italy	260.53	6	87.64	7	5	172.89	8
5	Keiji Tanaka	Japan	258.84	4	89.05	9	6	169.79	7
6	Keegan Messing	Canada	257.79	9	79.75	4	4	178.04	9
7	Nam Nguyen	Canada	251.97	7	87.57	6	7	164.40	6
8	Andrei Lazukin	Russia	249.33	5	88.96	8	8	160.37	5
9	Kévin Aymoz	France	239.05	8	85.22	5	10	153.83	3
10	Alexander Samarin	Russia	230.37	12	71.84	1	9	158.53	4
11	Daniel Grassl	Italy	228.36	10	79.68	3	11	148.68	2
12	Adam Siao Him Fa	France	204.67	11	72.56	2	12	132.11	1

=== Ladies ===
Rank	Name	Nation	Total points	SP		Team points	FS		Team points
1	Elizaveta Tuktamysheva	Russia	234.43	2	80.54	11	1	153.89	12
2	Bradie Tennell	United States	225.64	4	74.81	9	2	150.83	11
3	Kaori Sakamoto	Japan	223.65	3	76.95	10	3	146.70	10
4	Rika Kihira	Japan	222.34	1	83.97	12	5	138.37	8
5	Sofia Samodurova	Russia	207.45	6	68.61	7	4	138.84	9
6	Mariah Bell	United States	206.06	5	70.89	8	6	135.17	7
7	Marina Piredda	Italy	180.55	9	60.33	4	7	120.22	6
8	Maé-Bérénice Méité	France	173.67	10	59.45	3	8	114.22	5
9	Gabrielle Daleman	Canada	171.81	7	64.33	6	10	107.48	3
10	Laurine Lecavelier	France	170.24	8	62.53	5	9	107.71	4
11	Roberta Rodeghiero	Italy	155.09	12	48.45	1	11	106.64	2
12	Alaine Chartrand	Canada	147.27	11	52.36	2	12	94.91	1

=== Pairs ===
Rank	Name	Nation	Total points	SP		Team points	FS		Team points
1	Vanessa James / Morgan Ciprès	France	226.00	2	73.48	11	1	152.52	12
2	Natalia Zabiiako / Alexander Enbert	Russia	217.12	1	75.80	12	2	141.32	11
3	Nicole Della Monica / Matteo Guarise	Italy	200.62	3	69.77	10	4	130.85	9
4	Kirsten Moore-Towers / Michael Marinaro	Canada	200.22	4	68.38	9	3	131.84	10
5	Ashley Cain / Timothy LeDuc	United States	192.15	5	66.91	8	5	125.24	8
6	Riku Miura / Shoya Ichihashi	Japan	137.91	6	44.93	7	6	92.98	7

=== Ice dancing ===
Rank	Name	Nation	Total points	RD		Team points	FD		Team points
1	Gabriella Papadakis / Guillaume Cizeron	France	223.13	1	87.31	12	1	135.82	12
2	Victoria Sinitsina / Nikita Katsalapov	Russia	215.20	2	84.57	11	2	130.63	11
3	Madison Hubbell / Zachary Donohue	United States	209.97	3	82.86	10	3	127.11	10
4	Kaitlyn Weaver / Andrew Poje	Canada	203.78	5	79.60	8	4	124.18	9
5	Charlène Guignard / Marco Fabbri	Italy	202.54	4	80.25	9	5	122.29	8
6	Misato Komatsubara / Tim Koleto	Japan	160.24	6	60.93	7	6	99.31	7

== Medalists ==
Discipline	Gold	Silver	Bronze
Team	United States; Nathan Chen; Vincent Zhou; Mariah Bell; Bradie Tennell; Ashley Cain / Timothy LeDuc; Madison Hubbell / Zachary Donohue	Japan; Keiji Tanaka; Shoma Uno; Rika Kihira; Kaori Sakamoto; Riku Miura / Shoya Ichihashi; Misato Komatsubara / Tim Koleto	Russia; Andrei Lazukin; Alexander Samarin; Sofia Samodurova; Elizaveta Tuktamysheva; Natalia Zabiiako / Alexander Enbert; Victoria Sinitsina / Nikita Katsalapov
