= Natalia Zabiiako =

Russian-Estonian figure skater (born 1994)

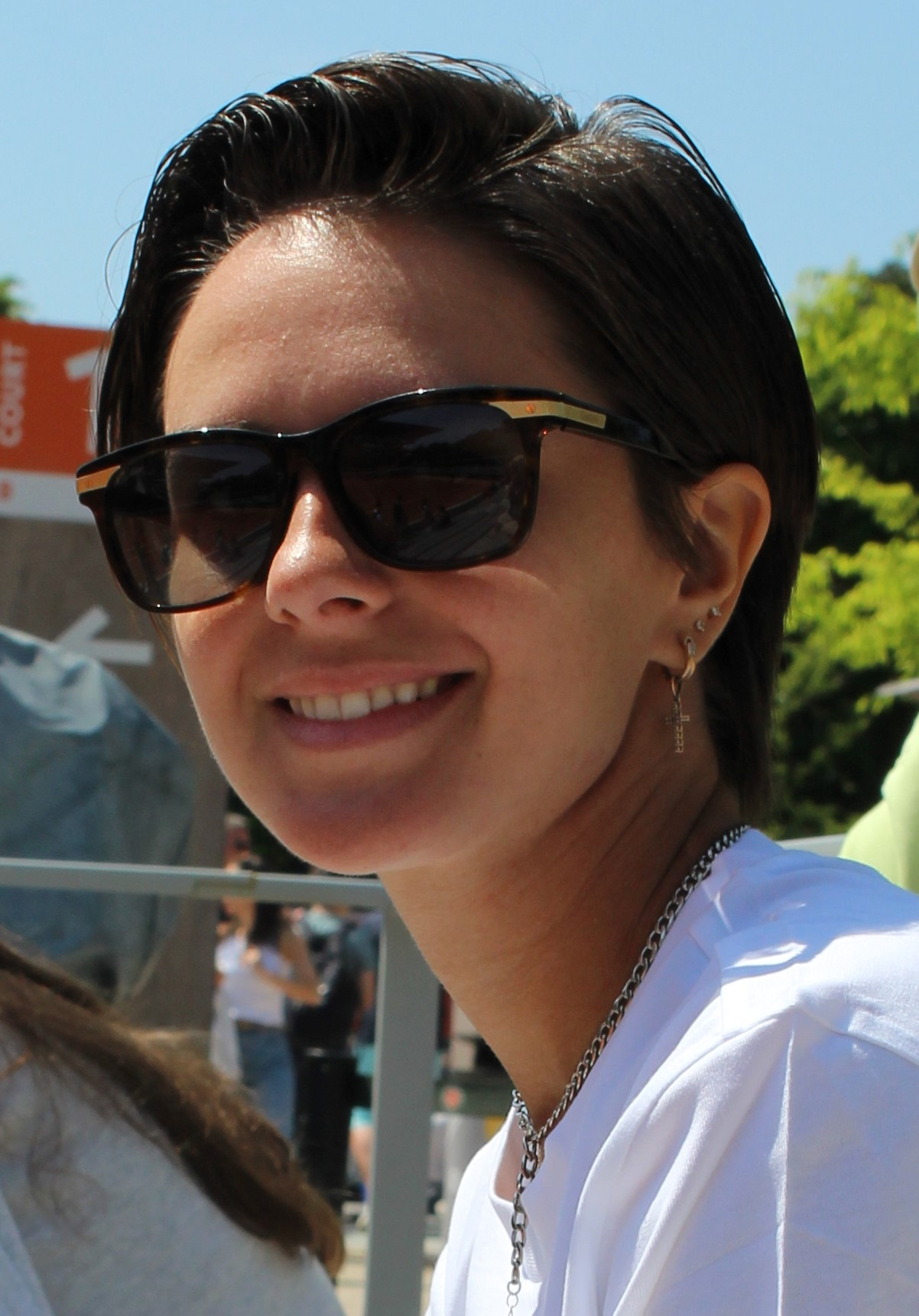
- Zabiiako in 2023

Personal information
- Full name: Natalia Aleksandrovna Zabiiako
- Other names: Natalja Zabijako; Natalya Zabiyako
- Born: 15 August 1994 (age 32) Tallinn, Estonia
- Height: 1.64 m (5 ft 5 in)

Figure skating career
- Country: Russia
- Coach: Nina Mozer, Vladislav Zhovnirski
- Skating club: Vorobievie Gory
- Began skating: 1998
Medal record
Figure skating: Pairs
Representing Olympic Athletes from Russia
Olympic Games
Silver medal – second place	2018 Pyeongchang	Team
Representing Russia
World Championships
Bronze medal – third place	2019 Saitama	Pairs
World Team Trophy
Bronze medal – third place	2019 Fukuoka	Team

Natalia Aleksandrovna Zabiiako (Russian: Наталья Александровна Забияко, born 15 August 1994) is a Russian-Estonian competitive pair skater. Competing for Russia with Alexander Enbert, she was the 2019 World bronze medalist, 2018 Winter Olympics team figure skating silver medalist, 2018 European bronze medalist, 2018 Grand Prix of Helsinki champion, 2018 NHK Trophy champion, 2016 Rostelecom Cup silver medalist, and three-time Russian national medalist.

Zabiiako competed for Estonia until 2014, partnered with Sergei Muhhin, Sergei Kulbach, and Alexandr Zaboev. With Zaboev, she placed tenth at the 2014 European Championships. Although they qualified a spot for Estonia in the pairs' event at the 2014 Winter Olympics, they did not compete in Sochi because Zaboev's fast-track citizenship application was declined.

== Personal life ==
Zabiiako was born in Tallinn, Estonia. Her mother is an Estonian citizen, and her father holds an Estonian alien's passport.

From 2010 to 2014, Zabiiako lived in the United States with a Russian immigrant family. In April 2014, she said she planned to move to Moscow and apply for Russian citizenship. She became a Russian citizen on 19 December 2014.

She was briefly engaged to Russian film director, Danil Grinkin. In 2022, Zabiiako came out as a lesbian, revealing that she was in a relationship with Russian-Australian tennis player, Daria Kasatkina. In 2025, during an Instagram Q&A with fans, Zabiiako revealed that former American-Canadian ice dancer Kaitlyn Weaver was the only individual from the figure skating community to reach out and support her following her coming out. Zabiiako and Kasatkina announced their engagement in June 2025 and married in July 2026. The couple also started a YouTube vlog about life on the tennis circuit.

== Career for Estonia ==
Zabiiako began skating when she was four years old. At age 15, she switched from singles to pairs, partnering with Sergei Muhhin. They made their international debut at the 2009 ISU Junior Grand Prix in Belarus and placed sixteenth at the 2010 World Junior Championships.

=== Partnership with Kulbach ===
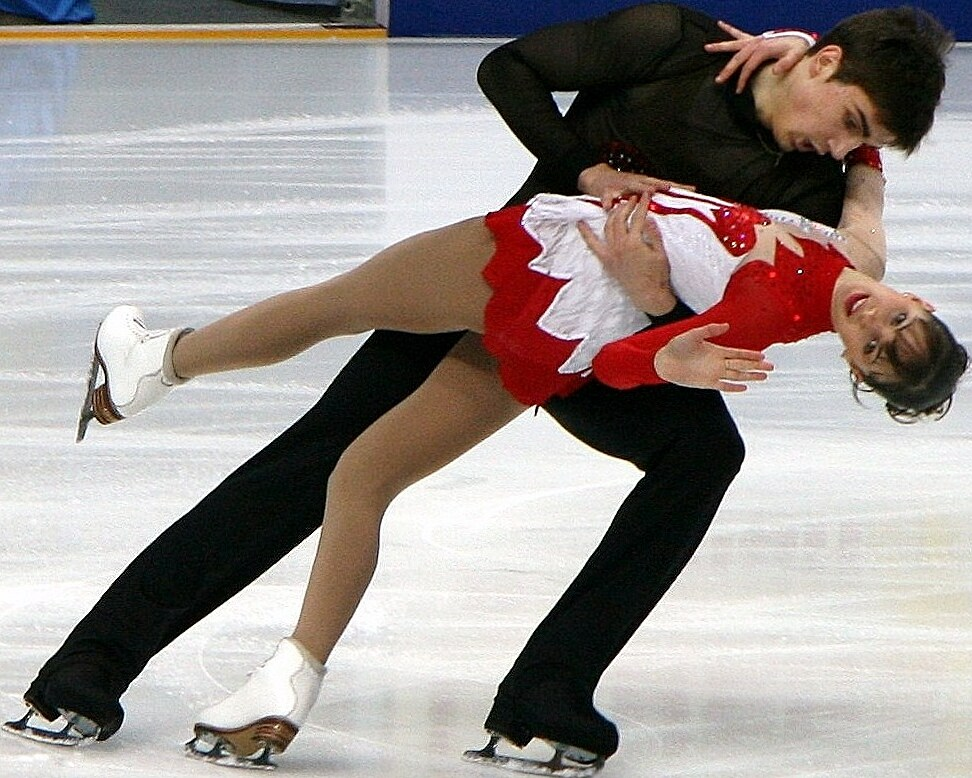
Zabiiako and Kulbach at the 2011 World Championships

Later in 2010, Zabiiako teamed up with Ukrainian skater Sergei Kulbach to represent Estonia. After debuting at the 2010 Nebelhorn Trophy, the pair placed thirteenth at the 2011 European Championships and sixteenth at the 2011 World Championships. Zabiiako injured her back as a result of a fall at the NRW Trophy in December 2011, preventing them from competing at the 2012 European Championships. On 15 February 2012, it was reported that Zabiiako and Kulbach had parted ways.

=== Partnership with Zaboev ===
In October 2012, Zabiiako teamed up with Russian-born skater Alexandr Zaboev to compete for Estonia. By finishing ninth at the 2013 Nebelhorn Trophy, they earned a spot for Estonia in pair skating at the 2014 Winter Olympics in Sochi. Zaboev applied for Estonian citizenship, required to represent the country at the Olympics, but in November 2013, Estonia denied his fast-track application. Zabiiako/Zaboev placed tenth at the 2014 European Championships and nineteenth at the 2014 World Championships. In late March 2014, Zabiiako ended their partnership, saying he was too difficult to work with and the Estonian Skating Federation did not provide them with equal financial support. In early April 2014, the Secretary General of the Estonian Skating Union submitted an official rebuttal to Zabiiako's statements. The Secretary General called Zabiiako's statements concerning the Skating Union and her partner slanderous and untrue; "Sport - is voluntary, and each person has a right to make decisions, but to justify their actions do not have to lie and defame their partners."

== Career for Russia ==
In April 2014, Zabiiako said she would move to Moscow to work with Nina Mozer and try out with different skaters, intending to compete for Russia. ISU rules require skaters to sit out a certain period of time after a country change.

In Summer 2014, Zabiiako and Yuri Larionov decided to skate together. In June 2015, she said that their partnership had ended.

=== 2015–16 season: Beginning of partnership with Enbert ===
In July 2015, the Russian media reported that Zabiiako had teamed up with Alexander Enbert and that she had been released to represent Russia internationally.

Zabiiako/Enbert's international debut came in October 2015 at the 2015 Mordovian Ornament, a Challenger Series (CS) event at which they won a silver medal. In November, the pair appeared for the first time on the Grand Prix series, placing fifth at the 2015 Rostelecom Cup. In early December, they finished fourth at the 2015 CS Golden Spin of Zagreb and third in the CS standings. At the 2016 Russian Championships, the pair placed fifth in both segments and overall.

=== 2016–17 season ===
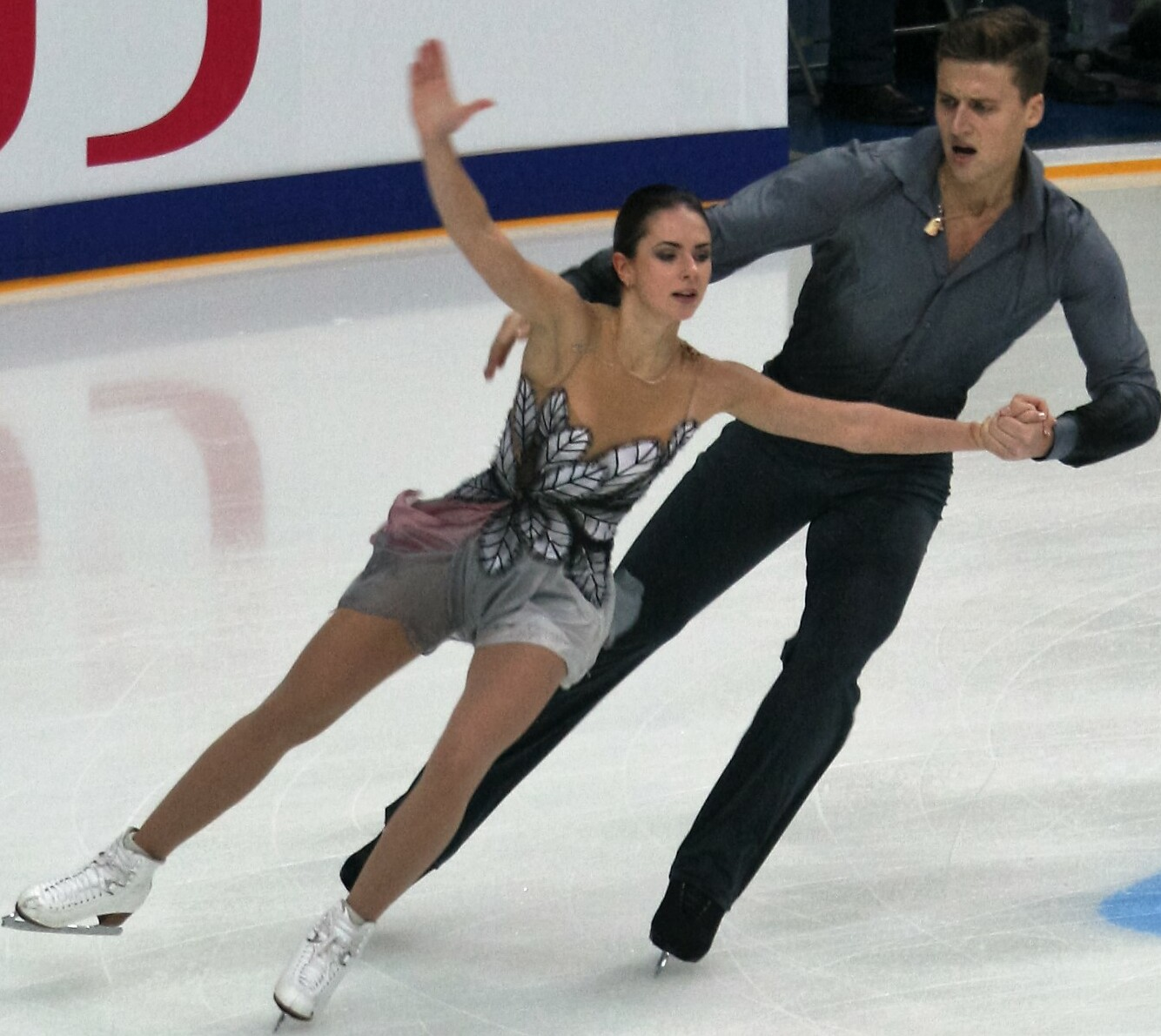
Zabiiako and Enbert at the 2016 Rostelecom Cup

Zabiiako/Enbert started the 2016–17 season on the Challenger Series, obtaining the bronze medal at the 2016 CS Ondrej Nepela Memorial. Turning to the Grand Prix series, the pair won the silver medal at the 2016 Rostelecom Cup, having placed first in the short and second in the free behind Germany's Aliona Savchenko / Bruno Massot. They then placed fourth at the 2016 Trophée de France. These results didn't qualify them to the 2016–17 Grand Prix Final but they were the 1st alternates and were called up after Aliona Savchenko / Bruno Massot withdrew. Zabiiako/Enbert placed fourth at the 2016–17 Grand Prix Final after placing fifth in both the short program and the free skate.

In December 2016, Zabiiako/Enbert won the bronze medal at the 2017 Russian Championships after placing third in both the short program and the free skate. In January 2017 they competed at the 2017 European Championships where finished fifth after placing fifth in both the short program and the free skate. In March 2017 Zabiiako/Enbert finished twelfth at the 2017 World Championships.

=== 2017–18 season ===
Zabiiako/Enbert began their season on the Challenger Series, winning a gold medal at both the 2017 CS Lombardia Trophy and 2017 CS Ondrej Nepela Trophy.

In their first Grand Prix event of the season, Zabiiako/Enbert placed fourth at 2017 Skate Canada after placing fourth in both the short program and free skate. In their second Grand Prix event at 2017 Skate America, Zabiiako/Enbert placed fourth after ranking fourth in the short program and fifth in the free skate. The pair did not qualify for the 2017-18 Grand Prix Final.

In December 2017, Zabiiako/Enbert won their 3rd 2017–18 Challenger Series gold medal when they won the 2017 CS Golden Spin of Zagreb. A few weeks later they placed third at the 2018 Russian Championships, earning places on the Russian national team for the 2018 Winter Olympics.

In January 2018, they won the bronze medal at the 2018 European Championships after placing second in the short program and third in the free skate.

At the Winter Olympics in Pyeongchang, South Korea, Zabiiako/Enbert placed third in the free skate portion of the team event, earning a silver medal as part of the Russian team. They then placed seventh at the pairs event with a personal best score of 212.88 points.

In March 2018, Zabiiako/Enbert finished fourth at the 2018 World Championships after placing fourth in the short program and sixth in the free skate.

=== 2018–19 season ===
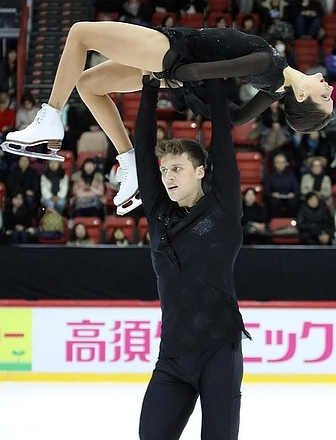
Zabiiako and Enbert at the 2018 Grand Prix of Helsinki

Zabiiako/Enbert started their season in mid September at the 2018 CS Lombardia Trophy where they won the gold medal ahead of their teammates Aleksandra Boikova / Dmitrii Kozlovskii.

In early November, Zabiiako/Enbert won their first Grand Prix gold medal at the 2018 Grand Prix of Helsinki. They ranked second in the short program and first in the free skate and beat the silver medalists, Nicole Della Monica / Matteo Guarise, by about 13 points. Zabiiako described their first Grand Prix victory as "a good experience for us." Only one week later, Zabiiako/Enbert won their second Grand Prix gold medal at the 2018 NHK Trophy with a personal best score of 214.14 points. They ranked first in both programs and beat the silver medalist, Peng Cheng / Jin Yang, by about 7 points.

With two Grand Prix gold medals, they qualified for the 2018–19 Grand Prix Final. In second after the short program, an underrotated side-by-side jump from Zabiiako followed by an aborted lift toward the end of their program dropped them to fourth in the free skate and fourth overall. Zabiiako remarked that "probably some parts of our program were not quite ready yet, but we will improve them." At the 2019 Russian Championships, Zabiiako/Enbert won the silver medal, placing second in both the short and free programs. Enbert said "we’re pleased with what we showed in the free skating. We fixed some issues from the Final and skated at a higher level here in Saransk."

Zabiiako/Enbert were named to Russia's team for the 2019 European Championships, but withdrew on December 27, 2018 due to medical issues. They were replaced by Daria Pavliuchenko / Denis Khodykin.

One week prior to the 2019 World Championships, the skaters were declared fit to compete, and they won their first World medal—a bronze. They concluded their season at the 2019 World Team Trophy as part of Team Russia, where they won the bronze medal.

=== Retirement ===
Zabiiako/Enbert did not compete during the 2019–20 figure skating season due to Enbert's illness. On February 26, 2020, it was announced that while Enbert was healthy again, they would not be returning to competition. In the same year, a documentary film "Unbroken" was released about two pair skating teams Cain-Gribble / LeDuc (USA) and Zabiiako / Enbert (Russia).

=== Attempt to resume a career in Canada ===
On May 18, 2022, it was announced that Zabiiako "is resuming her career and will compete for Canada" with Zachary Daleman as her partner under the guidance of a coach Bruno Marcotte. On July 20, 2022, it was announced that Zabiiako no longer trains in Canada and the offer of the Canadian Figure Skating Federation was withdrawn.

== Programs ==
=== With Enbert ===
Season	Short program	Free skating	Exhibition
2019–2020	The Fire Within by Jennifer Thomas and the Rogue Pianist		
2018–2019	Alexander Nevsky by Sergei Prokofiev choreo. by Peter Tchernyshev	Toi et Moi by Igor Krutoi choreo. by Pasquale Camerlengo	Tango in Ebony by Maksim Mrvica
2017–2018	Summer of '42 by Michel Legrand choreo. by Igor Tchiniaev	The Sleeping Beauty by Pyotr Ilyich Tchaikovsky choreo. by Giuseppe Arena	Can't Help Falling in Love by Hugo Peretti, Luigi Creatore, George David Weiss covered by Chris Isaak
2016–2017	The Blizzard by Georgy Sviridov	Cry Me a River by Michael Bublé	Juno and Avos by Alexey Rybnikov; Une Vie d'Amour performed by Valery Leontiev
2015–2016	Juno and Avos by Alexey Rybnikov	God's Thunder by Georges Garvarentz	Juno and Avos by Alexey Rybnikov

=== With Larionov ===
Season	Short program	Free skating	Exhibition
2014–15	The Phantom of the Opera by Andrew Lloyd Webber	Requiem pour un Fou by Lara Fabian	Belle from Notre-Dame de Paris by Riccardo Cocciante

=== With Zaboev ===
Season	Short program	Free skating
2013–14	Russian folk music	Conquest of Paradise by Vangelis

=== With Kulbach ===
Season	Short program	Free skating
2011–12	Russian folk music	Conquest of Paradise by Vangelis
2010–11	Middle Eastern composition	Tribute Nostalgia; Until the Last Moment by Yanni

=== With Muhhin ===
Season	Short program	Free skating
2009–10	Charlie Chaplin	Dark Eyes

== Competitive highlights ==
GP: Grand Prix; CS: Challenger Series; JGP: Junior Grand Prix

=== With Enbert for Russia ===
International
Event	15–16	16–17	17–18	18–19
Olympics			7th	
Worlds		12th	4th	3rd
Europeans		5th	3rd	
GP Final		4th		4th
GP Finland				1st
GP France		4th		
GP NHK Trophy				1st
GP Rostelecom	5th	2nd		
GP Skate America			4th	
GP Skate Canada			4th	
CS Golden Spin	4th		1st	
CS Lombardia			1st	1st
CS Mordovian	2nd			
CS Nepela Trophy		3rd	1st	
National
Russian Champ.	5th	3rd	3rd	2nd
Team events
Olympics			2nd T	
World Team Trophy				3rd T 2nd P

=== With Larionov for Russia ===
National
Event	2014–15
Russian Championships	7th

=== With Zaboev for Estonia ===
International
Event	2013–14
World Championships	19th
European Championships	10th
Golden Spin of Zagreb	2nd
Nebelhorn Trophy	9th

=== With Kulbach for Estonia ===
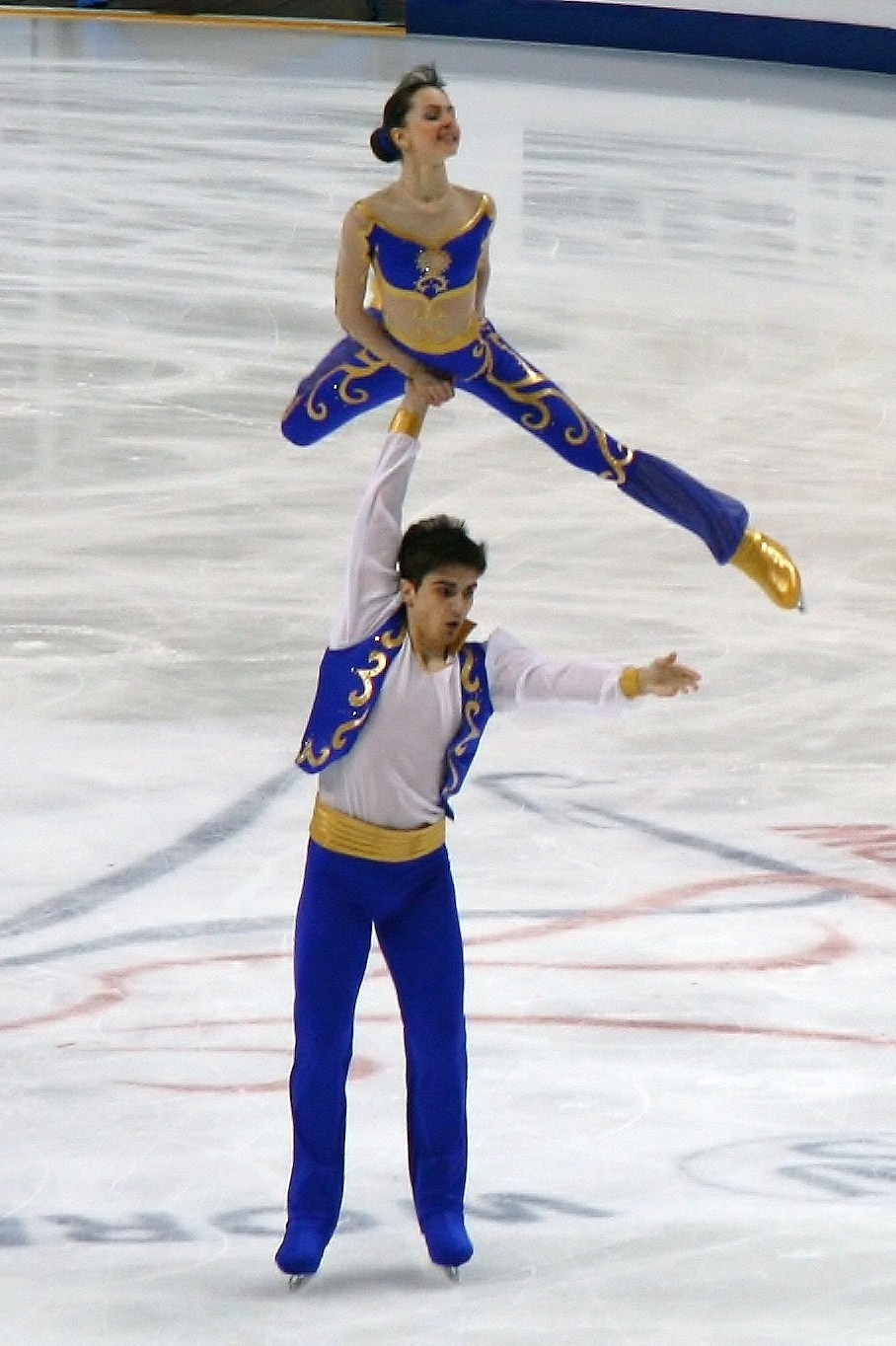
Zabiiako competes with Sergei Kulbach at the 2011 World Championships

International
Event	2010–11	2011–12
World Champ.	16th	
European Champ.	13th	
NRW Trophy	5th	3rd
International: Junior
JGP Estonia		4th
National
Estonian Champ.	1st	

=== With Muhhin for Estonia ===
International
Event	2009–10
World Junior Champ.	16th
JGP Belarus	13th
National
Estonian Championships	1st

== Detailed results ==
Small medals for short and free programs awarded only at ISU Championships. At team events, medals awarded for team results only.

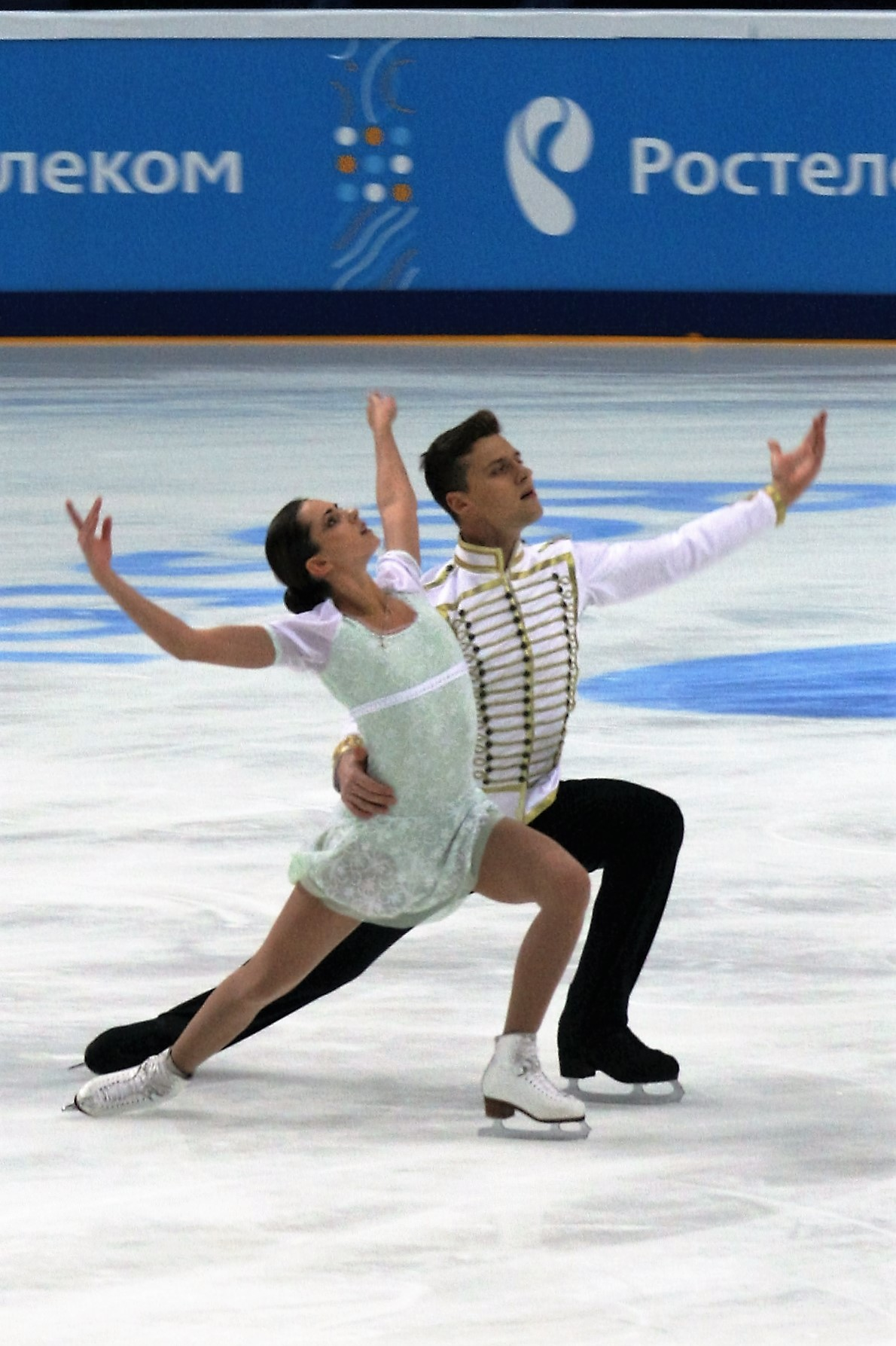
Zabiiako and Enbert at the 2016 Rostelecom Cup

With Enbert

2018–19 season
Date	Event	SP	FS	Total
11–14 April 2019	2019 World Team Trophy	1; 75.80	2; 141.32	3T/2P; 217.12
18–24 March 2019	2019 World Championships	4; 73.96	4; 144.02	3; 217.98
19–23 December 2018	2019 Russian Championships	2; 78.53	2; 151.96	2; 230.49
6–9 December 2018	2018–19 Grand Prix Final	2; 75.18	4; 125.89	4; 201.07
9–11 November 2018	2018 NHK Trophy	1; 73.48	1; 140.66	1; 214.14
2–4 November 2018	2018 Grand Prix of Helsinki	2; 67.59	1; 130.92	1; 198.51
12–16 September 2018	2018 CS Lombardia Trophy	1; 72.50	2; 123.65	1; 196.15
2017–18 season
Date	Event	SP	FS	Total
19–25 March 2018	2018 World Championships	4; 74.38	6; 133.50	4; 207.88
14–25 February 2018	2018 Winter Olympics	8; 74.35	7; 138.53	7; 212.88
9–12 February 2018	2018 Winter Olympics (Team event)		3; 133.28	2
15–21 January 2018	2018 European Championships	2; 72.95	3; 137.23	3; 210.18
21–24 December 2017	2018 Russian Championships	3; 75.00	3; 132.51	3; 207.51
6–9 December 2017	2017 CS Golden Spin of Zagreb	1; 68.76	1; 134.20	1; 202.96
24–26 November 2017	2017 Skate America	4; 70.15	5; 127.74	4; 197.89
27–29 October 2017	2017 Skate Canada	4; 69.00	4; 123.70	4; 192.70
21–23 September 2017	2017 CS Ondrej Nepela Trophy	2; 64.52	1; 128.06	1; 192.58
14–17 September 2017	2017 CS Lombardia Trophy	1; 69.22	1; 126.84	1; 196.06
2016–17 season
Date	Event	SP	FS	Total
29 March – 2 April 2017	2017 World Championships	5; 74.26	13; 118.28	12; 192.54
25–29 January 2017	2017 European Championships	5; 72.38	5; 128.37	5; 200.75
20–26 December 2016	2017 Russian Championships	3; 72.85	3; 129.06	3; 201.91
8–11 December 2016	2016–17 Grand Prix Final	5; 65.79	5; 122.53	4; 188.32
11–13 November 2016	2016 Trophée de France	3; 71.36	4; 121.20	4; 192.56
4–6 November 2016	2016 Rostelecom Cup	1; 69.76	2; 128.01	2; 197.77
30 September – 2 October 2016	2016 CS Ondrej Nepela Memorial	3; 67.04	3; 114.34	3; 181.38
2015–16 season
Date	Event	SP	FS	Total
23–27 December 2015	2016 Russian Championships	5; 70.60	5; 134.43	5; 205.03
2–5 December 2015	2015 CS Golden Spin of Zagreb	4; 60.96	4; 112.66	4; 173.62
20–22 November 2015	2015 Rostelecom Cup	5; 60.77	5; 119.79	5; 180.56
15–18 October 2015	2015 CS Mordovian Ornament	2; 67.64	2; 128.58	2; 196.22
