= 13th Hollywood Music in Media Awards =

US film music awards ceremony in 2022

- Date: November 16, 2022
- Location: The Avalon, Hollywood
- Most wins: Guillermo del Toro's Pinocchio (2)
- Most nominations: Black Panther: Wakanda Forever, Bros, Everything Everywhere All at Once, Guillermo del Toro's Pinocchio, and Yellowjackets (3)
- Website: www.hmmawards.com

The 13th Hollywood Music in Media Awards recognized the best in music in film, TV, video games, commercials, and trailers of 2022. The ceremony was held on November 16, 2022, at The Avalon in Hollywood, becoming the first in-person ceremony in two years after the virtual ceremonies of 2020 and 2021.

The nominations were announced on November 3, 2022; new categories for songs and scores for trailers and streaming media were introduced.

Composer Kurt Farquhar received the Career Achievement Award.

== Winners and nominees ==
=== Career Achievement Award ===
- Kurt Farquhar

=== Score ===
Original Score – Feature Film	Original Score – Independent Film
The Woman King – Terence Blanchard; Emancipation – Marcelo Zarvos; Empire of Light – Trent Reznor and Atticus Ross; She Said – Nicholas Britell; The Banshees of Inisherin – Carter Burwell; Till – Abel Korzeniowski; Where the Crawdads Sing – Mychael Danna; White Noise – Danny Elfman; Women Talking – Hildur Guðnadóttir	Living – Emilie Levienaise-Farrouch; Dead for a Dollar – Xander Rodzinski; Don't Make Me Go – Jessica Weiss; Everything Everywhere All at Once – Son Lux; The Outfit – Alexandre Desplat; The Whale – Rob Simonsen
Original Score – Animated Film	Original Score – Sci-Fi Film
Guillermo del Toro's Pinocchio – Alexandre Desplat; DC League of Super-Pets – Steve Jablonsky; Luck – John Debney; Puss in Boots: The Last Wish – Heitor Pereira; The Bad Guys – Daniel Pemberton; Turning Red – FINNEAS and Ludwig Göransson	Doctor Strange in the Multiverse of Madness – Danny Elfman; Black Adam – Lorne Balfe; Black Panther: Wakanda Forever – Ludwig Göransson; Spider-Man: No Way Home – Michael Giacchino; The Batman – Michael Giacchino; Thor: Love and Thunder – Michael Giacchino
Original Score – Fantasy Film	Original Score – Horror Film
Avatar: The Way of Water – Simon Franglen; Three Thousand Years of Longing – Tom Holkenborg; Fantastic Beasts: The Secrets of Dumbledore – James Newton Howard; Wendell & Wild – Bruno Coulais; The King's Daughter – Joseph Metcalfe, John Coda, and Grant Kirkhope	Nope – Michael Abels; Barbarian – Anna Drubich; Halloween Ends – John Carpenter, Cody Carpenter, and Daniel Davies; Scream: Legacy – Lance Treviño; The Black Phone – Mark Korven; The Menu – Colin Stetson
Original Score – Documentary	Original Score – Independent Film (Foreign Language)
The Tinder Swindler – Jessica Jones; Black Ice – Simon Poole; Descendant – Ray Angry, Rhiannon Giddens, and Dirk Powell; Gratitude Revealed – Lisbeth Scott; Landis: Just Watch Me – Emilie and Peter Bernstein; Turn Every Page: The Adventures of Robert Caro and Robert Gottlieb – Clare Manchon and Olivier Manchon	Cuando sea Joven – Carlo Siliotto; EO – Paweł Mykietyn; Railway Heroes – Min He; RRR – M. M. Keeravani; War Sailor – Volker Bertelmann
Original Score – TV Show/Limited Series	Original Score – TV Show/Limited Series (Foreign Language)
1883 – Brian Tyler and Breton Vivian; The Man Who Fell to Earth – Jeff Russo; Yellowjackets – Craig Wedren and Anna Waronker; Ice Age: Scrat Tales – Batu Sener; The Lord of the Rings: The Rings of Power – Bear McCreary; Severance – Theodore Shapiro; Obi-Wan Kenobi – Natalie Holt and John Williams	Das Boot – Matthias Weber; Thai Cave Rescue – Austin Wintory and Susie Seiter; Drifted by Water – Ibrahim Shamel; Pagan Peak – Jacob Shea; Armas de Mujer – Juan Carlos Enriquez
Original Score – Short Film (Live Action)	Original Score – Short Film (Animated)
The Modern Man – Benjamin Beladi, Benjamin Botkin, and Carl Vaudrin; Everybody Dies...Sometimes – Carla Patullo; Inés Unfortunately – María Eugenia León; Remembering – Sunna Wehrmeijer; The Ringmaster – Emer Kinsella	She Dreams at Sunrise – Stefan L. Smith; Animal Attraction – Stephanie Economou; Honor of Kings – TiMi Audio Lab; Kiriko – Adam Burgess and Justin Welgraven; The Legend of Pipi – Bryan Teoh
Original Score – Short Film (Documentary)	Original Score – Streamed Live Action Film (No Theatrical Release)
Mink! – Katya Richardson; Bad Child – J.M. Quintana Cámara; Barefoot Empress – Raashi Kulkarni; Betsy & Irv – Inza Bamba; The Elephant Whisperers – Sven Faulconer	Prey – Sarah Schachner; Hocus Pocus 2 – John Debney; Pinocchio – Alan Silvestri; Prancer: A Christmas Tale – Mark McKenzie; Rise – Ré Olunuga; Weird: The Al Yankovic Story – Leo Birenberg and Zach Robinson
Original Score – Streamed Animated Film (No Theatrical Release)	Original Score – Documentary Series – TV/Digital
Beavis and Butt-Head Do the Universe – John Frizzell; Chip 'n Dale: Rescue Rangers – Brian Tyler; The Boys Presents: Diabolical: "Laser Baby's Day Out" – Steven Bernstein and Julie Bernstein; The House – Gustavo Santaolalla; Tom and Jerry: Cowboy Up! – Vivek Maddala	Prehistoric Planet – Anze Rozman, Kara Talve, and Hans Zimmer; Dear... – Craig Richey; Eat the Rich: The Gamestop Saga – Michael Lee; Great Lakes Untamed – Erica Procunier; Mind Over Murder – Chad Cannon; Neymar: The Perfect Chaos – Tejo Damasceno; Our Great National Parks – David Schweitzer
Original Score – Video Game	Original Score – Mobile Video Game
CHORUS – Pedro Macedo Camacho; Arma Reforger – Dominik Svoboda; Assassin's Creed Valhalla: Dawn of Ragnarök – Stephanie Economou; Blind Fate: Edo No Yami – Joe Kataldo; God of War Ragnarök – Bear McCreary; Horizon Forbidden West – Joris de Man, Niels van der Leest, Oleksa Lozowchuk, and The Flight; In Nightmare – Min He; Mario + Rabbids Sparks of Hope – Grant Kirkhope, Yoko Shimomura, and Gareth Coker; Moss: Book II – Jason Graves; Potionomics – Greg Nicolett	Return to Empire – Chris Wirtz, Matthias Wolf, Armin Haas, and TiMi Audio Lab; Heroes of Incredible Tales 2 – Jeff Broadbent; Honor of Kings – Alexandre Desplat; Infinite Lagrange – Jason Huang; PUBG Mobile – Garrett Williamson, Inon Zur, Neal Acree, Mason Lieberman, Hexany Studio, and Lightspeed Studios Audio

=== Song ===
Original Song – Feature Film	Original Song – Independent Film
"Lift Me Up" from Black Panther: Wakanda Forever – Written by Tems, Rihanna, Ryan Coogler, and Ludwig Göransson; Performed by Rihanna; "(You Made It Feel Like) Home" from Bones and All – Written by Trent Reznor and Atticus Ross; Performed by Trent Reznor, Atticus Ross, and Mariqueen Maandig Reznor; "Love Is Not Love" from Bros – Written by Billy Eichner and Marc Shaiman; Performed by Billy Eichner; "Do a Little Good" from Spirited – Written by Benj Pasek and Justin Paul; Performed by Ryan Reynolds, Will Ferrell, Sunita Mani, Patrick Page, and Tracy Morgan; "Stand Up" from Till – Written by Jazmine Sullivan and D'Mile; Performed by Jazmine Sullivan; "Hold My Hand" from Top Gun: Maverick – Written by Lady Gaga and BloodPop; Performed by Lady Gaga; "Carolina" from Where the Crawdads Sing – Written and performed by Taylor Swift; "New Body Rhumba" from White Noise – Written by James Murphy, Nancy Whang, and Patrick Mahoney; Performed by LCD Soundsystem; "Song Chord" from Avatar: The Way of Water – Written by Simon Franglen; Performed by Zoe Saldaña; "Time" from Amsterdam – Written by Aubrey Drake Graham, Daniel Pemberton, Giveon Evans, and Jahaan Akil Sweet; Performed by Giveon	"Applause" from Tell It Like a Woman – Written by Diane Warren; Performed by Sofia Carson; "Til You're Home" from A Man Called Otto – Written by David Hodges and Rita Wilson; Performed by Rita Wilson and Sebastián Yatra; "This Is a Life" from Everything Everywhere All at Once – Written by Ryan Lott, David Byrne, and Mitski; Performed By Son Lux with Mitski and David Byrne; "We Two Made One" from The Silent Twins – Written by Marcin Macuk, Zuzanna Wrońska, June Gibbons, and Jennifer Gibbons; Performed by Tamara Lawrance; "Stand the Test of Time" from Tomorrow's Game – Written and performed by Lionel Cohen and Stefni Valencia
Original Song – Animated Film	Original Song – Documentary
"Ciao Papa" from Guillermo del Toro's Pinocchio – Written by Alexandre Desplat; Lyrics by Roeben Katz and Guillermo del Toro; Performed by Gregory Mann; "Sunny Side Up Summer" from The Bob's Burgers Movie – Written by Loren Bouchard and Nora Smith; Performed by Dan Mintz, Eugene Mirman, H. Jon Benjamin, John Roberts, and Kristen Schaal; "Nobody Like U" from Turning Red – Written by Billie Eilish and Finneas O'Connell; Performed by 4*TOWN (Finneas O'Connell, Grayson Villanueva, Jordan Fisher, Josh Levi, and Topher Ngo); "Lift Your Wings" from My Father's Dragon – Written by Mychael Danna, Jeff Danna, Frank Danna, Nora Twomey, and Meg LeFauve; Performed by Anohni; "Turn Up the Sunshine" from Minions: The Rise of Gru – Written by Jack Antonoff, Kevin Parker, Sam Dew, and Patrik Berger; Performed by Diana Ross and Tame Impala	"Ready As I'll Never Be" from The Return of Tanya Tucker: Featuring Brandi Carlile – Written by Brandi Carlile and Tanya Tucker; Performed by Tanya Tucker; "My Mind and Me" from Selena Gomez: My Mind & Me – Written by Selena Gomez, Amy Allen, Jonathan Bellion, Michael Pollack, Stefan Johnson, and Jordan K Johnson; Performed by Selena Gomez; "At the Automat" from The Automat – Written and performed by Mel Brooks; "Sing a Brand New Song" from Killing Me Softly with His Songs – Written by Charles Fox and Lonnie "Common" Rashid Lynn; Performed by Donald Webber Jr.; "Dust and Ash" from The Voice of Dust and Ash – Written by J. Ralph; Performed by Norah Jones; "We Are Art" from We Are Art Through the Eyes of Annalaura – Written by Annalaura di Luggo and Paky Di Maio; Performed by Annalaura di Luggo; "A Sky Like I've Never Seen" from Wildcat – Written by Robin Pecknold; Performed by Fleet Foxes
Original Song – TV Show/Limited Series	Original Song – Streamed Film (No Theatrical Release)
"Maybe Monica" from The Marvelous Mrs. Maisel – Written by Thomas Mizer and Curtis Moore; Performed by Josh A. Dawson; "Strange Game" from Slow Horses – Written by Mick Jagger and Daniel Pemberton; Performed by Mick Jagger; "Two Shots" from The Afterparty – Written by Jack Dolgen and Jon Lajoie; Performed by Ben Schwartz; "If I Should Die Tonight" from Godfather of Harlem – Written by Ralph Johnson and Douglas Gibbs; Performed by Ronald Isley; "Right Place" from High School Musical: The Musical: The Series – Written by William Behlendorf, Jason Mater, and Brandon C. Rogers; Performed by Adrian Lyles	"Now You Know" from Weird: The Al Yankovic Story – Written and performed by "Weird Al" Yankovic; "47 & 1" from Blade of the 47 Ronin – Written and produced by Armande Milhouse; Performed by BLVCKNEON; "I Will Always Dance" from Pinocchio – Written by Alan Silvestri, and Glen Ballard; Performed by Kyanne Lamaya; "No One Gets Left Behind" from Better Nate Than Ever – Written by Lyndie Lane; Performed by Rueby Wood; "They are the Munsters" from The Munsters – Written by Rob Zombie and Zeuss; Performed by Rob Zombie
Original Song – Video Game	Original Song – Short Film
"Blood Upon the Snow" from God of War Ragnarök – Written and performed by Hozier and Bear McCreary; "Chorus Main Theme" from CHORUS – Written by Pedro Macedo Camacho; Performed by Úyanga Bold; "Vroom" from Gran Turismo 7 – Written and performed by The FaNaTiX, Idris Elba, Lil Tjay, Davido, Koffee, and Moelogo; "Rebirth" from League of Legends – Written by EJAE and Matthew Carl Earl; Performed by EJAE; "Clarity" from Quantaar – Written by Cody Matthew Johnson, dorsia, Matilda Stray, and Alec Justice; Performed by Matthew Cody Johnson and dorsia	"Call Me By Any Name" from Better at Texting – Written and performed by Alexandra Petkovski
Original Song/Score – Commercial Advertisement	Original Song/Score – New Media
Ausfilm: The Australian Job – Angela Little; "Support Is Everything" (Adidas Women) – Alexandra Petkovski and Angela Sheik; "Revital" (Shiseido) – Cecil Abhishek and Ritz Hiraga (featuring Annie the Clumsy); "Love Letter" (For All Time) – Jason Huang; Disney Channel Europe – Mariano Saulino	The Timelapse Project "Origins" – Jeremy Nathan Tisser and Ashley Tamar Davis; Cat Burglar – Christopher Willis; No Reason to Apologize: The Resilient Legacy of Viola Desmond – Janal Bechthold and La-Nai Gabriel; Prime Video "Thursday Night Football" – Pinar Toprak; Minions: The Rise of Gru Lyrical Lemonade – Yeat
Original Song/Score – Trailer	Original Song/Score – Trailer (Video Game)
"Take Me Back Home" from Frozen Planet II trailer – Composed by Camila Cabello and Hans Zimmer; Arranged by Anže Rozman; Produced by Russell Emanuel; "Colours of You" from Heartstopper trailer – Written by Arabella Latham and Edward James Carlile; Produced by King Ed; Performed by Baby Queen; Collision trailer – Music composed and orchestrated by Sacha Chaban; Performed by Budapest Scoring Orchestra; "Enlightenment of Universe" written by "Bafana Isaac Nhlapo"; Performed by Bafana Nhlapo and Ibou Cissokho; "Bushiri" and "Freedom Always Comes at a Price" written by Tshepo Koloti Moji; Performed by BLVD'96; Avatar: The Way of Water trailer – Written by Simon Franglen; Black Panther: Wakanda Forever trailer – "No Woman, No Cry" written by Bob Marley, performed by Tems; "Alright" written and performed by Kendrick Lamar	League of Legends: Wild Rift – Superhero Jayce trailer) – Original music composed by Jeff Broadbent; "A New Era" from Overwatch 2 trailer – Written by Adam Burgess, Mark Petrie, and Sam Cardon; Arma Reforger trailer – Original music composed by Dominik Svoboda; "Get Down" from Fortnite Chapter 3 Season 4 Battle Pass trailer – Written and performed by Alexandra Petkovski; Produced with Kris Kovacs; "QQSpeed song" from QQ Speed trailer – Written by Xiaonan Yan and Yuedong Dai; Performed by Jing
Original Song – TV Movie Streamed	Original Song – Documentary Series – TV
"Willing to Trust" from Entergalactic – Written by Scott Mescudi, Tyrone William Griffin Jr., Oladipo Omishore, Rami Eadeh, and Evan Mast	"So Afraid to Lose You" from The Andy Warhol Diaries – Written by Daniel Braun; Performed by Spinal Root Gang
Song – Onscreen Performance (Film)	Original Song – Mobile Video Game
"Love Is Not Love" from Bros – Billy Eichner; "Naatu Naatu" from RRR – Rahul Sipligunj and Kaala Bhairava; "Baby Let's Play House" from Elvis – Austin Butler; "Cucamonga" from Knights of Swing – Knights of Swing; "On My Way (Marry Me)" from Marry Me – Jennifer Lopez	"Beyond the Sky" from Eve Echoes – Written by Koshin, Kiana, and Ruth Kueo; Performed by Cece and The Dark Hearts; "Fairytale Love" from Game for Peace – Written by Weihao Xiao, Kin Lee, Yan Song, and Lightspeed Studios Audio; Performed by Yichun Shan and Budapest Scoring Symphony Orchestra; "Wands Up!" from Harry Potter: Magic Awakened – Written by Tino and Elena Westermann; Performed by 2WEI and Elena Westermann; "A Way Out" from LifeAfter – Written by JUJU Xu (徐亦珠), Adam Gubman, and Ji Shen (沈辑); Performed by JUJU Xu (徐亦珠); "We Better Than Me" from Mobile Legends: Bang Bang – Written by Erik Castro and Chen Xueran (陳雪燃); Performed by Chen Xueran (陳雪燃); "Win for You" from PUBG Mobile – Written by K Jun, PUBG Mobile Official Team, and Lightspeed Studios Audio; Performed by KNVWN / IV

=== Music Supervision ===
Music Supervision – Film	Music Supervision – Television
Elvis – Anton Monsted; Bros – Rob Lowry; Doctor Strange in the Multiverse of Madness – Dave Jordan; Everything Everywhere All at Once – Bruce Gilbert and Lauren Marie Mikus; Minions: The Rise of Gru – Mike Knobloch and Rachel Levy; X – Joe Rudge	Stranger Things – Nora Felder; Bad Sisters – Ciara Elwis; Dahmer – Monster: The Jeffrey Dahmer Story – Amanda Krieg Thomas; Inventing Anna – Alexandra Patsavas; Reservation Dogs – Tiffany Anders; Yellowjackets – Jen Malone and Whitney Pilzer
Music Supervision – Video Game	
Horizon Forbidden West – Lucas van Tol	

=== Other ===
Music Themed Film, Biopic, or Musical	Music Documentary/Special Program
Tár – Produced by Todd Field, Scott Lambert, and Alexandra Milchan; Directed by Todd Field; Elvis – Produced by Gail Berman, Baz Luhrmann, Catherine Martin, Patrick McCormick, and Schuyler Weiss; Directed by Baz Luhrmann; Guillermo del Toro's Pinocchio – Produced by Alex Bulkley, Corey Campodonico, Guillermo del Toro, Lisa Henson, and Gary Ungar; Directed by Guillermo del Toro and Mark Gustafson; Spirited – Produced by Diana Pokorny, Daniel Silverberg, David Koplan, Sean Anders, John Morris, George Dewey, Jessica Elbaum, Ryan Reynolds, and Will Ferrell; Directed by Sean Anders and John Morris; Weird: The Al Yankovic Story – Produced by Eric Appel, Lia Buman, Mike Farah, Joe Farrell, Zachary Halley, Timothy Headington, Whitney Hodack, Henry R. Munoz III, Neil Shah, Max Silva, and "Weird Al" Yankovic; Directed by Eric Appel	Killing Me Softly with His Songs – Produced by Danny Gold, Robert Bader, Lisa Lautenberg Birer, Mark Brown, Jay Firestone, Phil Ittner, and Bruce Levine; Directed by Danny Gold; Halftime – Produced by Courtney Baxter, Jason B. Bergh, Bernardo Loyola, Christopher Rouse, and Yong Yam; Directed by Amanda Micheli and Sam Wrench; Hallelujah: Leonard Cohen, A Journey, A Song – Produced and directed by Daniel Geller and Dayna Goldfine; Louis Armstrong's Black and Blues – Produced by Oprah Winfrey, and Derik Murray; Directed by Reginald Hudlin; Selena Gomez: My Mind & Me – Produced by Alek Keshishian, Michelle An, and Katherine LeBlond; Directed by Alek Keshishian; Still Working 9 to 5 – Produced and directed by Camille Hardman and Gary Lane; The Voice of Dust and Ash – Produced by Frank Coraci and Fuschia Sumner; Directed by Mandana Biscotti
Soundtrack Album	Exhibitions, Theme Parks, Special Projects
Elvis – Various Artists; Entergalactic – Kid Cudi; Marry Me – Jennifer Lopez and Maluma; Minions: The Rise of Gru – Various Artists; Top Gun: Maverick – Lady Gaga, OneRepublic, Harold Faltermeyer, Lorne Balfe, Hans Zimmer, Kenny Loggins, and Miles Teller; Turning Red – Finneas O'Connell, Ludwig Göransson, and 4*TOWN	Frida Kahlo Immersive Exhibition – Arturo Cardelús; "Soar" Special Collaboration – Bruce Wayne (featuring Eagle Staff Marching Band Ravens, Alexandra Fresquez, and Philly Alto); Seismique Art Museum Interactive Experience – Chris Thomas; Merry Christmas and Happy New Year from "Best TV" – Fadi Awad; Star Wars: Galactic Starcruiser Hotel at Disney World – Zain Effendi
Main Title Theme – TV Show/Limited Series	Main Title Theme – TV Show (Foreign Language)
Yellowjackets – Craig Wedren and Anna Waronker; 1883 – Brian Tyler and Breton Vivian; Dangerous Liaisons – Anne Nikitin; Slow Horses – Mick Jagger and Daniel Pemberton; Wednesday – Danny Elfman	The Eight – Written by Tree Adams; Men Sharea El Haram Ela – Written by Amir Hedayah; Shadow – Written by Ashraf Elziftawi; Armas de Mujer – Written by Juan Carlos Enriquez; Frankelda's Book of Spooks – Written by Kevin Smithers; Performed by Mireya Mendoza as "Frankelda"; Lyrics by Kevin Smithers and Arturo and Roy Ambriz; Ambar 6 – Written by Layal Watfeh
Music Video (Independent)	Music – Student Film
Tarra Layne featuring J. Ivy ("A Ukrainian Love Story") – Written by Harold Arlen and E.Y. "Yip" Harburg; Performed by Tarra Layne (featuring J. Ivy); Video produced and directed by Ken Rose and Tarra Layne; Alexander James Rodriguez ("Mister Fahrenheit") – Written and performed by Alexander James Rodriguez; Directed and produced by Liz Rodriguez; Grant Maloy Smith and Kevin Lucas ("Cahokia Winds") – Written by Kevin Lucas; Arrangement, audio production, and video production by Grant Maloy Smith; Performed by Grant Maloy Smith and Kevin Lucas; Hana McCartney ("Dope") – Written and performed by Hana McCartney; Directed by Jaun Pantoja; Jesslee, Justin Champagne, and Ryan Robinette ("Chillbilly") – Written by Jesslee, Steve Virginia, Alex Pennington Smith, Jason Afable, and Justin Champagne; Performed by Jesslee, Justin Champagne, and Ryan Robinette; Jesús Molina ("Cello Stories") – Written by Jesús Molina; Performed by Jesús Molina and Haeinsane; John DeMena ("Eternal Eyes") – Written and performed by John DeMena; Music Video by Ishan Shukla; Nikkole, featuring Leon Sylvers IV ("We Can Make It If We Try") – Written by James Nyx, Marvin Gaye, Leon F. Sylvers III, Nikkole Hall, and Leon F. Sylvers IV; Performed by Nikkole and Leon Sylvers IV; Directed by Ethan Lader; Sean Pack ("Seeking Serenity") – Written and produced by Sean Pack; Video produced by Cleveland Dance Project Company and Vince Lundi Films; William Shatner ("Somehow You Do") – Written by Diane Warren; Performed by William Shatner; Directed by John Ottman	No Law, No Heaven – Joel Santos
Live Concert for Visual Media	
Shambhala Music Festival, Opening Ceremony – Composed by Zain Effendi; Vocal by Adrian The Faint; Cinematography by Jim Vanderhorst; Honor of Kings Live – Written by Weilun Chen, Dong Liu, HeartStrings, JiaChen Ding, Mi Tian, ZhiXuan Kong, Ye Liu, MingJi Wang, Jian Sun, JianHeng Li, QianDan Zhang, Angela Little, DongDong Dong, LEI, Square Musiq, ZhenKun Zhang, SiMing Shao, Hong Han, XiaoNan Yan, WenXi Wang, BuYi Mao, Oliver Kim, Ethan Jin, Jason Lee, YingQiu Wen, and TiMi Audio Lab; Vocals by BuYi Mao, Summer, and Yisa; Produced by QQmusic X Honor of King; Co-produced by TiMi L1 Studio, and TiMi Audio Lab/TME; Imagine Symphony – Composed by Chris Thomas; Performed by Henderson Symphony Orchestra; Conducted By Taras Krysa; Produced by Evan Sigvaldsen; Cinematography by Bradley Lanphear; Infinite Borders – Composed and Orchestrated by Jason Huang; Performed by Vienna Synchron Stage Orchestra; Produced and Published by NetEase Game Audio; Marry Me Live Concert Special – Original songs written by Jennifer Lopez and Maluma; Performed by Jennifer Lopez	

=== Music genre (Independent) ===
Action/Adventure	Horror/Thriller
Carlos Felipe Silva; Dario Forzato; Erez Aviram; Jina Hyojin An; Li Yihui; Winifred Phillips	Adriano Aponte; Anton du Preez; Catherine Duc (feat. Jonas Isacsson); Ivan Ruiz Serrano; Jacquie Joy; Li Yihui; Ronit Kirchman
Ambient/New Age	Instrumental
Charleene Closshey; Darlene Koldenhoven; GEM; Guthorm; Joseph L Young; Kike Ega; Mychael Danna and Tim Clément; Priya Litt; Seay; Suzanne Teng and Gilbert Levy	Alex Kovacs; Cynthia Thijs Coenraad; David Lanz and Kristin Amarie; Edu Vico; Girlie Vasallo; Kilian Alos; MohammadReza Ajdari; Nathalie Bonin; Roman Miroshnichenko; Tomas Videla
Comedy/Romcom	Neo-Classical
Ban Brothers; Best Not Broken; Cast of The Wright Turn Series; Jaimie Pangan; Michelle Lockey; Susan Muranty; Winifred Phillips	Alex Kovacs; Austin Wintory; Charles-Henri Avelange; Daniel Fisher; Fadi Awad; Joanna Jakubas; María Eugenia León; Michael Gettel; Peter Xifaras; Vig Zartman
Documentary	New/Emerging Composer
Cankat Guenel; Christian Zezza; Dan Brown, Jr.; Jerome Leroy; Luke Truan; Ryan Richko; Sandrine Rudaz; Shie Rozow	Andrea Montalbano; Dana James Presson; Dina Rizvic; Ihab Darwish; Michael Choi; Michael Kim-Sheng; Michael Maas; Nathalie Bonin; Noah Lifschey; Richard Williams
Drama/Crime	Original Recording
Adrian Boeckeler and Mack Price; Adriano Aponte; Amir Hedayah; Andrea Montalbano; Dario Forzato; Emer Kinsella; Glen Gabriel; Jacquie Joy; Jim Wilson	Areni E and Hayden Williams-Moran; G Souldier; J. Ivy; Jenny Kern; Julian Miranda (Written by Tess Cacciatore and Matt Gates); Khaled (feat. Carlos Santana); Maria Moss; Nikkole; Shayla He
Epic/Orchestral	Original Song
Cindy Paulos and Stephen Melillo; Dulce Joya Leon; Jennifer Thomas; Katie Hardyman; Luis Alberto Naranjo; Luna Pan; Michael Maas (feat. Sylvia Navarro); Robin Sandoval and Byron Gaither; Robin Spielberg and Louis Anthony deLise; Seay	April Rose Gabrielli; Cheat Codes and Russell Dickerson; Elinor Sitrish; Ella Roberts; Kristina Murrell; Nya; Omar Sicilia; Vanity Wyze and Sonny King; ZieM
Holiday	SCFI/Fantasy
Cliff Beach; Dale Effren, Debra Gussin, Jon Mullane; Doug James; Jon Mullane; Juliet Lyons and Austin Filingo; JVMIE; Mirusia; Rehya Stevens; Shani Ormiston; Tim Buppert	Cecil Abhishek; Dina Rizvic; Glen Gabriel; Holly Berry; Joseph L Young; Mark Barnes; Ronit Kirchman; Yang Zhang
