= Rika Kihira =

Japanese figure skater (born 2002)

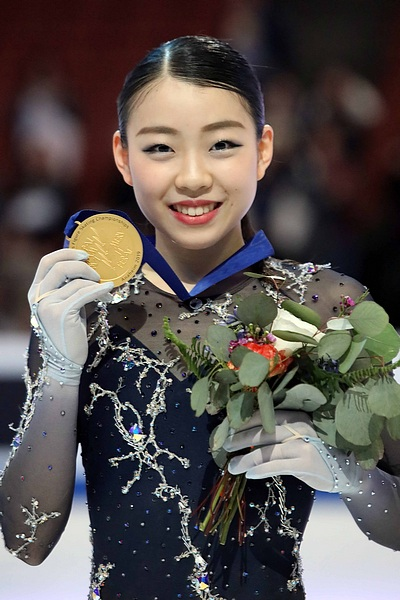
- Kihira at the 2019 Four Continents

Personal information
- Native name: 紀平 梨花 (Kihira Rika)
- Born: 21 July 2002 (age 24) Nishinomiya, Hyōgo, Japan
- Height: 1.55 m (5 ft 1 in)

Figure skating career
- Country: Japan
- Discipline: Ice dance Women's singles
- Partner: Shingo Nishiyama (since 2025)
- Coach: Romain Haguenauer; Marie-France Dubreuil; Patrice Lauzon
- Skating club: Toyota Motor Corporation
- Began skating: 2007
- Competitive: 2014–present
- Highest WS: 1st (2020–2021)
Four Continents Championships
Gold medal – first place	2019 Anaheim	Singles
Gold medal – first place	2020 Seoul	Singles
Grand Prix Final
Gold medal – first place	2018–19 Vancouver	Singles
Japan Championships
Gold medal – first place	2019–20 Tokyo	Singles
Gold medal – first place	2020–21 Nagano	Singles
Silver medal – second place	2018–19 Osaka	Singles
Bronze medal – third place	2017–18 Tokyo	Singles
World Team Trophy
Silver medal – second place	2019 Fukuoka	Team
Bronze medal – third place	2021 Osaka	Team

Rika Kihira (Japanese: 紀平 梨花; born 21 July 2002) is a Japanese figure skater. As a singles skater, she is a two-time Four Continents champion (2019, 2020), the 2018 Grand Prix Final champion, a four-time Grand Prix series medalist (2018 NHK Trophy gold, 2018 Internationaux de France gold, 2019 Skate Canada silver, 2019 NHK Trophy silver), a two-time International Challenge Cup champion, and a two-time Japanese national champion (2019, 2020).

On the junior level, she is the 2016 JGP Slovenia champion, the 2016 JGP Czech Republic silver medalist, the 2017 JGP Latvia silver medalist, and the 2017 Japanese junior national champion.

Kihira is the seventh woman to have landed the triple Axel jump in an International Skating Union competition, the first ever woman to land a triple Axel-triple toe loop combination, the first woman to land eight clean triples in a free skate, the second woman to land four clean triples in the short program, and the third woman to land twelve clean triples in one competition (all the maximum allowed under the Zayak rule).

== Personal life ==
Kihira was born on 21 July 2002 in Nishinomiya, Japan. She has an older sister, Moe, who is a model, dancer, and singer.

In December 2020, she announced that she had been accepted to Waseda University's School of Human Sciences and would start attending via correspondence course from spring 2021.

== Career ==
=== Singles skating ===
==== Early years ====
Kihira began learning to skate in 2007. In the 2015–16 season, she competed on the advanced novice level, winning gold at the Triglav Trophy. She was invited to skate in the gala at the 2015 NHK Trophy as the Japanese national novice champion in the same season.

She was initially coached by Mie Hamada and Yamato Tamura in Takatsuki, Osaka. According to Hamada, Kihira didn't have any triple jumps when she first came to her, but she still noticed Kihira's high potential in her upper body strength (from gymnastics) and speed while running. Hamada recalled that she was convinced from the first day she saw Kihira skate that she could "master a triple Axel." The first thing Hamada did was teach Kihira how to control her axis while jumping in order to prepare her for triple jumps.

==== 2016–17 season: International junior debut ====
Kihira made her Junior Grand Prix (JGP) debut in the 2016–17 season. In early September, she won the silver medal in Ostrava, Czech Republic, with a total score 0.08 less than Anastasiia Gubanova of Russia. Later that month, she outscored World junior champion Marin Honda by 15.49 points for the gold in Ljubljana, Slovenia. Kihira landed a triple Axel jump in the free skate, becoming the seventh ladies skater in history to do so. She also became the first female skater ever to land eight clean triples in the free skate (the maximum allowed under the Zayak rule). She qualified to the 2016–17 JGP Final in Marseille, France, where she finished fourth.

==== 2017–18 season: Second JGPF ====
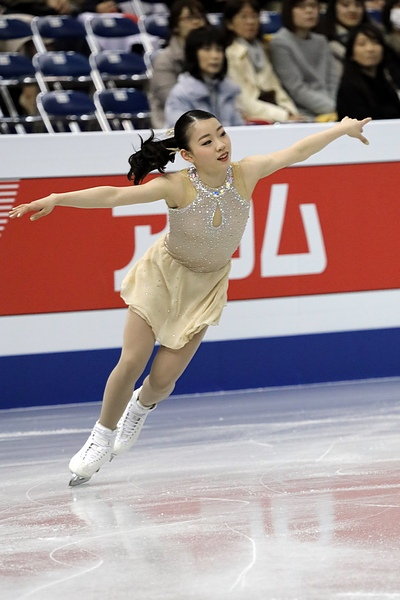
Kihira at the 2017–18 JGP Final.

Kihira began her season by winning a gold medal at the Asian Trophy in Hong Kong. She was able to land a triple Axel in her free skate.

Kihira was assigned JGP events in Latvia and Italy. In her first event at JGP Riga, Kihira placed sixth in the short program after stepping out of her triple flip and falling on her triple Lutz. After winning the free skate, she finished second overall behind Daria Panenkova.

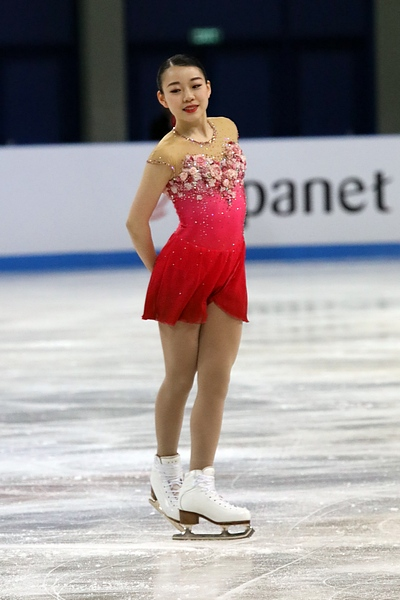
Kihira at the 2018 World Junior Championships.

In her next event at JGP Egna, she won the bronze medal behind Sofia Samodurova and Alena Kostornaia after placing second in the short program and third in the free skate. The results qualified her for her second JGP Final in Nagoya, Japan over Mako Yamashita through a tiebreaker.

At the 2017 JGP Final, she became the first-ever woman to land a triple Axel-triple jump combination in an international competition organized by the International Skating Union. She was the only non-Russian competitor and finished fourth overall, following a popped Axel and an under-rotation on another jump.

Kihira won the gold medal at Junior Nationals. She placed sixth in the short program but rebounded in the free skate with a triple Axel and triple Axel-triple toe loop-double toe loop.

On the senior level, Kihira won the bronze medal at Japanese Nationals after placing fifth in the short program and second in the free skate. As she was age-ineligible to compete as a senior, she was sent to the 2018 World Junior Championships, where she placed eighth.

==== 2018–19 season: Grand Prix Final & Four Continents gold ====
Making her senior debut, Kihira began the season with a gold medal at the 2018 Ondrej Nepela Trophy, an ISU Challenger Series event. Kihira placed first in the short program, despite falling on her triple Axel. She also placed first in the long program with eight fully rotated triple jumps, including a triple Axel-triple toe loop and a solo triple Axel, and set a free skate world record of 147.37 points.

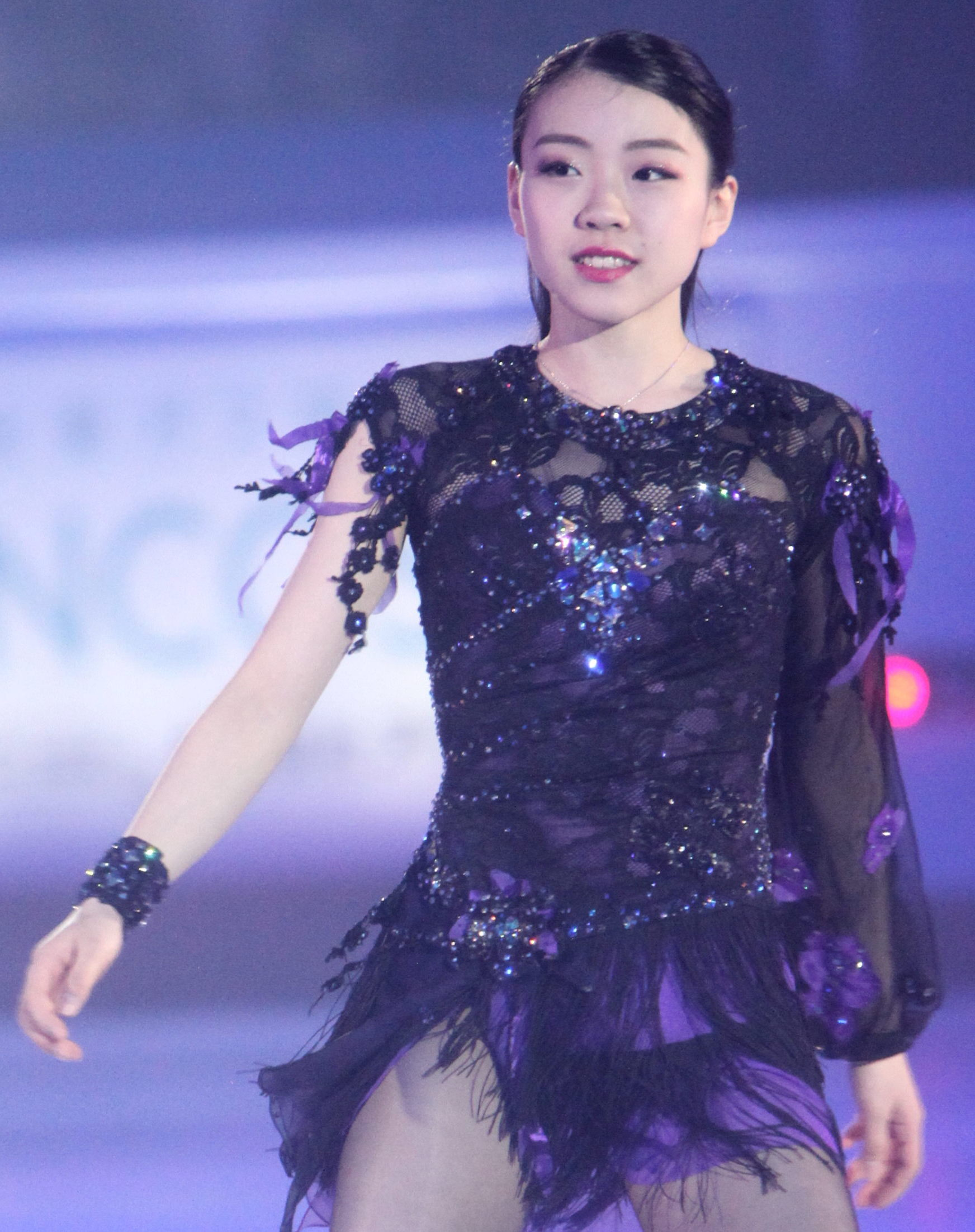
Kihira at the exhibition gala of the 2018 Internationaux de France.

For her senior Grand Prix debut, Kihira was originally assigned only one event. At 2018 NHK Trophy, Kihira was fifth in the short program after underrotating and falling on her triple Axel again. She placed first in the free skate with a solo triple Axel, a triple Axel-triple toe loop, and eight triple jumps in total, winning the gold medal overall. In doing so, she finished ahead of compatriot and reigning Japanese national champion Satoko Miyahara and 2015 World Champion Elizaveta Tuktamysheva, who also performed a triple Axel in her free program. She admitted afterward: "When I finished my short program, I didn’t think I would be up here today. The short program motivated me to be good today."

Due to her results at the 2018 NHK Trophy, Kihira was assigned another Grand Prix event. At the Internationaux de France, Kihira singled the triple Axel in the short program, placing third. In the free skate, she underrotated her sole triple Axel attempt but still placed first and captured her second Grand Prix gold medal. Kihira stated that she was glad to have won but was unsatisfied with her performance.

The 2018–19 Grand Prix Final was regarded by many commentators as a contest between Kihira and reigning Olympic champion Alina Zagitova, who had been forced to withdraw from the Ondrej Nepela Trophy earlier due to visa issues. Kihira won the short program with a world record score of 82.51, landing the triple Axel in the short program for the first time that season. She then placed first in the free skate with a score of 150.61 and won the gold medal, despite downgrading and falling on her opening triple Axel.

Kihira entered the 2018 Japanese Championships as a favourite to take the national title, but she struggled with boot problems in the competition and made multiple errors in the short program that, left her in fifth place going into the free skate. She placed first in the free skate, her only mistake being a downgraded Euler in her three-jump combination. However, she won the silver medal overall in front of training mate and four-time national champion Satoko Miyahara. The gold medal went to Kaori Sakamoto.

At the 2019 Four Continents Championships, Kihira initially "hesitated" at including the triple Axel in the short program but chose to do so and singled it. She placed fifth in the short. In the free program, Kihira landed one triple Axel and substituted a double Axel-triple toe loop combination for the second, winning both the free program and the overall championship decisively. She observed: "During this season, I learned how to keep my concentration in my free skating no matter what happens in my short program."

Kihira was one of three Japanese ladies assigned to the 2019 World Championships, held in Saitama, and based on her record that season was widely considered the favourite to win the title. In the short program, she once again singled her triple Axel attempt, leaving her in seventh place and outside of the final group of six skaters. She came second in the free skate, earning a silver small medal, landing a clean triple Axel-triple toe loop and falling on her second triple Axel. In fourth overall, she was 0.31 points behind bronze medalist Evgenia Medvedeva and 1.27 points behind silver medalist Elizabet Tursynbaeva. It was the only podium Kihira missed in the season and the only international competition she did not win.

Kihira concluded the season representing Team Japan at the 2019 World Team Trophy. She landed the triple Axel in the short program for only the second time that season, setting another world record of 83.97. However, Kihira fell twice in the free, once on her opening triple Axel and the other on her triple Lutz-triple toe loop combination, placing fifth. Team Japan won the silver medal overall.

==== 2019–20 season: First national title & second Four Continents gold ====
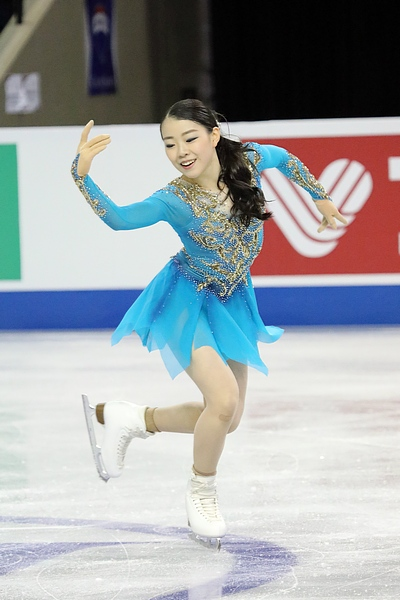
Kihira at 2019 Skate Canada International.

Kihira began her season at 2019 CS Autumn Classic International, where she ranked first in both the short program and in the free, finishing in first place overall, and landing all three of her planned triple Axels, albeit with one called underrotated. Kihira stated that she hoped to introduce a quad Salchow into competition later in the season but had declined to attempt it there as she felt her triple Axel was more stable. Although she landed one triple Lutz in her free skate at this event, a persistent ankle problem led her not to attempt any further triple Lutz jumps in competition during the first half of the season.

Her next competition was Skate Canada, where she placed first after a clean short program scoring 81.35. In the free skate, Kihira stepped out of her first triple Axel but had a clean skate after that. She earned 148.98 points in the free skate to score 230.33 overall and finish second overall behind Alexandra Trusova, who landed three quad jumps in her free skate. Kihira stated afterward that Trusova's performance motivated her to work to increase her scoring potential in the future. Competing at the 2019 NHK Trophy, Kihira landed her Axel and combination cleanly but had a poor landing on her triple loop, placing second behind Alena Kostornaia, who also performed a triple Axel and broke Kihira's short program world record. Having also finished second in the free skate, she won a second silver medal and qualified for the Grand Prix Final. Kihira stated afterward that her ankle continued to be a problem after three months, with the possibility that it might be a tendon issue that would require time away from competition to heal.

Competing at the Grand Prix Final, Kihira put her foot down on her triple Axel and fell on her jump combination, consequently placing sixth out of the six skaters in the segment, almost fifteen points behind Kostornaia in first place. Kihira expressed regret over her performance, attributing much of it to discomfort with skating in the evening rather than the morning. In the free skate, Kihira attempted the quad Salchow in competition for the first time, fully rotating the jump but falling. She placed fourth in that segment and rose to fourth place overall. Speaking afterward, Kihira said, "as for the quads, a lot of girls are doing different quads now, and I know I also need to work harder. Of course, I want to first get my quad Salchow consistent, and then maybe I will try quad toe."

Entering the 2019–20 Japanese Championships as the favourite for the title, Kihira placed first in the short program despite stepping out of her triple Axel and losing levels on one of her spins. She won the free skate commandingly, making only a single error when she under-rotated the triple toe loop in her opening jump combination, and took the Japanese national title for the first time ahead of Wakaba Higuchi and Tomoe Kawabata. She indicated that she hoped to reintroduce the triple Lutz into competition for the 2020 World Championships.

In February, Kihira competed at the 2020 Four Continents Championships with countrywomen Higuchi and Kaori Sakamoto. In the short program, she placed first ahead of Bradie Tennell of the United States and training mate You Young of South Korea. She included the triple Lutz for the first time since the Autumn Classic. In the free skate, she popped her first triple Axel attempt to a single, the first time she had done so during that season, but performed the rest of the program cleanly and improvised an additional triple-triple combination. She, therefore, still performed eight triple jumps and, for the first time in international competition, landed twelve clean triple jumps in one competition. She won the free skate and the overall competition with a new season's best-combined total (232.34) ahead of You and Tennell. She became the first singles skater, male or female, to win consecutive Four Continents titles. She then won the 2020 International Challenge Cup ahead of compatriot Yuhana Yokoi. She once again scored over 230 points in the combined total, making her one of only two ladies skaters to score over 200 points in every competition they entered in both the 2018–19 and 2019–20 seasons, along with Alexandra Trusova of Russia.

Kihira was scheduled to compete at the 2020 World Championships in Montreal, but the event was cancelled as a result of the coronavirus pandemic. In June, Kihira announced that she would add Brian Orser, the coach of Olympic champions Yuna Kim and Yuzuru Hanyu, to her coaching team, and begin training at the Toronto Cricket, Skating & Curling Club as soon as travel restrictions allowed. She stated that the motivation behind this change was a desire to better her technique and master a greater range of quadruple jumps. However, the persistence of travel restrictions through July required her to abandon plans to have programs choreographed by Lori Nichol in Toronto. She subsequently spent time at Stephane Lambiel's training camp in Switzerland.

==== 2020–21 season: First quad & second national title ====
Continuing to train in Champéry under Lambiel rather than go to Canada or return to Japan, Kihira was correspondingly assigned to compete at the 2020 Internationaux de France when the ISU assigned skaters to compete at one event apiece for the 2020–21 Grand Prix. In October, her ISU bio formally listed Lambiel as one of her coaches, with the other being Hamada. The Internationaux was subsequently cancelled as a result of the pandemic.

Kihira returned to Japan to compete at the 2020–21 Japan Championships, where she was considered the heavy favourite to win. The possibility of her again attempting the quad Salchow in competition was much-discussed in advance of the event. Kihira said that the decision to attempt it in the free skate would depend on how the short program went. She won the short program despite a minor error on the second part of her jump combination and a lost spin level, ending the segment with a lead of 7.48 points over second-place Kaori Sakamoto. Kihira opened her free program by successfully landing a quad Salchow. She went on to underrotate her only triple Axel attempt in the free and did not attempt a triple Lutz, but won the segment and the gold medal overall ahead of former champions Sakamoto and Satoko Miyahara. Of the quad, she said afterward that "I'd wanted to do it before, but this time I pushed any nerves and any extraneous thoughts out of my mind and just focused on an image of me nailing it."

Kihira was chosen to represent Japan at the 2021 World Championships, where she was rated as a contender for the title alongside the top Russian skaters. She placed second in the short program after her triple Axel and toe loop were a quarter of a rotation short. In the free skate, Kihira doubled her first attempt at a triple Axel, fell on an underrotated second attempt, and underrotated two other jumps, finishing ninth in that segment and dropping to seventh place overall. Her placement, combined with that of Sakamoto, who finished above her in sixth, qualified three ladies' berths for Japan to the 2022 Winter Olympics.

Subsequently, Kihira was announced as part of the Japanese team for the 2021 World Team Trophy. She did not plan to attempt the quad Salchow jump due to suffering from a lower-back strain and also returned to her previous free skate music for the competition. Kihira placed fourth in the short program and fifth in the free skate at the Trophy, while Team Japan won the bronze medal.

==== 2021–22 season: Coaching change, hiatus ====
Kihira injured her right ankle in July, diagnosed as an osteochondral problem. With the Canadian border reopening to international travelers on September 7, 2021, Kihira's management announced on September 8 that she would be leaving her Swiss training base with Lambiel to train in Toronto under Brian Orser.

Kihira withdrew from the 2021 CS Asian Open Trophy, her first assigned competition of the season, and was replaced by Mai Mihara. Continuing to rehabilitate her ankle, she withdrew from the 2021 Skate Canada International, her first Grand Prix assignment, and was again replaced by Mihara. She later withdrew from 2021 NHK Trophy as well, with Mana Kawabe being called up to replace her.

Kihira withdrew from the 2021–22 Japan Championships due to a talus stress fracture in her right foot, first discovered in July 2021. She expressed the intention to concentrate on treatment as per doctors' recommendations. As a result, Kihira could not qualify for a spot for the Japanese Olympic team, as she did not meet the criteria for an injury bye, which required a top three finish at a World Championships, her highest finish to date being fourth at the 2019 World Championships.

==== 2022–23 season ====
Continuing to nurse an injury, Kihira accepted an invitation to participate in the Japan Open, saying that she was "not pushing it right now and saving myself in practice but decided to enter anyway." Competing with lessened jump content, she was fifth among six female competitors, scoring 113.44. Kihira was pleased with the result, saying she was "getting my stamina back quite a bit" and that she hoped to be fully recovered" for the Grand Prix.

Following the Japan Open, Kihira was able to return to the Toronto Cricket, Skating and Curling Club to train with coach Brian Orser in person for three weeks in advance of the 2022 Skate Canada International. Orser advised her that this would be "just a start" in light of her continued injury. She placed fifth at that event while not attempting any Lutz or flip jumps. Kihira said afterward that she was "making progress, little by little, and my goal is to get all my triples back." At her second event, the 2022 Grand Prix of Espoo, Kihira finished sixth in the short program. In the free skate, she successfully reintroduced the triple flip, finishing fourth in that segment and fourth overall, 4.98 points behind bronze medalist Mana Kawabe. She said afterward it was a performance "that will give me confidence."

Kihira placed eleventh in the short program at the 2022–23 Japan Championships, after performing only a triple-double jump combination and underrotating two jumps. She was eighth in the free skate, but remained eleventh overall.

==== 2023–24 to 2025–26 season: Hiatus ====
Kihira was initially assigned to compete at the 2023 Skate Canada International, but she withdrew due to the continuing effects of her injury, saying that she wanted to heal and focus on competing at the 2026 Winter Olympics. She did not compete that season or the next. In September of the 2025–2026 season, she entered the Chūbu regional competition, a qualifying competition for the Japan Figure Skating Championships, but she withdrew a few days before the competition. She said that she was unable to prepare sufficiently to compete as she continued to experience pain in her right ankle when training difficult jumps. She expressed frustration over not being able to train as she wanted but said she intended to continue trying to return to competition.

=== Ice dance with Shingo Nishiyama ===
==== 2025–26 season: Debut of Kihira/Nishiyama ====
In September 2025, Kihira announced that she had teamed up with Shingo Nishiyama with the intention to compete in the ice dance discipline while also continuing to train as a singles skater. She also shared that she and Nishiyama would train at the Ice Academy of Montreal in Montreal, Quebec, Canada, coached by Romain Haguenauer, Marie-France Dubreuil, and Patrice Lauzon.

In late October, Kihira/Nishiyama debuted as a team at the 2025 Western Sectional Championships, a qualifying competition for the Japanese National Championships, where they won the bronze medal. Prior to the event, Kihira suffered a minor rib fracture.

In late December, Kihira/Nishiyama competed at the 2025–26 Japan Championships, where they finished in fourth place.

==== 2026–27 season ====
Kihira/Nishiyama debuted internationally at the 2026 Kinoshita Group Cup, where they placed 8th.

== Skating technique ==
Kihira is regarded as a complete skater for her combination of technical and artistic excellence. Analysts have praised the execution and quality of her jumps, noting their textbook, efficient technique and exceptional distance, rotation speed, rhythm, effortlessness, flow, landing quality, and body position. Her triple Axel and triple Lutz have received GOE as high as +3.09 and +2.36, respectively. She has notably never received an edge call in her junior or senior career since both her Lutz and Flip have correct take-off edges.

In addition to executing her jumps with high GOE scores, Kihira is also known for landing challenging and difficult jumps. She is the first female skater to land eight fully rotated triples in a program. She has landed triple Axels and triple Axel-triple toe loops in international competition, being the first and now one of two ladies who has achieved the latter. She was the youngest lady to land the triple Axel in an ISU-sanctioned competition until Alysa Liu. She has also landed triple Axels in a three-part combination in domestic competition. She is training the quad toe loop and quad Salchow. She first attempted the quad Salchow in competition at the 2019–20 Grand Prix Final during her free skate, fully rotating but falling on the jump. Her second attempt in competition, at the 2020-21 Japanese National Championships, was landed cleanly with positive grades of execution.

In addition to her jumps, analysts have discussed her skating skills and presentation, including her edge work, multi-directional skating, acceleration, ice coverage, flow, upper-body carriage, and extension.

== Programs ==
=== Ice dance with Shingo Nishiyama ===
Season	Short program	Free skating	Exhibition
2026–2027	golden hour (Fujii Kaze Remix) by JVKE & Fujii Kaze; this is what falling in love feels like by JVKE choreo. by Romain Haguenauer	Mon Dieu by Édith Piaf performed by Patricia Kaas; Song for the Little Sparrow by Patricia Kaas choreo. by Romain Haguenauer	
2025–2026	Mambo No. 5 (A Little Bit Of...) by Lou Bega; Scatman & Hatman by Scatman John & Lou Bega choreo. by Romain Haguenauer	Princess Mononoke; I. The Legend Of Ashitaka; II. TA TA RI GAMI; V. Mononoke Hime; I. The Legend Of Ashitaka by Joe Hisaishi & New Japan Philharmonic World Dream Orchestra choreo. by Romain Haguenauer & Marie-France Dubreuil	

=== Singles skating ===
Season	Short program	Free skating	Exhibition
2023–2024		Titanic: Distant Memories; A Building Panic; Rose; Unable to Stay, Unwilling to Leave by James Horner choreo. by David Wilson	
2022–2023	The Fire Within by Jennifer Thomas choreo. by Benoit Richaud	Titanic: Distant Memories; A Building Panic; Rose; Unable to Stay, Unwilling to Leave by James Horner choreo. by David Wilson	You Raise Me Up by Celtic Woman
2021–2022	The Fire Within by Jennifer Thomas choreo. by Benoit Richaud	Titanic: Distant Memories; A Building Panic; Rose; Unable to Stay, Unwilling to Leave by James Horner choreo. by David Wilson	You Raise Me Up by Celtic Woman
2020–2021	The Fire Within by Jennifer Thomas choreo. by Benoit Richaud	International Angel of Peace; choreo. by Tom Dickson: Baby, God Bless You by Shinya Kiyozuka choreo. by Stephane Lambiel	Bebop and Lulu by Louise Hoffsten; 2002 by Anne-Marie
2019–2020	Breakfast in Baghdad by Ulf Wakenius performed by Na Yoon-sun choreo. by Shae-Lynn Bourne	International Angel of Peace: O Virtus Sapientae by Hildegard of Bingen performed by Maya Beiser; Beirut Taxi (from Syriana) by Alexandre Desplat; Wings of The Eagle by Uttara-kuru; Caravans on the Move by Mike Batt; Mother Tongue by Dead Can Dance; Sacred Stone by Sheila Chandra; In A Moment Of Greatness by Larry Groupé choreo. by Tom Dickson	2002 by Anne-Marie; Spirit; Bigger by Beyoncé; The Greatest by Sia
2018–2019	Clair de Lune by Claude Debussy choreo. by David Wilson	A Beautiful Storm by Jennifer Thomas choreo. by Tom Dickson	The Greatest by Sia; La Vie en rose by Édith Piaf; Faded by Alan Walker
2017–2018	Kung Fu Piano by The Piano Guys choreo. by Tom Dickson	La Strada by Nino Rota choreo. by Jeffrey Buttle	La Vie en rose by Édith Piaf; Symphony by Clean Bandit ft. Zara Larsson
2016–2017	Tzigane by Maurice Ravel choreo. by Jeffrey Buttle	Rhapsody in Blue by George Gershwin choreo. by Tom Dickson	Symphony by Clean Bandit ft. Zara Larsson; A Whole New World (from Aladdin) by Alan Menken, Tim Rice
2015–2016	Die Fledermaus by Johann Strauss II	Kiss of the Vampire by James Bernard	Die Fledermaus by Johann Strauss II

=== World record scores ===
Kihira has set three world record scores under the new +5 / -5 GOE (Grade of Execution) system.

Senior ladies' short program records
Date	Score	Event	Note
11 April 2019	83.97	2019 World Team Trophy	Record was broken by Alena Kostornaia of Russia at the 2019 NHK Trophy.
6 December 2018	82.51	2018–19 Grand Prix Final	
Senior ladies' free skating records
Date	Score	Event	Note
22 September 2018	147.37	2018 CS Ondrej Nepela Trophy	Record was broken by Alina Zagitova of Russia at the 2018 CS Nebelhorn Trophy.

== Competitive highlights ==
- GP – Event of the ISU Grand Prix Series
- JGP – Event of the ISU Junior Grand Prix Series
- CS – Event of the ISU Challenger Series
- TBD – Assigned
- WD – Withdrew from competition
- C – Cancelled
- Medals at team events are awarded for the team results only. Individual placements at team events are listed in parentheses.

=== Ice dance with Shingo Nishiyama ===
ISU personal best scores in the +5/-5 GOE System
Segment	Type	Score	Event
Total	TSS	156.86	2026 CS Kinoshita Group Cup
Rhythm dance	TSS	61.37	2026 CS Kinoshita Group Cup
Rhythm dance	TES	34.84	2026 CS Kinoshita Group Cup
Rhythm dance	PCS	26.53	2026 CS Kinoshita Group Cup
Free dance	TSS	95.49	2026 CS Kinoshita Group Cup
Free dance	TES	52.79	2026 CS Kinoshita Group Cup
Free dance	PCS	42.70	2026 CS Kinoshita Group Cup

Competition placements at senior level
Season	2025–26	2026–27
GP NHK Trophy		TBD
CS Kinoshita Group Cup		8th
Japan Championships	4th	

=== Singles skating ===
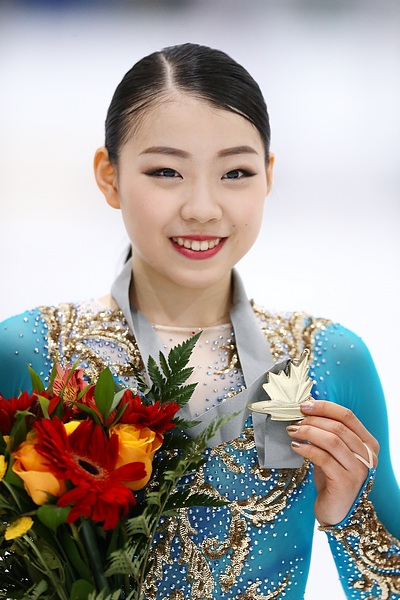
Kihira at the 2019 CS Autumn Classic International

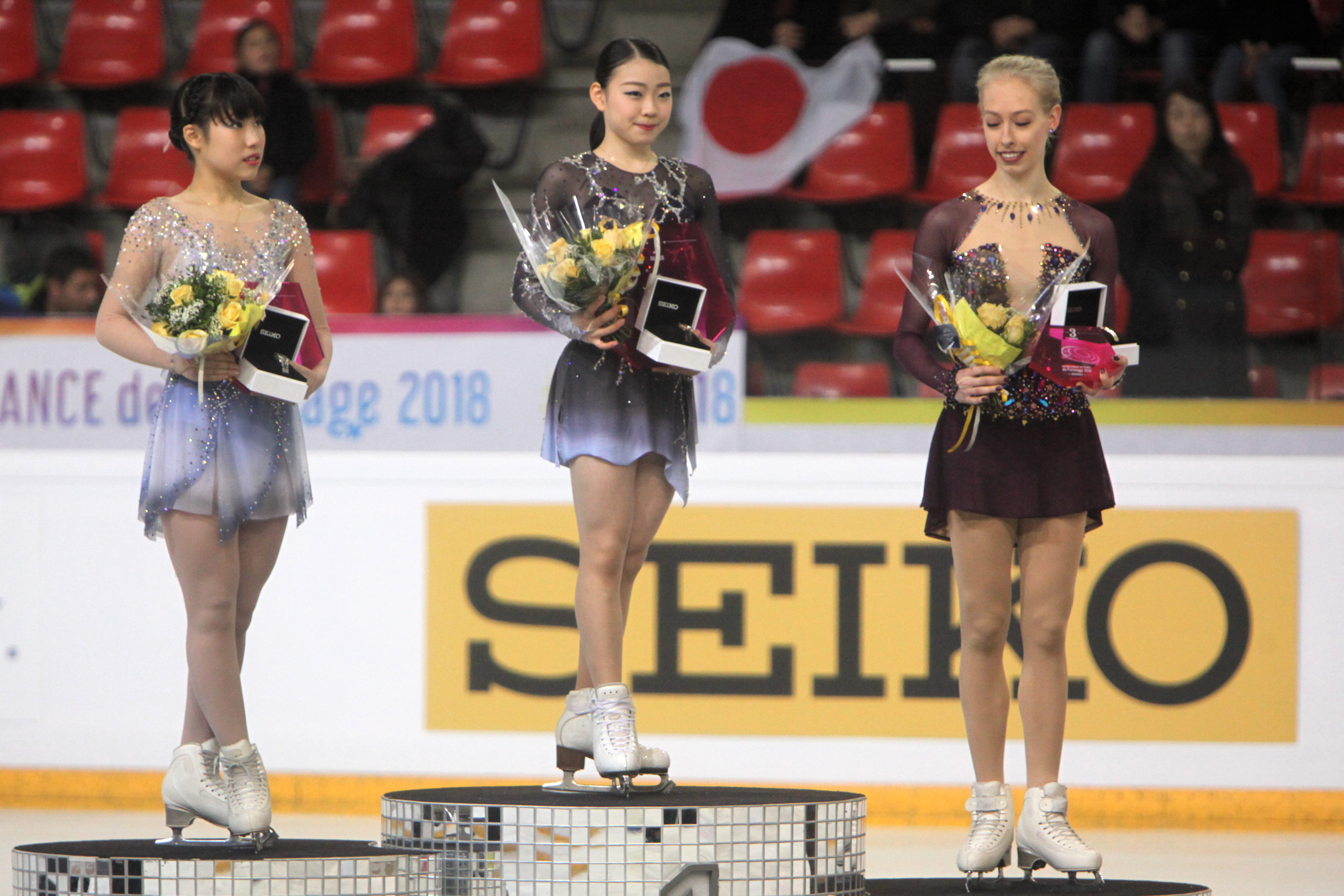
Kihira (center) with Mai Mihara (left) and Bradie Tennell (right) at the 2018 Internationaux de France podium.

Competition placements at senior level
Season	2017-18	2018-19	2019-20	2020-21	2022-23
World Championships		4th	C	7th	
Four Continents Championships		1st	1st		
Grand Prix Final		1st	4th		
Japan Championships	3rd	2nd	1st	1st	11th
World Team Trophy		2nd (4th)		3rd (4th)	
GP Finland					4th
GP France		1st		C	
GP NHK Trophy		1st	2nd		
GP Skate Canada			2nd		5th
CS Autumn Classic			1st		
CS Nepela Memorial		1st			
Challenge Cup		1st	1st		
Japan Open			2nd (3rd)		1st (5th)

Competition placements at junior level
Season	2015-16	2016-17	2017-18
Junior World Championships			8th
Junior Grand Prix Final		4th	4th
Japanese Championships	11th	11th	1st
JGP Czech Republic		2nd	
JGP Italy			3rd
JGP Latvia			2nd
JGP Slovenia		1st	
Asian Open Trophy			1st

== Detailed results ==
=== Ice dance with Shingo Nishiyama ===
- Small medals for the short program and free skating are only awarded at ISU Championships.
- Medals at team events are awarded for the team results only. Individual placements at team events are listed in parentheses.
- ISU Personal Bests highlighted in **bold**.

Results in the 2026–27 season
Date	Event	RD		FD		Total	
Date	Event	P	Score	P	Score	P	Score
Sep 4 – 6, 2026	(Japan) 2026 Kinoshita Group Cup	8	**61.37**	9	**95.49**	8	**156.86**
Nov 27–29, 2026	(Japan) 2026 NHK Trophy						TBD

Results in the 2025–26 season
Date	Event	RD		FD		Total	
Date	Event	P	Score	P	Score	P	Score
Dec 18 – 21, 2025	2025–26 Japan Championships	3	57.44	4	86.97	4	144.41

=== Women's singles ===
ISU personal best scores in the +5/-5 GOE System
Segment	Type	Score	Event
Total	**TSS**	**233.12**	2018–19 Grand Prix Final
Short program	**TSS**	**83.97**	2019 World Team Trophy
Short program	TES	48.17	2019 World Team Trophy
Short program	PCS	35.80	2019 World Team Trophy
Free skating	**TSS**	**154.72**	2018 NHK Trophy
Free skating	TES	87.17	2018 NHK Trophy
Free skating	PCS	72.52	2019 NHK Trophy

ISU personal best scores in the +3/-3 GOE System
Segment	Type	Score	Event
Total	**TSS**	**194.24**	2016 JGP Slovenia
Short program	**TSS**	**66.82**	2017–18 JGP Final
Short program	TES	38.81	2016 JGP Czech Republic
Short program	PCS	28.86	2018 Junior Worlds
Free skating	**TSS**	**128.31**	2016 JGP Slovenia
Free skating	TES	71.74	2016 JGP Slovenia
Free skating	PCS	58.51	2017–18 JGP Final

==== Senior level ====
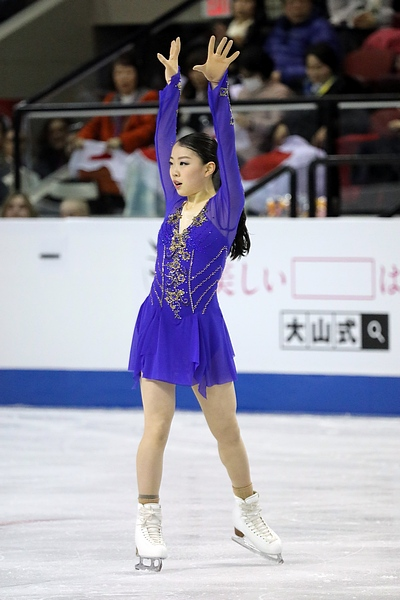
Kihira at 2019 Skate Canada International.

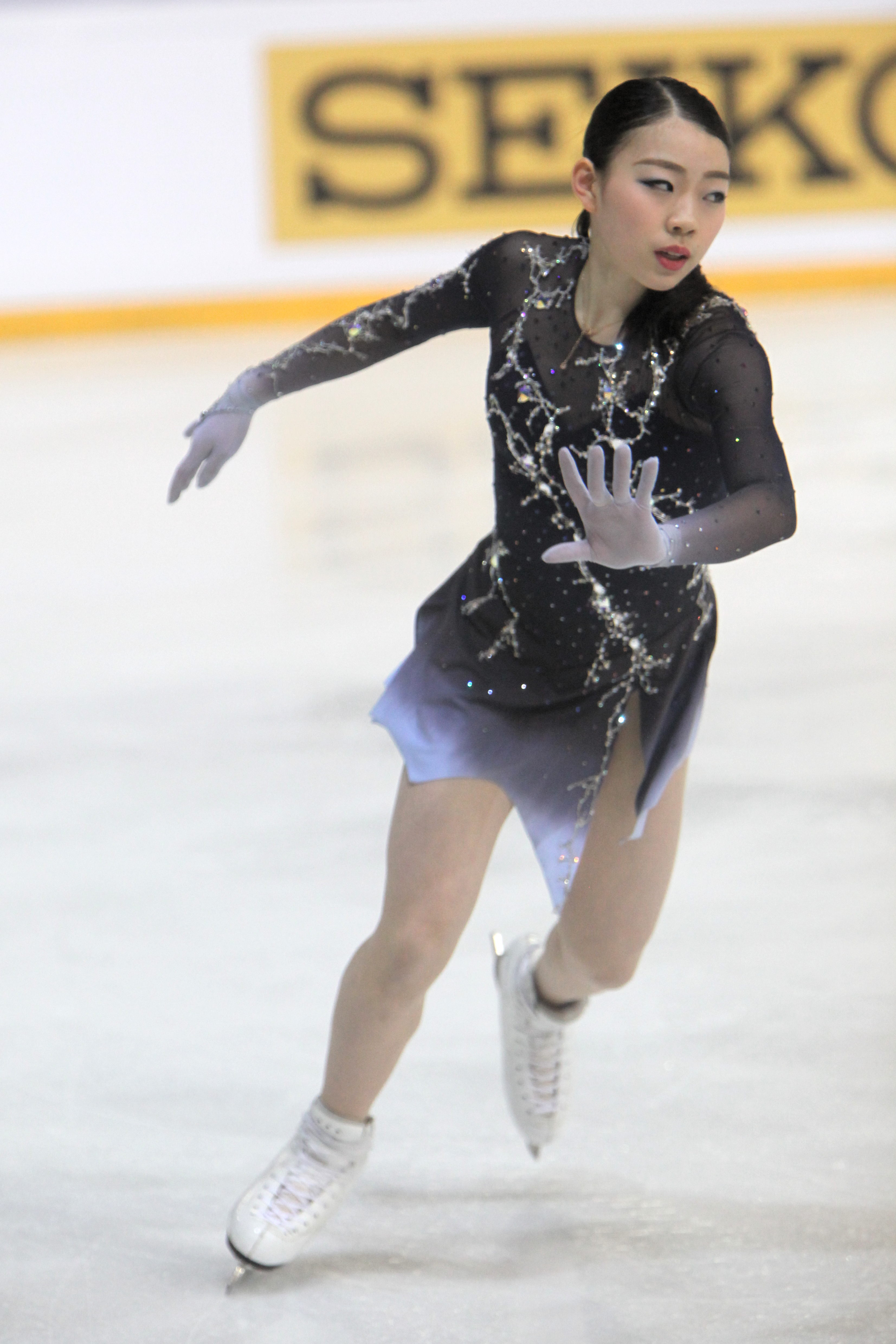
Kihira at the 2018 Internationaux de France.

Results in the 2018–19 season
Date	Event	SP		FS		Total	
Date	Event	P	Score	P	Score	P	Score
Sep 19 – 22, 2018	(Slovakia) 2018 CS Ondrej Nepela Trophy	1	70.79	1	147.37	1	218.16
Nov 9 – 11, 2018	(Japan) 2018 NHK Trophy	5	69.59	1	**154.72**	1	224.31
Nov 23 – 25, 2018	2018 Internationaux de France	2	67.64	1	138.28	1	205.92
Dec 6 – 9, 2018	(Canada) 2018-19 Grand Prix Final	1	82.51	1	150.61	1	**233.12**
Dec 20 – 24, 2018	2018-19 Japan Championships	5	68.75	1	155.01	2	223.76
Feb 7 – 10, 2019	(United States) 2019 Four Continents Championships	5	68.85	1	153.14	1	221.99
Feb 21 – 24, 2019	(Netherlands) 2019 Challenge Cup	2	66.44	1	141.90	1	208.34
Mar 18 – 24, 2019	(Japan) 2019 World Championships	7	70.90	2	152.59	4	223.49
Apr 11 – 14, 2019	(Japan) 2019 World Team Trophy	1	**83.97**	5	138.37	2 (4)	222.34

Results in the 2019–20 season
Date	Event	SP		FS		Total	
Date	Event	P	Score	P	Score	P	Score
Sep 12 – 14, 2019	(Canada) 2019 CS Autumn Classic International	1	78.18	1	145.98	1	224.16
Oct 5, 2019	2019 Japan Open	—N/a	—N/a	3	144.76	2	—N/a
October 25 – 27, 2019	2019 Skate Canada International	1	81.35	2	148.98	2	230.33
Nov 22 – 24, 2019	(Japan) 2019 NHK Trophy	2	79.89	2	151.95	2	231.84
Dec 5 – 8, 2019	(Italy) 2019-20 Grand Prix Final	6	70.71	4	145.76	4	216.47
Dec 18 – 22, 2019	2019-20 Japan Championships	1	73.98	1	155.22	1	229.20
Feb 4 – 9, 2020	(South Korea) 2020 Four Continents Championships	1	81.18	1	151.16	1	232.34
Feb 20 – 23, 2020	(Netherlands) 2020 Challenge Cup	1	74.27	1	156.38	1	230.65

Results in the 2020–21 season
Date	Event	SP		FS		Total	
Date	Event	P	Score	P	Score	P	Score
Dec 23 – 27, 2020	2020-21 Japan Championships	1	79.34	1	154.90	1	234.24
Mar 22 – 28, 2021	(Sweden) 2019 World Championships	2	79.08	9	126.62	7	205.70
Apr 15 – 18, 2021	(Japan) 2019 World Team Trophy	4	69.74	5	132.39	3 (4)	202.13

Results in the 2022–23 season
Date	Event	SP		FS		Total	
Date	Event	P	Score	P	Score	P	Score
Oct 8, 2022	2022 Japan Open	—N/a	—N/a	5	113.44	1	—N/a
Oct 28 – 30, 2022	2022 Skate Canada International	8	59.27	3	125.06	5	184.33
Nov 25 – 27, 2022	(Finland) 2022 Grand Prix of Espoo	6	64.07	4	128.36	4	192.43
Dec 21 – 25, 2022	2022-23 Japan Championships	11	60.43	8	128.19	11	188.62

==== Junior level ====
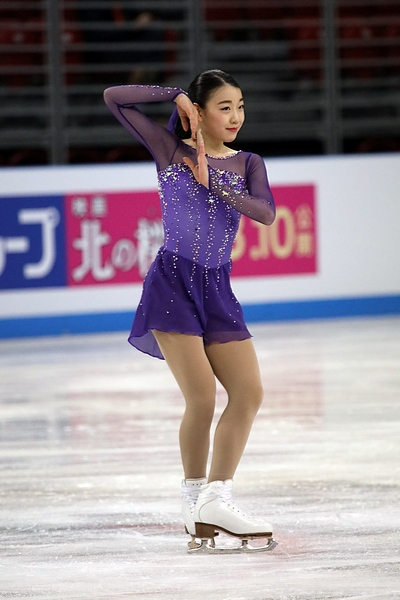
Kihira at the 2018 World Junior Championships.

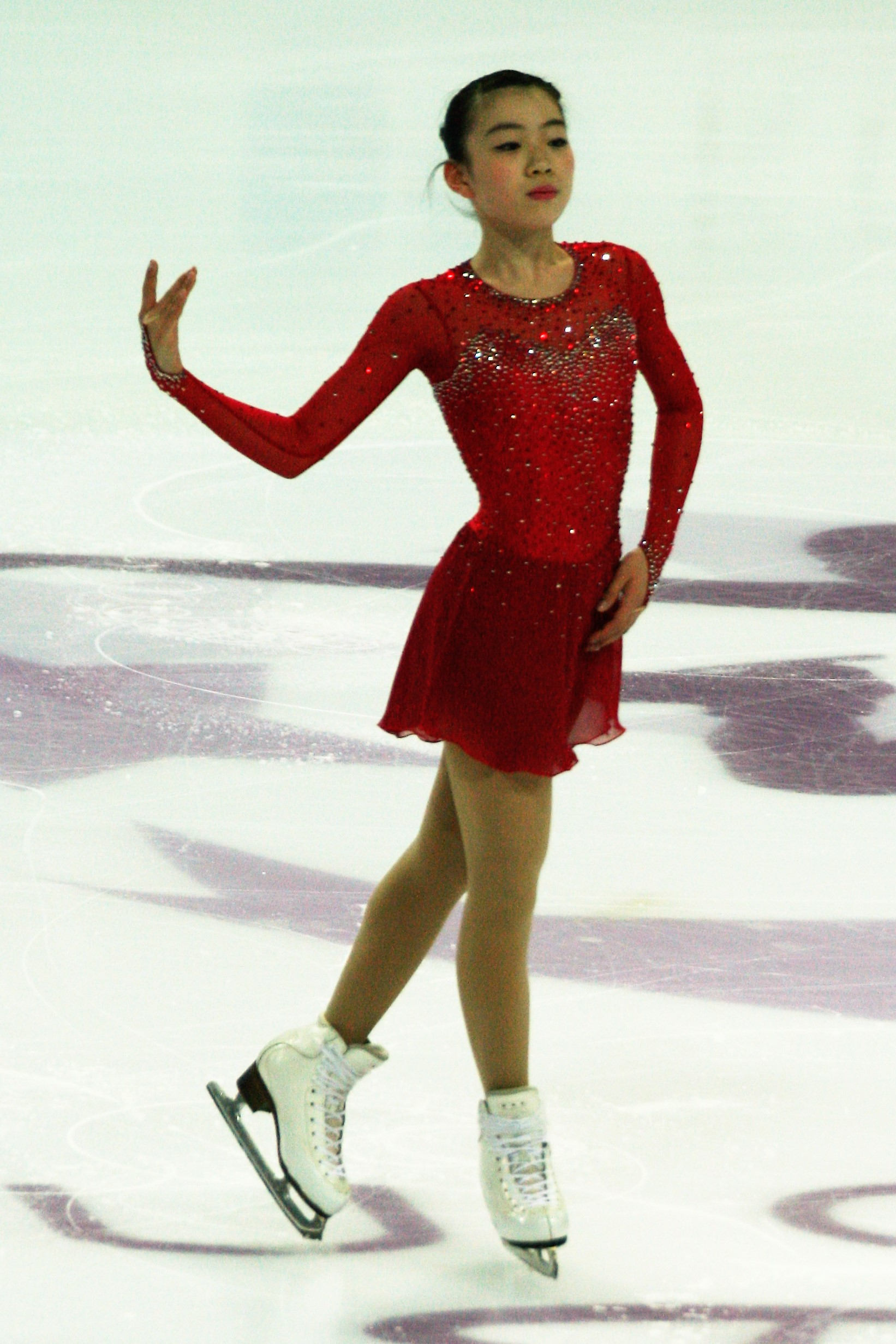
Kihira at the 2016–17 JGP Final.

Results in the 2015–16 season
Date	Event	SP		FS		Total	
Date	Event	P	Score	P	Score	P	Score
Nov 21 – 23, 2015	2015-16 Japan Championships (Junior)	8	53.38	15	89.53	11	142.91

Results in the 2016-17 season
Date	Event	SP		FS		Total	
Date	Event	P	Score	P	Score	P	Score
Aug 31 – Sep 3, 2016	2016 JGP Czech Republic	1	66.78	2	118.73	2	185.51
Sep 21 – 25, 2016	2016 JGP Slovenia	2	65.93	1	128.31	1	194.24
Nov 18 – 20, 2016	2016-17 Japan Championships (Junior)	4	58.86	14	94.87	11	153.73
Dec 8 – 11, 2016	(France) 2016-17 Junior Grand Prix Final	5	54.78	3	120.38	4	175.16

Results in the 2017-18 season
Date	Event	SP		FS		Total	
Date	Event	P	Score	P	Score	P	Score
Aug 2 – 5, 2017	(Hong Kong) 2017 Asian Open Trophy	1	60.26	1	122.80	1	183.06
Sep 6 – 9, 2017	2017 JGP Latvia	6	55.05	1	125.41	2	180.46
Oct 11 – 14, 2017	2017 JGP Italy	2	66.72	3	119.09	3	185.81
Nov 24 – 26, 2017	2017-18 Japan Championships (Junior)	6	57.89	1	135.57	1	193.46
Dec 7 – 10, 2017	(Japan) 2017-18 Junior Grand Prix Final	4	66.82	4	125.63	4	192.45
Dec 21 – 24, 2017	2017-18 Japan Championships (Senior)	5	66.74	2	141.29	3	208.03
Mar 5 – 11, 2018	(Bulgaria) 2018 World Junior Championships	4	63.74	9	111.51	8	175.25
