= The Legend of Pipi =

- Film poster
- Directed by: Julia Schoel; Birgit "Pollo" Uhlig
- Screenplay by: Julia Schoel
- Story by: Julia Schoel
- Produced by: Brooke Heishman; Zoe Martin-Parkinson
- Music by: Bryan Teoh; Ian Navarro Silver
- Release date: July 16, 2022 (YouTube)
- Running time: 8 minutes
- Country: United States

The Legend of Pipi is a 2022 animated short film and YouTube video created by Julia Schoel and directed by Schoel and Birgit "Pollo" Uhlig.

== Plot ==
A narration details the Cat Kingdom's princess has been captured by a beast. The story follows a "raggedy little cat" named Pipi on his quest to rescue the Cat Princess. Pipi embarks on the quest after being the only volunteer to answer the king's call for a rescuer. Along the journey, Pipi stumbles upon multiple princesses and defeats their captors, but ultimately leaves them to die as he realizes they are not the princess he is trying to save. Once Pipi reaches the Cat Kingdom's princess, she has already been killed. He mistakes her kidnapper (a dragon) for her, however, and takes the dragon back to the Cat Kingdom where it caused untold mayhem and destruction. During the credits, the Cat Kingdom knights were able to defeat and capture the dragon with help from Pipi after which they arrest him for bringing this unwanted terror in the first place. In a post-credit scene, the two are locked up in stocks.

== Production and release ==
Directed by Julia Schoel, The Legend of Pipi was developed as a Savannah College of Art and Design (SCAD) student thesis film. As such, the short was independently produced. The film's production process was tweeted throughout.

Pipi, a scraggly cat, was inspired by a character created for Schoel's Dungeons & Dragons campaign. Bryan Teoh and Ian Silver worked on the film's music and later, in April 2023, would release an extended original soundtrack.

The film was uploaded on July 16, 2022 onto the papajoolia YouTube channel. It was showcased at the 2022 SCAD AnimationFest in September. The film was also played at the 2023 SCAD Lacoste Film Festival, a showcase that highlighted works created and produced by SCAD students. Pipi was shown at the FIAF Animation First Festival 2023, where it earned a Special Mention.

== Reception ==
On YouTube, the film has received over 10 million views, as of April 2025. The film received positive reception from critics, who praised the short's humor and animation. Jade King of TheGamer commented positively on the film's "jovial tone", writing that "it's clear that Pipi is a labour of love" and calling it a "delightful animated short film with more charm and personality than most feature length tales can muster".

For his work on the film, Teoh was nominated in the "Score – Short Film (Animated)" category at the 2022 Hollywood Music in Media Awards.
