= Mark Savage (director) =

Australian film director (born 1962)

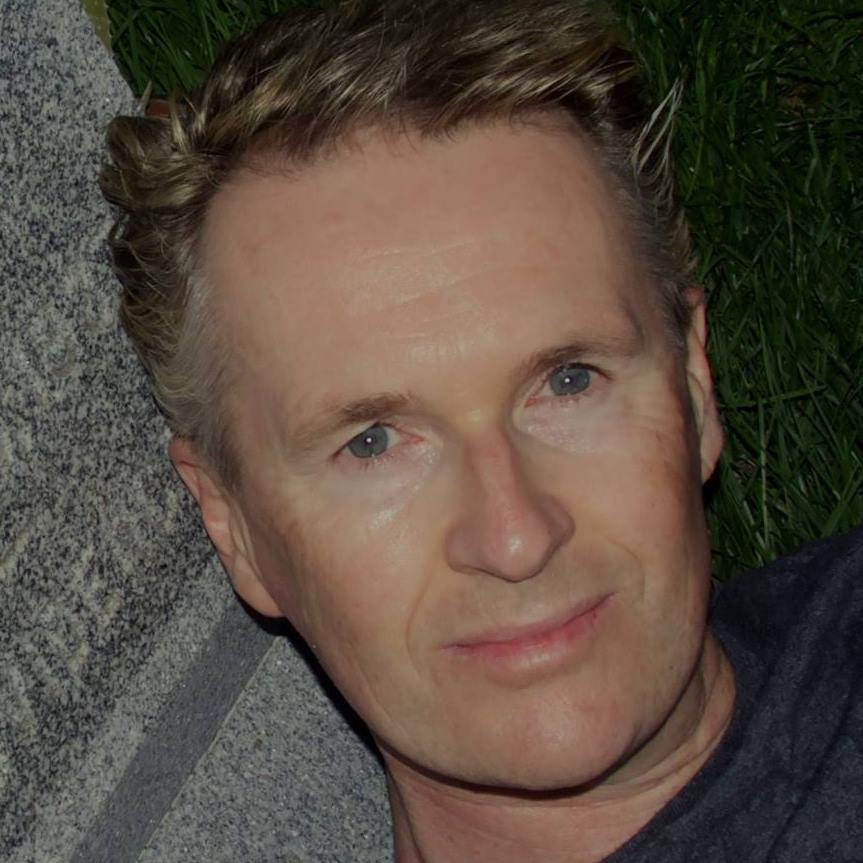
- Born: 17 September 1962 (age 64)
- Occupations: Director, writer, producer

Mark Savage (born 17 September 1962) is a US-based Australian film and television director, screenwriter, and film producer specializing in thrillers, horror, crime, cult, action and exploitation-themed films. He is influenced by European and Asian genre cinema, and has written critical reviews and articles for the Herald Sun, Asian Cult Cinema, Filmnet and Fatal Visions.

Savage wrote, produced and directed his first feature Marauders in 1986, since then genre entries have included Sensitive New Age Killer (2000), Trail of Passion (2003), Defenceless (2004), Kinderplay (2013), FertIsle (2015), Stressed To Kill (2016) and Purgatory Road (2017)

During 2017 and 2018 Purgatory Road was released in the United States and Australia and in 2019 on DVD and Blu-ray in Canada and America. In 2020 the movie was scheduled for showing in the UK and Ireland on channels including Virgin Media and Sky Store. The film was acclaimed in reviews and at the Melbourne Underground Film Festival, and the original score by Glen Gabriel received a Hollywood Music in Media Awards nomination.

In 2020 Painkiller was completed, starring Michael Paré and Bill Oberst Jr.

His movies Bring Him Back Dead, Hell's Coming For You and 12 to midnight released on Amazon Prime Video between 2022 and 2024.

In 2025 he directed Naked as Created: The Pastor Jim Moore Story for producer Tim Chizmar. In September and October he directed and produced Dead Down Under a Wake in Fright in Suburbia thriller, as well as Cult of Intimacy, the first official entry for the lesbian themed 'Little Sappho', a studio Savage founded with producer/actor Zara Majidpour to produce Yuri style ultra-soft core fairy tales in spectacular foreign locales. Then in November Savage directed the killer doll thriller Jeffrey Dollmer for producer Jeff Miller and a 2026 release.
