= A Beautiful Storm =

Music composition by Jennifer Thomas

A Beautiful Storm is a composition by Jennifer Thomas from her debut album Key of Sea (re-released as a special 10th edition in 2017) which was used during 2018 in the ISU Grand Prix of Figure Skating gold medal winning programmes by Rika Kihira from Japan.

Following this a partnership was established with the major Japanese Avex Entertainment group to promote the song and her album "Key of Sea 10th edition".

== Reviews ==
- Mormon Music
- Mainly Piano

== Albums ==
- The Fire Within (2018)
- Key of Sea (10 Year Special Edition) (2017)
- Winter Symphony (2015)
- Illumination (2012)
- The Lullaby Album, Vols 1 & 2 (2009)
- Key of Sea (2007)
