= Marauders (1986 film) =

- Directed by: Mark Savage
- Written by: Mark Savage
- Produced by: Mark Savage
- Starring: Colin Savage; Zero Montana
- Production company: The Magic Men
- Release date: 1986
- Running time: 76 mins
- Country: Australia
- Language: English

Marauders is a 1986 Australian film about two youths roaming the countryside and committing violence. It was privately funded, and was Mark Savage's first feature.
