= Jennifer Thomas (pianist) =

American musician (born 1977)

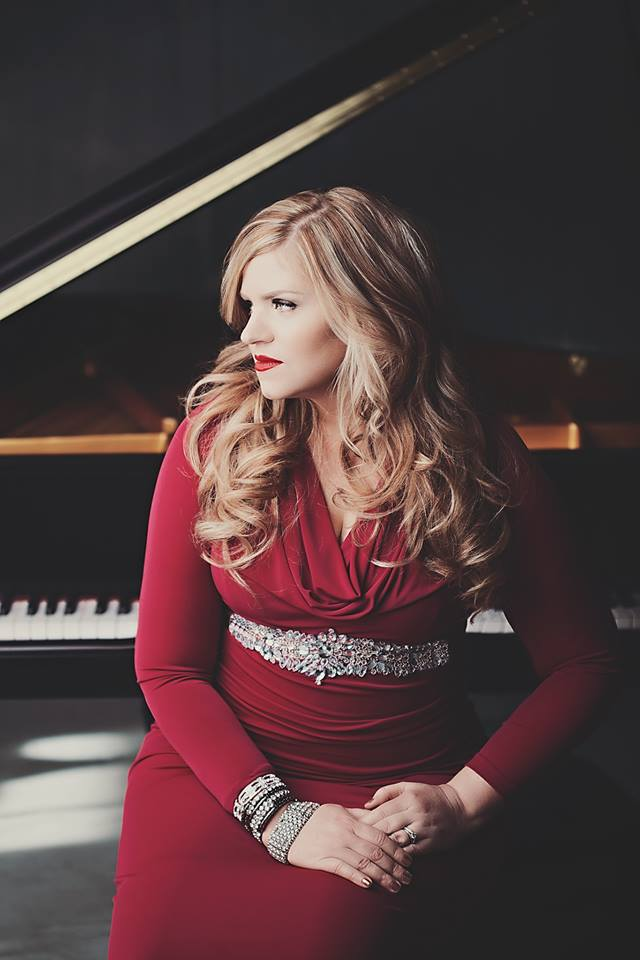

Background information
- Born: 1977 (age 48–49)
- Origin: Seattle, Washington
- Genres: Classical, crossover, new-age.
- Instruments: Piano, violin
- Labels: Tickled Ivory Music (Independent), Avex Entertainment (Japan)
- Website: www.jenniferthomasmusic.com

Jennifer Thomas (born 1977) is an American pianist, violinist, composer, performing artist, and recording artist. She was classically trained starting at the age of 5 and began composing in 2003, later releasing her debut album in 2007.

Thomas has issued nine albums, Oceans, was released in June 2024 and debuted at number 3 in the Billboard Classical Crossover music charts. Her 2018 album The Fire Within also debuted at number 3 in the Billboard Classical music charts, number 2 in their Classical Crossover music charts, and number 25 in the Top Heatseekers. Thomas released her new cinematic orchestral album titled Game of Shadows on August 7, 2026 inspired by the spy, heist, and crime thriller movie genre.

Several of her original compositions and arrangements have been used in routines by International Skating Union Ice skaters at the 2022 Winter Olympics and by 2020 Summer Olympics gymnasts.

Thomas's YouTube video recordings have achieved a total of 20 million views, with over 5 million viewing a live concert performance of her arrangement of "Carol of the Bells" from her 2015 Christmas album, Winter Symphony. This performance was in December 2015 at Benaroya Hall in Seattle, with the Ensign Symphony & Chorus.

== Early life ==
Thomas grew up near Seattle, Washington. She got her first toy piano at the age of 3 and began formal lessons on both the piano and violin at the age of 5, under the tutelage of her mother, Carolyn Southworth. Her brothers also learned piano, violin, and cello from their mother. Jennifer and her older brother played in grade school orchestras, with Southworth as a conductor's assistant. Thomas continued to train classically and was involved in many recitals and piano adjudications through her teen years. She played with various youth orchestras and high school orchestras. She performed at her high school graduation and later went to Brigham Young University–Idaho.

At Brigham Young University–Idaho, Thomas studied piano under Professor Stephen Allen. She was a member of the university's Piano Ensemble group and accompanied the college choir and many vocal/instrumental students as well as playing violin in the university symphony. Thomas also competed in the university's Concerto Competition, where she took second place performing the Piano Concerto No. 3 (Prokofiev).

After college graduation, Thomas moved to Salt Lake City, Utah, where she was a regular performer with the Temple Square Concert Series and played violin in the Murray Symphony orchestra. While performing with the Murray Symphony, Thomas was a featured soloist on the Edward MacDowell Piano Concerto No. 2. She eventually moved to the Pacific Northwest, where she performed as a violinist with the Oregon Pro Arte Chamber Orchestra and worked for the Seattle Symphony in the Education Department. It was during her time working for the Seattle Symphony when she started composing her own original music.

== Career ==
Thomas is known for writing and performing piano-centered orchestral music from classical music to crossover music and cinematic orchestral epic music. While most of her works are original, she also covers classical pieces as well as pop music and movie soundtracks. Thomas has also composed film scores. She won the Gold Medal of Excellence in the 2011 Park City Film Music Festival for "Music in a Short Film" as well as a 2012 Hollywood Music in Media Award for "Best Film Score for Documentary/Short".

Thomas' third album, Illumination, won "Album of the Year" and "Artist of the Year" at the 2013 IMC Awards. In October 2015, Illumination also won the "Classical Song of the Year" International Music and Entertainment Association Award, and the Enlightened Piano Radio Award for "Best piano album with instrumentation" at Carnegie Hall New York City – where she performed live at the awards ceremony.

Winter Symphony, Thomas' fourth album was released in November 2015. Mixed by five time Grammy Award winner Brian Vibberts, contributors included Glen Gabriel, Ricky Kej and Taylor Davis (violinist). Following the album release, Thomas performed concerts at Salt Lake City, Atascocita, Texas and the Benaroya Hall Seattle. The album has received many favorable reviews and during 2016 won several prestigious awards.

In March 2017, Thomas arranged an orchestral cover of the Beauty and the Beast (Disney song) featuring cellist Armen Ksajikian to coincide with the release of the Walt Disney Pictures and Mandeville Films movie Beauty and the Beast (2017 film).
During July 2017, Thomas collaborated with poet J.ournal to produce a double award-winning track and video Nine Twelve, a powerful 9/11 reminder message, October 2017 saw a 10-year special re-mastered edition of her 2007 album Key of Sea.

On 12 October 2018, Thomas widely released a Billboard charting classical/cinematic music styled album titled The Fire Within which she previewed live in concert at Benaroya Hall in Seattle. During the winter of 2018, a composition by Thomas, A Beautiful Storm, was used in ISU Grand Prix of Figure Skating gold medal programmes by Rika Kihira from Japan. Following this a partnership was established with Avex Entertainment to promote her album Key of Sea in Japan

Commencing June 19, 2019, Thomas embarked on a well-received summer concert tour of the western United States. During 2019, more ice skating recognition of her music continued when her composition "Illumination" was performed to in a free skate program by American Alysa Liu to win the ISU Junior Grand Prix in the United States. Liu retained the title in 2020 skating to the same composition. 2020 also saw Cha Jun-hwan win the South Korean figure skating championships performing to the Thomas and Kimberly StarKey composition The Fire Within.

In March 2021, Thomas's music was performed in the 2021 World Figure Skating Championships by Rika Kihira, Cha Jun-hwan and Alexandra Feigin and in April by Rika Kihira for the ISU World Team Trophy in Figure Skating.

The 2020 Summer Olympics, held in Tokyo, Japan July 2021, saw her original composition Winter Symphony performed by Russian Olympic Committee gold medallist gymnast Vladislava Urazova and her arrangement of Tchaikovsky's Dance of the Sugar Plum Fairy used in a routine by 21st placed finalist gymnast Lee Yun-seo from South Korea. At the 2022 Winter Olympics held in Beijing China, Karen Chen representing Team USA (who won a silver medal) skated to a Jennifer Thomas, Escala (group) and Hugo Choinard mix of "Requiem for a Tower" and "Requiem for a Dream", composed by Clint Mansell.

In December 2023, Thomas released her 7th album 'Classical Reimagined Vo1 1' featuring her own piano arrangements of classical works. After four years working on the special project on 7 June 2024, she released a new award-winning album 'Oceans' and appeared on the cover of Crossover Music Magazine Vol.35. In 2025 the album won 3 categories in the Inter Continental Music Awards.

Thomas's 'Rise of the Phoenix' was performed at the 2026 Winter Olympics by Utana Yoshida and Masaya Morita, which led to Japan winning a silver medal in the figure skating team event.

In July 2026 Thomas released a new instrumental 'Exit Strategy' a track her album 'Game of Shadows' recorded at Abbey Road Studios, which was nominated for the Hollywood Independent Music Awards

== Personal life ==
Thomas is married to Will Thomas, an ultra-marathon competitor who, in 2015, competed in the 106-mile race Ultra-Trail du Mont-Blanc in France. Together, they have three children and reside in the Washington area.

Thomas has traced her heritage through her maiden name of Southworth, and on 28 March 2023 she visited Samlesbury Hall, Lancashire, England, which was built by Gilbert de Southworth (b. 1270). She was bestowed with honorary membership of the hall.

== Discography ==
=== Albums ===
Year	Album
2026	Game of Shadows
2024	Oceans
2023	Classical Reimagined, Vol. 1
2018	The Fire Within - featuring Tina Guo
2017	Key of Sea (10 Year Special Edition)
2015	Winter Symphony
2012	Illumination (2012)
2009	The Lullaby Album, Vols 1 & 2
2007	Key of Sea (2007)

All Music

Thomas also features on the following albums;

2023	"Nine Twelve" - from the album Poems and Music Vol 1 by J.ournel.
2022	Epic Women - The Shero's Journey
2020	Love is - from the album 'Between Worlds' by Felica Fererri.
2020	Father Can You Hear Me - from the album 'Fearless' by Alexa Ray and Randall Jermaine.
2018	Spring of Fire – 92 Keys – Life and Death
2017	Sounds Of Christmas (MPi 2017 Edition)
2015	Merry Christmas – Viktoria Tocca
2015	Dream It – Viktoria Tocca
2015	Love Language album (Grammy nomination 2015) – Wouter Kellerman 'Turning Page' piano Jennifer Thomas.
2014	These Miles – Jonathan Estabrooks
2014	Roads: The Many Miles Music Artists (2014) – Into the Forest
2009	The Best of Relaxation: A Lifescapes Music Collection - Playing Viola
2007	Best of the Swan Lake: 2007 Moving Image & Music Award – Fly Away, Release, The Tempest

Discogs

== Awards and nominations ==
Year	Category	Work	Result	Ref
2026	Hollywood Independent Music Awards	Exit Strategy	Nomination	
2025	InterContinental Music Awards	Classical Crossover - 'Oceans' album and production, also for' You Carried Me Home'	Winners	
2024	Cannes Independent Shorts	Best Music Video	Winner	
2024	Hollywood Independent Music Awards	Underwater Carnival Ride from the album Oceans	Won	
2023	Prague International Sound Video Awards	Etude for the Dreamer	Won	
2022	Hollywood Music in Media Awards	The Adventurer - Epic/Orchestral	Nominated	
2020	Classical Song of the Year International Music and Entertainment Awards	The Fire Within	Won	
2020	Music Video of the Year International Music and Entertainment Awards	The Fire Within	Nominated	
2019	Best Instrumental Music Video The Indie Gathering International Festival	The Fire Within	Won	
2019	Best Music Video Silicon Beach Film Festival	The Fire Within	Won	
2019	Contemporary Classical/Instrumental Hollywood Music in Media Awards	Glorious	Nominatated	
2019	Best Classical/Opera/A Cappella Peace Song Awards	Glorious	Nominatated	
2019	Best Music Video Peace Song Awards	The Fire Within	Nominatated	
2018	Producer/Production (with Glen Gabriel) Hollywood Music in Media Awards	The Fire Within	Nominatated	
2018	Classical Artist of the Year – IMEA Awards	Key of Sea (10 Year Special Edition)	Nominated	
2018	Classical Album of the Year – IMEA Awards	Key of Sea (10 Year Special Edition)	Nominated	
2018	Music Video of the Year – IMEA Awards	A Beautiful Storm	Nominated	
2018	Best Spoken Word – Roundglass Music Awards	Nine Twelve (with J.ournal)	Won	
2017	Best Message Song/Social Impact – Music Genre Hollywood Music in Media Awards	Nine Twelve (with J.ournal)	Won	
2017	Best Independent Music Video – Music In Visual Media Hollywood Music in Media Awards	Nine Twelve (with J.ournal)	Nominated	
2017	Best Original Score – Short Film – Music In Visual Media Hollywood Music in Media Awards	Desert Rose	Nominated	
2017	Best Music Video – Global Peace Song Awards	Alleluia	Won – Jury Vote	
2016	Holiday Album of the Year – International Music and Entertainment Assoc Awards	Winter Symphony	Won	
2016	Classical Artist of the Year – International Music and Entertainment Assoc Awards	Winter Symphony	Nominated	
2016	Classical Song of the Year – International Music and Entertainment Assoc Awards	Winter Symphony	Won	
2016	Music Video of the Year – International Music and Entertainment Assoc Awards	Carol of the Bells	Nominated	
2016	Global Peace Song Awards – Opera/Classical	Eventide	Won – Public Vote	
2016	Global Peace Song Awards – A Cappella/Choral	Alleluia	Won – Jury Vote	
2016	Best Music Video – Utah Music Awards	Carol of the Bells	Nominated	
2016	Best Cinematography in a Music Video – Utah Music Awards	Carol of the Bells (cinematographer Tel Stewart)	Won	
2016	Best Original Instrumental Song – Utah Music Awards	Winter Symphony (Jennifer Thomas album)	Nominated	
2016	Best in Holiday Genre – Hollywood Music in Media Awards 2016	Winter Symphony	Won	
2016	Best LIVE Classical Performance (Live at Benaroya Hall) – Indie Music Channel Awards 2016	Winter Symphony	Won	
2016	Music Video of the Year Award (Alleluia) – Indie Music Channel Awards 2016	Winter Symphony	Won	
2016	Best Classical Music Video (Over $5,000) – Alleluia – Indie Music Channel Awards 2016	Winter Symphony	Won	
2016	Best Female Classical Artist – Indie Music Channel Awards 2016	Winter Symphony	Nominated	
2016	Best Classical Song – Indie Music Channel Awards 2016	Winter Symphony	Nominated	
2016	Holiday Album of the Year – Enlightened Piano Radio Awards	Winter Symphony	Nominated	
2016	Global Music Awards 2016	Winter Symphony	Silver Medal	
2016	Album of the Year – Top 20 of 2015 Music Critic Michael Debbage	Winter Symphony	Won	
2015	Classical Song of the Year – International Music and Entertainment Awards	Illumination	Won	
2015	Best Orchestral Piano Album – Enlightened Piano Radio Awards	Illumination	Won	
2013	Album of the Year – Indie Music Channel Awards	Illumination	Won	
2013	Artist of the Year – Indie Music Channel Awards	Illumination	Won	
2013	Best Soundtrack Artist – Indie Music Channel Awards	Illumination	Won	
2013	Best Classical Artist – Indie Music Channel Awards	Illumination	Won	
2013	Best Neo-Classical Album – Zone Music Reporter Awards	Illumination	Nominated	
2012	Top Female Artist of the Year – Classical Crossover UK	Illumination	Won	
2012	The Indie Award – Classical Crossover UK	Illumination	Won	
2012	Best Original Score – Hollywood Music in Media Awards	Minuet	Won	
2012	Best Contemporary/Orchestral Song – Hollywood Music in Media Awards	Illumination	Nominated	
2012	Piano Heaven UK	Illumination	Won	
2012	Best Classical Song – Hollywood Music in Media Awards	Moonlight	Nominated	
2011	Best Classical Song – Hollywood Music in Media Awards	Toccata and Fugue (Illumination)	Nominated	
2011	Gold Medal of Excellence – Park City Film Music Festival	Minuet	Won	
2008	Swan Lake Music and Motion Picture Awards – Audience Vote Award	Fly Away	Won	
2007	Swan Lake Music and Motion Picture Awards – Digital Film	Release	Won	

== Film and Televised ice skating and gymnastics events coverage ==
- 2026 Team Japan 2026 Winter Olympics - Rise of the Phoenix, performed by Utana Yoshida and Masaya Morita.
- 2022 Team USA Figure skating at the 2022 Winter Olympics - 'Requiem for a Tower' and 'Requiem for a Dream', mix, performed by Karen Chen.
- 2021 2020 Summer Olympics Gymnastics - Two works performed, Winter Symphony performed by Vladislava Urazova and her arrangement of Tchaikovsky's Dance of the Sugar Plum Fairy by Lee Yun-seo
- 2021 ISU World Team Trophy in Figure Skating 'The Fire Within' performed by Rika Kihira.
- 2021 2021 World Figure Skating Championships - Two works performed, 'The Fire Within' by Rika Kihira and Cha Jun-hwan, 'Moonlight' by Alexandra Feigin.
- 2020 South Korean Figure Skating Championships Senior gold medal won by Cha Jun-hwan to the program of an original Thomas composition The Fire Within (Jennifer Thomas album).
- 2020 US Figure Skating Championships gold medal won by Alysa Liu to the program of New World Symphony from the album Illumination composed by Thomas
- 2019 2019 ISU Jr Grand Prix Final figure skating gold medal won by Alysa Liu to the program of New World Symphony from the album Illumination composed by Thomas
- 2018 2018 NHK Trophy Grand Prix figure skating gold medal won by Rika Kihira to the program of A Beautiful Storm composed by Thomas
- 2017 Film Score "Desert Rose"
- 2015 U.S. Figure Skating Championships, Hannah Miller, Short program
- 2014 ISU Junior Grand Prix, Zagreb, Karen Chen
- 2013 International Skating Union, Angela Wang JGP Baltic Cup Junior Ladies Short program
- 2013 "Running the Edge", directed by Matt Trappe, song placements
- 2011 Film score "Minuet", directed and written by Ryan K. McNeal, score by Jennifer Thomas
- 2012 National Basketball Association Sports placements
- 2012 NBC Universal Sports placements
- 2014 MGM Equal Justice (TV series) placements
- 2008 "Reasons", Poor Boyz Productions
