= Winter Symphony (album) =

Studio album by Jennifer Thomas
- Released: November 20, 2015
- Genre: Classical
- Length: 54:24
- Label: Tickled Ivory Music
- Producer: Jennifer Thomas and Glen Gabriel

Winter Symphony is the fourth album release from Jennifer Thomas, and her first Christmas album. The music was written and/or arranged by Thomas, with orchestrations by Glen Gabriel. Thomas performs on both piano and violin throughout. Also featured on the album is The Ensign Chorus, Felicia Farerre, Taylor Davis, and players from The Salt Lake Pops Orchestra, The Utah Symphony, and the Chochin Chamber Orchestra. The album encompasses many traditional Christmas favorites, two new originals by Thomas, as well as some film score covers. Mixed by Brian Vibberts, contributors included Ricky Kej and Taylor Davis

== Track listing ==
No.	Title	Length
1.	"Angels We Have Heard On High" (featuring The Ensign Chorus)	5:17
2.	"Dance of the Sugar Plum Fairy"	3:31
3.	"Carol of the Bells"	4:37
4.	"Alleluia" (featuring Felicia Farerre and The Ensign Chorus)	6:16
5.	"Ice Dance" (featuring The Ensign Chorus)	4:41
6.	"I Saw Three Ships"	2:48
7.	"Breath of Heaven"	5:24
8.	"Theme from Home Alone (Somewhere in My Memory)"	5:05
9.	"What Child Is This" (featuring Taylor Davis)	4:07
10.	"Silent Night" (featuring The Ensign Chorus)	4:49
11.	"Winter Symphony"	3:35
12.	"O Holy Night"	6:14

== Credits ==
- Jennifer Thomas – producer, songwriter, arranger
- Glen Gabriel – producer, orchestration
- Brian Vibberts – orchestration
- Christofer Stannow – mastering
