= Nikkole =

American singer-songwriter

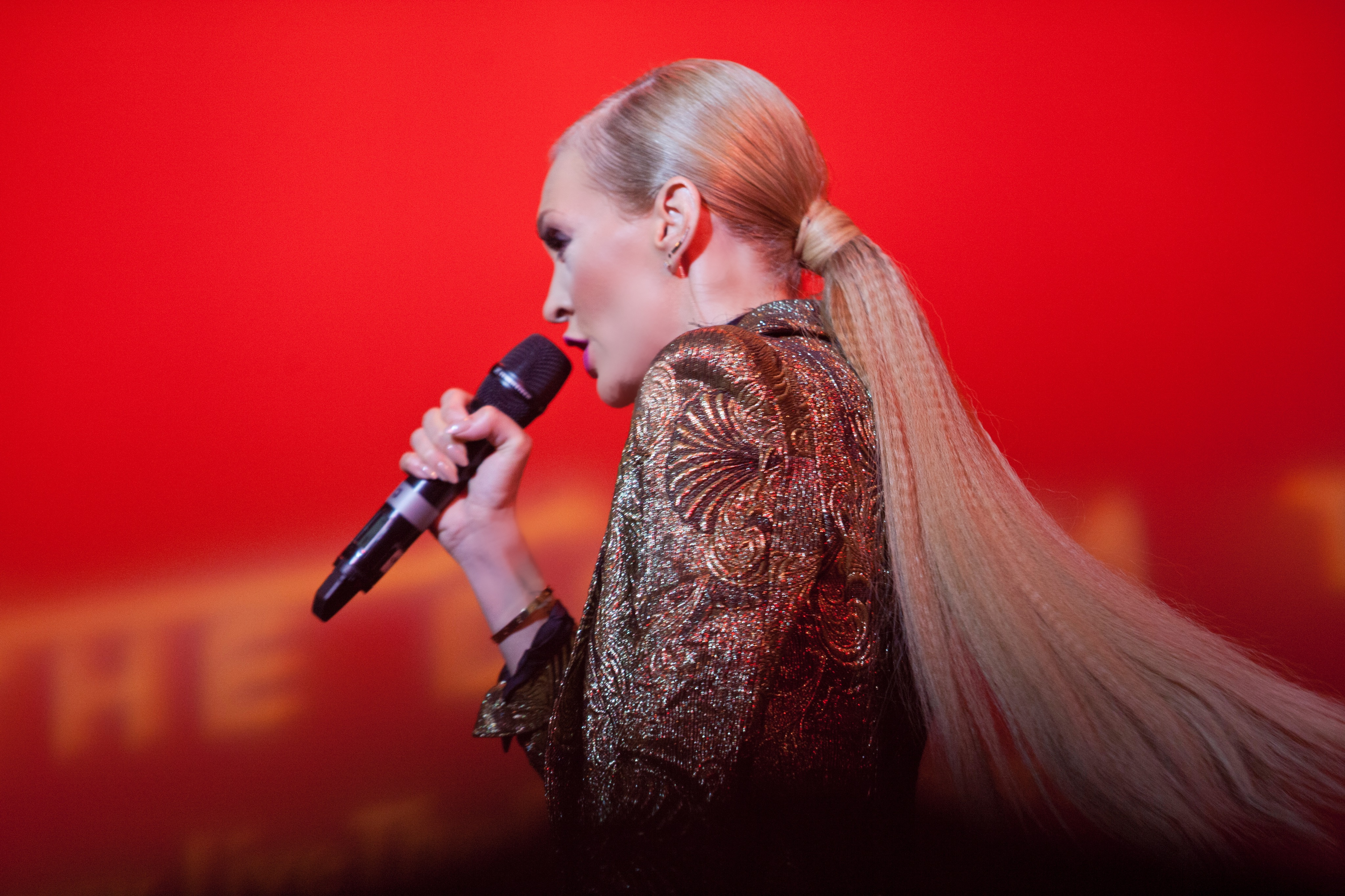
- Nikkole Live in Concert at The Live The Dream Tour Gala Concert

Background information
- Born: Nikkole Hall; July 12, 1980 (age 45); Ahoskie, NC, United States
- Origin: Los Angeles, California, United States
- Genres: R&B; Pop; Dance
- Occupations: Singer, songwriter

Nikkole Hall (born July 12, 1980), better known by her stage name Nikkole, is a Creole-American singer and songwriter. She is known for her Billboard charting hit songs "Zero" and "Gonna Get It Right" from her 4th studio album Hallucinations (2014). The songs have peaked on the Dance Club Songs chart at #7 and #20 respectively. She is a featured artist on the song "You Keep Lifting Me Higher" from Norman Brown's album Stay With Me (2007) that has reached #1 on the Billboard Heatseeker Albums, Jazz Albums charts and also peaked at #11 on the Billboard Top R&B/ Hip-Hop Albums Chart and at #107 on the Billboard 200. Nikkole has also been featured in the top 10 of Cosmopolitan Magazine's search for the Next Female Rock Star in 2008. In 2022, Nikkole signed on as co-host of The Vantage Point, a radio talkshow on Soul Cafe Radio of the NorthStar Radio Group.

== Music career ==
Nikkole's debut album Appearances was released on January 9, 2001. The album was funded in part by her career as a model at the time and background vocal stints for various artists. This was followed up with A Girl Like Me on October 11, 2005. In 2007 Nikkole was a featured vocalist and co-writer on the song “You Keep Lifting Me Higher” from Norman Brown’s album Stay With Me. The album reached #1 on the Billboard Heatseeker Albums, Jazz Albums charts and also peaked at #11 on the Billboard Top R&B/ Hip-Hop Albums Chart and at #107 on the Billboard 200. On August 12, 2008 Nikkole released her third album Creolepatra. She was chosen as one of the semi-finalists of America’s Top 10 Fearless Female Rockstars by Cosmopolitan Magazine in a StarLaunch Search in 2008. The title was eventually won by Mieka Pauley. She also collaborated with Arturo Sandoval on a single entitled "Amazing" in 2011.

After having spent over a decade toiling in relative obscurity, Nikkole's breakthrough came with her fourth album Hallucinations released on July 15, 2014. The first two singles, "Zero" and "Gonna Get It Right" reached #7 and #20 respectively on the Billboard Dance Club Songs chart. The songs were accompanied by music videos, both of which were directed by Ethan Lader. The album was produced by British producer Derek Bramble and had a more pop influenced sound compared to her previous releases that were more R&B influenced. In 2015, the music was nominated for 4 International Music and Entertainment Association (IMEA) Awards, and went on to win 2 of the Awards for Pop Artist of the Year and Pop Song of the Year. In the same year, the music was also nominated for 2 Awards at the Hollywood Music in Media Awards (HMMA). In 2016, Nikkole was nominated for an award at the 16th Annual Native American Music Awards (NAMA).

In 2019, Legendary Producer Leon Sylvers III started producing and writing with Nikkole on her fifth album, "Vulnerable", which was released on November 5, 2021.

The album, "Vulnerable" by Nikkole was selected as the #1 R&B album of 2022 by Goldmine Magazine's Top 10 Soul and R&B albums of the year.

Nikkole has cited Aretha Franklin, Natalie Cole, Mariah Carey and Whitney Houston as her early influences growing up.

== Awards ==
Year	Recipient	Nominated work	Award	Result	Ref.
2015	Nikkole	NA	IMEA Award for Pop Entertainer of the Year	Nominated	
2015	Nikkole	NA	IMEA Award for Pop Artist of the Year	Won	
2015	Ethan Lader	Nikkole - Zero	IMEA Award for Music Video of the Year	Nominated	
2015	Derek Bramble / Jeanette Olsson / Nikkole Hall	Nikkole - Zero	IMEA Award for Pop Song of the Year	Won	
2015	Ethan Lader	Nikkole - Zero	HMMA Award for Independent Music Video	Nominated	
2015	Nikkole	Nikkole - Zero	HMMA Award for Music Genre (Pop)	Nominated	
2016	Nikkole	Nikkole - Hallucinations	NAMA Award for Best Pop Recording	Nominated	
2022	Nikkole	Nikkole - All Mine	HMMA Award for Best Original Recording	Nominated	
2022	Nikkole feat. Leon Sylvers IV	Nikkole feat. Leon Sylvers IV - We Can Make It If We Try	HMMA Award for Best Music Video	Nominated	
2023	Nikkole	NA	People's Choice Award - Soul Cafe Radio	Nominated	

== Discography ==
=== Notable singles ===
- "Gonna Get It Right" (2014)
- "Zero" (2014)

=== Studio albums ===
Title	Album details	Role	Release date	Label
Appearances	Solo	Primary Artist	January 9, 2001	SE Entertainment Records
A Girl Like Me	Solo	Primary Artist	October 11, 2005	SE Entertainment Records
Creolepatra	Solo	Primary Artist	August 12, 2008	SE Entertainment Records
Hallucinations	Solo	Primary Artist	July 15, 2014	Global Infinity Records
Vulnerable	Solo	Primary Artist	November 5, 2021	LA International Records
