= SEAY =

American singer

- Portrait of SEAY, 2010

Background information
- Origin: Charlottesville, U.S.
- Genre: New-age
- Occupation: Vocalist Composer
- Years active: 2005–present
- Label: www.tuscansunmusic.com
- Website: www.seayinthegarden.com

SEAY (pronounced "sea", born Melissa Seay Harshaw) is an American award-winning New-age music artist and humanitarian who has gained prominence as both a vocalist and composer. She has released multiple recordings, many of which have received awards and nominations. Her 2016 release In the Garden featuring collaborations with Grammy Award winners Ricky Kej and Wouter Kellerman charted on the Billboard New Age albums chart for five weeks peaking at #3 and won the Zone Music Reporter best vocal album of the year.

Her 2018 album A Winter Blessing the Gift was engineered by Jeff Silverman (producer) and Grammy Award winners Brian Vibberts, Ricky Kej, and P. A. Deepak. From that album for Christmas 2019, two singles, Father Christmas Eyes and On This Starry Night were also released.

During 2021 Seay vocalised on the Wouter Kellerman and David Arkenstone album 'Pageaea', which has been nominated for Best New Age album at the 2022 Grammy Awards. In 2022 she won an InterContinental Music Award with Best of Pangaea “Beautiful Earth” – New Age. 2023/2024 has seen nine awards achieved.

== Formative years ==
With classical music training in both voice and music, Seay's formative years were spent playing piano, studying voice and traveling with her family throughout the Far East while her father, an Army physician, finished his medical residency. Her great aunt was the celebrated American operatic mezzo-soprano Margaret Harshaw, who performed for 22 seasons with the Metropolitan Opera. She later attended the Sotheby's Institute of Art in London with graduate studies in Decorative Art. It was while living in England and returning to her family's English roots, her music journey began singing on projects for song publishers Carlin, Motown, Warner Chappell Music, artists Elaine Paige and Annie Lennox and performing in London's music scene.

== Albums ==
- 2024 1 Voice XX1V
- 2018 A Winter Blessing the Gift
- 2016 In the Garden
- 2007 A Winter Blessing: Songs for the Season
- 2006 1 Voice [Special Edition]
- 2005 1 Voice

=== Extended play ===
- 2015 Love is the Ocean

=== Singles ===
- 2023 Dream (Remastered)
- 2023 In Dreaming ft Jeff Silverman /
- 2021 Dream (immersive single ep and video)
- 2019 "A Winter Blessing The Gift - The Singles"
- 2018 "On This Starry Night"
- 2011 "I Will Love You Still"
- 2009 "A Christmas Heart"
- 2009 "All Around The World"

=== Compilation album ===
- 2023 Sweet Dreams Siren Song.
- 2022 The 64th FYC album (Various Artists) and review of Seay's 'Dream'
- 2019/2020 A Better Life, Mindful Music Association.
- 2018 Let's Have a Rockin' Christmas, Vol 3 - Various Artists.

All Music: CD Baby:

=== Collaborations ===
- 2025 "Gandhi- Mantras of Compassion" by Ricky Kej.
- 2025 "2 Unite All" A benefit album from all star musicians for healing and peace in Gaza and the Middle East.
- 2023 Spread Hope Send Love Around the World. The Power Of One Movement.
- 2023 Mystic Voyager Album by Peter Sterling.
- 2021 Pangaea
- 2019 Song from M.A.S.H
- 2019 The Definitive Collection Ricky Kej album, Song Love Divine Patti Austin vocals, SEAY vocals.
- 2018 Through The Vortex: The Sedona Effect - Bruce Lev
- 2017 One Earth Epic Trailer Music by Ricky Kej SEAY vocals.
- 2017 Divinity Earth Love album by Ricky Kej SEAY vocals.
- 2017 Sounds from the Circle IX
- 2017 Particles in Space by Merrill Collins Armand Hutton, Brian Scanlon Maksim Velichkin & Laura Halladay
- 2015 Shanti Samsara Ricky Kej CD
  - CD1 Shanti Amitabh Bachchan Frances Fisher Rosanna Arquette Lindsay Wagner
  - CD1 Kudrat - Hariharan Raveolution String Section
  - CD2 Love Divine - Patti Austin Wouter Kellerman
- 2015 Proyog: From yoga's birthplace -Ricky Kej
- 2013 Breath of Heaven - Stephen Peppos
- 2009 Sounds from the Circle 1

== Filmography ==
- 2007 Gracie: The Diary of a Coma Patient

== Awards and nominations ==
- 2025 - Hollywood Independent Music Awards Nomination - "Love Is The Ocean (XXIV)" Mixing/Engineering
- 2025 - World Entertainment Awards -2025 Winner "Love Is the Ocean XXIV"
- 2025 - New Age Notes Radio Music Awards NOMINEES 2025 - Best New Age Vocal Album - “1 Voice XXIV” (Album)
- 2024 - Hollywood Independent Music Awards Nomination - Nara - Producer/Production.
- 2024 - One Earth Awards - 3 gold medals music and film, "We Are One" "Dream Illumination" "On This Starry Night".
- 2024 - New Age Notes Radio Music awards - 5 nominations.
- 2023 - Hollywood Independent Music Awards, In Dreaming, Seay and Jeff Silverman.
- 2022 - InterContinental Music Award, Winner, Best of Pangaea “Beautiful Earth” – New Age.
- 2021 - Covr Award finalists - 1 Voice (album) and This Starry Night (music video).
- 2020 - Textura.org - New Age Number 1 A Better Life, compilation album featuring Heaven's Gate by Seay.
- 2020 - Peace Song Awards, 3 category nominations, including winning the Social Media Reach award with Heaven's Gate
- 2020 - Hollywood Music in Media Awards Nominee New-age music/Ambient music Heaven's Gate
- 2020 - COVR Visionary Award Winner In the Garden album
- 2019 - Hollywood Music in Media Awards Nominee-Best Holiday song -"Father Christmas eyes"
- 2019 - Global Music Awards -Silver Medal - Winter Blessing the Gift, album and female vocalist
- 2019 - Global Music Awards- Top albums
- 2019 - Clouzine International Music Awards
- 2018 - Mainly Piano - Michael Debbage top 5 - Winter Blessing the Gift
- 2017 - Zone Music Reporter- Vocal Album of The Year winner - Top 100 Radio Awards - Seay In the Garden
- 2017 - Global Peace Song Awards winner new age song - "We Are One"
- 2017 - Global Peace Song Awards winner social media - "We Are One"
- 2017 - Global Music Awards- Silver Medal "We Are One" new age pop and female vocalist
- 2017 - Hollywood Music in Media Awards Nominee - Seay and Geoff Koch - Hearts afire
- 2016 - Billboard Chart #3 Peak - New Age Albums - In the Garden
- 2016 - Zone Music Reporter Best Vocal Album - In the Garden
- 2016 - Global Music Awards- Silver Medal New Age Album - Seay In the Garden
- 2016 - Hollywood Music in Media Awards Nominee "We Are One" Best Ambient New Age Song
- 2016 - Mainly Piano - Michael Debbage top 2 - In the Garden
- 2011- Park City Film Music Festival - Gracie: The Diary of a Coma Patient (Film) - Musical Excellence in a Performance/Experimental Film

== Humanitarian events ==
Seay has been a part of humanitarian events which include the opening ceremonies of International Day of Peace and her song "All Around The World" was a featured theme for Project Peace on Earth's Love All Simulcast live from Bethlehem, Palestine on Christmas Day 2012, for which she is a musical ambassador, her vocal chant piece "Orion's Gate" is also on Project Peace on Earth's 2 Unite All Volumes 1 and 2 with 26 world artists including Peter Gabriel, Roger Waters, and Stewart Copeland, in support of The United Nations World Peace Initiatives. Vocal work includes participation on the world music project "Shanti Samsara" launching the 2015 United Nations Climate Change Conference in Paris produced by Ricky Kej. She is also a C.A.R.E channel artist, providing original instrumental music as a therapeutic tool for use in acute care hospitals, residential care facilities, hospices, palliative care units, cancer centres, children's hospitals, and rehabilitation.

In 2023 SEAY teamed up with US singer Amy McAllister (founder of The Power of One Movement) and 25 artists on her brainchild single Spread Hope Send Love Around the World to use music as healing for people all over the world who are suffering depression from the loss of a loved one.
