= Brian Vibberts =

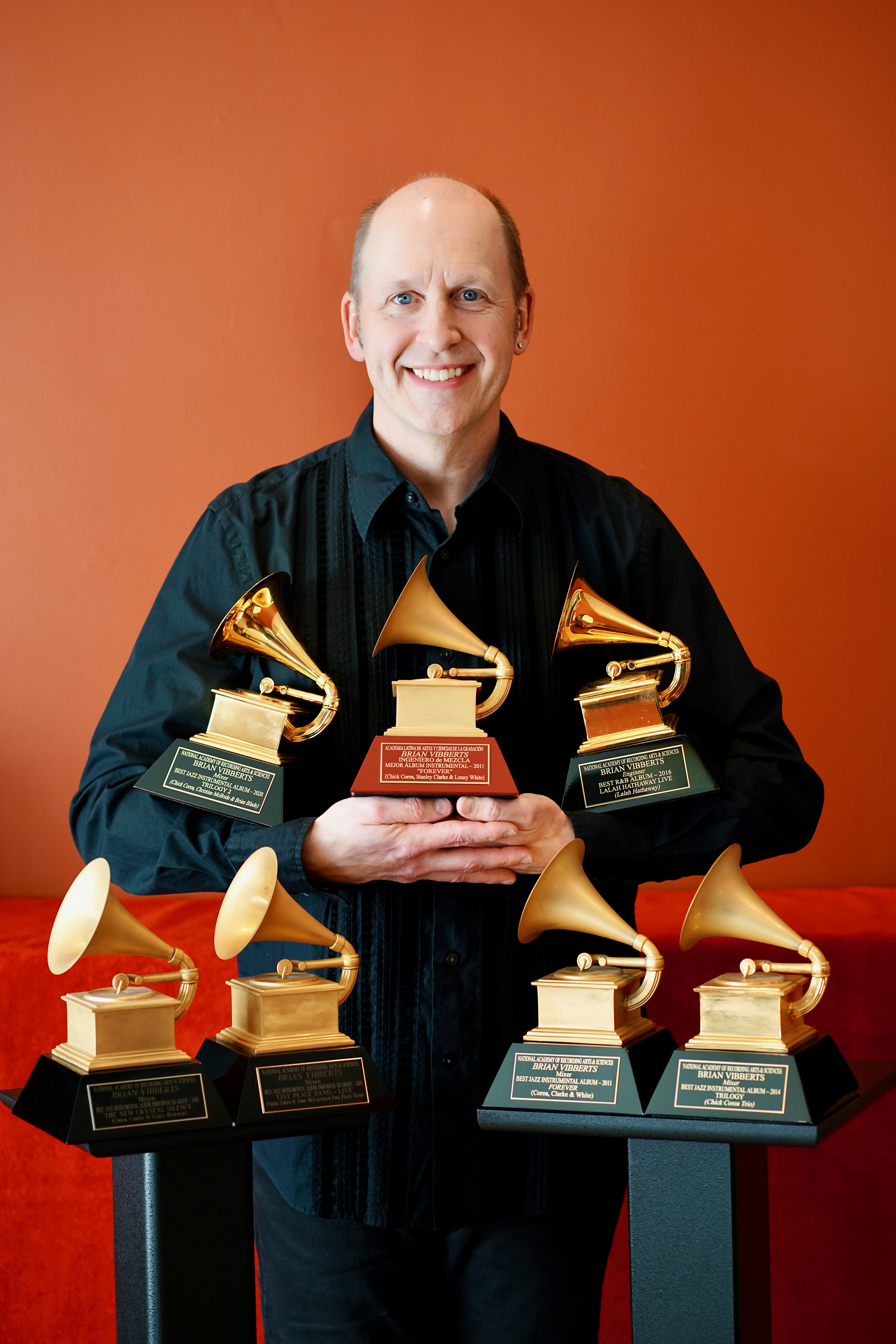
- Brian Vibberts with seven Grammy Awards

Background information
- Genres: Pop music, Rock music, Country music, Jazz, Film score, Orchestral, Stage (theatre) & Film, Musical theatre
- Occupations: Audio Engineer, Audio mixing (recorded music), Broadcasting Mixer, Record producer
- Years active: 1991–present
- Website: https://vibbertsmixing.com

Brian Vibberts is an American audio engineer, a native of Portland, Connecticut, who has been active since 1991. He is a 7-time Grammy Award winner (6x Grammy, 1 Latin Grammy) and has participated in the making of numerous albums that have resulted in Grammy Award nominations and winners. Also known by the nickname, "Dr Vibb," he has creatively recorded or mixed many multi-platinum artists in many genres, including Michael Jackson, Aerosmith, The Pussycat Dolls, Bon Jovi, Natasha Bedingfield, Green Day, Trace Adkins, Faith Hill, Toby Keith, Ice Cube, Boyz II Men, Elton John, Eric Clapton, Chick Corea, Brad Paisley, Ringo Starr, Mariah Carey and Tony Bennett.

== Early life ==
Vibberts started playing the drums at 8 years old, progressing to playing in a band as a teenager. While recording, he was more interested as to what was going on in the control room, and thereafter changed career direction.

== Career ==
After graduating from Portland High School (Connecticut) in 1986, Vibberts spent a year at University of Massachusetts Amherst studying astronomy before transferring to the music production and engineering program at Berklee College of Music in Boston. Upon graduation in 1991, he moved to New York City and began his career at Right Track Recording. It was there he started working with artists such as Mariah Carey, Living Colour, and the Brecker Brothers.

In 1993, he had an opportunity to work at the Hit Factory, to enhance his recording and mixing skills.

From 1993 to 1995, he worked with artists such as Paul Simon, Billy Joel, Celine Dion, Meat Loaf, David Lee Roth and Dave Matthews Band. He also spent an entire year with Michael Jackson working on the album HIStory, which brought his career and their friendship to new heights. Opportunities expanded his expertise from album work to the ability of recording and mixing full orchestras. He raised the bar in the audio engineering field by working with Shawn Murphy, Dan Wallin, John McClure, and Michael Farrow on film scores, Broadway cast albums and Disney Feature Animated films.

Vibberts continued fine-tuning his craft of recording and mixing by co-working with the engineers and producers that he admired. These experts like George Martin, Bruce Swedien, David Foster, Walter Afanasieff, Nile Rodgers, Al Schmitt, Tom Lord-Alge, Arif Mardin, Jimmy Jam, Terry Lewis, Tommy LiPuma and Trevor Rabin helped him accomplish studio work. Because of the work he achieved at the Hit Factory, he kept gaining the artists' and producers' respect, which led to more engineering jobs for Kathleen Battle, Heavy D, and additional recording sessions for Michael Jackson. During the three years of working at the Hit Factory, he did sessions with record executives Tommy Mottola, Clive Davis, Don Ienner, Ahmet Ertegun, and Dave Glew.

From 1995 to 2000, Vibberts was hired as a staff engineer at Sony Music Studios and continued his high standards of engineering when working on sessions with artists such as Tony Bennett, Mariah Carey, Sting, Garth Brooks, Lauryn Hill, Jewel, Bruce Springsteen, and producers such as Phil Ramone, Jack Douglas, and Daniel Lanois. One of the highlights of his career was mixing half of the Herbie Hancock album Gershwin's World, recommended by Bruce Swedien. The album won four out of the five Grammy Awards it was nominated for, including Jazz Album of the Year.

From 2000, Vibberts relocated to Los Angeles, where he was hired by Ocean Way Recording, and periodically worked with established producer and mixer Jack Joseph Puig until 2005. The move opened opportunities to work with Mick Jagger, Fiona Apple, Paul McCartney, Tim McGraw, Clint Black, Joss Stone, Counting Crows, Eartha Kitt and Bon Jovi.

In 2002, he worked on the 2002 MTV Icon Award for Aerosmith, with Pink, Shakira, Train, and Janet Jackson. Another project was working on the 2003 MTV Icon Award show for Metallica, with Avril Lavigne, Sum 41, Limp Bizkit, Korn, and Staind. Vibberts partnered with Effanel Music on these live shows:

Vibberts was a broadcast mixer for the Budweiser Made in America Festival in Los Angeles, NewNowNext Awards 2013, Tegan and Sara, Kesha, and VH1's Do Something Awards 2013, mixing Sara Bareilles. He also recorded the Justin Timberlake and Jay-Z Legends of the Summer Tour at the Rose Bowl Stadium where he partnered with Music Mix Mobile (which is a remote recording truck) for this recording.

From 2009 to the present day, Vibberts has been co-founder, producer and engineer at Spotlight 87 Entertainment.

== Technical discography credits ==
Selected credits;

- 1993 Billy Joel - River of Dreams
- 1993 Various - The Who's Tommy (original cast recording).
- 1993 Ryuichi Sakamoto - Little Buddha
- 1995 Michael Jackson - HIStory: Past, Present and Future, Book I
- 1995 Mariah Carey - Daydream
- 1997 Mychael Danna - Kama Sutra: A Tale of Love (Original Motion Picture Soundtrack)
- 1997 Alan Menken, David Zippel - Disney's Hercules (An Original Walt Disney Records Soundtrack)
- 1998 Michael Crawford - On Eagle's Wings
- 1998 Lauryn Hill - The Miseducation of Lauryn Hill
- 1998 Herbie Hancock - Gershwin's World
- 1999 Marc Anthony - Marc Anthony
- 1999 Savage Garden - Affirmation
- 2000 Boyz II Men - The Ballad Collection
- 2003 Stereophonics - You Gotta Go There To Come Back
- 2004 Marc Anthony - Valió la Pena
- 2004 Green Day - American Idiot
- 2005 Pussycat Dolls - PCD (album)
- 2006 Eric Clapton & JJ Cale - The Road to Escondido
- 2011 Chick Corea, Stanley Clarke and Lenny White - Forever
- 2013 Chick Corea Trio - Trilogy
- 2015 Chick Corea & Béla Fleck - Two
- 2015 Lalah Hathaway - Live
- 2015 Winter Symphony - Jennifer Thomas (pianist) album
- 2018 The Fire Within - Jennifer Thomas (pianist) album
- 2018 A Winter Blessing the Gift - SEAY

== Filmography ==
- 2008 Dead Space: Downfall (Video) (score mixer)
- 2003 Jeepers Creepers 2 (additional score recordist)
- 1997 Hercules (music recording assistant)
- 1996 Kama Sutra: A Tale of Love (assistant sound engineer)

IMDb;

== Grammy Awards ==
- 2015 Trilogy by the Chick Corea Trio, featuring Christian McBride and Brian Blade - Best Jazz Instrumental Album
- 2012 Forever by Chick Corea, Stanley Clarke, and Lenny White - Best Jazz Instrumental Album
- 2010 Live by Five Peace Band - Best Jazz Instrumental Album, Individual or Group
- 2009 The New Crystal Silence by Chick Corea and Gary Burton - Best Jazz Instrumental Album, Individual or Group

== Latin Grammy Awards ==
- 2011 Forever by Chick Corea, Stanley Clarke, and Lenny White - Best Instrumental Album

== Personal life ==
Over the years Vibberts has amassed a collection of over 9,000 CDs from all genres. In addition to music, Vibberts takes a great interest in astronomy and physics, having graduated in the subjects at the University of Massachusetts, Amherst.
