= Jason Huang =

Chinese-born American neurosurgeon

- Born: Shanghai, China
- Occupation: Academic neurosurgeon
- Awards: AO Spine Young Investigator Award; Army Commendation Medal; NREF Young Investigator's Award (AANS); Charles Elsberg Award (NYAM); David G. Kline Award (AANS); Codman Award (AANS); Super Doctor (Texas Monthly)

Academic background
- Education: Amherst College, Johns Hopkins University School of Medicine

Academic work
- Discipline: Spine, peripheral nerve disorders, neurotrauma
- Institutions: Baylor Scott & White Health, Temple, Texas; Baylor College of Medicine; Texas A&M HSC College of Medicine; Neuroscience Institute

Jason Huang is a Chinese-born American neurosurgeon at Baylor Scott & White Health in Temple, Texas. He is known for both clinical and research work in nervous system injury and repair, including traumatic brain injury, spinal trauma, and peripheral nerve injuries. He is the recipient of "U.S. News Top Docs".

== Early life ==
Huang was born in Shanghai, China.

== Education ==
Huang graduated from Amherst College, and received his medical degree from Johns Hopkins University School of Medicine. Following that, he finished neurosurgery residency training at University of Pennsylvania. During his residency training, he also completed his Neurotrauma & Critical Care and Complex Spine fellowships at University of Pennsylvania.

== Professional career ==
In 2006, Huang joined Strong Memorial Hospital and Highland Hospital in Rochester, NY as an attending neurosurgeon. During this time, he was deployed to Balad Theater Hospital in Iraq in 2008 in support of Operation Iraqi Freedom.

Huang received the Army Commendation Medal in 2008 and was honorably discharged from the United States Army Reserve in 2012 with the rank of lieutenant colonel.

In 2014, he joined Baylor Scott & White Health as director of the Neuroscience Institute and chairman of the Department of Neurosurgery, and was appointed professor of surgery at the Texas A&M University College of Medicine. At Baylor Scott & White, he established an ACGME-accredited neurosurgery residency program, for which he served as program director from 2015 to 2025.

Huang was elected president of the Texas Association of Neurological Surgeons for 2020 and served in that role through 2021. He became a tenured professor of neurosurgery at Baylor College of Medicine in 2022.

== Research ==
Huang's main research interest lies in the field of nervous system injury and repair. His lab has active extramural research funding including a prestigious R01 award from the National Institutes of Health.

== Publications ==
- Wang, Feng; Wang, Wen; Gu, Shenglan; Qi, Dan; Smith, Natalie A; Peng, Wei; Dong, Wei; Yuan, Jia; Zhao, Bo; Mao, Ying; Cao, Peng; Lu, Q. Richard; Shapiro, Lee A; Yi, S. Stephen; Wu, Erxi; Huang, Jason H (17 Apr 2023). "Distinct astrocytic modulatory roles in sensory transmission during sleep, wakefulness, and arousal states in freely moving mice". Nature Communications. 14 (1): 2186. Bibcode:2023NatCo..14.2186W. doi:10.1038/s41467-023-37974-z. PMC 10110578. PMID 37069258.
- Hua, Xiaorong; Li, Yue; Pentaparthi, Srikanth R; McGrail, Daniel J; Zou, Rui; Guo, Lei; Shrawat, Anju; Cirillo, Kristen M; Li, Qing; Bhat, Akshay V; Xu, Min; Qi, Dan; Singh, Anirudh; McGrath, Frances; Andrews, Steven B; Aung, Kyaw Lwin; Das, Jishnu; Zhou, Yunyun; Lodi, Alessia; Mills, Gordon B; Eckhardt, S. Gail; Mendillo, Marc L; Tiziani, Stefano; Wu, Erxi; Huang, Jason H; Sahni, Nidhi; Yi, S. Stephen (4 Jan 2023). "Landscape of microRNA regulatory network architecture and functional rerouting in cancer". Cancer Research. 83 (1): 59–73. doi:10.1158/0008-5472.CAN-20-0371. PMC 9811166. PMID 36265133.
- Wang, Feng; Zhou, Shanshan; Qi, Dan; Xiang, S. H.; Wong, Edward T; Wang, Xin; Fonkem, Ekokobe; Hsieh, T. C.; Yang, Jing; Kirmani, Babar; Shabb, James B; Wu, J. M.; Wu, Min; Huang, Jason H; Yu, Wei H; Wu, Erxi (27 Feb 2019). "Nucleolin is a functional binding protein for salinomycin in neuroblastoma stem cells". Journal of the American Chemical Society. 141 (8): 3613–3622. Bibcode:2019JAChS.141.3613W. doi:10.1021/jacs.8b12872. PMID 30689374.
- Wang, Feng; Zheng, Zhaoyang; Guan, Jing; Qi, Dan; Zhou, Shanshan; Shen, Xiaoming; Wenkert, Daniel; Kirmani, Babar; Solouki, Tae; Fonkem, Ekokobe; Wong, Edward T; Huang, Jason H; Wu, Erxi (Nov 2018). "Identification of a panel of genes as a prognostic biomarker for glioblastoma". eBioMedicine. 37: 68–77. doi:10.1016/j.ebiom.2018.10.014. PMC 6284420. PMID 30341039.
- Nizamutdinov, Dauletbek; Qi, Xudong; Berman, Matthew H; Dougal, Gordon; Dayawansa, Sanjeewa; Wu, Erxi; Yi, S. Stephen; Stevens, Albert B; Huang, Jason H (Jul 2021). "Transcranial near infrared light stimulations improve cognition in patients with dementia". Aging and Disease. 12 (4): 954–963. doi:10.14336/AD.2021.0128 (inactive 28 July 2026). PMC 8219492. PMID 34221541.
- Little, Douglas M; Geary, Erin K; Moynihan, Michael; Alexander, Andrew; Pennington, Michael; Glang, Ann; Schulze, Elizabeth T; Dretsch, Michael; Pacifico, Anthony; Davis, Marion L; Stevens, Albert B; Huang, Jason H (Jun 2014). "Imaging chronic traumatic brain injury as a risk factor for neurodegeneration". Alzheimer's & Dementia. 10 (3 Suppl): S188–S195. doi:10.1016/j.jalz.2014.05.1753. PMID 24924670.
- Qi, Dan; Geng, Yiqun; Cardenas, Jacob; Gu, Jinghua; Yi, S. Stephen; Huang, Jason H; Fonkem, Ekokobe; Wu, Erxi (25 Jan 2023). "Transcriptomic analyses of patient peripheral blood with hemoglobin depletion reveal glioblastoma biomarkers". npj Genomic Medicine. 8 (1): 2. doi:10.1038/s41525-022-00348-3. PMC 9877004. PMID 36697401.
- Soto, Jose M; Nguyen, Anthony V; van Zyl, Johanna S; Huang, Jason H (Jul 2023). "Outcomes after supratentorial craniotomy for primary malignant brain tumor resection in adult patients: A National Surgical Quality Improvement Program analysis". World Neurosurgery. 175: e780–e789. doi:10.1016/j.wneu.2023.04.020. PMID 37061032.
- Huang, Jason H; Zager, Eric L (Oct 2004). "Thoracic outlet syndrome". Neurosurgery. 55 (4): 897–902. doi:10.1227/01.neu.0000137333.04342.4d. PMID 15458598.
- Huang, Jason H; Zager, Eric L (Feb 2004). "Mini-open carpal tunnel decompression". Neurosurgery. 54 (2): 397–399. doi:10.1227/01.neu.0000103669.45726.51. PMID 14744287.

== Patents ==
- US 9114246, Jason H. Huang; Samantha Dayawansa, "Spinal nerve stimulation rings for rehabilitation of patients with spinal trauma and stroke", published 25 Aug 2015, assigned to University of Rochester
- US 9682248, Jason Haitao Huang; Samantha Dayawansa, "Deep brain magnetic stimulator", published 20 Jun 2017, assigned to University of Rochester
- US 9993168, Jason Haitao Huang; Samantha Dayawansa, "Implantable pressure monitor", published 12 Jun 2018, assigned to University of Rochester
- US 1000438, Jason Haitao Huang; Samantha Dayawansa, "Implantable real-time oximeter to determine potential strokes and post-traumatic brain-injury complications", published 26 Jun 2018, assigned to University of Rochester
- US 11883114, Jason H. Huang, "Ultrasound locatable surgical guidewire system and method", published 30 Jan 2024, assigned to Baylor University; Baylor Scott & White Health
- US 11969565, Jason H. Huang, "Programmable medical wire system and method", published 30 Apr 2024, assigned to Baylor University; Baylor Scott & White Health
