= The Fire Within (Jennifer Thomas album) =

Studio album by Jennifer Thomas
- Released: 12 October 2018
- Genre: Classical music, crossover music, Cinematic music
- Label: Tickled Ivory Music ASCAP
- Producer: Jennifer Thomas, Glen Gabriel

The Fire Within is the sixth album by American pianist Jennifer Thomas. It was released on 12 October 2018, debuting in the Billboard classical music charts at number 3, at number 2 in the classical crossover music chart and 25 in the Heatseekers chart.

== Development ==
The album was recorded using Abbey Road Studios, London; Opus 4 Studios, Bothell, Washington; the Yamaha Entertainment Group, Franklin, Tennessee; Glen Gabriel Music Studios, Stockholm; and Tickled Ivory Music Home Studios, Sequim, Washington. It was co-produced with Glen Gabriel and mixed by six-time Grammy-award-winning audio engineer Brian Vibberts.

== Track listing ==
The Fire Within track listing
No.	Title	Writer(s)	Length
1.	"The Fire Within" (featuring Thomas and the Rogue Pianist (dual piano))	Thomas and Kimberley StarKey	5:21
2.	"Awakening" (featuring Thomas (piano) and Tina Guo (cello))	Thomas	5:01
3.	"Girl in the Mirror" (featuring Thomas (piano) and Rose Johnson (flute))	Thomas	3:48
4.	"Rise of the Phoenix" (featuring Thomas (piano))	Thomas with themes from the Firebird Suite by Igor Stravinsky	4:04
5.	"Ascension" (featuring Thomas (piano and violin))	Thomas	4:26
6.	"Soaring" (featuring Thomas (piano and Eurielle (vocals))	Thomas	5:31
7.	"Because of You" (featuring Thomas (piano))	Thomas with themes from Paganini by Rachmaninoff	4:15
8.	"Believer" (arranged by and featuring Thomas (piano))	Dan Reynolds, Imagine Dragons	4:12
9.	"Time" (arranged by and featuring Thomas (piano))	Hans Zimmer	4:38
10.	"Glorious" (featuring Thomas (piano))	Thomas	3:47

== Personnel ==
Musicians

- Jennifer Thomas
- Kimberly StarKey, also known as The Rogue Pianist (piano)
- Tina Guo (cello)
- Eurielle (vocals)
- The English Session Orchestra, Abbey Road Studios, London
- Session players from the Ensign Symphony Seattle

Production

- Produced by Jennifer Thomas and Glen Gabriel
- Orchestration Glen Gabriel
- Engineered by Brian Vibberts
- Additional engineering by Ryan Nelson
- Mastered by Cristofer Stannow

== Preview ==
- In July 2018 the album was previewed with the Ensign Symphony & Chorus at a live Benaroya Hall Seattle concert.

== Reviews ==
- mormonmusic.org
- Sequim Gazette
