= Glen Gabriel =

- Born: Sweden
- Genres: Orchestral
- Occupation: Composer
- Years active: 2006 - present
- Website: www.glengabriel.com

Glen Gabriel is a Swedish composer of films, commercials, and a music arranger, primarily in the field of orchestral scores combined with electronica. He has been nominated for five Hollywood Music in Media Awards.

== Career ==
Gabriel has made music featured by organisations such as Electrolux, Lipton Tea, Sharp Aquos, US Marine Corps, Pizza Hut, Dr Pepper, 1800 Tequila, Guinness, US Census, US Navy, Elizabeth Arden, Ford, Coke Zero and Gillette. In 2014 one of his works was performed at the Zürich Opera House.

Gabriel has contributed to movies including The Game Changers (a 2018 documentary with executive producer James Cameron), Stressed to Kill (2016 movie directed by Mark Savage and starring Armand Assante), and to award-winning recordings by pianist Jennifer Thomas.

In 2012 he was nominated by the Hollywood Music in Media Awards in the Contemporary Orchestral/Instrumental category.

During 2017 Gabriel was credited as composing and conducting strings on the Steelheart release Through Worlds of Stardust, and received a Hollywood Music in Media Awards nomination in the original score independent film category for the Mark Savage movie Purgatory Road.

In September 2018 Gabriel was nominated by the Hollywood Music in Media Awards for producer/production in collaboration with Jennifer Thomas in recognition of the album The Fire Within. also in 2018 he contributed to the Netflix series Drug Lords and the American telenovela Mi familia perfecta.

During 2022 he was twice nominated by the Hollywood Music in Media Awards for his Dramatic/Crime genre composition Where Are You and his SciFi/Fantasy piece The First Gods.
