= Anastasiia Metelkina =

Russian-Georgian pair skater (born 2005)

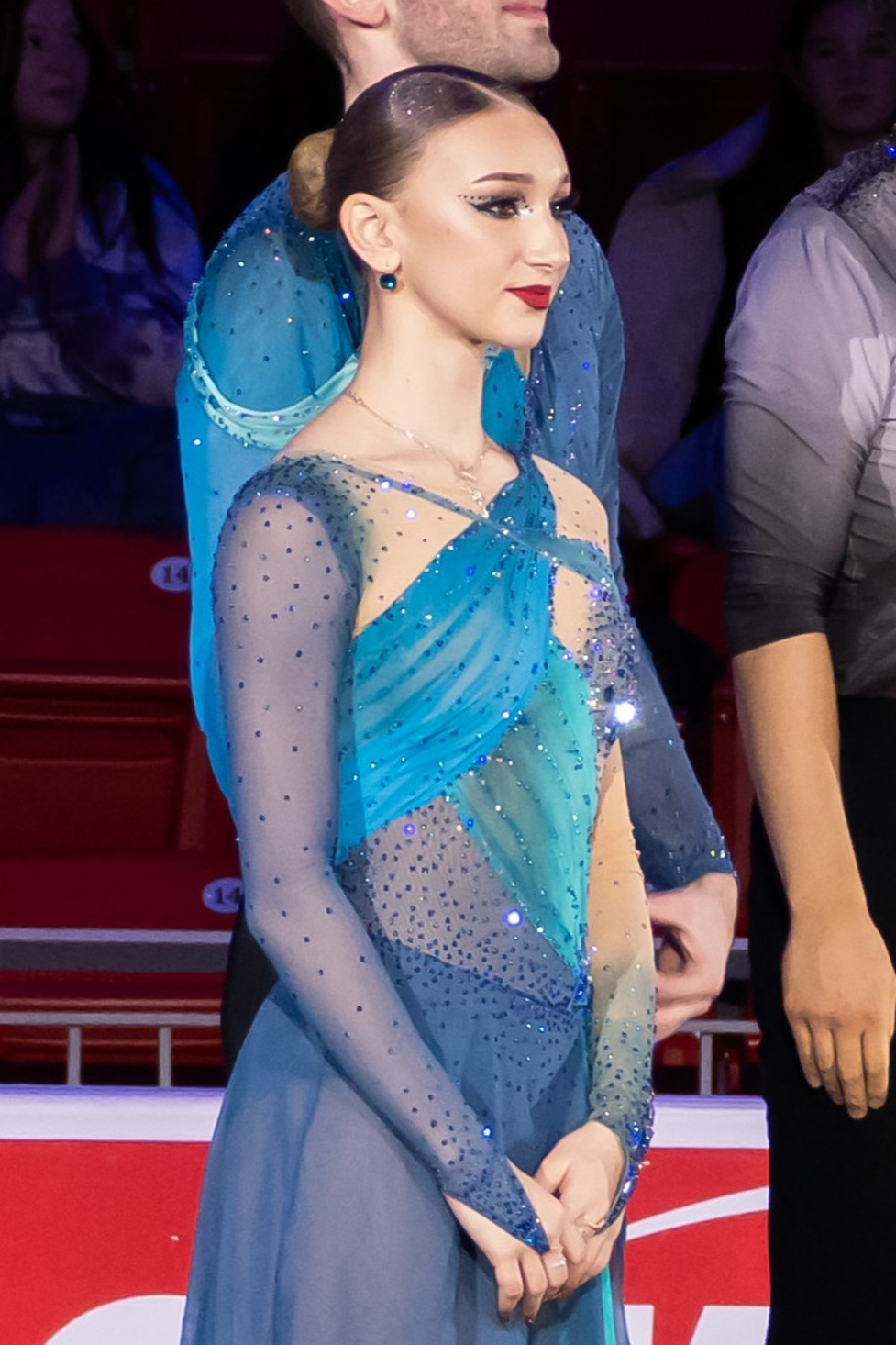
- Anastasiia Metelkina in 2025

Personal information
- Native name: Анастасия Николаевна Метёлкина (Russian)
- Full name: Anastasia Nikolaevna Metelkina
- Other names: Anastasia/Anastasiya Metyolkina
- Born: 10 March 2005 (age 21) Vladimir, Russia
- Height: 1.62 m (5 ft 4 in)

Figure skating career
- Country: Georgia (since 2020); Russia (2019–20)
- Discipline: Pair skating
- Partner: Luka Berulava (since 2023); Daniil Parkman (2020–22); Daniil Shvetsov (2019–20); Ilya Krasnikov (2019)
- Coach: Pavel Sliusarenko; Egor Zukroev
- Skating club: SSHOR
- Began skating: 2009

Medal record
Representing Georgia
Olympic Games
Silver medal – second place	2026 Milano Cortina	Pairs
World Championships
Silver medal – second place	2026 Prague	Pairs
European Championships
Gold medal – first place	2026 Sheffield	Pairs
Silver medal – second place	2024 Kaunas	Pairs
Bronze medal – third place	2025 Tallinn	Pairs
Grand Prix Final
Bronze medal – third place	2024–25 Grenoble	Pairs
World Junior Championships
Gold medal – first place	2024 Taipei	Pairs
Gold medal – first place	2025 Debrecen	Pairs
Junior Grand Prix Final
Gold medal – first place	2023–24 Beijing	Pairs

Anastasiia Nikolaevna Metelkina (Russian: Анастасия Николаевна Метёлкина; Georgian: ანასტასია ნიკოლაევნა მეტელკინა; born 10 March 2005) is a Russian-born pair skater who competes for Georgia. With current partner Luka Berulava, she is an Olympic silver medalist (2026), World silver medalist (2026), European champion (2026), two-time European Championship medalist (2024, 2025), 2024–25 Grand Prix Final bronze medalist, a four-time Grand Prix medalist, and a four-time Challenger Series medalist. On the junior level, Metelkina/Berulava are two-time World Junior champions (2024, 2025), the 2023–24 Junior Grand Prix Final champion, and a two-time Junior Grand Prix gold medalist.

She and Berulava are the first Georgian athletes to ever win a medal at a Winter Olympic Games.

Metelkina previously competed with Daniil Parkman, winning a bronze medal at the 2022 Grand Prix of Espoo and a silver medal at the 2021 Golden Spin of Zagreb. Metelkina/Parkman were the first Georgian pairs team to compete at a World Championships, doing so in 2021.

== Personal life ==
Metelkina was born on March 10, 2005, in Vladimir, Russia.

== Career ==
Metelkina began figure skating in 2009. Her first pair partners were Daniil Shvetsov and Ilya Krasnikov, with whom she represented Russia.

=== Pair skating with Daniil Parkman ===
==== 2020–21 season: Debut of Metelkina/Parkman ====
In December 2020, it was announced that Metelkina had teamed up with fellow Russian pair skater, Daniil Parkman, and that they would be representing Georgia together. In February 2021, it was announced that the pair had earned the minimum technical scores to compete at the 2021 World Championships in Stockholm, Sweden.

Making their debut as a pair team at these Championships, Metelkina/Parkman placed fourteenth in the short program and sixteenth in the free skate, finishing the event in sixteenth-place overall. They became the first Georgian pair team to compete at a World Championships.

==== 2021–22 season ====
Metelkina/Parkman began their season with a silver medal at the 2021 Budapest Trophy, before going on to finish fifth at the 2021 Warsaw Cup. At the 2021 Golden Spin of Zagreb, the pair took the silver medal.

Although assigned to compete at both the 2022 European Championships and the 2022 World Championships, the pair ultimately withdrew from both events and were replaced by Safina/Berulava.

==== 2022–23 season: Grand Prix medal ====
Metelkina/Parkman opened their season at the 2022 Nebelhorn Trophy, finishing fifth. They went on to compete on the Grand Prix series, finishing fourth at the 2022 MK John Wilson Trophy as well as taking bronze at the 2022 Grand Prix of Espoo.

Despite being selected to compete at the 2023 European Championships, Metelkina/Parkman ultimately ended their partnership in December 2022.

=== Pair skating with Luka Berulava ===
==== 2023–24 season: Debut of Metelkina/Berulava, European silver medal, and World Junior Champions ====
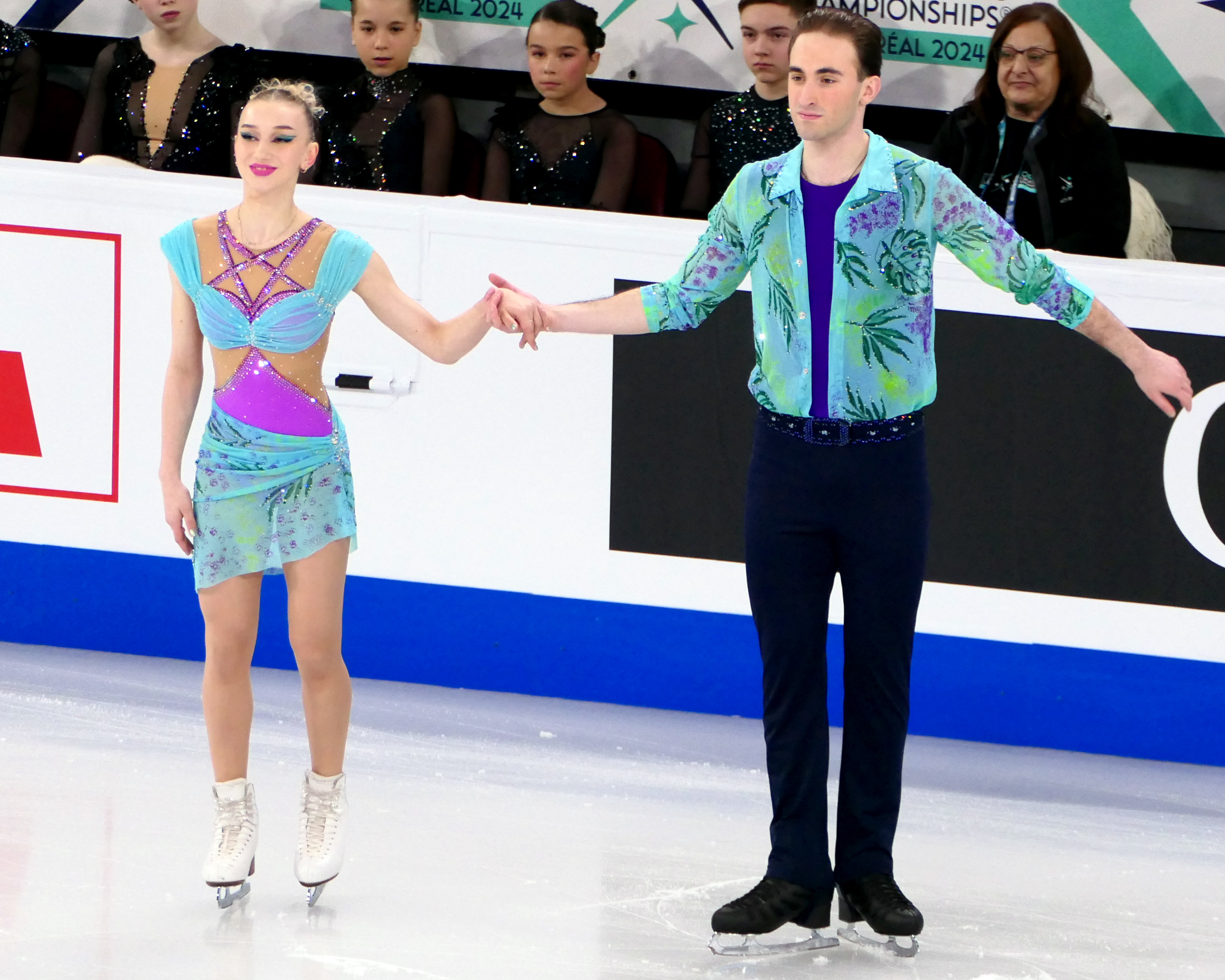
Metelkina and Berulava at the 2024 World Championships

In June 2023, it was announced that Metelkina had former a new partnership with Luka Berulava and that they would train in Perm, Russia under Pavel Sliusarenko, Egor Zukroev, and Maxim Trankov. Metelkina/Berulava opted to make their competitive debut on the Junior Grand Prix, a first for Metelkina, winning the gold medal at the 2023 JGP Turkey in Istanbul. Despite two falls in their free skate, their margin of victory over American silver medalists Flores/Wang was almost 27 points. Two weeks later they competed their second event, the 2023 JGP Hungary in Budapest. They again won easily, despite difficulties on their jump elements. Metelkina/Berulava's results qualified them to the Junior Grand Prix Final in December; they said they planned on getting senior-level experience in the meantime.

Metelkina/Berulava made their senior debut at the Warsaw Cup, winning the gold medal. They then entered the Junior Grand Prix Final as heavy favourites to take the title, and won by a 34-point margin over Canadian silver medalists Kemp/Elizarov. They were the first Georgian pair team to win the Junior Grand Prix Final gold.

Entering the 2024 European Championships in Kaunas as among the favourites, Metelkina/Berulava took first place in the short program, winning a gold small medal. Metelkina erred on both of her jump sequences in the free skate, and they came fifth in that segment, dropping to second place overall. They finished 3.05 points back of champions Beccari/Guarise of Italy. Berulava remarked that "not everything worked out. But it's only our first season together and silver is also a medal."

Having earned a medal at a senior championship event before returning to junior competition, Metelkina/Berulava were heavy favourites at the 2024 World Junior Championships in Taipei. They won the short program by a margin of 9.20 points. Although they struggled in the free skate, with errors on all four jumping elements, they ultimately claimed the gold medal. Both vowed to work harder in training after the difficulties in the free program.

Making their senior World Championship debut as a team at the 2024 edition in Montreal, Metelkina/Berulava were fifth in the short program. They were only 0.08 points behind fourth-place Germans Hase/Volodin, thus narrowly missing participation in the final flight of the free skate. In that segment, they struggled with several errors, including an aborted lift, which saw them come tenth in the free skate and drop to seventh overall. Speaking afterward, a "despondent" Berulava said: "Right now, I don't have words to comment on this performance."

==== 2024–25 season: First Grand Prix gold, European bronze medal, and second World Junior gold medal ====
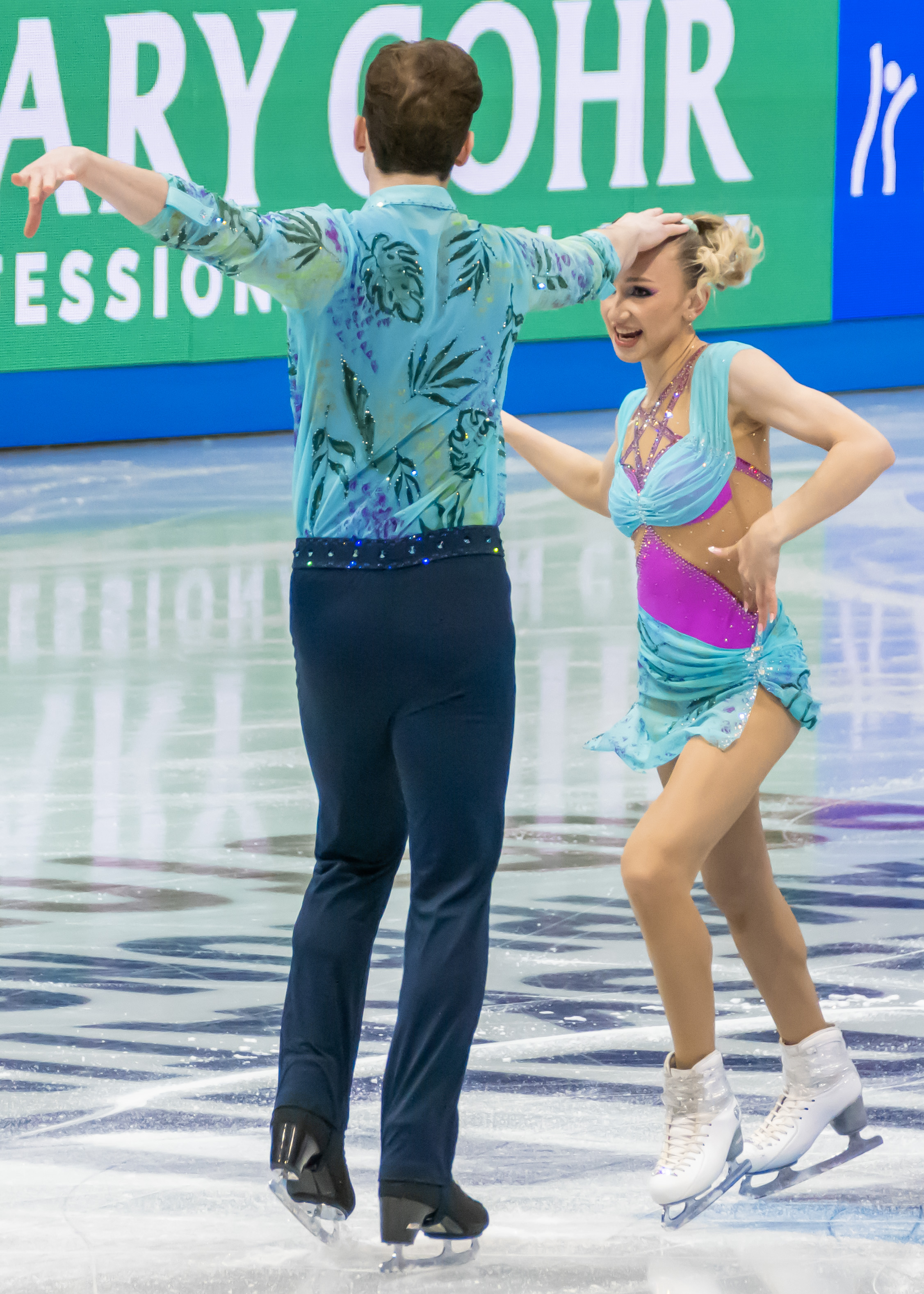
Metelkina and Berluava performing their short program at the 2025 World Championships

Metelkina/Berulava did not compete on the Challenger circuit at the start of the season, as he explained their belief that they had begun the prior season "too early," as a result of which "we ended up feeling exhausted by the time the most important tournaments came by." They began the Grand Prix at the 2024 Skate America, where they came third in the short program but dropped to fourth overall after a fourth-place free skate that featured multiple jump errors and a fall in their death spiral element. They missed the bronze medal by a fraction of a point, but Metelkina said that the "short margin to the bronze medal is not what really matters. The mistakes are what we have to improve and work on." At their second event, the 2024 NHK Trophy, Metelkina/Berulava won the gold medal, defeating reigning World champions Miura/Kihara in the process. This was the first Grand Prix medal of any colour for a Georgian pair team, of which Berulava said they were "just so proud." Shortly afterward, they competed at and won the 2024 CS Warsaw Cup.

The team's results at their Grand Prix events qualified them for the Grand Prix Final in Grenoble. They were third in the short program with a new personal best score of 72.26 points. They were second in the free skate with the lone error being an underrotated jump by Metelkina, remaining third overall and taking the bronze medal. The following month at 2025 European Championships, Metelkina/Berulava entered as podium favourites, but came ninth in the short program after multiple errors, including an invalid death spiral. They rebounded in the free skate, coming third in that segment and rising to third overall for their second bronze medal at a major event of the season.

Metelkina/Berulava opted to return to the junior level to compete at the 2025 World Junior Championships in Debrecen, for which they were subject to some criticism in skating circles. Berulava defended the decision, noting that it was allowed by the ISU's rules, and citing a desire to gain competitive experience and World Standing points. They won both segments of the competition by a wide margin, taking their second consecutive World Junior title (and Berulava's third) by a margin of almost 27 points.

At the 2025 World Championships, they finished fourth in the short program, sixth in the free skate, and fourth overall. "Actually, we’re happy with the fourth place, considering what we did," said Berulava. "It was a long season, but due to the good preparation by our coaches, we are not feeling tired and exhausted. We still feel ready to go, and we’re actually really hoping to make the World Team Trophy.”

The team capped off the season with 2025 World Team Trophy where they placed third in both the short program and free skate, with Team Georgia taking sixth place overall. At this event, they earned a new personal best for both the short program and total score. “It feels easier to skate in this event as there is so much support,” said Metelkina. “We hope to get into the Olympic team event and this competition was a good practice. It was very important for us to be here.”

==== 2025–26 season: Milano Cortina Olympic Pairs silver, World silver, and European champions ====
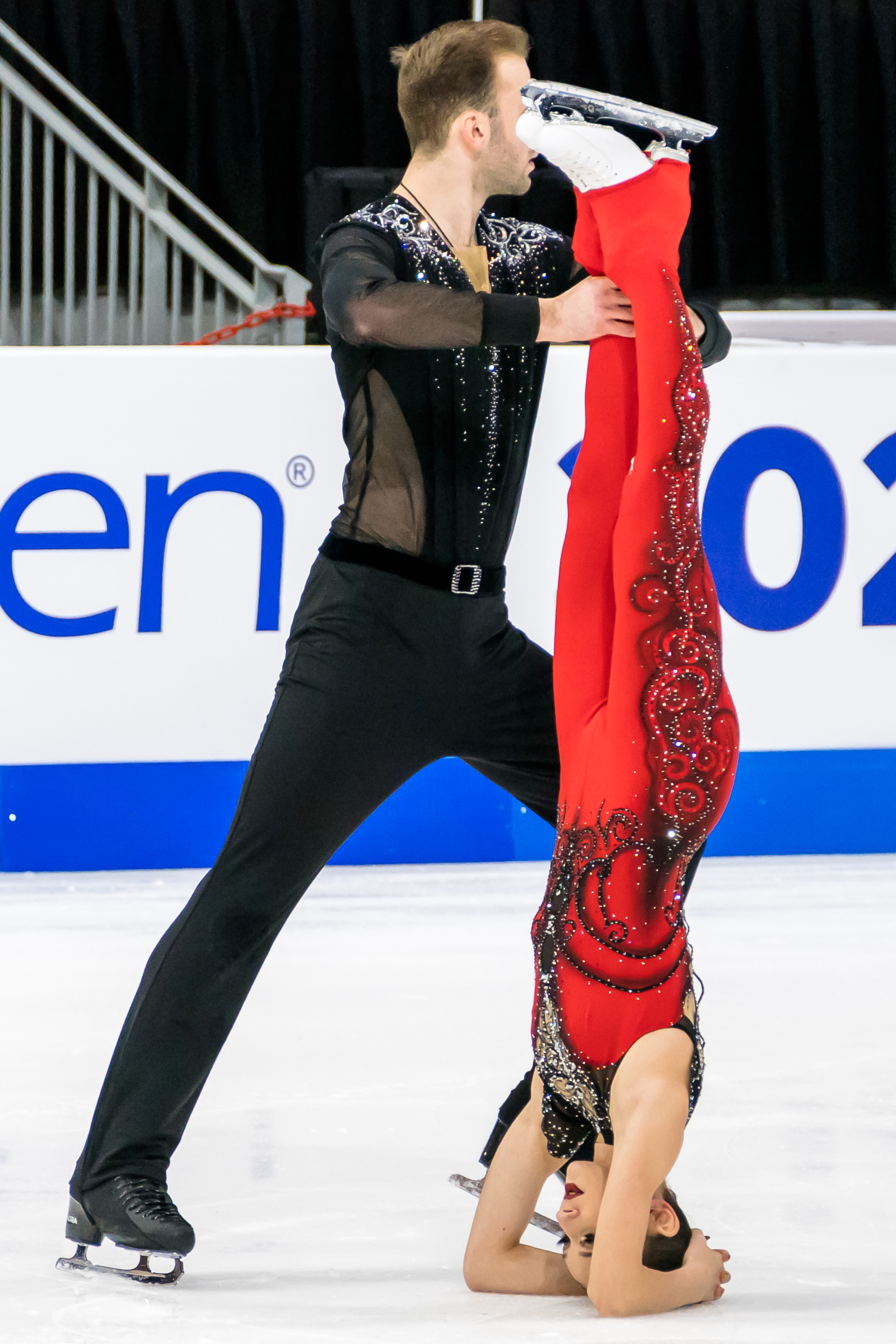
Metelkina and Berulava doing their opening pose for their short program at 2025 Skate America

Metelkina/Berulava opened the 2025–26 season in September at 2025 CS Kinoshita Group Cup where they earned the silver medal. The following month, they took gold at 2025 CS Trialeti Trophy.

Two weeks later, the team competed at 2025 Cup of China where they won their second individual Grand Prix gold. "Today was a rather difficult day," said Berulava after the free skate. "I'm glad we fought for this gold medal and didn't give up after the mistake on the jump."

The following month, Metelkina/Berulava took silver at 2025 Skate America. They placed first in the short program, but made costly mistakes in the free skate where they finished fourth. “Unfortunately, our performance today did not work out, but we will work hard,” said Berulava. “We want to improve, and we also will work on the mental side." After medaling in both Grand Prix events, they qualified for the 2025-26 Grand Prix of Figure Skating Final. “Now we will take a deep breath after this, and we will work on our mistakes,” Metelkina summed up. “And I'm also very pleased that the Final is in Japan. We always skate very well in Japan."

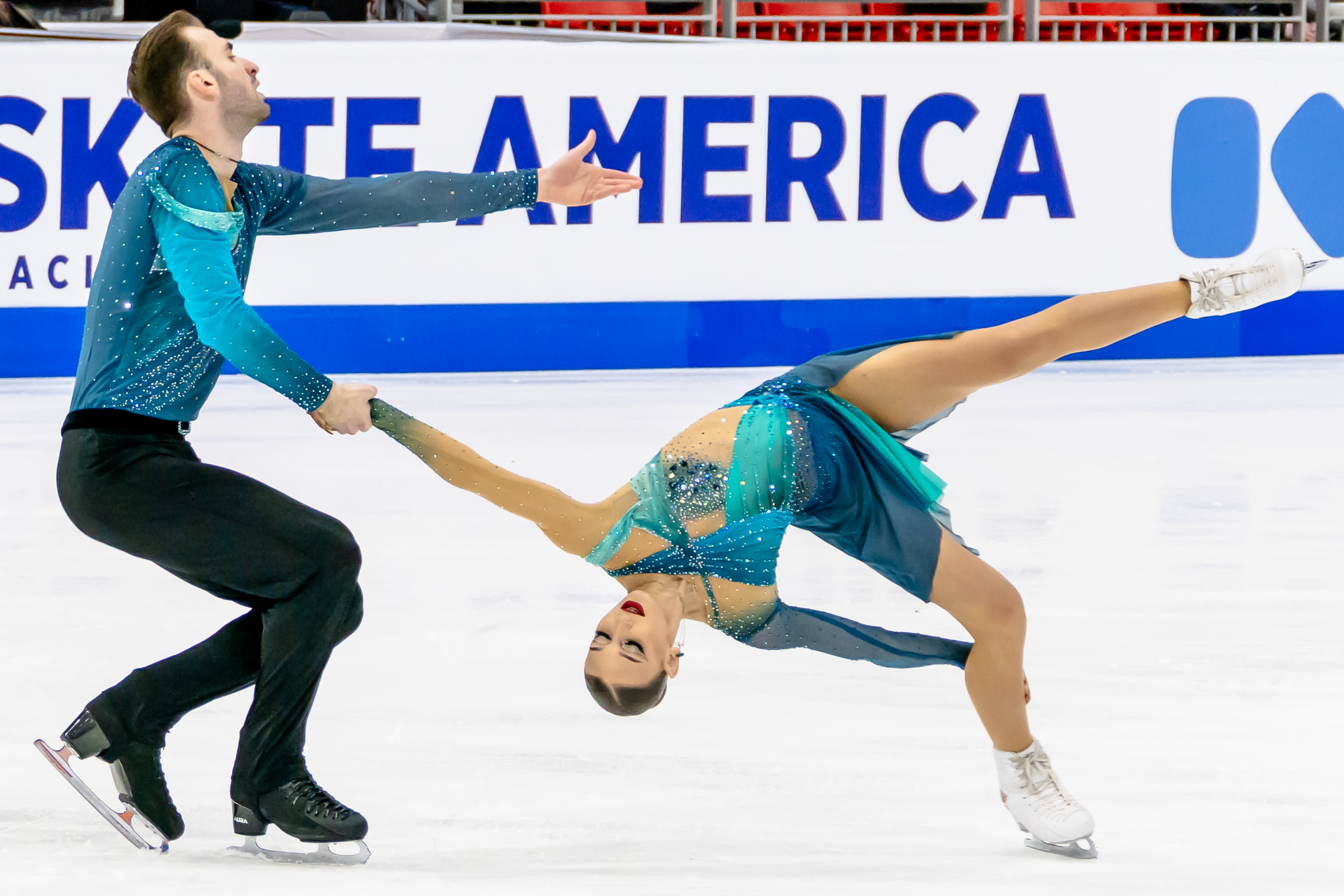
Metelkina and Berulava performing a death spiral during their free skate at 2025 Skate America

In December, Metelkina/Berulava finished fourth at the 2025–26 Grand Prix Final. They placed third in the short program and fourth in the free skate after a shaky lift. "The skate was OK, we made some mistakes," Berulava acknowledged. "After the Final we will go home and will train hard to win the Europeans."

The following month, the duo won the gold at the 2026 European Championships, becoming the first Georgian Pairs team to do so. "We are crazy happy to have won the European championships!" said Metelkina. "We’ve had the bronze, the silver, and now we finally got the gold medal. We couldn't be happier right now!" The team will compete next at the 2026 Winter Olympics. "Right now, the situation is very interesting," said Berulava of the upcoming Olympics. "It's fascinating because there's not a clear leader. There are six top teams and all together, and everyone is aiming for the gold medal. Each of us, each athlete, we all have the same goal."

On 6 February, Metelkina/Berulava placed second in the short program in the 2026 Winter Olympics Figure Skating Team Event. "It was a calm skate, a good warm up," said Metelkina. "We are confident and our coaches and our federation has confidence in us, too. We can do it all and practices were excellent. We had a very good week of training before the Olympic Games, therefore we went out calmly and did what we know we can do." Two days later, they placed second in the free skate and Team Georgia finished in fourth place overall.

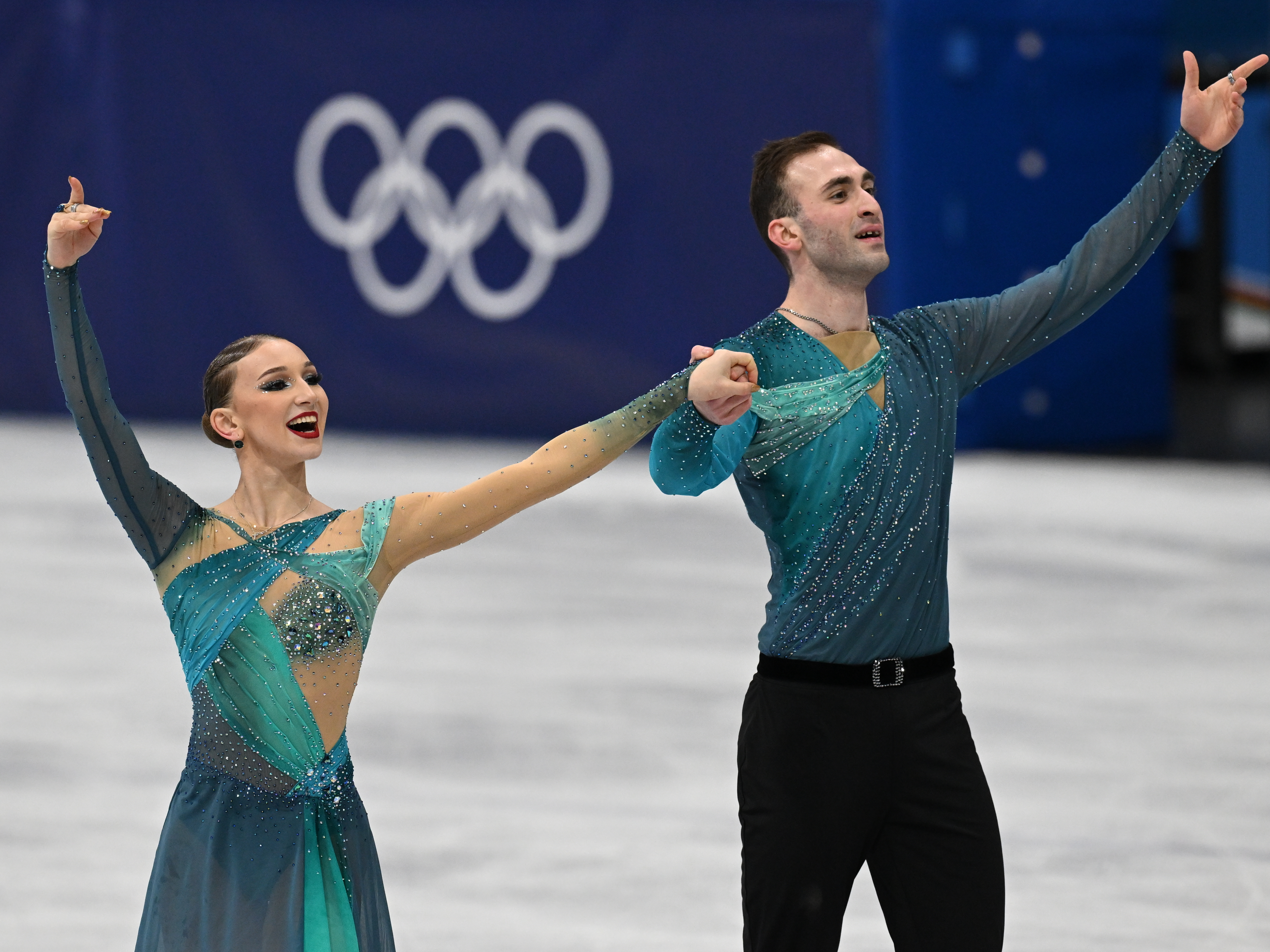
Metelkina and Berulava after their performance at the 2026 Winter Olympics

On 15 February, Metelkina/Berulava competed in the short program of the Pairs event. They placed second in the short program despite Metelkina stepping out of the throw triple flip. "I'm always a maximalist, so I'm not satisfied that I made a mistake on an element that is usually the most consistent for me,” said Metelkina. “I will try to do everything clean tomorrow. I'm absolutely satisfied with what my partner did today. I am also grateful about the great support my partner gave me." The following day, the pair skated a clean free program aside from Metelkina stepping out of the throw triple loop, placing second in that segment and winning the silver medal overall. With this result, Metelkina/Berulava made history as the first Georgian athletes to medal at a Winter Olympic Games. "It is a huge honor, and I am incredibly happy that our names are now written as the first Georgians to win a medal at the Olympic Winter Games. It's a huge honor. It was a long path for us, and we are unbelievably happy about it," said Berulava following the result. "I hope that after us, a big team will develop in Georgia — that we will have second, third, fourth pairs, and that there will be competition inside the country. After the end of my career, I want to take care of this, because I love figure skating and I want to do everything to develop pair skating in Georgia."

On March 26, 2026, Metelkina/Berulava made history by becoming the first Georgian pair team to earn a world medal (silver) at the 2026 World Figure Skating Championships. They placed second in the short program and fourth in the free skate. "I'm very happy because this is our first medal at the World Championships and also that we ended the season on a high note," said Metelkina. "There's a medal and there are a lot of emotions. This season, I really want to thank everybody who was part of our preparation—our coaches, our federation. We tried our best and we will continue to try our best."

==== 2026–27 season ====
Metelkina/Berulava opened the 2026–27 season in September on home ice at 2026 CS Trialeti Trophy where they earned the gold medal. The following month, they took gold in their first Grand Prix event of the season at 2026 Grand Prix de France. Despite the win, Berulava was disappointed with their free skate. “What you saw from us today was bad,” he Berulava. “We can do much better and skate much cleaner. I don’t really feel like a winner right now, even though we won. We want to show a clean skate and a real fight in the future. We’ll keep working hard to achieve the best possible results.”

Two weeks later, the pair won silver in the 2026 Cup of China behind Anastasia Mishina and Aleksandr Galliamov to qualify for the Grand Prix Final.”

== Programs ==
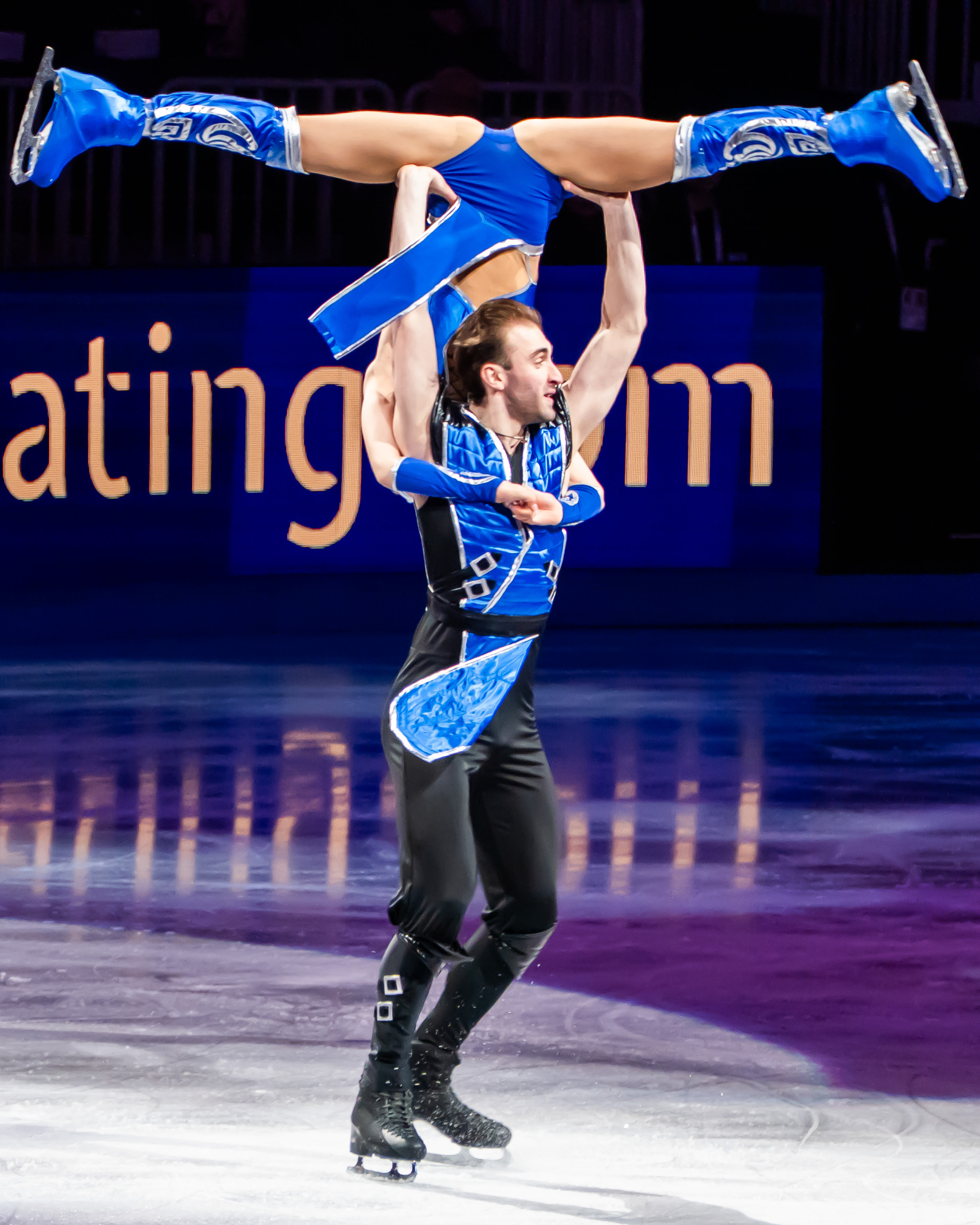
Metelkina and Berulava performing a pair lift during their exhibition program at the 2025 World Championships

=== Pair skating with Luka Berulava ===
Season	Short program	Free skate	Exhibition	Ref.
2023–24	"Summertime" (from Porgy and Bess) By George Gershwin, DuBose Heyward & Ira Gershwin Performed by Billy Stewart Choreo. by Sergei Plishkin & Ivan Malafeev	"The Millionaire Waltz" By Queen Choreo. by Sergei Plishkin & Ivan Malafeev	"Tango Sassetta" By Andreas Hinterseher & Martina Eisenreich	
2024–25	"Why?" By Bronski Beat Choreo. by Sergei Plishkin & Ivan Malafeev; "Summertime"	"A Necessary End" By Saltillo Choreo. by Sergei Plishkin & Ivan Malafeev	"Tango Sassetta"	
2024–25	"Why?" By Bronski Beat Choreo. by Sergei Plishkin & Ivan Malafeev; "Summertime"	"A Necessary End" By Saltillo Choreo. by Sergei Plishkin & Ivan Malafeev	"Techno Syndrome (Mortal Kombat)" (from Mortal Kombat) By The Immortals; "True" By Spandau Ballet	
2025–26	Boléro (Excerpt) By Maurice Ravel Performed by Miloš Karadaglić Choreo. by Sergei Plishkin & Ivan Malafeev	Le discours d'Arthur (from Le meilleur reste à venir) by Jérôme Rebotier; Keeping Me Alive (Acoustic) by Jonathan Roy Choreo. by Benoît Richaud	"Techno Syndrome (Mortal Kombat)" (from Mortal Kombat) By The Immortals; "True" By Spandau Ballet	
2026–27	EX Cathedra by Michal Smorawinski	The Feeling Begins by Peter Gabriel	Selections from Ratatouille (soundtrack) composed by Michael Giacchino	

=== Pair skating with Daniil Parkman ===
Season	Short program	Free skate	Exhibition	Ref.
2020–21	"Nothing Else Matters" By Metallica Performed by Marlisa Choreo. by Yuri Anonian	"Rain, In Your Black Eyes" By Ezio Bosso Choreo. by Yuri Anonian	—N/a	
2021–22	"Can't Help Falling in Love" Performed by Tommee Profitt, feat. brooke Choreo. by Yuri Anonian	"Rain, In Your Black Eyes" By Ezio Bosso Choreo. by Yuri Anonian	—N/a	
2022–23	"I'll Take Care of You" Performed by Beth Hart & Joe Bonamassa Choreo. by Denis Lunin	"Lamentations" By Marimuz Choreo. by Denis Lunin	"Say Something" By A Great Big World, feat. Christina Aguilera Performed by James Harris	

== Competitive highlights ==
- GP – Event of the ISU Grand Prix Series
- JGP – Event of the ISU Junior Grand Prix Series
- TBD – Assigned
- WD – Withdrew from competition
- Medals at team events are awarded for the team results only. Individual placements at team events are listed in parentheses.

=== Pair skating with Luka Berulava ===
Competition placements at senior level
Season	2023–24	2024–25	2025–26	2026–27
Winter Olympics			2nd	
Winter Olympics (Team event)			4th	
World Championships	7th	4th	2nd	
European Championships	2nd	3rd	1st	
Grand Prix Final		3rd	4th	TBD
World Team Trophy		6th (3rd)		
GP Cup of China			1st	2nd
GP NHK Trophy		1st		
GP Skate America		4th	2nd	
GP France				1st
CS Trialeti Trophy			1st	1st
CS Warsaw Cup	1st	1st		
CS Kinoshita Group Cup			2nd	
Challenge Cup		1st		

Competition placements at junior level
Season	2023–24	2024-25
World Junior Championships	1st	1st
Junior Grand Prix Final	1st	
JGP Hungary	1st	
JGP Turkey	1st	

=== Pair skating with Daniil Parkman ===
Competition placements at senior level
Season	2020–21	2021–22	2022–23
World Championships	16th		
GP Finland			3rd
GP Wilson Trophy			4th
CS Golden Spin of Zagreb		2nd	
CS Nebelhorn Trophy			5th
CS Warsaw Cup		5th	
Budapest Trophy		2nd	
Denis Ten Memorial		4th	

== Detailed results ==
=== Pair skating with Luka Berulava ===
ISU personal best scores in the +5/-5 GOE System
Segment	Type	Score	Event
Total	TSS	225.20	2025 CS Trialeti Trophy
Short program	TSS	80.01	2026 CS Trialeti Trophy
Short program	TES	44.44	2025 Skate America
Short program	PCS	36.50	2026 CS Trialeti Trophy
Free skating	TSS	148.07	2025 CS Trialeti Trophy
Free skating	TES	77.98	2025 CS Trialeti Trophy
Free skating	PCS	72.35	2026 CS Trialeti Trophy

- Small medals for the short program and free skating are only awarded at ISU Championships.

==== Senior level ====
Results in the 2023–24 season
Date	Event	SP		FS		Total	
Date	Event	P	Score	P	Score	P	Score
Nov 16–19, 2023	(Poland) 2023 Warsaw Cup	1	66.93	1	137.08	1	204.01
Jan 8–14, 2024	(Lithuania) 2024 European Championships	1	71.30	5	124.84	2	196.14
Mar 18–24, 2024	(Canada) 2024 World Championships	5	72.02	10	117.28	7	189.30

Results in the 2024–25 season
Date	Event	SP		FS		Total	
Date	Event	P	Score	P	Score	P	Score
Oct 18–20, 2024	(United States) 2024 Skate America	3	68.64	4	122.79	4	191.43
Nov 8–10, 2024	(Japan) 2024 NHK Trophy	2	70.28	1	142.77	1	213.05
Nov 20–24, 2024	(Poland) 2024 CS Warsaw Cup	1	67.17	1	134.86	1	202.03
Dec 5–8, 2024	(France) 2024–25 Grand Prix Final	3	72.26	2	133.52	3	205.78
Jan 28 – Feb 2, 2025	(Estonia) 2025 European Championships	9	57.03	3	134.85	3	191.88
Feb 13–16, 2025	(Netherlands) 2025 Challenge Cup	1	70.58	1	133.34	1	203.92
Mar 25–30, 2025	(United States) 2025 World Championships	4	71.68	6	130.53	4 (3)	202.21
Apr 17–20, 2025	(Japan) 2025 World Team Trophy	3	73.67	3	139.96	6	213.63

Results in the 2025–26 season
Date	Event	SP		FS		Total	
Date	Event	P	Score	P	Score	P	Score
Sep 5–7, 2025	(Japan) 2025 CS Kinoshita Group Cup	2	75.32	2	137.58	2	212.90
Oct 8–11, 2025	(Georgia (country)) 2025 CS Trialeti Trophy	1	77.13	1	148.07	1	225.20
Oct 24–26, 2025	2025 Cup of China	1	77.77	1	139.47	1	217.24
Nov 14–16, 2025	(United States) 2025 Skate America	1	78.83	4	116.90	2	195.73
Dec 4–7, 2025	(Japan) 2025–26 Grand Prix Final	3	75.04	4	136.49	4	211.53
Jan 13–18, 2026	(United Kingdom) 2026 European Championships	1	75.96	1	139.80	1	215.76
Feb 6–8, 2026	(Italy) 2026 Winter Olympics – Team event	2	77.54	2	139.70	4	—N/a
Feb 6–19, 2026	(Italy) 2026 Winter Olympics	2	75.46	2	146.29	2	221.75
Mar 24–29, 2026	(Czech Republic) 2026 World Championships	2	79.45	4	138.96	2	218.41

Results in the 2026–27 season
Date	Event	SP		FS		Total	
Date	Event	P	Score	P	Score	P	Score
Oct 1-4, 2026	(Georgia (country)) 2026 CS Trialeti Trophy	1	80.01	1	135.82	1	215.83
Oct 23–25, 2026	2026 Grand Prix de France	1	77.34	1	127.31	1	204.65
Nov 6–8, 2026	2026 Cup of China	2	67.06	2	131.21	2	198.27

==== Junior level ====
Results in the 2023–24 season
Date	Event	SP		FS		Total	
Date	Event	P	Score	P	Score	P	Score
Sep 6–9, 2023	2023 JGP Turkey	1	67.92	1	113.45	1	181.37
Sep 20–23, 2023	2023 JGP Hungary	1	69.94	1	120.51	1	190.45
Dec 7–10, 2023	(China) 2023–24 Junior Grand Prix Final	1	70.48	1	131.63	1	202.11
Feb 26 – Mar 3, 2024	(Taiwan) 2024 World Junior Championships	1	71.53	1	107.79	1	179.32

Results in the 2024–25 season
Date	Event	SP		FS		Total	
Date	Event	P	Score	P	Score	P	Score
Feb 25 – Mar 2, 2025	(Hungary) 2025 World Junior Championships	1	69.18	1	121.83	1	191.01

=== Pair skating with Daniil Parkman ===
ISU personal best scores in the +5/-5 GOE System
Segment	Type	Score	Event
Total	TSS	189.60	2021 CS Golden Spin of Zagreb
Short program	TSS	65.97	2021 CS Golden Spin of Zagreb
Short program	TES	35.81	2021 CS Golden Spin of Zagreb
Short program	PCS	30.16	2021 CS Golden Spin of Zagreb
Free skating	TSS	123.63	2021 CS Golden Spin of Zagreb
Free skating	TES	62.75	2021 CS Golden Spin of Zagreb
Free skating	PCS	60.88	2021 CS Golden Spin of Zagreb

Results in the 2020–21 season
Date	Event	SP		FS		Total	
Date	Event	P	Score	P	Score	P	Score
Mar 22–28, 2021	(Sweden) 2021 World Championships	14	56.13	16	100.60	16	156.73

Results in the 2021–22 season
Date	Event	SP		FS		Total	
Date	Event	P	Score	P	Score	P	Score
Oct 14–17, 2021	(Hungary) 2021 Budapest Trophy	2	66.52	2	121.51	2	188.03
Oct 27–31, 2021	(Kazakhstan) 2021 Denis Ten Memorial Challenge	5	61.06	4	114.36	4	175.42
Nov 17–20, 2021	(Poland) 2021 CS Warsaw Cup	4	62.70	4	121.54	5	184.24
Dec 9–11, 2021	(Croatia) 2021 CS Golden Spin of Zagreb	4	65.97	4	123.63	2	189.60

Results in the 2022–23 season
Date	Event	SP		FS		Total	
Date	Event	P	Score	P	Score	P	Score
Sep 21–24, 2022	(Germany) 2022 CS Nebelhorn Trophy	5	62.15	5	103.29	5	165.44
Nov 11–13, 2022	(United Kingdom) 2022 MK John Wilson Trophy	4	58.70	4	106.90	4	165.60
Nov 25–27, 2022	(Finland) 2022 Grand Prix of Espoo	3	62.59	3	103.97	3	166.56
