= Luka Berulava =

Georgian pair skater (born 2002)

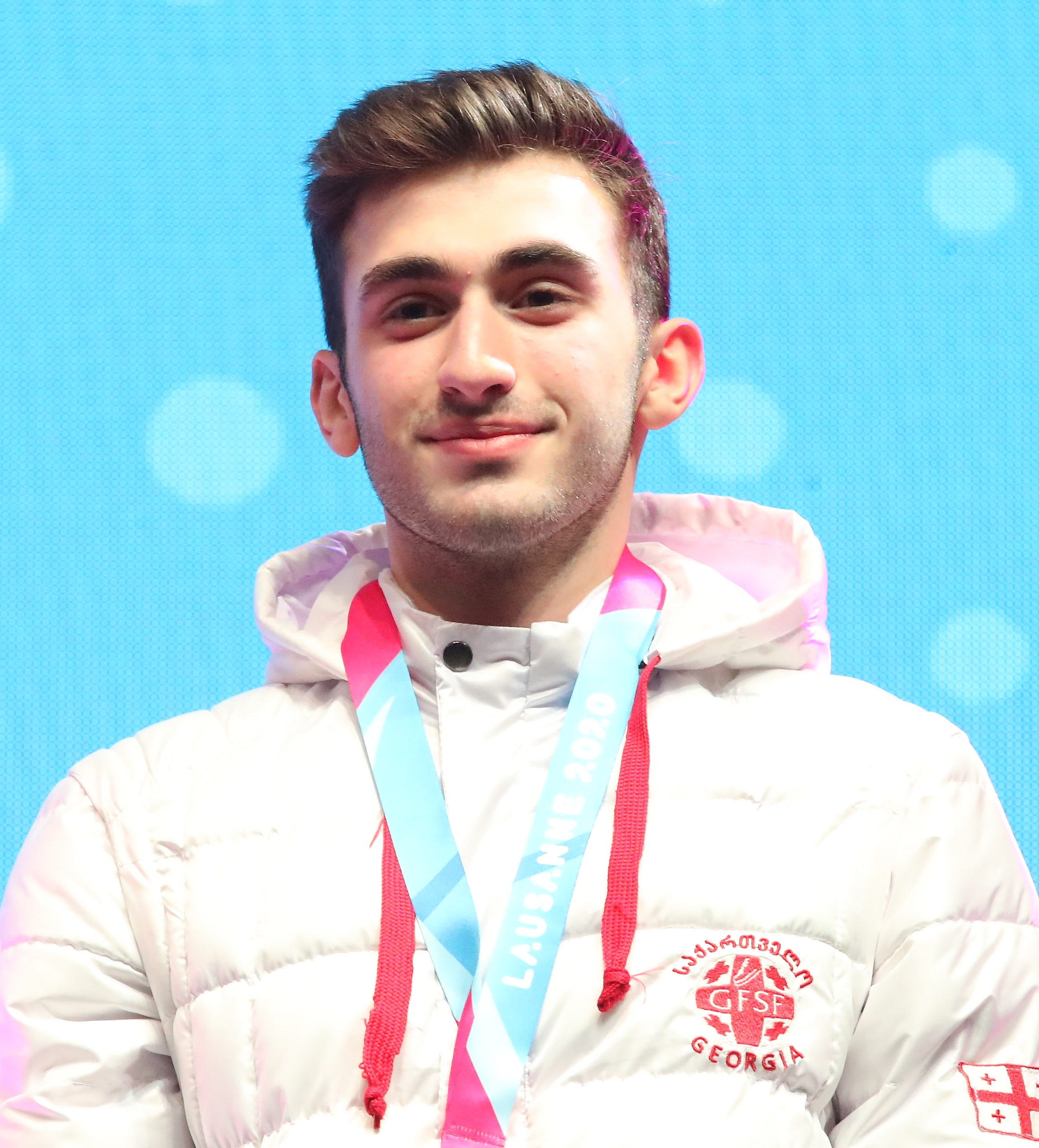
- Luka Berulava at the 2020 Winter Youth Olympics

Personal information
- Native name: ლუკა ბერულავა
- Born: 27 November 2002 (age 23) Moscow, Russia
- Height: 1.86 m (6 ft 1 in)

Figure skating career
- Country: Georgia
- Discipline: Pair skating
- Partner: Anastasiia Metelkina (since 2023); Karina Safina (2021–22); Alina Butaeva (2019–20)
- Coach: Pavel Sliusarenko; Egor Zukroev
- Began skating: 2005

Medal record
Event	Gold medal – first place	Silver medal – second place	Bronze medal – third place
Olympic Games	0	1	0
World Championships	0	1	0
European Championships	1	1	1
Grand Prix Final	0	0	1
Winter Youth Olympics	1	0	1
World Junior Championships	3	0	0
Junior Grand Prix Final	1	0	0
Medal list
Olympic Games
Silver medal – second place	2026 Milano Cortina	Pairs
World Championships
Silver medal – second place	2026 Prague	Pairs
European Championships
Gold medal – first place	2026 Sheffield	Pairs
Silver medal – second place	2024 Kaunas	Pairs
Bronze medal – third place	2025 Tallinn	Pairs
Grand Prix Final
Bronze medal – third place	2024–25 Grenoble	Pairs
Winter Youth Olympics
Gold medal – first place	2020 Lausanne	Team
Bronze medal – third place	2020 Lausanne	Pairs
World Junior Championships
Gold medal – first place	2022 Tallinn	Pairs
Gold medal – first place	2024 Taipei	Pairs
Gold medal – first place	2025 Debrecen	Pairs
Junior Grand Prix Final
Gold medal – first place	2023–24 Beijing	Pairs

Luka Berulava (Georgian: ლუკა ბერულავა; born 27 November 2002) is a Georgian pair skater. With current partner Anastasia Metelkina, he is an Olympic silver medalist (2026), World silver medalist (2026), European champion (2026), two-time European Championship medalist (2024, 2025), 2024–25 Grand Prix Final bronze medalist, a four-time Grand Prix medalist, and a four-time Challenger Series medalist. On the junior level, the pair are two-time World Junior champions (2024, 2025), the 2023–24 Junior Grand Prix Final champion, and a two-time ISU Junior Grand Prix gold medalists. He and Metelkina are the first Georgian athletes to ever win a medal at a Winter Olympic Games.

Berulava first emerged on the international scene to represent Georgia at the 2020 Winter Youth Olympics, where he and his partner Alina Butaeva won two medals − bronze in pairs and gold in the team event. He then formed a new partnership with Karina Safina. Safina/Berulava were the first Georgian pair medalists on the ISU Junior Grand Prix circuit, and the first Georgians to win a World Junior title in any discipline when they won gold in 2022. At the senior level they won a bronze medal at the 2021 CS Nebelhorn Trophy, achieved notable fourth-place finishes at both the 2022 World Championships and the 2022 European Championships, and represented Georgia at the 2022 Winter Olympics.

== Personal life ==
Berulava was born on 27 November 2002 in Moscow, Russia into a Georgian family. Berulava stated that “I was born in Moscow because my family had to leave Georgia during the war, but we always spoke Georgian at home. It's my first language.”

He is the godfather of fellow Georgian skater, Nika Egadze.

== Career ==
=== Early career ===
Berulava began learning to skate in 2005. In 2019, he teamed up with Alina Butaeva to compete in pair skating. The pair decided to train in Perm, coached by Pavel Sliusarenko and Alexei Menshikov. Despite training at facilities in Russia, at international competitions Berulava has only ever represented Georgia. Berulava has stated that he dreamed of competing for Georgia since he was a child and immediately accepted when the Georgian Figure Skating Federation made him an offer.

==== 2019–20 season: Debut of Butaeva/Berulava, Youth Olympics medals ====
The two made their debut for Georgia in September 2019, placing eighth at an ISU Junior Grand Prix (JGP) event in Poland and then sixth at JGP Croatia. Their results earned a spot for Georgia in the pairs' event at the 2020 Winter Youth Olympics. In November, they took bronze in the junior pairs' category at the Volvo Open Cup in Riga, Latvia. In December, they won the junior event at the Golden Spin of Zagreb.

In January 2020, the pair competed at the 2020 Winter Youth Olympics in Lausanne, Switzerland. They finished third in the short program behind two pairs from Russia, then did likewise in the free skating program. Their combined score put them in third place with a bronze medal. This was Georgia's first medal in the Winter Youth Olympic Games, and their tenth medal in the Youth Olympic Games overall. The pair also received a gold medal for their participation in the team event as part of Team Courage, alongside Arlet Levandi from Estonia, Ksenia Sinitsyna from Russia, and ice dancers Yoshida/Nishiyama from Japan. Butaeva/Berulava finished the season at the 2020 World Junior Championships, where they placed seventh.

=== Pair skating with Karina Safina ===
==== 2021–22 season: Debut of Safina/Berulava, Beijing Olympics, and World Junior champions ====
After the end of his partnership with Butaeva, Berulava formed a new partnership with Russian pair skater Karina Safina. With international junior competition resuming following the COVID-19 pandemic causing the 2020–21 junior season to be cancelled, Safina/Berulava made their Junior Grand Prix debut at the 2021 JGP Slovakia. they won the silver medal behind gold medal-winning Russian team Mukhortova/Evgenyev, and ahead of third place Russian team Kostiukovich/Briukhanov. Their placement marked Georgia's first Junior Grand Prix medal in pair skating.

Safina/Berulava next made their senior international debut at the 2021 CS Nebelhorn Trophy to attempt to qualify a berth for Georgia in the pairs event at the 2022 Winter Olympics. The team set a new personal best to win the short program by a narrow margin over German team Hase/Seegert. They fell to third in the free program after losing their forward inside death spiral and one of their lifts, and ultimately finished third overall to successfully qualify for an Olympic spot in their discipline for Georgia. Berulava remarked afterwards, "we would like to have done it in a better, nicer way." Their performance, along with Georgian ice dance team Kazakova/Reviya's podium placement, also qualified a spot for Georgia in the Olympic team event.

Safina/Berulava returned to the Junior Grand Prix circuit in October for their second assignment, the 2021 JGP Austria in Linz. They placed third in both segments to finish third overall behind Russian teams Khabibullina/Knyazhuk and Mukhortova/Evgenyev. Due to the unique qualification process for the 2021–22 season, the team did not advance to the 2021–22 Junior Grand Prix Final, despite two podium finishes.

In December, Safina/Berulava faced domestic rivals Metelkina/Parkman for the first time in international competition at the 2021 CS Golden Spin of Zagreb. Safina/Berulava set a new personal best to win the short program but fell to eighth in the free program standings after errors on their side-by-side jumping passes and losing their forward inside death spiral. The team placed seventh overall, while Metelkina/Parkman advanced onto the podium and took home the silver medal. Metelkina/Parkman initially received the nod for the Georgian pairs berth at the 2022 European Championships; however, Safina/Berulava replaced them after they withdrew from the event on 9 January. At Europeans, Safina/Berulava placed sixth in the short program after falling on their side-by-side triple Salchows. They delivered a stronger performance in the free skate, albeit still struggling with their side-by-side jumps, to climb to fourth in the segment and fourth overall, the best of the non-Russian competitors.

The day after the pairs free skate at the European Championships, Safina/Berulava were officially named to the Georgian team for the 2022 Winter Olympics by the Georgian Figure Skating Federation. Safina/Berulava made their Olympic debut in the team event before the opening ceremony on February 3. They cleanly skated their short program to place sixth in the segment out of nine and earn five points towards Team Georgia's combined score. However, despite scoring 22 team points overall to tie for fifth place with Team China going into the free skate, Team Georgia lost the tie-breaker and did not advance. In the pairs event, Safina/Berulava were ninth in the short program and eighth in the free skate, for ninth overall.

Days after the Olympics concluded, Vladimir Putin ordered an invasion of Ukraine, as a result of which the International Skating Union banned all Russian and Belarusian skaters from competing at the 2022 World Championships. As well, the Chinese Skating Association opted not to send athletes to compete in Montpellier. As those countries' athletes comprised the entirety of the top five pairs at the Olympics, this greatly impacted the field. Safina and Berulava relocated to train in Italy. They placed fourth in the short program at the World Championships with a clean skate. They were fourth in the free skate to finish fourth overall, the only error in the latter segment being Safina doubling out on a triple Salchow attempt.

Due to the pandemic, the World Junior Championships could not be held in their scheduled location of Sofia, and as a result, they were moved to Tallinn and held in mid-April, rather than their traditional early March timeframe. As Russian pair teams were also banned from attending this event, Safina/Berulava entered as heavy favourites for the gold medal. They won the short program with a clean skate and a 67.77 score. They also won the free skate, taking the title by a margin of almost twenty points. Berulava reflected that "it was a long and busy season with many competitions and to end it with a gold medal is really nice."

==== 2022–23 season: Grand Prix debut & injury struggles ====
Safina and Berulava were assigned to make their senior Grand Prix debut in the fall. Despite dealing with an injury in the lead-up to their first event, the 2022 Grand Prix de France, they placed third in the short program, with Safina saying, "I am more pleased than not pleased with our performance today because nothing really worked in practice for me. We have still a lot of work ahead of us, and I think I've done the maximum of what I can do at the moment." They struggled in the free skate, placing sixth in that segment and dropping to fifth overall. The team later withdrew from their second assignment, the 2022 Grand Prix of Espoo.

After missing most of the season, Safina/Berulava returned to compete at the 2023 World Championships, but struggled at the event and came nineteenth. The following month, Safina announced that Berulava had opted to end their partnership. He subsequently confirmed this, expressing "deep gratitude to Karina."

=== Pair skating with Anastasiia Metelkina ===
==== 2023–24 season: Debut of Metelkina/Berulava, European silver medal, and World Junior Champions ====
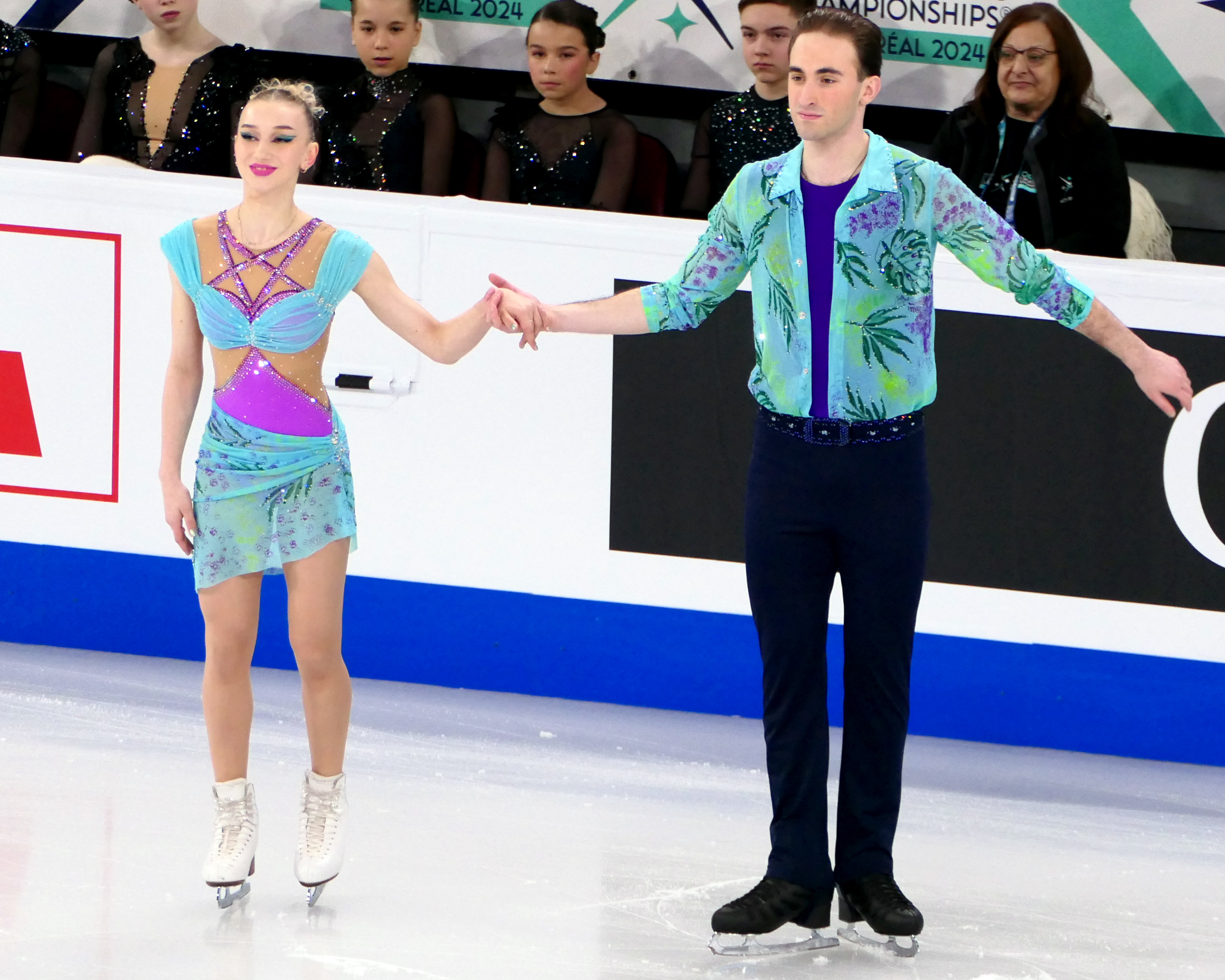
Metelkina and Berluava at the 2024 World Championships

On June 5, it was announced that Berulava had former a new partnership with Anastasiia Metelkina and that they would train in Perm, Russia under Pavel Sliusarenko, Egor Zukroev, and Maxim Trankov. Metelkina/Berulava opted to make their competitive debut on the Junior Grand Prix, winning the gold medal at the 2023 JGP Turkey in Istanbul. Despite two falls in their free skate, their margin of victory over American silver medalists Flores/Wang was almost 27 points. Two weeks later they earned the gold at their second event, the 2023 JGP Hungary in Budapest, despite difficulties on their jump elements. Metelkina/Berulava's results qualified them to the Junior Grand Prix Final in December; they said they planned on getting senior-level experience in the meantime.

Metelkina/Berulava made their senior debut at the Warsaw Cup, winning the gold medal. They then entered the Junior Grand Prix Final as heavy favourites to take the title, and won by a 34-point margin over Canadian silver medalists Kemp/Elizarov. They were the first Georgian pair team to win the Junior Grand Prix Final gold.

Entering the 2024 European Championships in Kaunas as among the favourites, Metelkina/Berulava took first place in the short program, winning a gold small medal. Metelkina erred on both of her jump sequences in the free skate, and they came fifth in that segment, dropping to second place overall. Berulava remarked that "not everything worked out. But it's only our first season together and silver is also a medal."

Having medaled at a senior championship event before returning to juniors, Metelkina/Berulava were heavy favourites at the 2024 World Junior Championships in Taipei, and won the short program by a margin of 9.20 points. They struggled in the free skate, with errors on all four jumping elements, but still finished first in that segment as well, and claimed the gold medal. Both vowed to work harder in training after the difficulties in the free program.

Making their senior World Championship debut as a team at the 2024 edition in Montreal, Metelkina/Berulava were fifth in the short program. They were only 0.08 points behind fourth-place Germans Hase/Volodin, thus narrowly missing participation in the final flight of the free skate. In that segment, they struggled with several errors, including an aborted lift, which saw them come tenth in the free skate and drop to seventh overall. Speaking afterward, a "despondent" Berulava said: "Right now, I don't have words to comment on this performance."

==== 2024–25 season: First Grand Prix gold, European bronze medal, and second World Junior gold medal ====
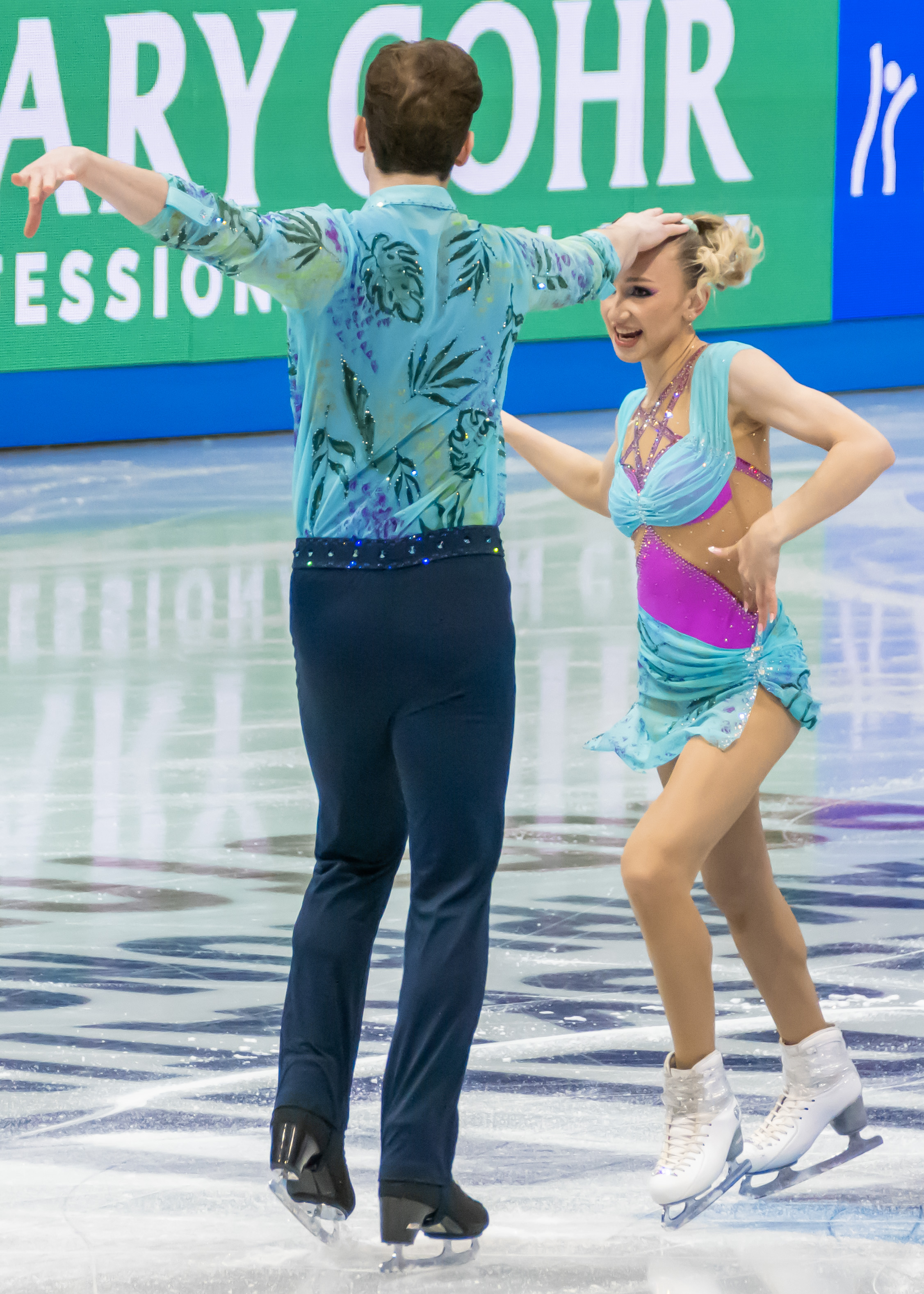
Metelkina and Berluava performing their short program at the 2025 World Championships

Metelkina/Berulava did not compete on the Challenger circuit at the start of the season, as he explained their belief that they had begun the prior season "too early," as a result of which "we ended up feeling exhausted by the time the most important tournaments came by." They began the Grand Prix at the 2024 Skate America, where they came third in the short program but dropped to fourth overall after a fourth-place free skate that featured multiple jump errors and a fall in their death spiral element. They missed the bronze medal by a fraction of a point, but Metelkina said that the "short margin to the bronze medal is not what really matters. The mistakes are what we have to improve and work on." At their second event, the 2024 NHK Trophy, Metelkina/Berulava won the gold medal, defeating reigning World champions Miura/Kihara in the process. This was the first Grand Prix medal of any colour for a Georgian pair team, of which Berulava said they were "just so proud." Shortly afterward, they competed at and won the 2024 CS Warsaw Cup.

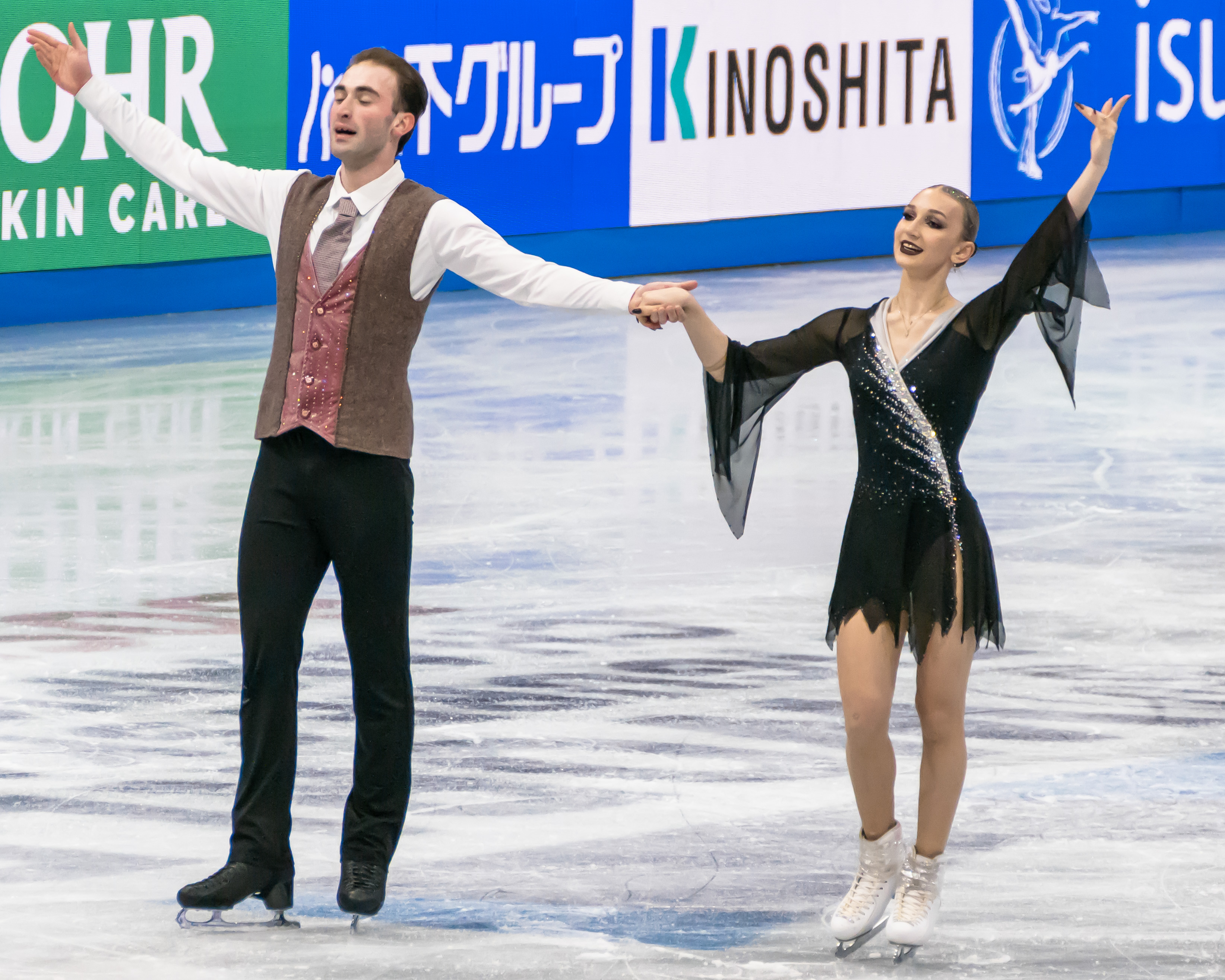
Metelkina and Berluava after their free skate at the 2025 World Championships

The team's results at their Grand Prix events qualified them for the Grand Prix Final in Grenoble. They were third in the short program with a new personal best score of 72.26 points. They were second in the free skate with the lone error being an underrotated jump by Metelkina, remaining third overall and taking the bronze medal. The following month at 2025 European Championships, Metelkina/Berulava entered as podium favourites, but came ninth in the short program after multiple errors, including an invalid death spiral. They rebounded in the free skate, coming third in that segment and rising to third overall for their second bronze medal at a major event of the season.

Metelkina/Berulava opted to return to the junior level to compete at the 2025 World Junior Championships in Debrecen, for which they were subject to some criticism in skating circles. Berulava defended the decision, noting that it was allowed by the ISU's rules, and citing a desire to gain competitive experience and World Standing points. They won both segments of the competition by a wide margin, taking their second consecutive World Junior title (and Berulava's third) by a margin of almost 27 points.

At the 2025 World Championships, they finished fourth in the short program, sixth in the free skate, and fourth overall. "Actually, we’re happy with the fourth place, considering what we did," said Berulava. "It was a long season, but due to the good preparation by our coaches, we are not feeling tired and exhausted. We still feel ready to go, and we’re actually really hoping to make the World Team Trophy.”

The team capped off the season with 2025 World Team Trophy where they placed third in both the short program and free skate, with Team Georgia taking sixth place overall. At this event, they earned a new personal best for both the short program and total score. “It feels easier to skate in this event as there is so much support,” said Metelkina. “We hope to get into the Olympic team event and this competition was a good practice. It was very important for us to be here.”

==== 2025–26 season: Milano Cortina Olympic Pairs silver, World silver, and European champions ====
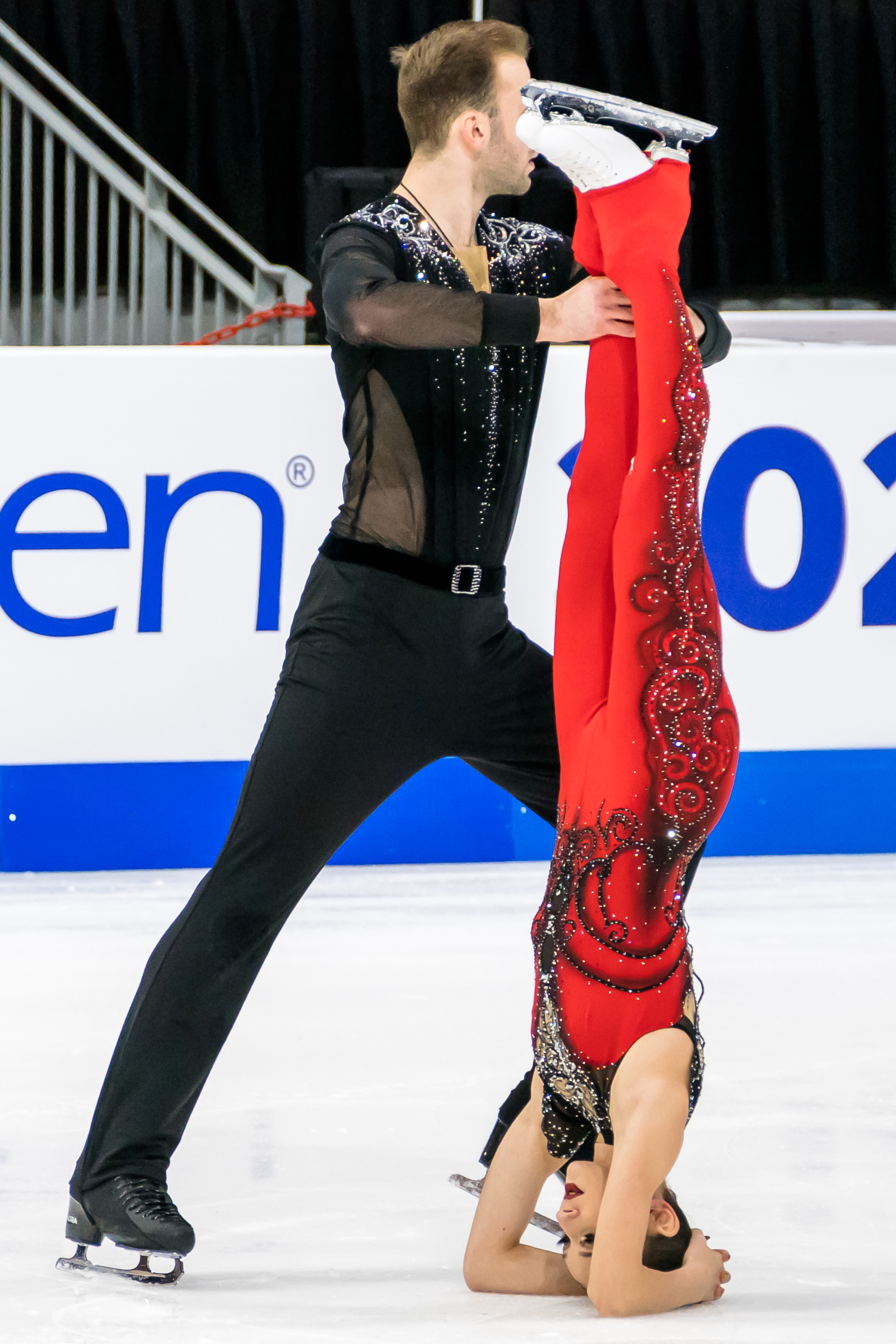
Metelkina and Berulava doing their opening pose for their short program at 2025 Skate America

Metelkina/Berulava opened the 2025–26 season in September at 2025 CS Kinoshita Group Cup where they earned the silver medal. The following month, they took gold at 2025 CS Trialeti Trophy.

Two weeks later, the team competed at 2025 Cup of China where they won their second individual Grand Prix gold. "Today was a rather difficult day," said Berulava after the free skate. "I'm glad we fought for this gold medal and didn't give up after the mistake on the jump."

The following month, Metelkina/Berulava took silver at 2025 Skate America. They placed first in the short program, but made costly mistakes in the free skate where they finished fourth. “Unfortunately, our performance today did not work out, but we will work hard,” said Berulava. “We want to improve, and we also will work on the mental side." After medaling in both Grand Prix events, they qualified for the 2025-26 Grand Prix of Figure Skating Final. “Now we will take a deep breath after this, and we will work on our mistakes,” Metelkina summed up. “And I'm also very pleased that the Final is in Japan. We always skate very well in Japan."

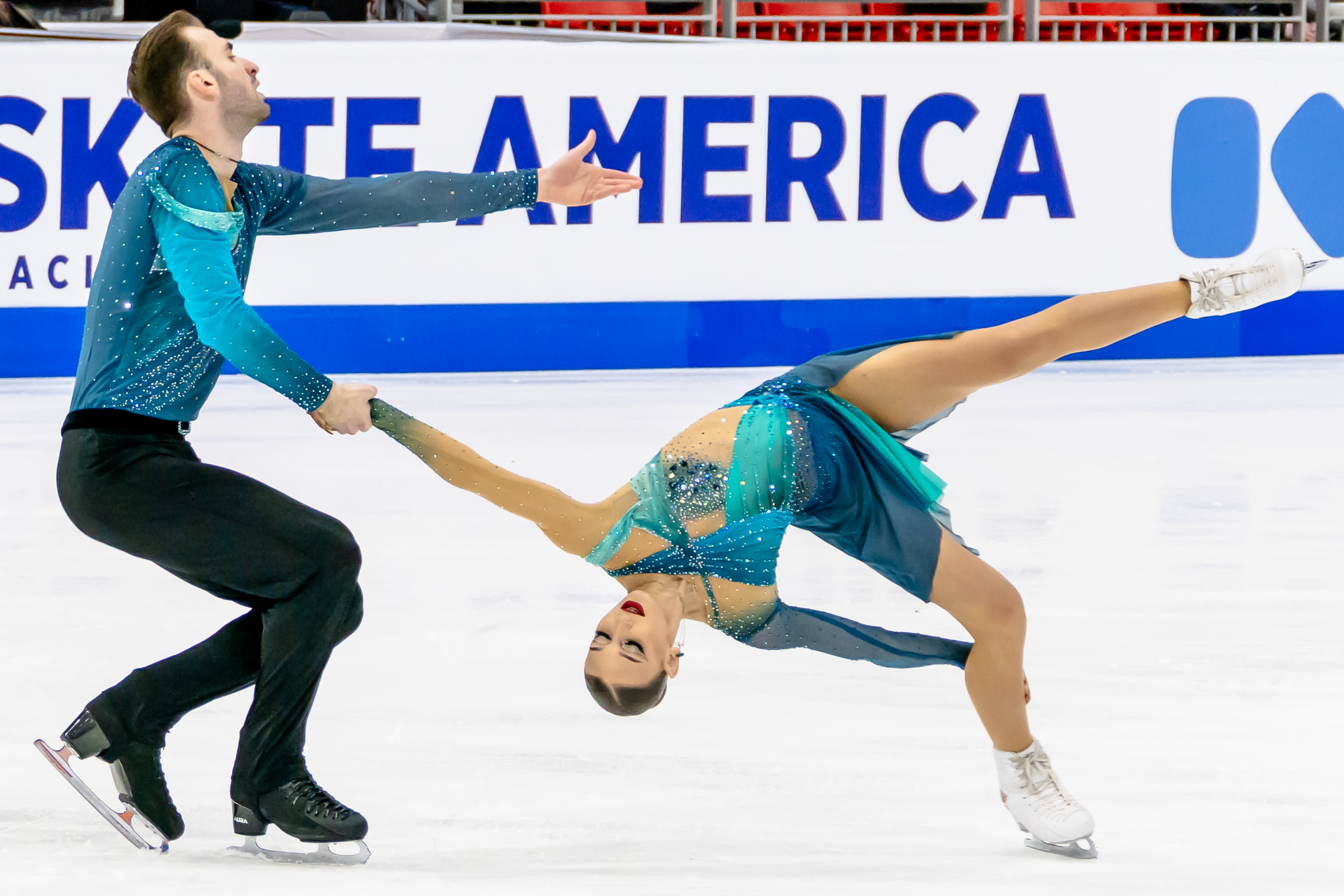
Metelkina and Berulava performing a death spiral during their free skate at 2025 Skate America

In December, Metelkina/Berulava finished fourth at the 2025–26 Grand Prix Final. They placed third in the short program and fourth in the free skate after a shaky lift. "The skate was OK, we made some mistakes," Berulava acknowledged. "After the Final we will go home and will train hard to win the Europeans."

The following month, the duo won the gold at the 2026 European Championships, becoming the first Georgian Pairs team to do so. "We are crazy happy to have won the European championships!" said Metelkina. "We’ve had the bronze, the silver, and now we finally got the gold medal. We couldn't be happier right now!" The team will compete next at the 2026 Winter Olympics. "Right now, the situation is very interesting," said Berulava of the upcoming Olympics. "It's fascinating because there's not a clear leader. There are six top teams and all together, and everyone is aiming for the gold medal. Each of us, each athlete, we all have the same goal." Later in the month, Berulava and ice dancer, Diana Davis, were announced to have been selected as the flag bearers for the opening ceremony at the upcoming Olympic Games.

On 6 February, Metelkina/Berulava placed second in the short program in the 2026 Winter Olympics Figure Skating Team Event. "It was a calm skate, a good warm up," said Metelkina. "We are confident and our coaches and our federation has confidence in us, too. We can do it all and practices were excellent. We had a very good week of training before the Olympic Games, therefore we went out calmly and did what we know we can do." Two days later, they placed second in the free skate and Team Georgia finished in fourth place overall.

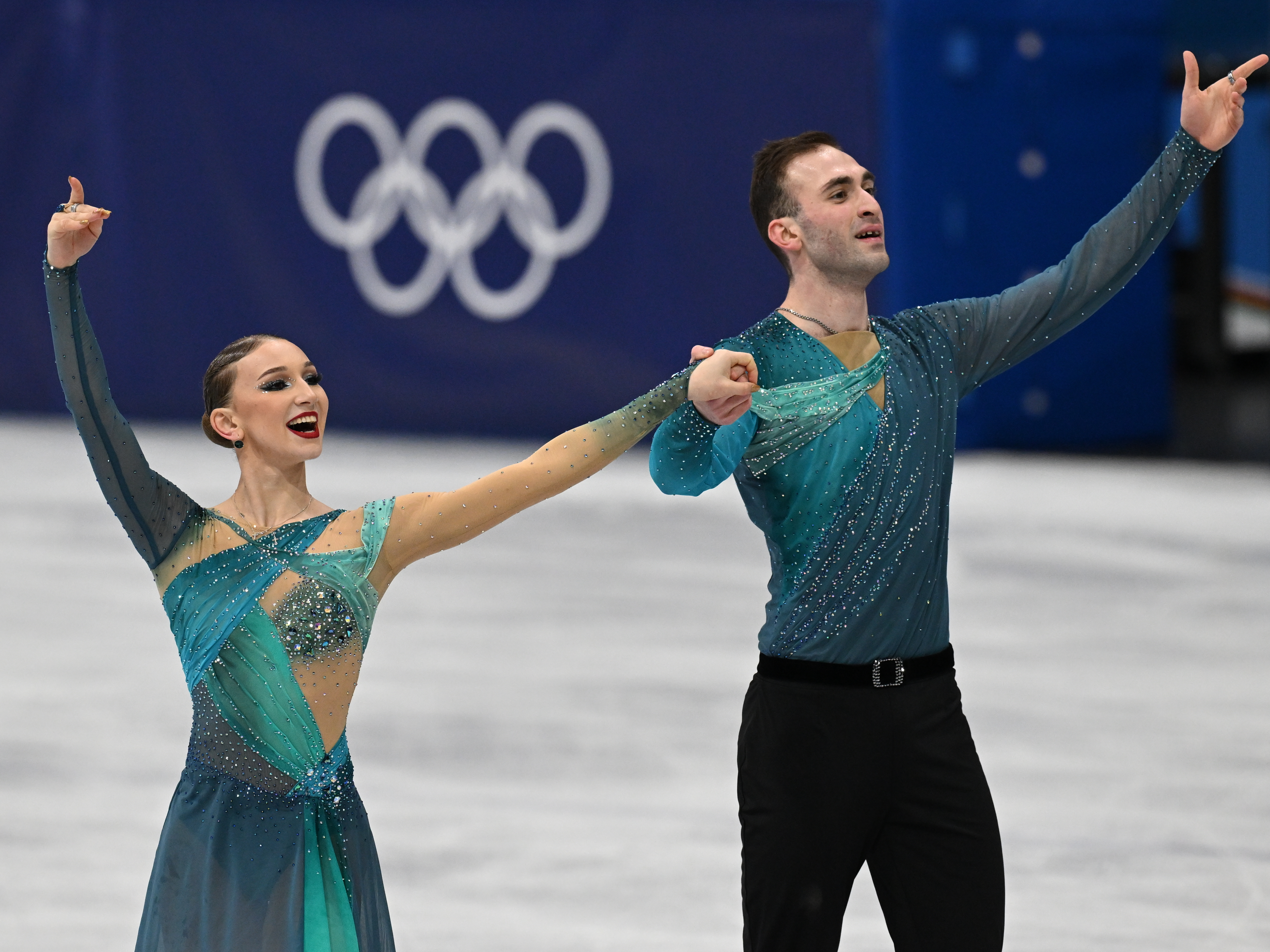
Berulava and Metelkina after their performance at the 2026 Winter Olympics

On 15 February, Metelkina/Berulava competed in the short program of the Pairs event. They placed second in the short program despite Metelkina stepping out of the throw triple flip. "I'm always a maximalist, so I'm not satisfied that I made a mistake on an element that is usually the most consistent for me,” said Metelkina. “I will try to do everything clean tomorrow. I'm absolutely satisfied with what my partner did today. I am also grateful about the great support my partner gave me." The following day, the pair skated a clean free program aside from Metelkina stepping out of the throw triple loop, placing second in that segment and winning the silver medal overall. With this result, Metelkina/Berulava made history as the first Georgian athletes to medal at a Winter Olympic Games. "It is a huge honor, and I am incredibly happy that our names are now written as the first Georgians to win a medal at the Olympic Winter Games. It's a huge honor. It was a long path for us, and we are unbelievably happy about it," said Berulava following the result. "I hope that after us, a big team will develop in Georgia — that we will have second, third, fourth pairs, and that there will be competition inside the country. After the end of my career, I want to take care of this, because I love figure skating and I want to do everything to develop pair skating in Georgia."

Berulava and alpine skier, Nino Tsiklauri, were subsequently selected as Georgia's flag bearers for the Olympic closing ceremony.

On March 26, 2026, Metelkina/Berulava made history by becoming the first Georgian pair team to earn a world medal (silver) at the 2026 World Figure Skating Championships. The pair placed second in the short program and fourth in the free skate. “I’m very happy because this is our first medal at the World Championships and also that we ended the season on a high note,” said Metelkina. “There’s a medal and there are a lot of emotions. This season, I really want to thank everybody who was part of our preparation—our coaches, our federation. We tried our best and we will continue to try our best.”

==== 2026–27 season ====
Metelkina/Berulava opened the 2026–27 season in September on home ice at 2026 CS Trialeti Trophy where they earned the gold medal. The following month, they took gold in their first Grand Prix event of the season at 2026 Grand Prix de France. Despite the win, Berulava was disappointed with their free skate. “What you saw from us today was bad,” he Berulava. “We can do much better and skate much cleaner. I don’t really feel like a winner right now, even though we won. We want to show a clean skate and a real fight in the future. We’ll keep working hard to achieve the best possible results.”

Two weeks later, Metelkina/Berulava competed at 2026 Cup of China where they placed second behind Anastasia Mishina and Aleksandr Galliamov. “We are very happy that we have qualified for the Grand Prix Final,” said Metelkina. “We have one month until the next competition, so we will work on our mistakes and prepare for the Final to the best of our ability. Overall, we are very pleased that we were able to compete here at the Grand Prix in China. We saw great fans, and there was a lot of support!”

== Programs ==
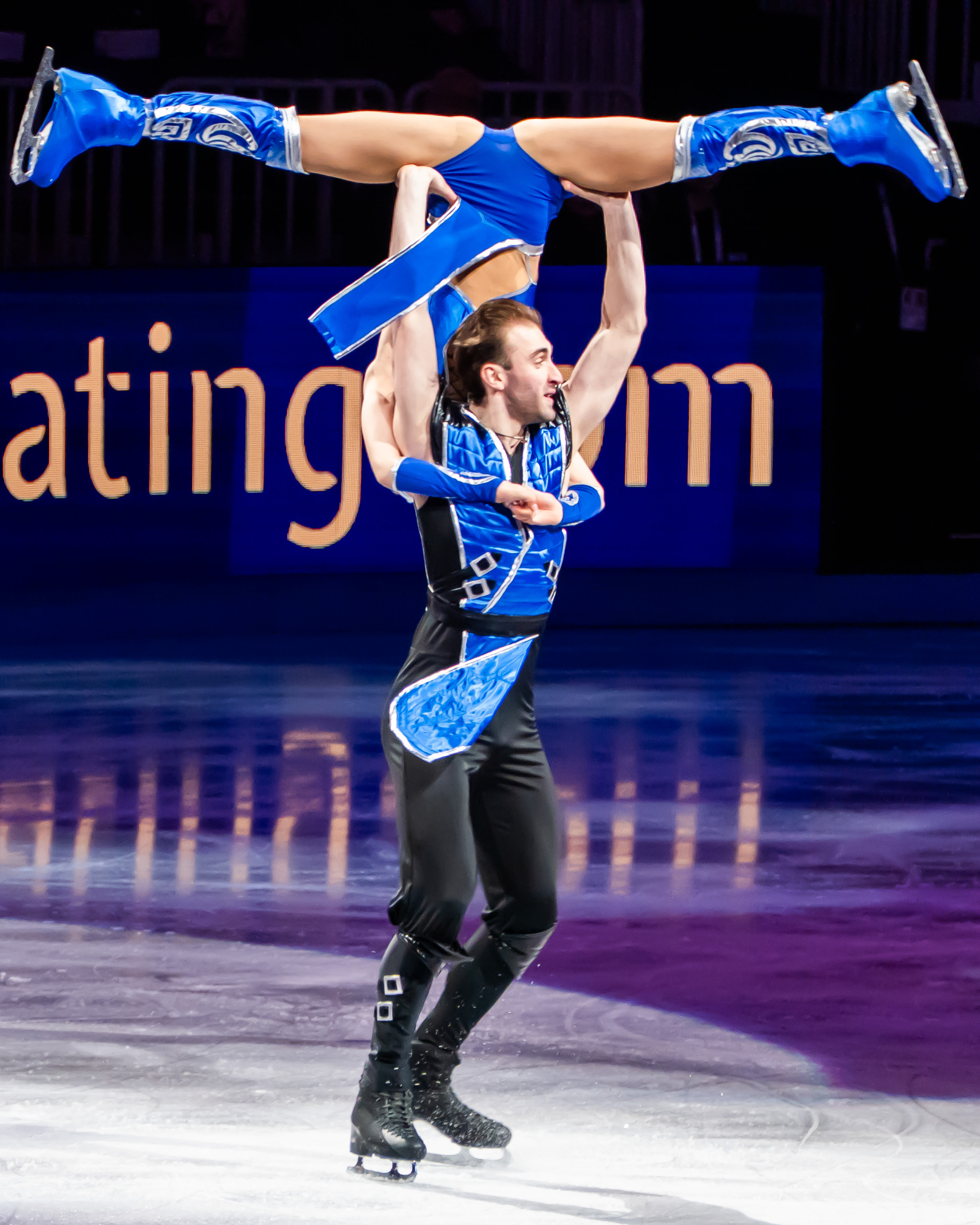
Metelkina and Berulava performing a pair lift during their exhibition program at the 2025 World Championships

=== Pair skating with Anastasiia Metelkina ===
Season	Short program	Free skate	Exhibition	Ref.
2023–24	"Summertime" (from Porgy and Bess) By George Gershwin, DuBose Heyward & Ira Gershwin Performed by Billy Stewart Choreo. by Sergei Plishkin & Ivan Malafeev	"The Millionaire Waltz" By Queen Choreo. by Sergei Plishkin & Ivan Malafeev	"Tango Sassetta" By Andreas Hinterseher & Martina Eisenreich	
2024–25	"Why?" By Bronski Beat Choreo. by Sergei Plishkin & Ivan Malafeev; "Summertime"	"A Necessary End" By Saltillo Choreo. by Sergei Plishkin & Ivan Malafeev	"Tango Sassetta"	
2024–25	"Why?" By Bronski Beat Choreo. by Sergei Plishkin & Ivan Malafeev; "Summertime"	"A Necessary End" By Saltillo Choreo. by Sergei Plishkin & Ivan Malafeev	"Techno Syndrome (Mortal Kombat)" (from Mortal Kombat) By The Immortals; "True" By Spandau Ballet	
2025–26	Boléro (Excerpt) By Maurice Ravel Performed by Miloš Karadaglić Choreo. by Sergei Plishkin & Ivan Malafeev	Le discours d'Arthur (from Le meilleur reste à venir) by Jérôme Rebotier; Keeping Me Alive (Acoustic) by Jonathan Roy Choreo. by Benoît Richaud	"Techno Syndrome (Mortal Kombat)" (from Mortal Kombat) By The Immortals; "True" By Spandau Ballet	
2026–27	EX Cathedra by Michal Smorawinski	The Feeling Begins by Peter Gabriel	Selections from Ratatouille (soundtrack) composed by Michael Giacchino	

=== Pair skating with Karina Safina ===
Season	Short program	Free skating	Exhibition
2022–2023	Danse macabre by Camille Saint-Saëns choreo. by Eteri Tutberidze, Daniil Gleikhengauz	Exogenesis: Symphony by Muse choreo. by Eteri Tutberidze, Daniil Gleikhengauz	SOS d'un terrien en détresse by Daniel Balavoine performed by Dimash Qudaibergen
2021–2022	Moonlight by Viper choreo. by Nikolai Morozov, Ivan Malafeev	In This Shirt by The Irrepressibles choreo. by Nikolai Morozov, Ivan Malafeev	Mahindj Var by Nodar Reviya

=== Pair skating with Alina Butaeva ===
Season	Short program	Free skating
2019–2020	O Fortuna (from Carmina Burana) by Carl Orff	D'Artagnan by Maxime Rodriguez

== Competitive highlights ==
- GP – Event of the ISU Grand Prix Series
- JGP – Event of the ISU Junior Grand Prix Series
- TBD – Assigned
- WD – Withdrew from competition
- Medals at team events are awarded for the team results only. Individual placements at team events are listed in parentheses.

=== Pair skating with Anastasiia Metelkina ===
Competition placements at senior level
Season	2023–24	2024–25	2025–26	2026–27
Winter Olympics			2nd	
Winter Olympics (Team event)			4th	
World Championships	7th	4th	2nd	
European Championships	2nd	3rd	1st	
Grand Prix Final		3rd	4th	TBD
World Team Trophy		6th (3rd)		
GP Cup of China			1st	2nd
GP NHK Trophy		1st		
GP Skate America		4th	2nd	
GP France				1st
CS Trialeti Trophy			1st	1st
CS Warsaw Cup	1st	1st		
CS Kinoshita Group Cup			2nd	
Challenge Cup		1st		

Competition placements at junior level
Season	2023–24	2024-25
World Junior Championships	1st	1st
Junior Grand Prix Final	1st	
JGP Hungary	1st	
JGP Turkey	1st	

=== Pair skating with Karina Safina ===
Competition placements at senior level
Season	2021–22	2022–23
Winter Olympics	9th	
Winter Olympics (Team event)	6th	
World Championships	4th	19th
European Championships	4th	
GP France		5th
CS Golden Spin of Zagreb	7th	
CS Nebelhorn Trophy	3rd	

Competition placements at junior level
Season	2021–22
World Junior Championships	1st
JGP Austria	3rd
JGP Slovakia	2nd

=== Pair skating with Alina Butaeva ===
Competition placements at junior level
Season	2019–20
Winter Youth Olympics	3rd
Winter Youth Olympics (Team event)	1st
World Junior Championships	7th
JGP Croatia	6th
JGP Poland	8th
Golden Spin of Zagreb	1st
Volvo Open Cup	3rd

== Detailed results ==
=== Pair skating with Anastasiia Metelkina ===
ISU personal best scores in the +5/-5 GOE System
Segment	Type	Score	Event
Total	TSS	225.20	2025 CS Trialeti Trophy
Short program	TSS	80.01	2026 CS Trialeti Trophy
Short program	TES	44.44	2025 Skate America
Short program	PCS	36.50	2026 CS Trialeti Trophy
Free skating	TSS	148.07	2025 CS Trialeti Trophy
Free skating	TES	77.98	2025 CS Trialeti Trophy
Free skating	PCS	72.35	2026 CS Trialeti Trophy

- Small medals for the short program and free skating are only awarded at ISU Championships.

==== Senior level ====
Results in the 2023–24 season
Date	Event	SP		FS		Total	
Date	Event	P	Score	P	Score	P	Score
Nov 16–19, 2023	(Poland) 2023 Warsaw Cup	1	66.93	1	137.08	1	204.01
Jan 8–14, 2024	(Lithuania) 2024 European Championships	1	71.30	5	124.84	2	196.14
Mar 18–24, 2024	(Canada) 2024 World Championships	5	72.02	10	117.28	7	189.30

Results in the 2024–25 season
Date	Event	SP		FS		Total	
Date	Event	P	Score	P	Score	P	Score
Oct 18–20, 2024	(United States) 2024 Skate America	3	68.64	4	122.79	4	191.43
Nov 8–10, 2024	(Japan) 2024 NHK Trophy	2	70.28	1	142.77	1	213.05
Nov 20–24, 2024	(Poland) 2024 CS Warsaw Cup	1	67.17	1	134.86	1	202.03
Dec 5–8, 2024	(France) 2024–25 Grand Prix Final	3	72.26	2	133.52	3	205.78
Jan 28 – Feb 2, 2025	(Estonia) 2025 European Championships	9	57.03	3	134.85	3	191.88
Feb 13–16, 2025	(Netherlands) 2025 Challenge Cup	1	70.58	1	133.34	1	203.92
Mar 25–30, 2025	(United States) 2025 World Championships	4	71.68	6	130.53	4	202.21
Apr 17–20, 2025	(Japan) 2025 World Team Trophy	3	73.67	3	139.96	6 (3)	213.63

Results in the 2025–26 season
Date	Event	SP		FS		Total	
Date	Event	P	Score	P	Score	P	Score
Sep 5–7, 2025	(Japan) 2025 CS Kinoshita Group Cup	2	75.32	2	137.58	2	212.90
Oct 8–11, 2025	(Georgia (country)) 2025 CS Trialeti Trophy	1	77.13	1	148.07	1	225.20
Oct 24–26, 2025	2025 Cup of China	1	77.77	1	139.47	1	217.24
Nov 14–16, 2025	(United States) 2025 Skate America	1	78.83	4	116.90	2	195.73
Dec 4–7, 2025	(Japan) 2025–26 Grand Prix Final	3	75.04	4	136.49	4	211.53
Jan 13–18, 2026	(United Kingdom) 2026 European Championships	1	75.96	1	139.80	1	215.76
Feb 6–8, 2026	(Italy) 2026 Winter Olympics – Team event	2	77.54	2	139.70	4	—N/a
Feb 6–19, 2026	(Italy) 2026 Winter Olympics	2	75.46	2	146.29	2	221.75
Mar 24–29, 2026	(Czech Republic) 2026 World Championships	2	79.45	4	138.96	2	218.41

Results in the 2026–27 season
Date	Event	SP		FS		Total	
Date	Event	P	Score	P	Score	P	Score
Oct 1-4, 2026	(Georgia (country)) 2026 CS Trialeti Trophy	1	80.01	1	135.82	1	215.83
Oct 23–25, 2026	2026 Grand Prix de France	1	77.34	1	127.31	1	204.65
Nov 6–8, 2026	2026 Cup of China	2	67.06	2	131.21	2	198.27

==== Junior level ====
Results in the 2023–24 season
Date	Event	SP		FS		Total	
Date	Event	P	Score	P	Score	P	Score
Sep 6–9, 2023	2023 JGP Turkey	1	67.92	1	113.45	1	181.37
Sep 20–23, 2023	2023 JGP Hungary	1	69.94	1	120.51	1	190.45
Dec 7–10, 2023	(China) 2023–24 Junior Grand Prix Final	1	70.48	1	131.63	1	202.11
Feb 26 – Mar 3, 2024	(Taiwan) 2024 World Junior Championships	1	71.53	1	107.79	1	179.32

Results in the 2024–25 season
Date	Event	SP		FS		Total	
Date	Event	P	Score	P	Score	P	Score
Feb 25 – Mar 2, 2025	(Hungary) 2025 World Junior Championships	1	69.18	1	121.83	1	191.01

=== Pair skating with Karina Safina ===
==== Senior level ====
2022–2023 season
Date	Event	SP	FS	Total
March 22–26, 2023	2023 World Championships	14; 60.98	20; 86.01	19; 146.99
November 4–6, 2022	2022 Grand Prix de France	3; 61.55	6; 100.99	5; 162.44
2021–2022 season
Date	Event	SP	FS	Total
March 21–27, 2022	2022 World Championships	4; 67.36	4; 124.38	4; 191.74
February 18–19, 2022	2022 Winter Olympics	9; 66.11	8; 126.33	9; 192.44
February 4–7, 2022	2022 Winter Olympics – Team event	6; 64.79	—	6T
January 10–16, 2022	2022 European Championships	6; 61.93	4; 122.12	4; 184.05
December 9–11, 2021	2021 CS Golden Spin of Zagreb	1; 66.95	8; 112.38	7; 179.33
September 22–25, 2021	2021 CS Nebelhorn Trophy	1; 66.46	3; 111.70	3; 178.16

==== Junior level ====
2021–2022 season
Date	Event	SP	FS	Total
April 13–17, 2022	2022 World Junior Championships	1; 67.77	1; 120.35	1; 188.12
October 6–9, 2021	2021 JGP Austria	3; 63.04	3; 116.23	3; 179.27
September 1–4, 2021	2021 JGP Slovakia	3; 57.64	2; 110.62	2; 168.26

=== Pair skating with Alina Butaeva ===
2019–2020 season
Date	Event	SP	FS	Total
2–8 March 2020	2020 World Junior Championships	7; 55.96	8; 97.21	7; 153.17
10–15 January 2020	2020 Winter Youth Olympics – Team	-	3; 100.70	1T/3P
10–15 January 2020	2020 Winter Youth Olympics	3; 59.14	3; 98.15	3; 157.29
4–7 December 2019	2019 Golden Spin	3; 51.32	1; 91.22	1; 142.54
5–10 November 2019	2019 Volvo Open Cup	3; 55.92	3; 100.62	3; 156.54
25–28 September 2019	2019 JGP Croatia	6; 51.27	5; 90.78	6; 142.05
18–21 September 2019	2019 JGP Poland	8; 45.29	9; 80.73	8; 126.02

Olympic Games
Preceded by Morisi Kvitelashvili and Nino Tsiklauri	Flagbearer for Georgia (with Diana Davis); Milano Cortina 2026	Succeeded by
