= 2025 CS Trialeti Trophy =

Figure skating competition in Georgia

- Type: ISU Challenger Series
- Date: 8 – 11 October
- Season: 2025–26
- Location: Tbilisi, Georgia
- Host: Georgian Figure Skating Union
- Venue: Ice Palace Tbilisi

Champions
- Men's singles: (Georgia (country)) Nika Egadze
- Women's singles: (Georgia (country)) Anastasiia Gubanova
- Pairs: (Georgia (country)) Anastasiia Metelkina and Luka Berulava
- Ice dance: (Georgia (country)) Diana Davis and Gleb Smolkin
- Next: 2026 CS Trialeti Trophy
- Previous CS: 2025 CS Denis Ten Memorial Challenge
- Next CS: 2025 CS Warsaw Cup

The 2025 Trialeti Trophy is a figure skating competition sanctioned by the International Skating Union (ISU), organized and hosted by the Georgian Figure Skating Union, and the eighth event of the 2025–26 ISU Challenger Series. It was held at the Ice Palace Tbilisi in Tbilisi, Georgia, from 8 to 11 October 2025. Medals were awarded in men's singles, women's singles, pair skating, and ice dance, and skaters earned ISU World Standing points based on their results. All of the champions were from Georgia: Nika Egadze in the men's event, Anastasiia Gubanova in the women's event, Anastasiia Metelkina and Luka Berulava in the pairs event, and Diana Davis and Gleb Smolkin in the ice dance event.

== Background ==
The ISU Challenger Series was introduced in 2014. It is a series of international figure skating competitions sanctioned by the International Skating Union (ISU) and organized by ISU member nations. The objective was to ensure consistent organization and structure within a series of international competitions linked together, providing opportunities for senior-level skaters to compete at the international level and also earn ISU World Standing points. The 2025–26 Challenger Series consists of eleven events, of which the Trialeti Trophy was the eighth.

== Changes to preliminary assignments ==
The International Skating Union published the preliminary list of entrants on 17 September 2025.

Discipline	Withdrew			Ref.
Discipline	Date	Country	Skater(s)	Ref.
Ice dance	15 September	Switzerland	Gina Zehnder; Beda Leon Sieber	
Men	1 October	Great Britain	Edward Appleby	
Men	1 October	South Korea	Lim Ju-heon	
Women	1 October	Switzerland	Kimmy Repond	
Women	1 October	Ukraine	Sofiia Hryhorenko	
Women	1 October	Ukraine	Taisiia Spesivtseva	
Pairs	1 October	Germany	Annika Hocke; Robert Kunkel	
Pairs	1 October	Italy	Rebecca Ghilardi; Filippo Ambrosini	
Ice dance	1 October	Italy	Noemi Maria Tali; Noah Lafornara	
Men	3 October	Austria	Maurizio Zandron	
Men	3 October	Chinese Taipei	Li Yu-Hsiang	
Women	3 October	Bulgaria	Alexandra Feigin	
Women	3 October	Japan	Wakaba Higuchi	
Pairs	3 October	Philippines	Isabella Gamez; Aleksandr Korovin	
Ice dance	3 October	Italy	Laura Finelli; Massimiliano Bucciarelli	
Men	6 October	Italy	Raffaele Francesco Zich	
Men	6 October	Kazakhstan	Dias Jirenbayev	
Women	6 October	Italy	Lara Naki Gutmann	
Women	6 October	Switzerland	Livia Kaiser	
Men	9 October	Japan	Sōta Yamamoto	
Pairs	10 October	Switzerland	Oxana Vouillamoz; Tom Bouvart	
Pairs	10 October	United States	Reagan Moss; Jakub Galbavy	

== Required performance elements ==
=== Single skating ===
Men and women competing in single skating first performed their short programs on Thursday, 9 October. Lasting no more than 2 minutes 40 seconds, the short program had to include the following elements:

For men: one double or triple Axel; one triple or quadruple jump; one jump combination consisting of a double jump and a triple jump, two triple jumps, or a quadruple jump and a double jump or triple jump; one flying spin; one camel spin or sit spin with a change of foot; one spin combination with a change of foot; and a step sequence using the full ice surface.

For women: one double or triple Axel; one triple jump; one jump combination consisting of a double jump and a triple jump, or two triple jumps; one flying spin; one layback spin, sideways leaning spin, camel spin, or sit spin without a change of foot; one spin combination with a change of foot; and one step sequence using the full ice surface.

Men performed their free skates on Friday, 10 October, while women performed theirs on Saturday, 11 October. The free skate performance for both men and women could last no more than 4 minutes, and had to include the following: seven jump elements, of which one had to be an Axel-type jump; three spins, of which one had to be a spin combination, one had to be a flying spin, and one had to be a spin with only one position; a step sequence; and a choreographic sequence.

=== Pairs ===
Couples competing in pair skating first performed their short programs on Friday, 10 October. Lasting no more than 2 minutes 40 seconds, the short program has to include the following elements: one pair lift, one double or triple twist lift, one double or triple throw jump, one double or triple solo jump, one solo spin combination with a change of foot, one death spiral, and a step sequence using the full ice surface.

Couples performed their free skates on Saturday, 11 October. The free skate performance can last no more than 4 minutes, and has to include the following: three pair lifts, of which one has to be a twist lift; two different throw jumps; one solo jump; one jump combination or sequence; one pair spin combination; one death spiral; and a choreographic sequence.

=== Ice dance ===
Couples competing in ice dance performed their rhythm dances on Thursday, 9 October. Lasting no more than 2 minutes 50 seconds, the theme of the rhythm dance this season was "music, dance styles, and feeling of the 1990s". Examples of applicable dance styles and music included, but were not limited to: pop, Latin, house, techno, hip-hop, and grunge. The rhythm dance had to include the following elements: one pattern dance step sequence, one choreographic rhythm sequence, one dance lift, one set of sequential twizzles, and one step sequence.

Couples then performed their free dances on Friday, 10 October. The free dance could last no longer than 4 minutes, and had to include the following: three dance lifts, one dance spin, one set of synchronized twizzles, one step sequence in hold, one step sequence while on one skate and not touching, and three choreographic elements.

== Judging ==
Skaters were judged according to the required technical elements of their program (such as jumps and spins), as well as the overall presentation of their program, based on three program components (skating skills, presentation, and composition). Each technical element in a figure skating performance was assigned a predetermined base point value and scored by a panel of nine judges on a scale from −5 to +5 based on the quality of its execution. Each Grade of Execution (GOE) from –5 to +5 was assigned a value as indicated on the Scale of Values. For example, a triple Axel was worth a base value of 8.00 points, and a GOE of +3 was worth 2.40 points, so a triple Axel with a GOE of +3 earned 10.40 points. The judging panel's GOE for each element was determined by calculating the trimmed mean (the average after discarding the highest and lowest scores). The panel's scores for all elements were added together to generate a Total Elements Score. At the same time, the judges evaluated each performance based on the five aforementioned program components and assigned each a score from 0.25 to 10 in 0.25-point increments. The judging panel's final score for each program component was also determined by calculating the trimmed mean. Those scores were then multiplied by the factor shown on the chart below; the results were added together to generate a total Program Component Score.

Program component factoring
Discipline	Short program or Rhythm dance	Free skate or Free dance
Men	1.67	3.33
Women	1.33	2.67
Pairs	1.33	2.67
Ice dance	1.33	2.00

Deductions were applied for certain violations, such as time infractions, stops and restarts, or falls. The Total Elements Score and Program Component Score were then added together, minus any deductions, to generate a final performance score for each skater or team.

== Medal summary ==
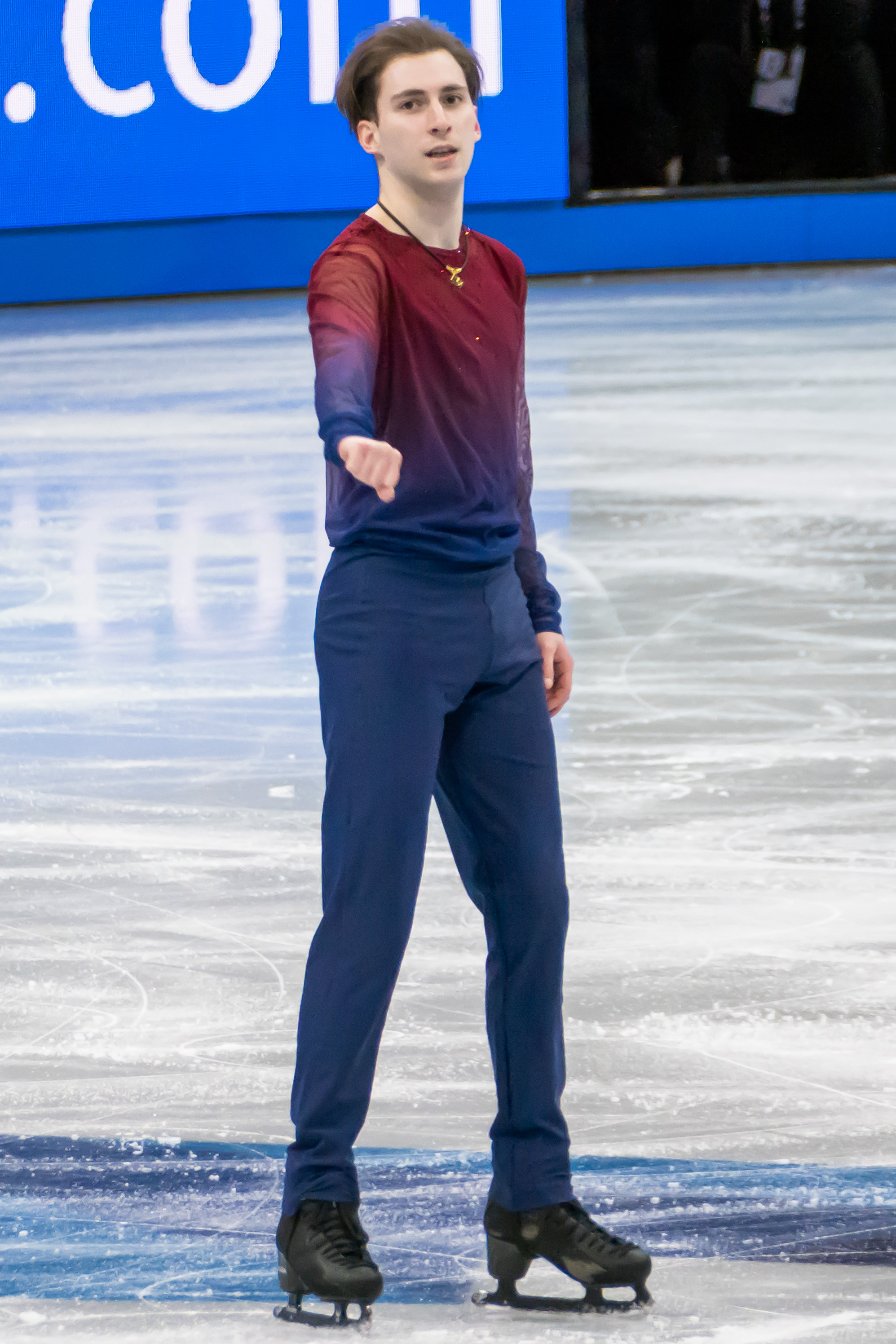
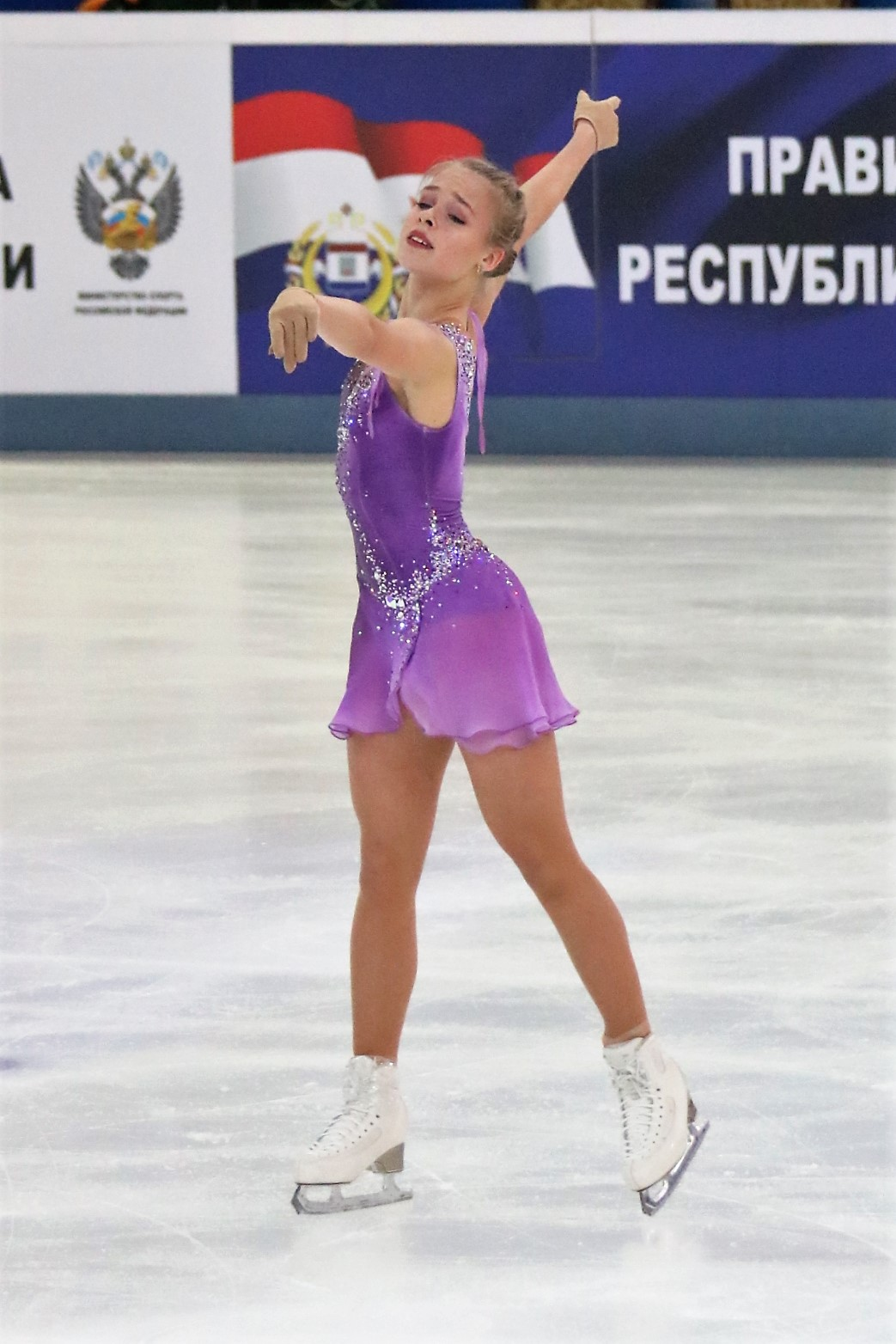
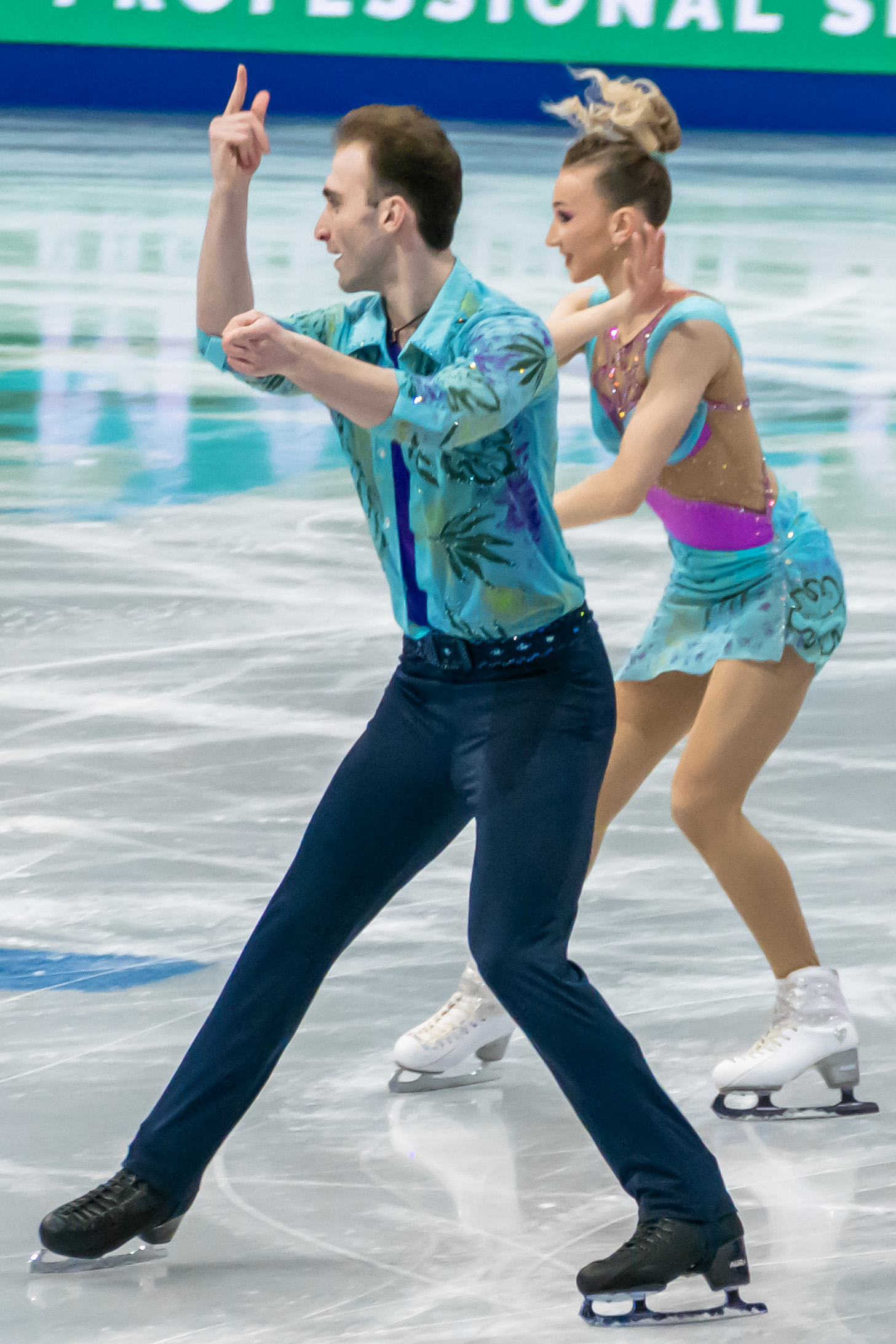
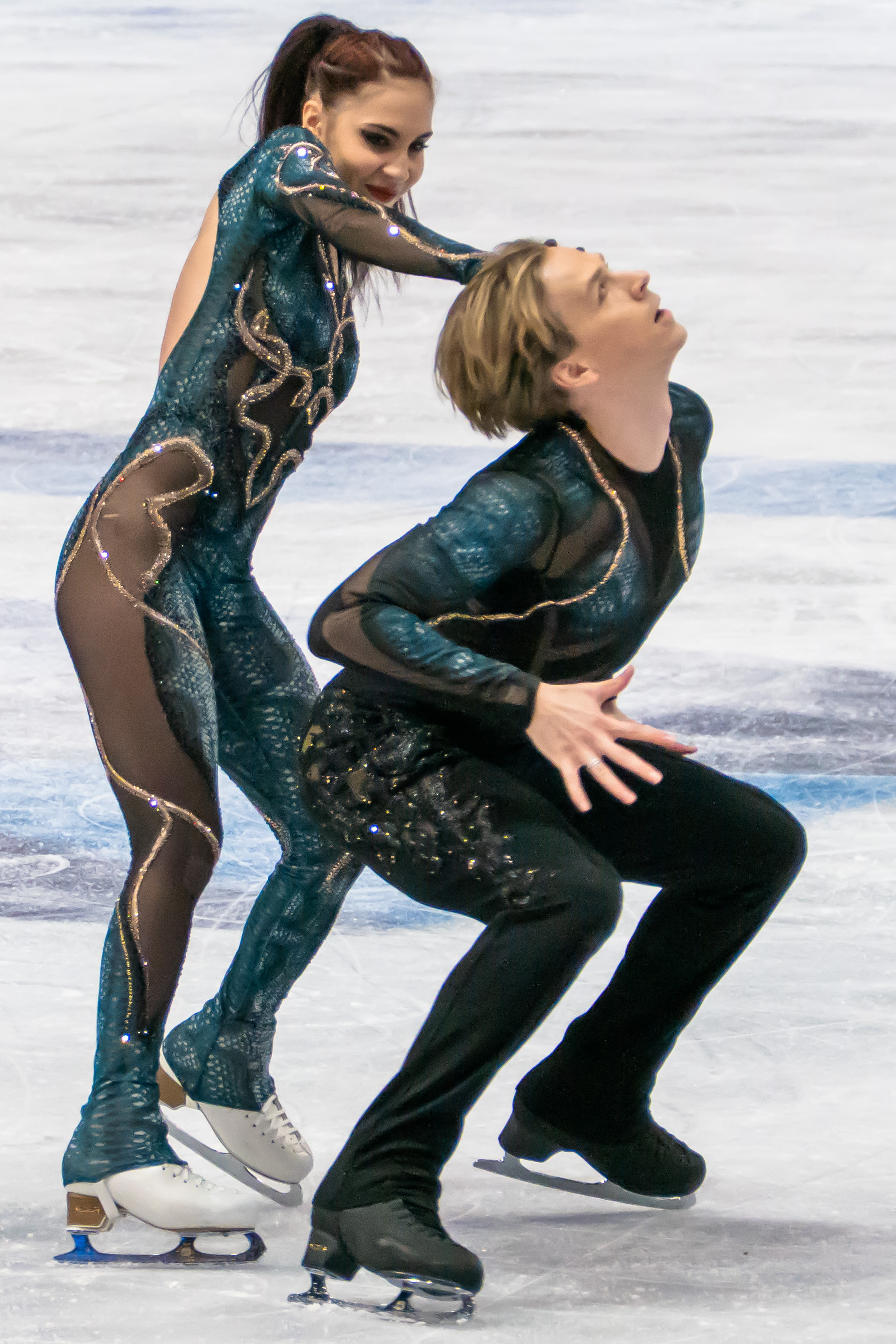
The 2025 Trialeti Trophy champions (all from Georgia): Nika Egadze (men's singles); Anastasiia Gubanova (women's singles); Anastasiia Metelkina and Luka Berulava (pair skating); and Diana Davis and Gleb Smolkin (ice dance)

Medalists
Discipline	Gold	Silver	Bronze
Men	(Georgia (country)) Nika Egadze	(United States) Jason Brown	(United States) Tomoki Hiwatashi
Women	(Georgia (country)) Anastasiia Gubanova	(Israel) Mariia Seniuk	(South Korea) Lee Hae-in
Pairs	(Georgia (country)); Anastasiia Metelkina; Luka Berulava	(Germany); Minerva Fabienne Hase; Nikita Volodin	(United States); Emily Chan; Spencer Akira Howe
Ice dance	(Georgia (country)); Diana Davis; Gleb Smolkin	(Australia); Holly Harris; Jason Chan	(France); Loïcia Demougeot; Théo le Mercier

== Results ==
=== Men's singles ===
Kyrylo Marsak of Ukraine was forced to withdraw prior to the free skate after he came down with food poisoning.

Men's results
Rank	Skater	Nation	Total points	SP		FS	
1st place, gold medalist(s)	Nika Egadze	Georgia	261.02	1	89.60	1	171.42
2nd place, silver medalist(s)	Jason Brown	United States	249.30	2	85.26	2	164.04
3rd place, bronze medalist(s)	Tomoki Hiwatashi	United States	237.11	5	79.55	3	157.56
4	Arlet Levandi	Estonia	223.53	8	72.70	4	150.83
5	Vladimir Samoilov	Poland	222.32	9	72.32	5	150.00
6	Lee Si-hyeong	South Korea	217.77	7	73.22	6	144.55
7	Daniel Martynov	United States	217.20	4	79.70	8	137.50
8	Vladimir Litvintsev	Azerbaijan	209.71	12	68.68	7	141.03
9	Aleksandr Selevko	Estonia	208.14	3	79.97	11	128.17
10	Donovan Carrillo	Mexico	205.05	10	70.92	9	134.13
11	Adam Hagara	Slovakia	192.46	6	78.94	12	113.52
12	Nikita Starostin	Germany	189.77	14	61.09	10	128.68
13	Georgii Reshtenko	Czech Republic	171.43	13	64.98	14	106.45
14	Pablo García	Spain	165.50	15	55.46	13	110.04
WD	Kyrylo Marsak	Ukraine	Withdrew	11	68.79	Withdrew from competition	

=== Women's singles ===
Women's results
Rank	Skater	Nation	Total points	SP		FS	
1st place, gold medalist(s)	Anastasiia Gubanova	Georgia	203.69	1	65.76	1	137.93
2nd place, silver medalist(s)	Mariia Seniuk	Israel	185.80	5	61.39	2	124.41
3rd place, bronze medalist(s)	Lee Hae-in	South Korea	183.28	3	62.10	3	121.18
4	Anna Pezzetta	Italy	178.13	2	64.32	7	113.81
5	Yun Ah-sun	South Korea	177.34	6	60.10	4	117.24
6	Kim Seo-young	South Korea	165.36	14	49.99	5	115.37
7	Rinka Watanabe	Japan	164.52	15	49.95	6	114.57
8	Iida Karhunen	Finland	162.31	7	56.73	12	105.58
9	Linnea Ceder	Finland	161.95	8	54.82	10	107.13
10	Ava Marie Ziegler	United States	161.48	16	49.22	8	112.26
11	Stefania Yakovleva	Cyprus	158.75	13	50.75	9	108.00
12	Starr Andrews	United States	158.38	4	61.65	15	96.73
13	Olivia Lisko	Finland	157.44	11	51.38	11	106.06
14	Nargiz Süleymanova	Azerbaijan	150.22	19	47.21	13	103.01
15	Nataly Langerbaur	Estonia	147.09	10	52.42	16	94.67
16	Meda Variakojytė	Lithuania	146.94	18	47.95	14	98.99
17	Kristina Lisovskaja	Estonia	141.79	17	49.03	17	92.76
18	Elizabet Gervits	Israel	141.79	12	51.22	18	90.57
19	Eliška Březinová	Czech Republic	141.18	9	53.25	19	87.93
20	Andrea Montesinos Cantú	Mexico	131.58	20	44.54	20	87.04
21	Sarah Marie Pesch	Germany	119.34	21	44.50	21	74.84
22	Sabina Alieva	Azerbaijan	96.12	22	39.92	23	56.20
23	Sofia Farafonova	Kazakhstan	93.33	23	29.20	22	64.13
24	Amina Alexeyeva	Kazakhstan	78.24	24	25.29	24	52.95
25	Russalina Shakrova	Kazakhstan	61.68	25	24.07	25	37.61

=== Pairs ===
Pairs results
Rank	Skater	Nation	Total points	SP		FS	
1st place, gold medalist(s)	Anastasiia Metelkina; Luka Berulava	Georgia	225.20	1	77.13	1	148.07
2nd place, silver medalist(s)	Minerva Fabienne Hase; Nikita Volodin	Germany	208.28	2	74.67	2	133.61
3rd place, bronze medalist(s)	Emily Chan; Spencer Akira Howe	United States	193.70	3	71.17	4	122.53
4	Karina Akopova; Nikita Rakhmanin	Armenia	188.85	4	65.14	3	123.71
5	Ellie Kam; Daniel O'Shea	United States	176.32	5	62.74	5	113.58
6	Ioulia Chtchetinina; Michal Wozniak	Poland	163.59	7	55.41	6	108.18
7	Lucrezia Beccari; Matteo Guarise	Italy	160.02	6	56.10	7	103.92
8	Letizia Roscher; Luis Schuster	Germany	148.10	9	52.86	8	95.24
9	Louise Ehrhard; Matthis Pellegris	France	140.41	10	51.23	9	89.18
WD	Daria Danilova; Michel Tsiba	Netherlands	Withdrew	8	55.20	Withdrew from competition	

=== Ice dance ===
Ice dance results
Rank	Skater	Nation	Total points	RD		FD	
1st place, gold medalist(s)	Diana Davis; Gleb Smolkin	Georgia	203.39	1	80.35	1	123.04
2nd place, silver medalist(s)	Holly Harris; Jason Chan	Australia	180.84	4	69.88	2	110.96
3rd place, bronze medalist(s)	Loïcia Demougeot; Théo le Mercier	France	178.09	2	71.49	3	106.60
4	Phebe Bekker; James Hernandez	Great Britain	174.37	3	70.27	4	104.10
5	Utana Yoshida; Masaya Morita	Japan	167.96	5	69.69	7	98.27
6	Célina Fradji; Jean-Hans Fourneaux	France	165.37	6	64.17	5	101.20
7	Zoe Larson; Andrii Kapran	Ukraine	161.77	7	62.11	6	99.66
8	Samantha Ritter; Daniel Brykalov	Azerbaijan	150.39	11	56.83	8	93.56
9	Maria Kazakova; Vladislav Kasinskij	Georgia	146.75	12	56.63	9	90.12
10	Angelina Kudryavtseva; Ilia Karankevich	Cyprus	144.47	10	57.86	11	86.61
11	Sofiia Dovhal; Wiktor Kulesza	Poland	142.94	8	59.62	13	83.32
12	Maxine Weatherby; Oleksandr Kolosovskyi	Azerbaijan	142.71	13	55.92	10	86.79
13	Karla Maria Karl; Kai Hoferichter	Germany	140.78	9	59.10	14	81.68
14	Natalia Pallu-Neves; Jayin Panesar	Brazil	136.44	14	50.24	12	86.20
15	Emese Csiszér; Mark Shapiro	Hungary	127.32	15	49.92	15	77.40

== Works cited ==
- "Special Regulations & Technical Rules – Single & Pair Skating and Ice Dance 2024" (PDF). International Skating Union. Archived (PDF) from the original on 3 June 2025.
