= The Best Is Yet to Come (2019 film) =

- French: Le meilleur reste à venir
- Directed by: Matthieu Delaporte; Alexandre de la Patellière
- Written by: Matthieu Delaporte; Alexandre de la Patellière
- Produced by: Dimitri Rassam
- Starring: Fabrice Luchini; Patrick Bruel
- Cinematography: Guillaume Schiffman
- Edited by: Célia Lafitedupont; Sarah Ternat
- Music by: Jérôme Rebotier
- Production companies: Chapter 2 Fargo Films; M6 Films; Pathé; CN8 Productions
- Release date: October 21, 2019
- Running time: 117 minutes
- Country: France
- Language: French
- Box office: $7.6 million

The Best Is Yet to Come (French: Le meilleur reste à venir) is a 2019 French comedy-drama film written and directed by Matthieu Delaporte and Alexandre de la Patellière.

== Plot ==
Arthur and César are two childhood friends, very close despite very different personalities. One is a rather good student, homebody and happy in the household, despite a divorce. The other leads a disjointed life but remains positive. Following an accident, Caesar uses Arthur's social security coverage because Caesar does not have any. Arthur discovers while reading the results that his friend has only a few months left to live. He prepares to tell him but Caesar remains convinced that it is Arthur who is ill. Despite great financial problems, César will then lead his friend on crazy adventures in order to enjoy the rest of his life.

== Cast ==
- Fabrice Luchini as Arthur Dreyfus
- Patrick Bruel as César Montesiho
- Pascale Arbillot as Virginie, Arthur's ex-wife
- Marie Narbonne as Julie, Arthur and Virginie's daughter
- Jean-Marie Winling as Bernard Montesiho, Caesar's father
- André Marcon as the priest
- Zineb Triki as Randa Ameziane
- Thierry Godard as doctor Cerceau
- Martina Garcia as Lucia
- Sébastien Pierre as teacher Lansky
- Philippe Résimont as Codaven, the director of the lab
- Rajat Kapoor as doctor Aman Kapoor
- Marie-Julie Baup as the woman with the cigarette
- Lilou Fogli as the employee at the emergency
- Adele Simphal as the student

== Remakes ==
A German-language remake, titled Das Beste Kommt Noch!, was released in 2023. It was directed by Til Schweiger who also took on the role of Felix, while Michael Maertens played Arthur.

An American remake, also titled The Best Is Yet To Come, starring Matthew Broderick, Alan Ruck, and directed by Jon Turteltaub commenced filming in British Columbia in August 2025. The release date has yet to be announced.
