= Alina Zagitova =

Russian figure skater (born 2002)

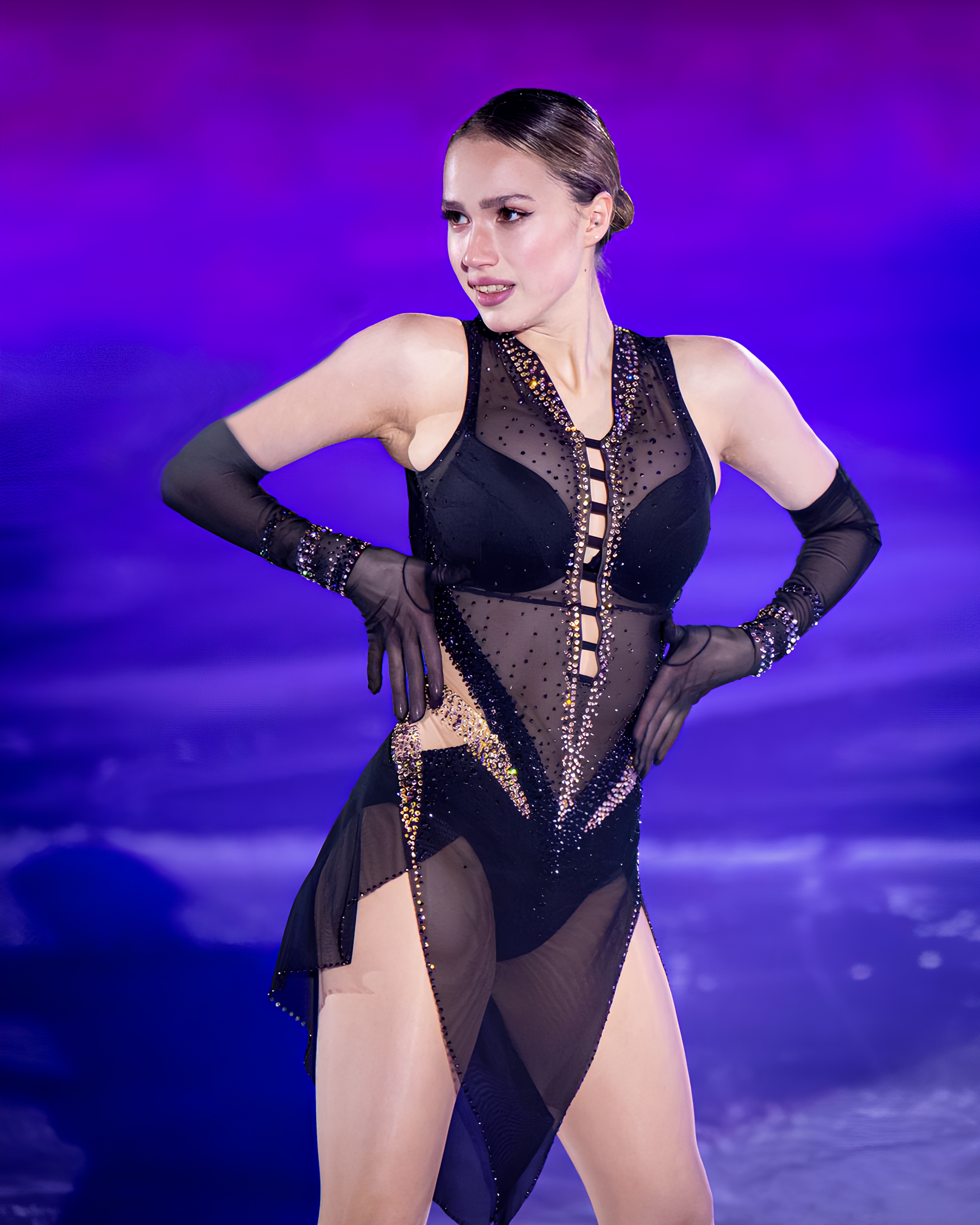
- Zagitova in 2024

Personal information
- Native name: Алина Ильназовна Загитова
- Full name: Alina Ilnazovna Zagitova
- Born: 18 May 2002 (age 24) Izhevsk, Udmurtia, Russia
- Home town: Moscow, Russia
- Height: 1.60 m (5 ft 3 in)

Figure skating career
- Country: Russia
- Discipline: Women's singles
- Coach: Eteri Tutberidze; Sergei Dudakov; Daniil Gleikhengauz
- Skating club: Sambo-70
- Began skating: 2008
- Competitive: 2015–20
- Highest WS: 1st (2018–19)

Medal record
Event	Gold medal – first place	Silver medal – second place	Bronze medal – third place
Olympic Games	1	1	0
World Championships	1	0	0
European Championships	1	1	0
Grand Prix Final	1	1	0
Russian Championships	1	1	0
World Junior Championships	1	0	0
Junior Grand Prix Final	1	0	0
Medal list
Olympic Games
Gold medal – first place	2018 Pyeongchang	Singles
Silver medal – second place	2018 Pyeongchang	Team
World Championships
Gold medal – first place	2019 Saitama	Singles
European Championships
Gold medal – first place	2018 Moscow	Singles
Silver medal – second place	2019 Minsk	Singles
Grand Prix Final
Gold medal – first place	2017–18 Nagoya	Singles
Silver medal – second place	2018–19 Vancouver	Singles
Russian Championships
Gold medal – first place	2018 Saint Petersburg	Singles
Silver medal – second place	2017 Chelyabinsk	Singles
World Junior Championships
Gold medal – first place	2017 Taipei	Singles
Junior Grand Prix Final
Gold medal – first place	2016–17 Marseille	Singles

Alina Ilnazovna Zagitova (Russian: Алина Ильназовна Загитова, IPA: [ɐˈlʲinə zɐˈɡʲitəvə]; born 18 May 2002) is a Russian former competitive figure skater. She is the 2018 Olympic champion, the 2019 World champion, the 2018 European champion, 2017–18 Grand Prix Final champion, and the 2018 Russian national champion. She also won a silver medal in the team event at the 2018 Winter Olympics. Earlier in her career, she won gold at the 2017 World Junior Championships and at the 2016–17 Junior Grand Prix Final.

Having won all major International Skating Union (ISU) Championship titles at the junior and senior levels, Zagitova is the youngest and second women's singles skater, after Yuna Kim, to have completed a Super Slam. She is the second-youngest Olympic champion in women's single skating, behind Tara Lipinski. She holds the historical world record score in the women's short program. She was known for back-loading her programs, meaning she performed all jumps in the second half to receive a bonus on the jump's base value. This led to the ISU implementing a rule limiting the number of jumps that could receive the base value bonus, unofficially known as the "Zagitova rule".

During the 2019–20 season, Zagitova announced she would be taking a break from competitive figure skating, and as of 2025, has not returned to competition. Since then, she has co-hosted multiple seasons of the Channel One Russia show Ice Age and has done commentary and interviews at Russian figure skating competitions.

== Early life ==
Zagitova was born on 18 May 2002 in Izhevsk, Udmurtia. She is the daughter of Leysan and Ilnaz Zagitov (ru), both Volga Tatars. Ilnaz Zagitov is an ice hockey coach from Tatarstan. Zagitova understands the Tatar language but does not speak it. She has a younger sister, Sabina, who was also a figure skater. She was nameless for a year until her parents decided to name her "Alina" after watching Russian rhythmic gymnast Alina Kabaeva.

When Zagitova was born, her father was playing hockey for the club Neftyanik Leninogorsk and taught her how to skate. The family moved to Almetyevsk when her father signed to play for Neftyanik Almetyevsk. Alina began skating at age four in Almetyevsk and was coached by Damira Pichugina. After the family moved back to Izhevsk, she started training with coach Natalia Antipina. She moved to Moscow at age 13 alongside her grandmother to train under Eteri Tutberidze.

== Career ==
=== Early years ===
Zagitova began learning triple jumps after moving to Moscow, but she broke her arm and then her leg. Eteri Tutberidze then kicked her out of her training group but decided to bring her back. In January 2016, Zagitova made her debut at the Russian Junior Championships and finished ninth. One month later, she finished fourth in the junior division at the 2016 Russian Cup Final.

=== 2016–17 season: World Junior champion ===
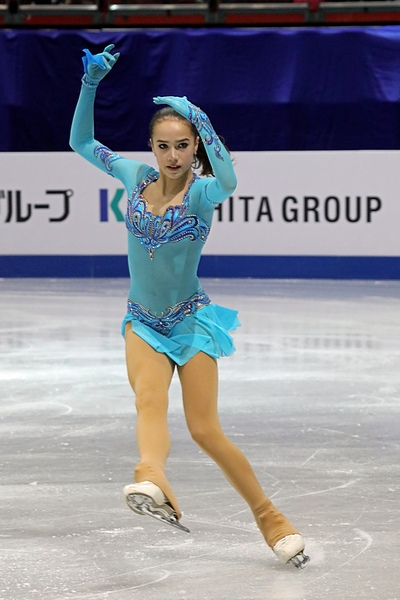
Zagitova performing at the 2017 Junior World Championships

Tutberidze and Daniil Gleikhengauz choreographed a short program to music from Samson and Delilah and a free skate to music from Don Quixote for Zagitova's first international season. She began performing all of her jumps in the second half of the program to earn bonus points on the base value, giving her a major technical advantage over her competitors.

Zagitova's international debut came in late August 2016 at the 2016–17 ISU Junior Grand Prix (JGP) competition in Saint-Gervais-les-Bains, France. She ranked first in both segments and won the gold medal ahead of Japan's Kaori Sakamoto. Her total score at the event, 194.37 points, was the second highest ever achieved by a women's single skater on the junior level, behind only Polina Tsurskaya. She then won the bronze medal at the JGP event in Slovenia, behind Japanese skaters Rika Kihira and Marin Honda. The results qualified her for the 2016–17 Junior Grand Prix Final, held in December in Marseille. There, Zagitova ranked first in both segments and won the gold medal with a total of 207.43 points, 13 points above silver medalist Anastasiia Gubanova. She became the first junior women's skater in history to have a total score above the 200 point mark.

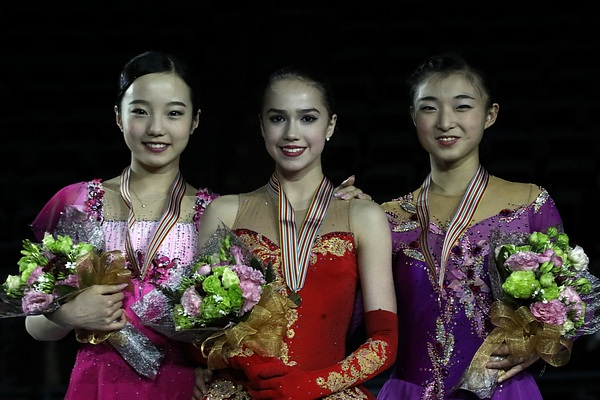
Zagitova (centre) with Marin Honda (left) and Kaori Sakamoto (right) on the 2017 World Junior Championships podium

Competing at the senior level in late December, Zagitova ranked third in the short program and second in the free skate at the 2017 Russian Championships, winning the silver medal behind her training partner, Evgenia Medvedeva. In February, she won the gold medal at the Russian Junior Championships and was assigned to compete at the 2017 European Youth Olympic Festival. There, she won the gold medal by nearly 60 points ahead of Ukraine's Anastasia Gozhva. At the 2017 World Junior Championships in Taipei, Zagitova performed two clean programs and won the gold medal. She set the new junior world record scores in both the free skate and combined total.

=== 2017–18 season: Olympic and European champion ===
Zagitova became age-eligible for senior international competitions in the 2017–18 season. In May 2017, she confirmed she would be moving up to the senior level. Zagitova and her coaches decided to keep her Don Quixote free skate from the prior season, but she had a new short program to music from the Black Swan and Moonlight soundtracks. She made her senior international debut at the 2017 CS Lombardia Trophy and won, after placing third in the short program but first in the free skate, with a total score of 218.46.

For the 2017–18 Grand Prix Season, Zagitova was assigned to two events, Cup of China and Internationaux de France. At the Cup of China, she was fourth after falling in the short program, but she rallied to win the free skate and won the gold medal overall. At the Internationaux de France, she placed fifth in the short program after a fall on her triple Lutz and several under-rotation deductions. However, she placed first in the free skate with a new personal best score of 151.34 and won the gold medal. Her results qualified her for the 2017–18 Grand Prix Final. There, she scored a personal best in the short program, 76.27, and was in second place behind Kaetlyn Osmond heading into the free skate. She placed first in the free skate and received a personal best overall competition score of 223.30, becoming the 2017–18 Grand Prix Final champion.

Zagitova won the 2018 Russian Championships, finishing first in both segments for a total score of 233.59 points. At the 2018 European Championships in Moscow, she won the title over Medvedeva, who had remained unbeaten for more than two years. The following day, Zagitova was named to the Russian Olympic team alongside Medvedeva and Maria Sotskova.

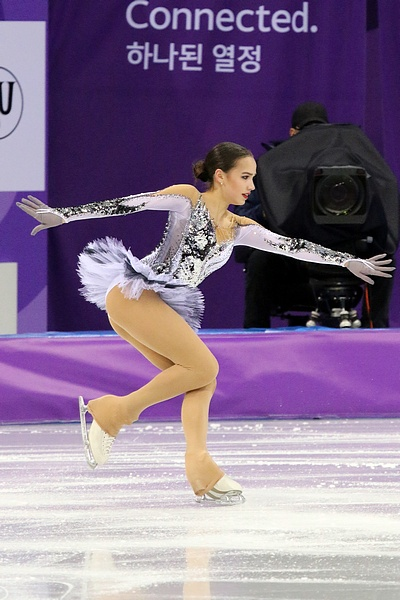
Short program

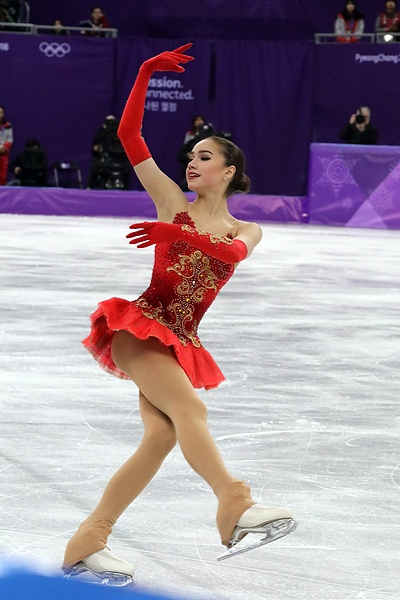
Free skate

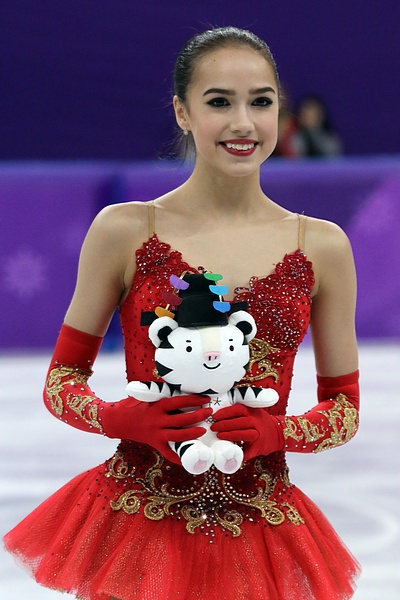
Award ceremony

Zagitova at the 2018 Winter Olympics in South Korea

At the 2018 Winter Olympics, Zagitova was selected to compete in the free skate during the team event. She finished in first place with a new personal best score of 158.08, only 2.38 points away from Medvedeva's world record. She earned 10 points for the Olympic Athletes from Russia, who won the silver medal behind Canada. In the individual event, Zagitova skated a clean short program and posted a world record score of 82.92, beating the previous record of 81.61 that Medvedeva had posted earlier that evening. In the free skate, she missed the planned triple loop after her first triple Lutz, but she successfully added the combination to her second Lutz. Zagitova and Medvedeva both scored 156.65 points in the free skate, but Zagitova came out ahead thanks to her higher score in the short program. She won the gold medal in the event at the age of 15 years and 281 days, becoming the second-youngest Olympic champion in women's singles by 28 days behind Lipinski.

After the Olympic Games, Zagitova competed at the 2018 World Championships in Milan. In the short program, she placed second to Carolina Kostner, but she fell three times in the free skate and only finished fifth overall. This was her only loss of the season.

=== 2018–19 season: World champion ===
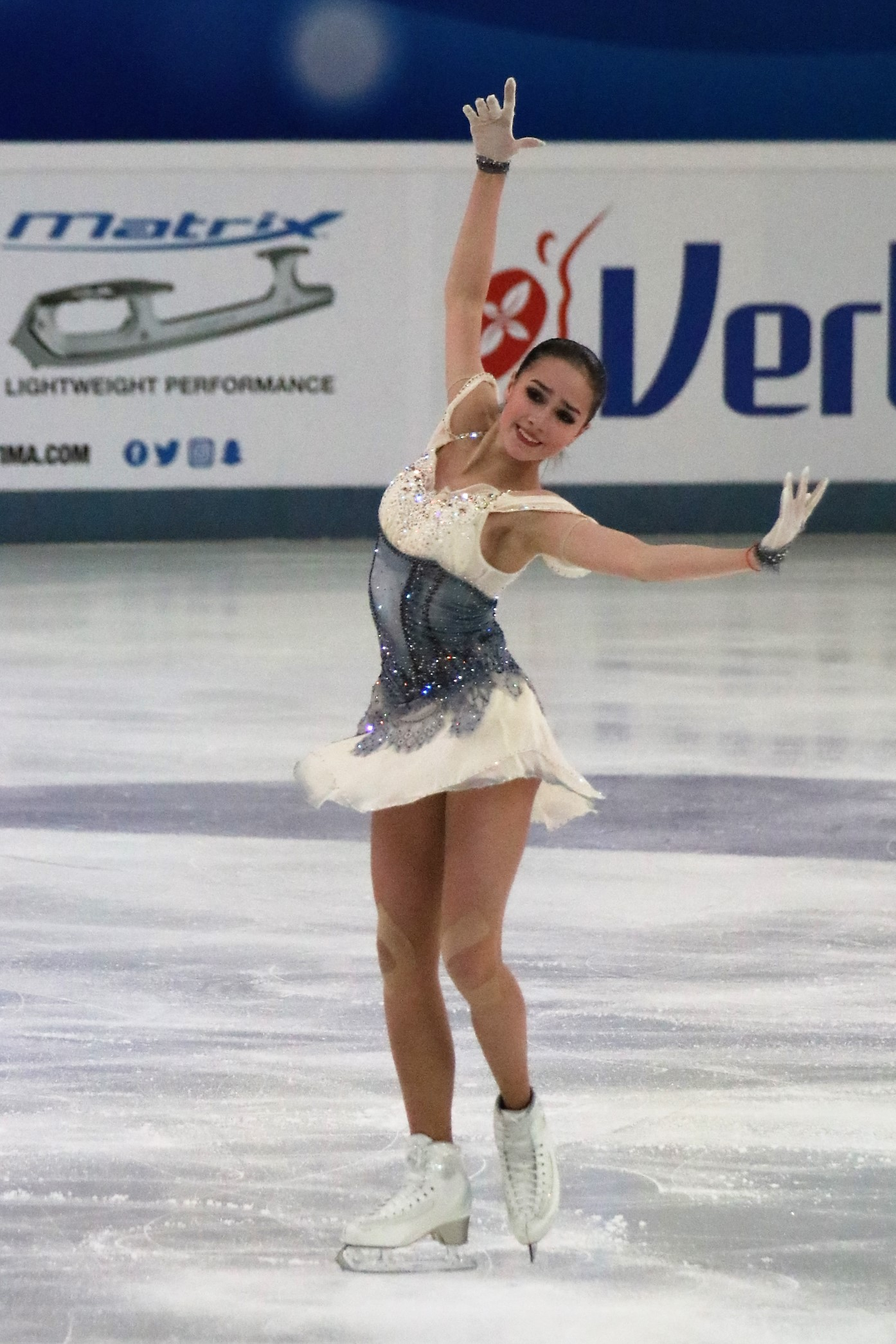
Zagitova performing her short program at the 2019 Russian Championships

Zagitova entered the 2018–19 season with two new programs: a short program to music from The Phantom of the Opera and a free skate to music from Carmen Suite. She was scheduled to begin the season at the 2018 CS Ondrej Nepela Trophy in Slovakia, but she could not travel to the event due to issues with her travel documents. One week later, she began the season at the 2018 Nebelhorn Trophy in Oberstdorf, Germany. She finished first in the short program and free skate, winning the gold medal with 238.43 points. Because of a change in the ISU Judging System after the 2017–18 season, the ISU reset the world record scores. Thus, Zagitova set the new world records in the short program, free skate, and combined total. At the Japan Open, she helped Team Europe finish in second place by winning the free skate by 28.90 points over Sakamoto.

In early November, Zagitova competed at her first Grand Prix event of the season, the 2018 Grand Prix of Helsinki. Despite missing the triple loop in her planned triple Lutz-triple loop combination, she finished first in the short program. Her only mistake in the free skate was under rotating her triple Lutz-triple loop combination, and she won the gold medal. Later that month, she competed at her second Grand Prix event of the season, the 2018 Rostelecom Cup. She broke her own world record in the short program with a score of 80.78 and had a 13-point lead heading into the free skate. She also won the free skate and the gold medal overall. With two gold medals, she qualified for the 2018–19 Grand Prix Final, which was expected to be a tight competition between Zagitova and Kihira. At the Grand Prix Final, Zagitova won the silver medal behind Kihira after she "popped" an attempted triple toe loop in the opening combination of her free skate.

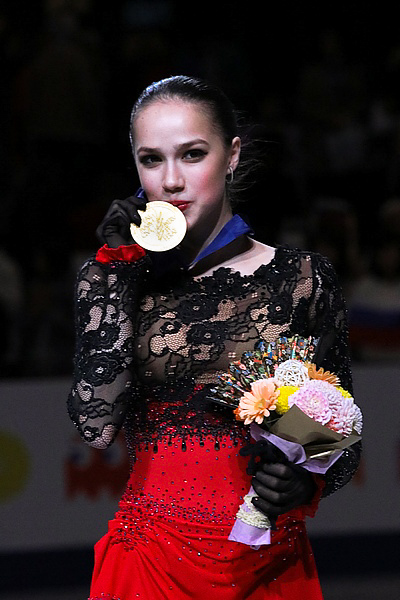
Zagitova at the 2019 World Championships medal ceremony

At the 2019 Russian Championships, Zagitova comfortably placed first in the short program. However, she did not have a successful free skate, falling twice and struggling during her choreographic sequence. She placed twelfth in the free skate, and fifth overall. She was still granted an automatic place on the Russian team for the European Championships because the top three skaters were junior competitors and were thus ineligible for the team. At the 2019 European Championships, she placed first in the short program despite an under-rotation on her triple loop. She fared poorly in the free skate, falling once and under-rotating or downgrading the majority of her jumping passes, which led to her placing fourth in the free skate, and second overall, behind teammate Sofia Samodurova.

Following the European Championships, Zagitova was chosen to represent Russia at the 2019 World Championships in Saitama, Japan, alongside Samodurova and Medvedeva. Zagitova delivered a clean skate in the short program and received a season best score of 82.08, which was more than five points ahead of Sakamoto, who placed second. Two days later, she performed a clean free program, receiving a score of 155.42, the highest of the day. With a combined score of 237.50, she was almost thirteen points clear of the rest of the field and won the World title. She became the first skater in women's singles to win the World Championships the season after winning the Olympic Games since Katarina Witt did so in 1985. Additionally, with this victory, she became the second women's singles skater after Kim to achieve a Super Slam, meaning she won all major international competitions at the junior and senior levels.

=== 2019–20 season: Hiatus ===
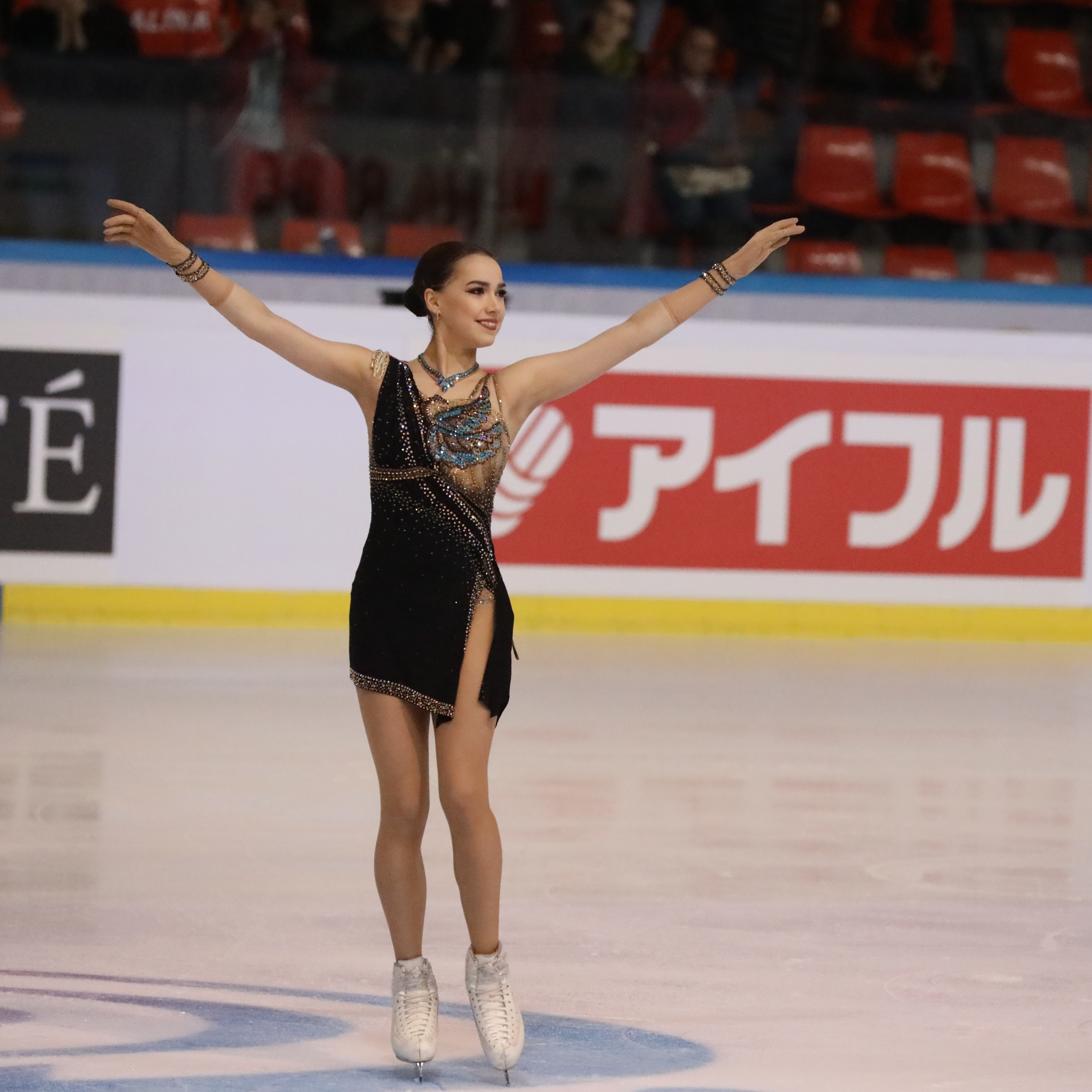
Zagitova at the 2019 Internationaux de France

Zagitova debuted two new programs: a short program to the song "Me Voy" by Yasmin Levy and a free skate inspired by Cleopatra. She began the 2019–20 season at the Japan Open, where she placed second with a score of 154.41, behind her team and training mate Alexandra Trusova, contributing to Team Europe's win.

For the 2019–20 Grand Prix season, Zagitova was assigned to the Internationaux de France and the NHK Trophy. In France, she placed second in the short program behind training mate Aliona Kostornaia after receiving an edge call on her triple Lutz and under-rotating the triple loop in combination. In the free skate, she under-rotated three jumps, placing third in that segment behind Kostornaia and Mariah Bell but won the silver medal overall. At the NHK Trophy, she placed fourth in the short program after popping the loop jump in her combination jump with a triple flip. In the free skate, she skated much better for a third-place finish overall, behind Kostornaia and Kihira and qualifying for the Grand Prix Final. There, Zagitova skated cleanly and placed second in the short program, behind Kostornaia. She was less successful in the free skate, falling on a double axel and having several other jumps deemed under rotated or downgraded, and finished sixth in that segment and overall.

Zagitova announced she was taking a break from competitive figure skating following the Grand Prix Final. She withdrew from the 2020 Russian Championships and did not contend for a spot on the 2020 European Championships or 2020 World Championships teams. In October 2020, she extended her break and announced she would not compete in the 2020–21 season. She was left off the Russian national team for the 2021–22 season. As of 2025, Zagitova has not returned to competition, but she has not formally retired.

== Skating technique ==
Zagitova is known for her endurance and ability to perform all of her jumps in the second half of her programs. This capitalized on the ISU scoring system, which awards a 10% bonus to the base value of jumps performed on "tired legs". Some observers criticized this program construction, believing it led to an unbalanced program. To address this problem, the ISU introduced a rule after the 2017–18 season—dubbed by skating enthusiasts "the Zagitova rule"—stating that a skater must perform jumps in both halves of a program, only allowing three jumping passes to receive the 10% bonus.

Zagitova is also known for her triple Lutz-triple loop combination, which was the most difficult combination in the women's field at the time of her Olympic victory. During the 2018 Olympics, The New York Times reported that Zagitova had performed the most technically difficult program in the history of women's Olympic gold medalists by performing at a base value of 46.1, approximately 25% higher than that of Kristi Yamaguchi and Tara Lipinski in the 1990s, and more than double that of Dorothy Hamill during the Olympics in the 1970s. However, by the time of her hiatus, Zagitova's technical achievements had already been surpassed by her teammates who began performing quadruple jumps and triple axels.

== Public image ==
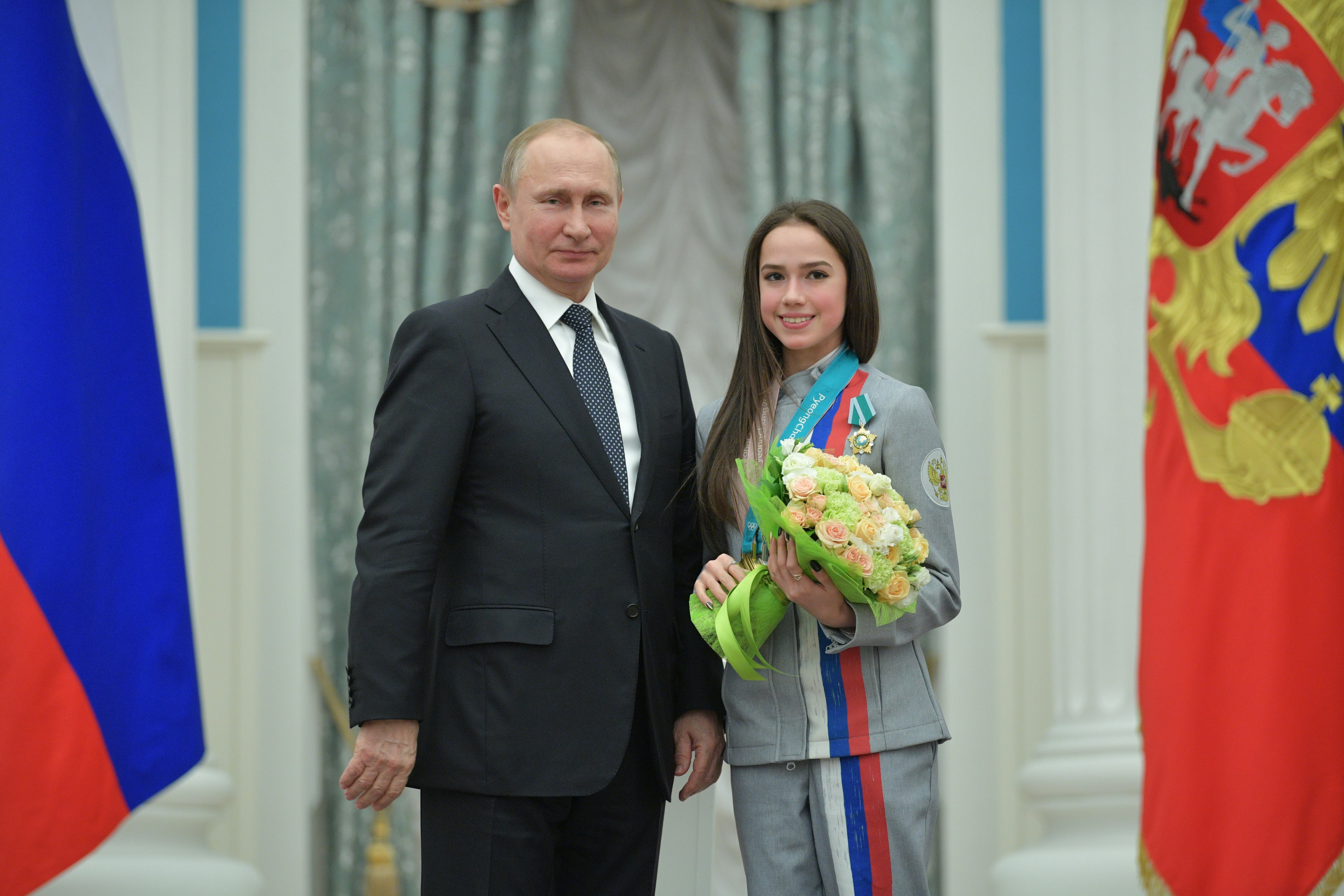
Zagitova receiving the Order of Friendship from Russian president Vladimir Putin in 2018

=== Awards ===
Zagitova was awarded the Order of Friendship for her win at the 2018 Winter Olympics. She is also a two-time winner of the Silver Doe Prize, awarded by the Federation of Sports Journalists of Russia, as one of the ten best athletes of 2017 and 2018. She was named female "Athlete of the Year" in the nomination "Pride of Russia" by the Ministry of Sport of Russia in 2018. Forbes Russia's Top 30 Under 30 list named Zagitova as the top athlete in the sports category. In 2019, she was part of Forbes Russia's 40-under-40 list of successful Russians from sports and show business. She was named "Sportswoman of the Year" at the 2019 Glamour Russia Awards and "People's Sportsman" (as determined by VTsIOM) at the 2019 Sovetsky Sport ceremony.

=== Television and magazines ===
Zagitova became a co-host of the Russian reality TV show Ice Age for its seventh season in 2020. She also co-hosted the show in 2021 and 2022. She interviewed athletes for Channel One Russia during the 2022 Russian Figure Skating Championships and was a reporter for the channel during the 2022 Winter Olympics.

Zagitova appeared on the cover of the March 2020 Russian edition of Tatler alongside teammates Shcherbakova, Trusova, and Kostornaia. In February 2023, she appeared on the cover of the Russian edition of The Voice magazine alongside Shcherbakova.

=== Endorsements ===
Zagitova has endorsed numerous brands over the years. In 2019, she became an ambassador for sports brand Puma. She has also advertised for Shiseido, Sberbank of Russia, the smartphone game Madoka Magica, and PepsiCo's brand of flavored water "Aqua Minerale Active". In April 2023, she became an ambassador and advisor on sports projects for the Russian oil company Tatneft.

=== Political views ===
After the 2018 Olympic Games, Zagitova participated in a rally supporting Vladimir Putin's 2018 presidential campaign. The co-chair of Golos, an election monitoring organization, said Zagitova's participation was a violation of election laws preventing minors from campaigning. After turning 18, she posted on Instagram in support of the 2020 Russian constitutional referendum which extended Putin's presidential term limit. She publicly supported Putin during his 2024 presidential campaign.

== Personal life and education ==
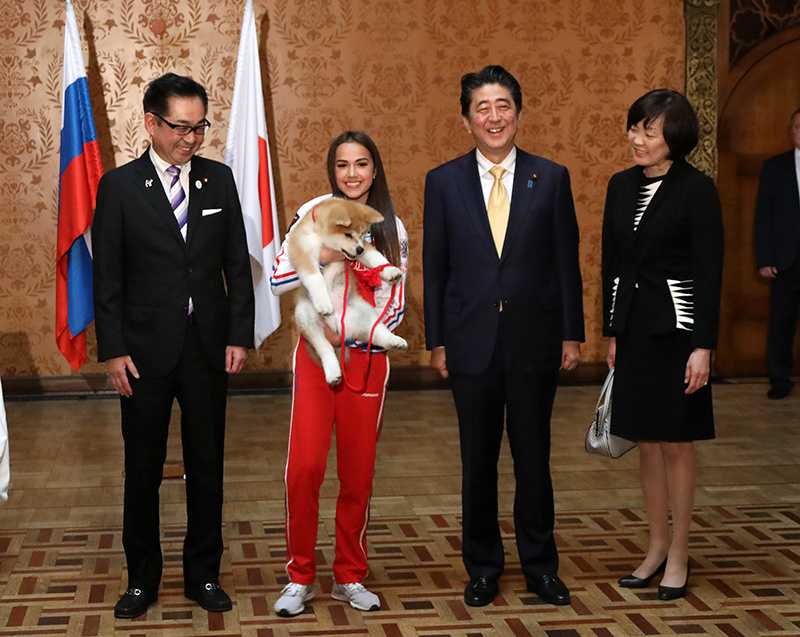
Zagitova receiving her Akita in a ceremony attended by Japanese prime minister Shinzō Abe

Zagitova owns an Akita dog named Masaru, given to her by a Japanese breeder as a gift after the 2018 Pyeongchang Olympics. She has had multiple other pets, including cats and a chinchilla. She is Muslim.

Zagitova graduated from high school in June 2020. She enrolled in the Russian Presidential Academy of National Economy and Public Administration to pursue a degree in journalism, which she received in July 2024. She decided to pursue a second degree at the Russian State University of Physical Education, Sport, Youth and Tourism.

== World records ==
Zagitova set world record scores five times at the senior level and five times at the junior level. With the change of the ISU Judging System in 2018, the International Skating Union decided to reset the highest scores and declared that all records achieved before the 2018–19 season as historical. Thus, Zagitova's short program score from the 2018 Winter Olympics is the historical world record.

- (J) indicates a junior world record score

Chronological list of world record scores in the +3/-3 GOE System
Date	Score	Segment	Event	Notes
10 Dec 2016	70.92	Short program (J)	2016–17 Junior Grand Prix Final	Zagitova became the first junior woman to score above 70 points in the short program. Alena Kostornaia broke this record at the 2017–18 Junior Grand Prix Final.
11 Dec 2016	136.51	Free skating (J)	2016–17 Junior Grand Prix Final	Zagitova beat the world record set earlier at this event by teammate Anastasiia Gubanova.
11 Dec 2016	207.43	Combined total (J)	2016–17 Junior Grand Prix Final	Zagitova became the first junior woman to score above 200 points.
19 Mar 2017	138.02	Free skating (J)	2017 World Junior Championships	This record was broken by Alexandra Trusova at the 2018 World Junior Championships.
19 Mar 2017	208.60	Combined total (J)	2017 World Junior Championships	This record was broken by Alexandra Trusova at the 2018 World Junior Championships.
21 Feb 2018	82.92	Short program	2018 Winter Olympics	Zagitova beat the world record set 15 minutes prior by teammate Evgenia Medvedeva. This is the historical world record.

Chronological list of world record scores in the +5/-5 GOE System
Date	Score	Segment	Event	Notes
27 Sep 2018	79.93	Short program	2018 CS Nebelhorn Trophy	Zagitova broke Alexandra Trusova's record from the 2018 JGP Lithuania.
28 Sep 2018	158.50	Free skating	2018 CS Nebelhorn Trophy	This record was broken by Alexandra Trusova at the 2019 CS Nepela Memorial.
28 Sep 2018	238.43	Combined total	2018 CS Nebelhorn Trophy	This record was broken by Alexandra Trusova at the 2019 CS Nepela Memorial.
17 Nov 2018	80.78	Short program	2018 Rostelecom Cup	This record was broken by Rika Kihira at the 2018–19 Grand Prix Final.

== Programs ==
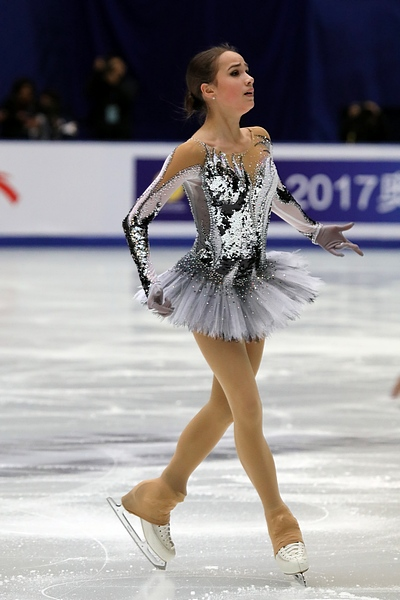
Zagitova performing her short program at the 2018 European Championships

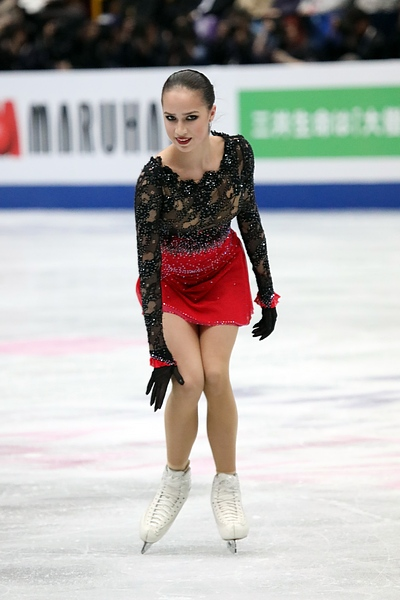
Zagitova performing her free skate at the 2019 World Championships

Competition and exhibition programs by season
Season	Short program	Free skate program	Exhibition program
2016–17	Samson and Delilah: Composed by Camille Saint-Saëns; Choreo. by Eteri Tutberidze and Daniil Gleikhengauz	Don Quixote: Composed by Ludwig Minkus; Choreo. by Eteri Tutberidze	The Pink Panther: Composed by Henry Mancini
2017–18	Black Swan: 1. Black Swan; From Black Swan; Composed by Clint Mansell; 2. "The Middle of the World"; From Moonlight; Composed by Nicholas Britell; Choreo. by Daniil Gleikhengauz	Don Quixote: Composed by Ludwig Minkus; Choreo. by Eteri Tutberidze	"Afro Blue": Composed by Mongo Santamaría; Performed by Jazzmeia Horn; Choreo. by Daniil Gleikhengauz
2018–19	The Phantom of the Opera: 1. "The Phantom of the Opera"; Composed by Andrew Lloyd Webber; 2. "Phantasia"; Based on The Phantom of the Opera; Performed by Julian Lloyd Webber; 3. "Think of Me"; Performed by Emmy Rossum and Patrick Wilson; Choreo. by Daniil Gleikhengauz	Carmen Suite: Composed by Georges Bizet; Choreo. by Daniil Gleikhengauz	"Survivor": From Tomb Raider; Performed by 2WEI
2018–19	The Phantom of the Opera: 1. "The Phantom of the Opera"; Composed by Andrew Lloyd Webber; 2. "Phantasia"; Based on The Phantom of the Opera; Performed by Julian Lloyd Webber; 3. "Think of Me"; Performed by Emmy Rossum and Patrick Wilson; Choreo. by Daniil Gleikhengauz	Carmen Suite: Composed by Georges Bizet; Choreo. by Daniil Gleikhengauz	"Bad Guy": Performed by Billie Eilish; Choreo. by Daniil Gleikhengauz
2019–20	"Me Voy": Performed by Yasmin Levy; Choreo. by Eteri Tutberidze and Daniil Gleikhengauz	Cleopatra: 1. "The Feeling Begins"; Composed by Peter Gabriel; 2. "Overture"; From Lawrence of Arabia; Composed by Maurice Jarre; 3. "Ramses"; Composed by Khatir Hicham; Choreo. by Daniil Gleikhengauz	"Outro": Performed by M83; Choreo. by Daniil Gleikhengauz
2019–20	"Me Voy": Performed by Yasmin Levy; Choreo. by Eteri Tutberidze and Daniil Gleikhengauz	Cleopatra: 1. "The Feeling Begins"; Composed by Peter Gabriel; 2. "Overture"; From Lawrence of Arabia; Composed by Maurice Jarre; 3. "Ramses"; Composed by Khatir Hicham; Choreo. by Daniil Gleikhengauz	"Bad Guy": Performed by Billie Eilish; Choreo. by Daniil Gleikhengauz
2020–21	—N/a	—N/a	"To Build a Home": Performed by The Cinematic Orchestra; Choreo. by Daniil Gleikhengauz
2020–21	—N/a	—N/a	"Esmeralda": From Notre-Dame de Paris; Composed by Riccardo Cocciante; Choreo. by Daniil Gleikhengauz
2020–21	—N/a	—N/a	"Outro": Performed by M83; Choreo. by Daniil Gleikhengauz
2021–22	—N/a	—N/a	"Can't Help Falling in Love": Performed by Diana Ankudinova
2021–22	—N/a	—N/a	"Я" (lit. 'I'): Performed by Manizha
2021–22	—N/a	—N/a	"Esmeralda": From Notre-Dame de Paris; Composed by Riccardo Cocciante; Choreo. by Daniil Gleikhengauz
2022–23	—N/a	—N/a	"Молчи и обнимай меня крепче" (lit. 'Be silent and hug me tighter'): Performed by Shura Kuznetsova
2023–24	—N/a	—N/a	"I Feel Like I'm Drowning": Performed by Two Feet
2023–24	—N/a	—N/a	"To Build a Home": Performed by The Cinematic Orchestra; Choreo. by Daniil Gleikhengauz

== Competitive highlights ==
External videos
- Alina's short program performance at the 2018 Olympic Games in PyeongChang
- Alina's free skate performance at the 2018 Olympic Games in PyeongChang

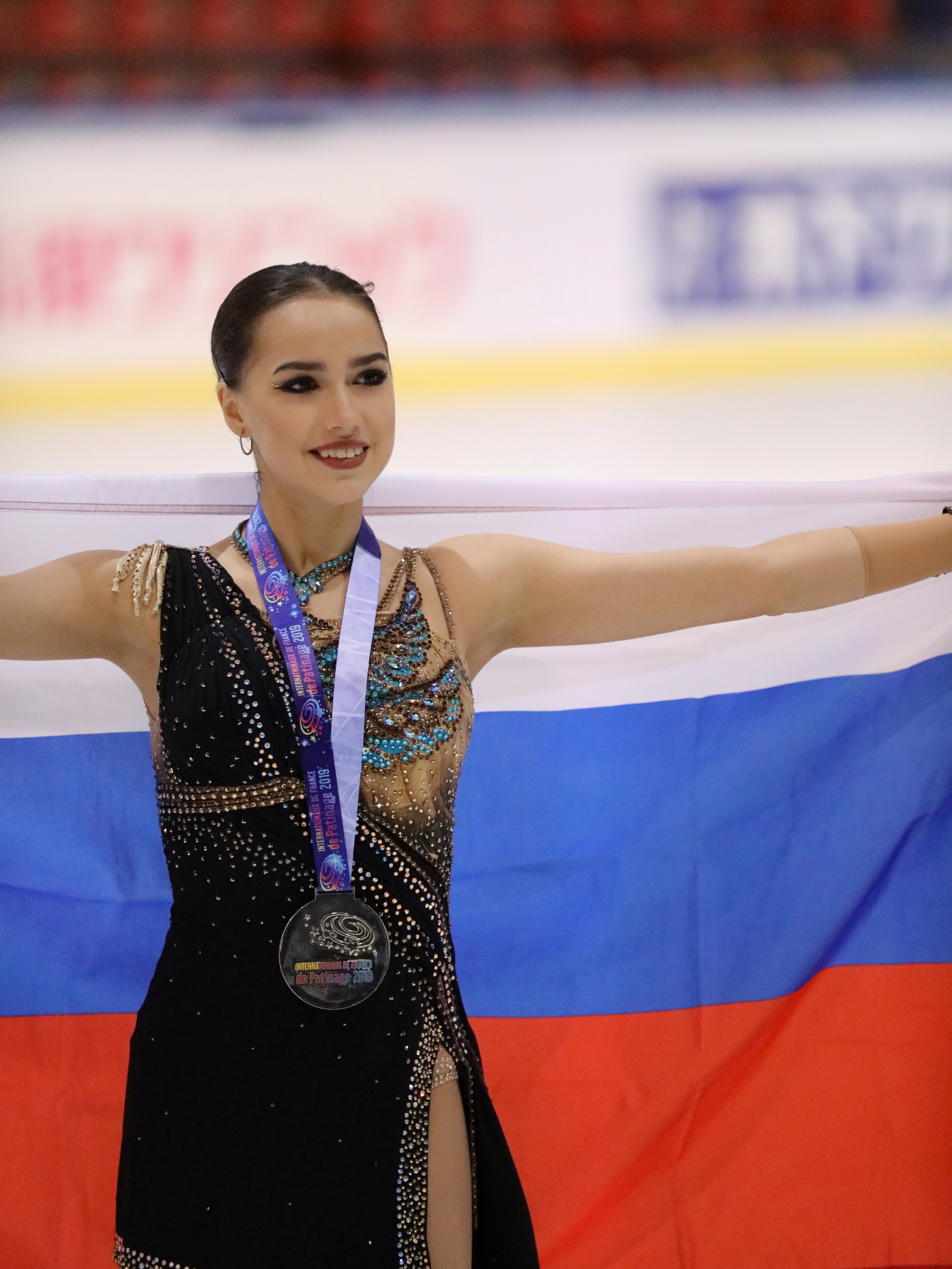
Zagitova at the 2019 Internationaux de France

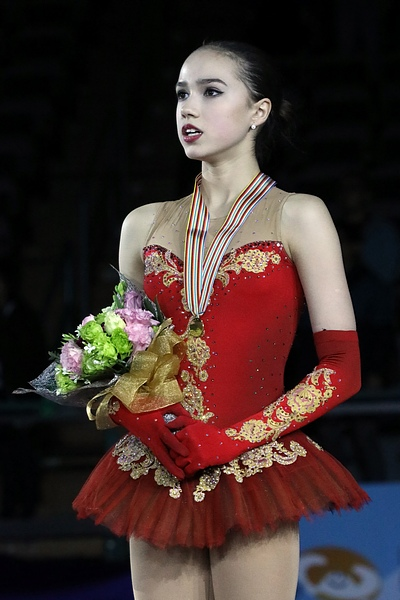
Zagitova on the 2017 World Junior Championships podium

- GP – Event of the ISU Grand Prix Series
- JGP – Event of the ISU Junior Grand Prix Series
- CS – Event of the ISU Challenger Series
- Medals at team events are awarded for the team results only. Individual placements at team events are listed in parentheses.

Competition placements at senior level
Season	2016–17	2017–18	2018–19	2019–20
Winter Olympics		1st		
Winter Olympics (Team event)		2nd		
World Championships		5th	1st	
European Championships		1st	2nd	
Grand Prix Final		1st	2nd	6th
Russian Championships	2nd	1st	5th	WD
GP Cup of China		1st		
GP Finland			1st	
GP France		1st		2nd
GP NHK Trophy				3rd
GP Rostelecom Cup			1st	
CS Lombardia Trophy		1st		
CS Nebelhorn Trophy			1st	
Japan Open		1st (3rd)	2nd (1st)	1st (2nd)

Competition placements at junior level
Season	2015–16	2016–17
World Junior Championships		1st
Junior Grand Prix Final		1st
Russian Junior Championships	9th	1st
JGP France		1st
JGP Slovenia		3rd
European Youth Olympic Festival		1st
Russian Cup Final	4th	

== Detailed results ==
- TSS – Total segment score
- TES – Technical element score
- PCS – Program component score

ISU personal best scores in the +5/-5 GOE System
Segment	Type	Score	Event
Total	TSS	238.43	2018 CS Nebelhorn Trophy
Short program	TSS	82.08	2019 World Championships
Short program	TES	44.72	2019 World Championships
Short program	PCS	37.36	2019 World Championships
Free skating	TSS	158.50	2018 CS Nebelhorn Trophy
Free skating	TES	83.54	2018 CS Nebelhorn Trophy
Free skating	PCS	74.96	2018 CS Nebelhorn Trophy

ISU personal best scores in the +3/-3 GOE System
Segment	Type	Score	Event
Total	TSS	239.57	2018 Winter Olympics
Short program	TSS	82.92	2018 Winter Olympics
Short program	TES	45.30	2018 Winter Olympics
Short program	PCS	37.62	2018 Winter Olympics
Free skating	TSS	157.97	2018 European Championships
Free skating	TES	82.67	2018 European Championships
Free skating	PCS	75.30	2018 European Championships

- Small medals for the short program and free skating are only awarded at ISU Championships.
- Medals at team events are awarded for the team results only. Individual placements at team events are listed in parentheses.

=== Senior level ===
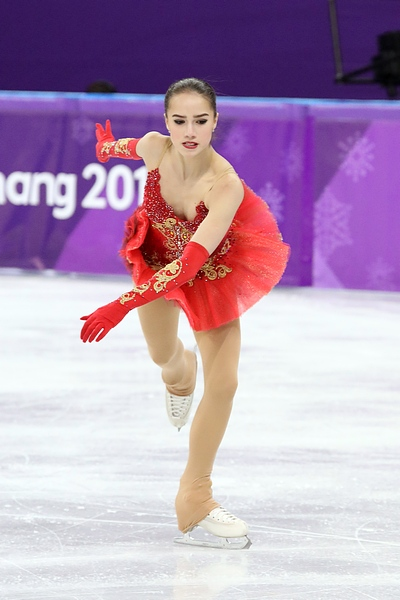
Zagitova performing her free skate at the 2018 Winter Olympics

Results in the 2016–17 season
Date	Event	SP		FS		Total		Details
Date	Event	P	Score	P	Score	P	Score	Details
20–26 Dec 2016	(Russia) 2017 Russian Championships	3	74.26	2	146.95	2	221.21	Details

Results in the 2017–18 season
Date	Event	SP		FS		Total		Details
Date	Event	P	Score	P	Score	P	Score	Details
14–17 Sep 2017	(Italy) 2017 CS Lombardia Trophy	3	71.29	1	147.17	1	218.46	Details
7 Oct 2017	2017 Japan Open	—N/a	—N/a	3	145.28	1 (3)	—N/a	Details
3–5 Nov 2017	2017 Cup of China	4	69.44	1	144.44	1	213.88	Details
17–19 Nov 2017	2017 Internationaux de France	5	62.46	1	151.34	1	213.80	Details
7–10 Dec 2017	(Japan) 2017–18 Grand Prix Final	2	76.27	1	147.03	1	223.30	Details
21–24 Dec 2017	(Russia) 2018 Russian Championships	1	78.15	1	155.44	1	233.59	Details
15–21 Jan 2018	(Russia) 2018 European Championships	1	80.27	1	157.97	1	238.24	Details
9–12 Feb 2018	(South Korea) 2018 Winter Olympics (Team event)	—N/a	—N/a	1	158.08	2	—N/a	Details
21–23 Feb 2018	(South Korea) 2018 Winter Olympics	1	82.92	2	156.65	1	239.57	Details
19–25 Mar 2018	(Italy) 2018 World Championships	2	79.51	7	128.21	5	207.72	Details

Results in the 2018–19 season
Date	Event	SP		FS		Total		Details
Date	Event	P	Score	P	Score	P	Score	Details
26–29 Sep 2018	(Germany) 2018 CS Nebelhorn Trophy	1	79.93	1	158.50	1	238.43	Details
6 Oct 2018	2018 Japan Open	—N/a	—N/a	1	159.18	2 (1)	—N/a	Details
2–4 Nov 2018	(Finland) 2018 Grand Prix of Helsinki	1	68.90	1	146.39	1	215.29	Details
16–18 Nov 2018	(Russia) 2018 Rostelecom Cup	1	80.78	1	142.17	1	222.95	Details
6–9 Dec 2018	(Canada) 2018–19 Grand Prix Final	2	77.93	2	148.60	2	226.53	Details
19–23 Dec 2018	(Russia) 2019 Russian Championships	1	80.62	12	131.41	5	212.03	Details
21–27 Jan 2019	(Belarus) 2019 European Championships	1	75.00	4	123.34	2	198.34	Details
18–24 Mar 2019	(Japan) 2019 World Championships	1	82.08	1	155.42	1	237.50	Details

Results in the 2019–20 season
Date	Event	SP		FS		Total		Details
Date	Event	P	Score	P	Score	P	Score	Details
5 Oct 2019	2019 Japan Open	—N/a	—N/a	2	154.41	1 (2)	—N/a	Details
1–3 Nov 2019	2019 Internationaux de France	2	74.24	3	141.82	2	216.06	Details
22–24 Nov 2019	(Japan) 2019 NHK Trophy	4	66.84	3	151.15	3	217.99	Details
5–8 Dec 2019	(Italy) 2019–20 Grand Prix Final	2	79.60	6	125.63	6	205.23	Details

=== Junior level ===
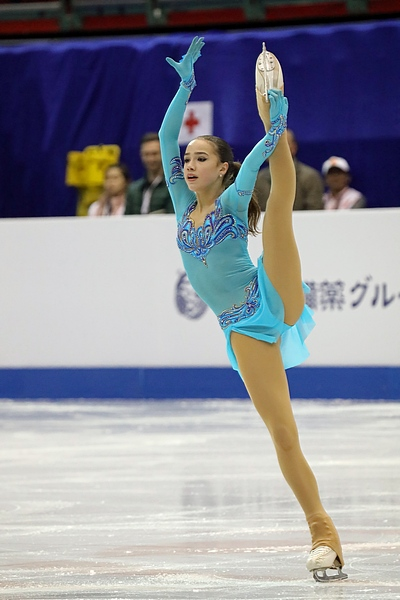
Zagitova at the 2017 World Junior Championships

Results in the 2015–16 season
Date	Event	SP		FS		Total		Details
Date	Event	P	Score	P	Score	P	Score	Details
19–23 Jan 2016	(Russia) 2016 Russian Junior Championships	12	52.85	8	108.08	9	160.93	Details
16–20 Feb 2016	(Russia) 2016 Russian Cup Final (Junior)	6	57.55	1	121.04	4	178.59	Details

Results in the 2016–17 season
Date	Event	SP		FS		Total		Details
Date	Event	P	Score	P	Score	P	Score	Details
24–27 Aug 2016	2016 JGP France	1	68.07	1	126.30	1	194.37	Details
22–24 Sep 2016	2016 JGP Slovenia	1	68.09	4	109.29	3	177.38	Details
8–11 Dec 2016	(France) 2016–17 Junior Grand Prix Final	1	70.92	1	136.51	1	207.43	Details
1–5 Feb 2017	(Russia) 2017 Russian Championships (Junior)	1	74.46	1	142.36	1	216.82	Details
13–15 Feb 2017	(Turkey) 2017 European Youth Olympic Festival	1	58.30	1	128.76	1	187.06	Details
15–19 Mar 2017	(Taiwan) 2017 World Junior Championships	1	70.58	1	138.02	1	208.60	Details
