= Aleksandra Golovkina-Dolinskė =

Lithuanian figure skater (born 1998)

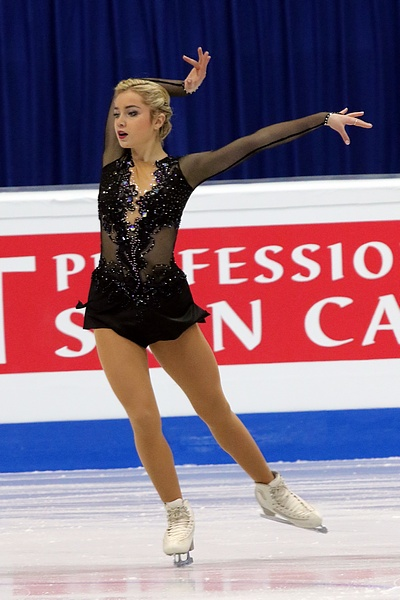
- Aleksandra Golovkina-Dolinskė at the 2016 European Championships

Personal information
- Other names: Aleksandra Golovkina
- Born: 1 July 1998 (age 28) Vilnius, Lithuania
- Home town: Dundee, Scotland, United Kingdom
- Height: 1.63 m (5 ft 4 in)

Figure skating career
- Country: United Kingdom (since 2026); Lithuania (until 2026)
- Discipline: Women's singles
- Coach: David Richardson; Simon Briggs; Debi Briggs
- Skating club: Startas, Kaunas
- Began skating: 2004

Medal record
Lithuanian Championships
| Gold medal – first place | 2012 Kaunas | Singles |
| Gold medal – first place | 2013 Kaunas | Singles |
| Gold medal – first place | 2016 Kaunas | Singles |
| Gold medal – first place | 2020 Kaunas | Singles |
| Gold medal – first place | 2022 Kaunas | Singles |
| Gold medal – first place | 2023 Kaunas | Singles |
| Silver medal – second place | 2014 Kaunas | Singles |
| Silver medal – second place | 2024 Kaunas | Singles |

Aleksandra Golovkina-Dolinskė, (née Golovkina; born 1 July 1998) is a Lithuanian figure skater who represents Great Britain. She is the gold medalist of the Tayside Trophy 2023 and a six-time Lithuanian national champion (2012, 2013, 2016, 2019, 2022, and 2023). She has competed in five European Championships and two World Championships.

== Personal life ==
Golovkina-Dolinskė was born on 1 July 1998 in Vilnius, Lithuania.

She married in May 2024 and hyphenated her surname with the feminine form of her husband's last name. The couple reside in Dundee, Scotland, United Kingdom.

== Career ==
=== Early years ===
Golovkina-Dolinskė began figure skating in 2004. She competed internationally on the novice level from the 2008–09 season to the 2011–12 season.

=== Skating for Lithuania ===
==== 2012–13 season ====
Golovkina-Dolinskė's ISU Junior Grand Prix (JGP) debut came in August 2012. In March 2013, she competed at the 2013 World Junior Championships in Milan but did not advance to the free skating segment after placing 39th in the short program.

==== 2013–14 season ====
Golovkina-Dolinskė began the 2013–14 season on the JGP series, placing 16th in Estonia. In November 2013, she won the junior bronze medal at the NRW Trophy before making her senior international debut at the Warsaw Cup; she placed 9th in the short program, 1st in the free skate, and 4th overall in Warsaw. Continuing on the senior level, she finished 4th at the 2014 Toruń Cup and 5th at the Hellmut Seibt Memorial.

==== 2014–15 season ====
Golovkina-Dolinskė competed at one JGP event and then won her first senior international medal, silver, at the Ice Star in Minsk, Belarus. In November 2014, she began competing on the ISU Challenger Series (CS), placing 5th at the Volvo Open Cup before taking bronze at the Warsaw Cup. She placed 7th at her final CS event, the 2014 Golden Spin of Zagreb. Golovkina-Dolinskė was named to Lithuania's team to the 2015 European Championships in Stockholm, Sweden. Ranked 23rd in the short program, she qualified for the free skate, where she placed 17th, lifting her to 19th overall.

==== 2015–16 season ====
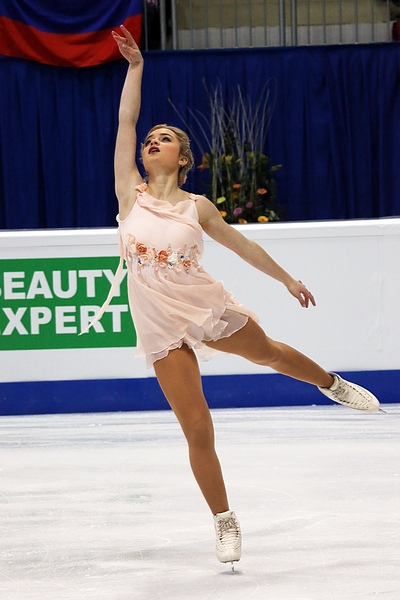
Golovkina-Dolinskė at the 2016 European Championships

Golovkina-Dolinskė won her second Lithuanian Championship title and secured her second consecutive silver medal at the Ice Star competition in Minsk, Belarus. Subsequently, she represented Lithuania at the European Championships, finishing in the 16th position. Dolinskė also participated in the World Championships, landing in 33rd place.

==== 2016–17 season ====
She competed in four distinct events, with her most notable achievement being a 9th-place finish in Nice.

==== 2017–18 season ====
Golovkina-Dolinskė sustained an injury that required leg tendon surgery, preventing her from participating in most competitions that year. However, she attempted to qualify for the Olympics at the Nebelhorn Trophy competition in Oberstdorf, Germany, towards the end of the season. She placed 19th and did not qualify for the Olympics.

==== 2018–19 season: Initial retirement ====
During the 2018–19 season, Golovkina-Dolinskė decided to conclude her ice skating career. She relocated to Newcastle Upon Tyne, United Kingdom, where she commenced her studies in sports, Exercise, and Nutrition. That same year, she resumed skating at the Whitley Bay ice rink and began training under the guidance of her coach, David Richardson.

==== 2019–20 season: Return to competition ====
Golovkina-Dolinskė made a comeback to the sport after an absence of a year and a half. She began her season with a 3rd-place finish in the Tayside Trophy and a 7th-place finish in the Torun Cup. Additionally, she competed in the European Championship, finishing in 26th place. Dolinskė won her third Lithuanian Championship title.

==== 2020–21 season ====
The 2020–21 season was cancelled due to the COVID-19 pandemic. In the same year, Aleksandra decided to relocate to Dundee, Scotland, and train there.

==== 2021–22 season ====
At the start of the 2021–22 season, Golovkina-Dolinskė again competed at the Tayside Trophy competition in Dundee, Scotland, where she finished in 4th place. Later in the season, she competed in the European Championship in Tallinn, Estonia and advanced to the free program. She finished in overall 21st place. Golovkina-Dolinskė also won her fourth Lithuanian Championship title.

==== 2022–23 season ====
At the 2022 Warsaw Cup, Golovkina-Dolinskė achieved a new personal best of 157.42 points, as well as a new personal best in the short program of 55.49. She also set a new personal best in the free skate at the 2022 Ondrej Nepela Memorial, where she received a score of 103.41. Golovkina-Dolinskė concluded the year with a 3rd-place finish in the Crystal Skate competition in Bucharest, Romania, and a 5th-place finish in the Tayside Trophy competition in Dundee. She also secured her fifth Lithuanian Championship title. A hamstring injury forced her to withdraw from two of the season's most significant competitions, the European Championships and the Universiade in Lake Placid, United States.

==== 2023–24 season ====
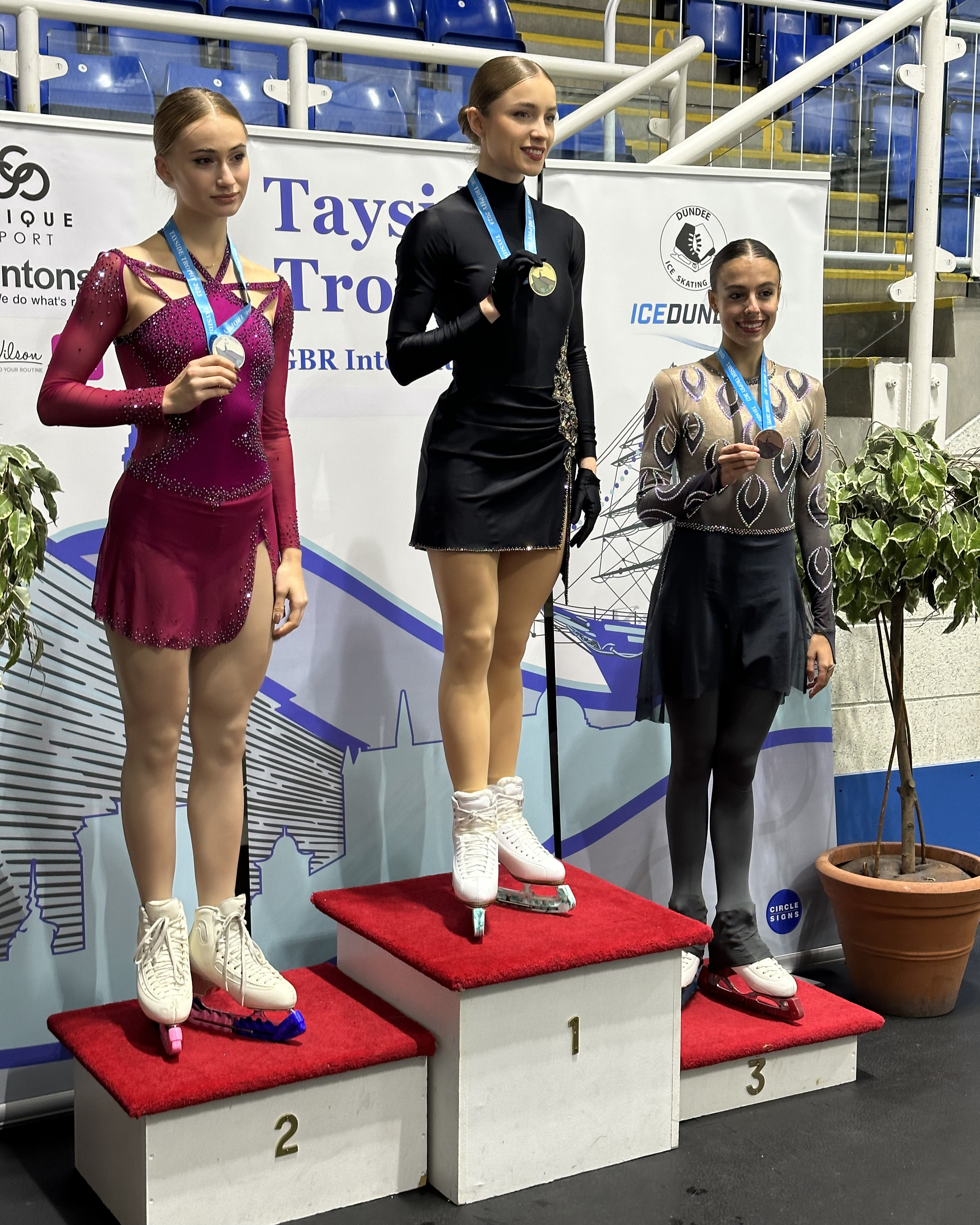
Aleksandra Dolinskė takes 1st place at the Tayside Trophy 2023

Golovkina-Dolinskė began her season by participating in the 2023 Nepela Memorial, where she finished in eleventh place. A few weeks later, she won the Tayside Trophy with a score of 151.23. Later in the same month, she placed second at the Swiss Ice Skating Open 2023.

At the Warsaw Cup 2023 in Poland, Golovkina-Dolinskė set a new overall personal best of 158.67, as well as a new personal best in the free skate. In early December, she competed at the Edusport Trophy, scoring a total of 158.50 points and winning the bronze medal. In the same month, just before Christmas, Golovkina-Dolinskė competed in the Lithuanian Figure Skating Championship, finishing in second place behind Meda Variakojyte. However, as Golovkina-Dolinskė had the better overall results, she was still chosen to represent Lithuania at the 2024 European Figure Skating Championships. This was the first time in her senior career that she did not win a gold medal at the national championships.

At the beginning of 2024, Golovkina-Dolinskė took part in the European Figure Skating Championships, which were held in her home country, Lithuania, in the city of Kaunas. Despite a leg injury limiting her on-ice training time and a fall on her second jump, she qualified for the free program in fourteenth place and set a new personal best for the short program. In the free program, she finished sixteenth and was also sixteenth overall in the competition.

==== 2024–25 season ====
Golovkina-Dolinskė sustained a knee injury at the beginning of the season; it took several weeks to receive the correct diagnosis of a dislocated kneecap. She did not compete until late November at the 2024 CS Warsaw Cup, where she finished in eighteenth place. However, she said she was happy simply to return to skating at all, as after her injury, she was not sure if she would be able to do so. She then went on to place sixth at the 2024 EduSport Trophy the following month.

Golovkina-Dolinskė opted to skip the rest of the season to focus on recovering from her injury. Due to prolonged rehabilitation, a good portion of her funding was cut. In February, she started a GoFundMe account to help pay for future training.

==== 2025–26 season: Final season for Lithuania ====
Golovkina-Dolinskė was one of three Lithuanian woman competing for the Lithuanian Olympic quota won by Meda Variakojytė; the Lithuanian federation announced the decision would be based on their results on the ISU Challenger Series as well as at the Lithuanian Championships in December. She said that she was happy to have the opportunity to compete for the spot, saying, "4 years ago, I really thought that it was impossible for me to be at the Olympics," but that she also had other goals she wanted to achieve during the season.

At the Lithuanian Championships, Golovkina-Dolinskė competed in the short program and gave a performance she expressed satisfaction with. However, before the free program, she withdrew after skating several laps in the warm-up period. She called this the "most difficult decision in my entire career" but one that was necessary for her mental health, saying, "The last two seasons were extremely difficult for me from different sides. And today it was very important for me to listen to myself and simply not to cross the boundaries that would harm me." The Olympic spot was ultimately awarded to Variakojytė.

In April 2026, Golovkina-Dolinskė announced that she would begin representing Great Britain following a dispute with the Lithuanian Skating Federation. She alleged that the Federation was unhappy with her seeking funding through GoFundMe and considered it disrespectful, and that she felt that the Federation wanted her to end her career.

=== Skating for Great Britain ===
==== 2026–27 season ====
In August, Golovkina-Dolinskė was officially cleared by the International Skating Union to represent Great Britain internationally from 7 December 2026.

== Programs ==
| Season | Short program | Free skating | Exhibition |
|---|---|---|---|
| 2008–09 | | Hoşgeldin by Nida Öz | |
| 2009–10 | | Appassionata by Secret Garden | |
| 2011–12 | | | Raudoni Vakarai by Ieva Narkutė |
| 2012–13 | The Artist by Ludovic Bource choreo. by Dmitrij Kozlov; Clair de lune (from Suite bergamasque) by Claude Debussy choreo. by Dmitrij Kozlov | Memoirs of a Geisha by John Williams choreo. by Elena Maslennikova | |
| 2014–15 | El Tango de Roxanne (from Moulin Rouge!) choreo. by Rasa Birbalienė | Piano Concerto No. 2 by Sergei Rachmaninoff choreo. by Rasa Birbalienė | Hurt by Christina Aguilera; El Tango de Roxanne |
| 2015–16 | Feeling Good by Michael Bublé choreo. by Elena Maslennikova | Adagio from Concerto No. 23 by Wolfgang Amadeus Mozart; Romeo and Juliet by Abel Korzeniowski choreo. by Elena Maslennikova | |
| 2016–17 | Feeling Good by Michael Bublé choreo. by Elena Maslennikova | Adagio from Concerto No. 23 by Wolfgang Amadeus Mozart; Romeo and Juliet by Abel Korzeniowski choreo. by Elena Maslennikova | |
| 2017–18 | Frida by Elliot Goldenthal choreo. by Benoit Richaud | Adagio from Concerto No. 23 by Wolfgang Amadeus Mozart; Romeo and Juliet by Abel Korzeniowski choreo. by Elena Maslennikova | |
| 2019–20 | Seven Nation Army by Scott Bradlee's Postmodern Jukebox choreo. by David Richardson | Tango Selection choreo. by David Richardson | |
| 2021–22 | Rise Like A Phoenix by Rossella Longo choreo. by David Richardson | Stand By Me by Ben E. King performed by Florence and the Machine choreo. by David Richardson | |
| 2022–23 | Rise Like A Phoenix by Rossella Longo choreo. by David Richardson | My Reason (from Modigliani) performed by Guy Farley choreo. by David Richardson | |
| 2023–24 | Bloodstream by Ed Sheeran performed by Tokio Myers choreo. by David Richardson | My Reason (from Modigliani) performed by Guy Farley choreo. by David Richardson | Vinegar & Salt by Hooverphonic |
| 2024–25 | Bloodstream by Ed Sheeran performed by Tokio Myers choreo. by David Richardson | Indemnity by Steve Horner; Bella Ciao by Tadej Meglic choreo. by Viktorija Seinker, Mathieu Geffre | |
| 2025–26 | It's a Man's Man's Man's World by James Brown & Betty Jean Newsome performed by Seal choreo. by David Richardson, Aleksandra Dolinskė | Tennessee (from Pearl Harbor) by Hans Zimmer; Heart of Courage by Two Steps from Hell choreo. by David Richardson, Aleksandra Dolinskė | |
| 2026–27 | Caruso by Jackie Evancho choreo. by Mark Hanretty | The Matrix; Clubbed to Death by Rob Dougan choreo. by Jennifer Morgan-Milne | |

== Competitive highlights ==
- JGP – Event of the ISU Junior Grand Prix Series
- CS – Event of the ISU Challenger Series
- TBD – Assigned
- WD – Withdrew from competition

=== Skating for Lithuania ===
Competition placements at senior level
| Season | 2011–12 | 2012–13 | 2013–14 | 2014–15 | 2015–16 | 2016–17 | 2017–18 | 2019–20 | 2021–22 | 2022–23 | 2023–24 | 2024–25 | 2025–26 |
|---|---|---|---|---|---|---|---|---|---|---|---|---|---|
| World Championships | | | | 28th | 33rd | | | | | | | | |
| European Championships | | | | 19th | 16th | | | 26th | 21st | | 16th | | |
| Lithuanian Championships | 1st | 1st | 2nd | | 1st | | | 1st | 1st | 1st | 2nd | | WD |
| CS Golden Spin of Zagreb | | | | 7th | | | | | | | | | 18th |
| CS Ice Star | | | | 2nd | 2nd | | | 9th | | | | | |
| CS Lombardia Trophy | | | | | | 21st | 29th | | | | | | |
| CS Mordovian Ornament | | | | | 5th | | | | | | | | |
| CS Nebelhorn Trophy | | | | | | | 19th | | 28th | | | | |
| CS Nepela Memorial | | | | | | 13th | | 13th | | 4th | 11th | | 13th |
| CS Tallinn Trophy | | | | | 13th | | | 13th | | | | | |
| CS Volvo Open Cup | | | | 5th | | 10th | | | | | | | |
| CS Warsaw Cup | | | 4th | 3rd | 7th | | | | 20th | 7th | 7th | 18th | 12th |
| Bellu Memorial | | | | | | | | | | | 4th | | |
| Challenge Cup | | | | | | | | | 14th | | | | |
| Crystal Skate of Romania | | | | | | | | | | 3rd | | | |
| Cup of Nice | | | | | | 9th | | | | | | | |
| EduSport Trophy | | | | | | | | | | | 3rd | 6th | |
| Ephesus Cup | | | | | | | | | | | 1st | | |
| Hellmut Seibt Memorial | | | 5th | 13th | | | | | | | | | |
| Lõunakeskus Trophy | | | | | | | | | | | 2nd | | |
| Mentor Cup | | | 4th | | 9th | | | 7th | | | | | |
| Robin Cousins Cup | | | | | | | | | | | | | 5th |
| Swiss Open | | | | | | | | | | | 2nd | | |
| Tayside Trophy | | | | | | | | 3rd | 4th | 5th | 1st | | 8th |

== Detailed results ==
ISU personal best scores in the +5/-5 GOE System
| Segment | Type | Score | Event |
|---|---|---|---|
| Total | TSS | 158.67 | 2023 CS Warsaw Cup |
| Short program | TSS | 55.80 | 2024 European Championships |
| Short program | TES | 29.30 | 2024 European Championships |
| Short program | PCS | 27.50 | 2024 European Championships |
| Free skating | TSS | 105.56 | 2023 CS Warsaw Cup |
| Free skating | TES | 51.81 | 2022 CS Nepela Memorial |
| Free skating | PCS | 55.00 | 2023 CS Warsaw Cup |

=== Senior level ===
Results in the 2025-26 season
| Date | Event | SP | | FS | | Total | |
| Date | Event | P | Score | P | Score | P | Score |
|---|---|---|---|---|---|---|---|
| 21–22 Aug 2025 | (United Kingdom) 2025 Robin Cousins Cup | 4 | 46.92 | 7 | 78.37 | 5 | 125.29 |
| 25–27 Sep 2025 | (Slovakia) 2025 CS Nepela Memorial | 18 | 48.43 | 12 | 95.81 | 13 | 144.24 |
| 11–12 Oct 2025 | (United Kingdom) 2025 Tayside Trophy | 1! | 44.46 | 8 | 85.52 | 8 | 129.98 |
| 19–23 Nov 2025 | (Poland) 2025 CS Warsaw Cup | 9 | 51.42 | 13 | 90.07 | 12 | 141.49 |
| 3–6 Dec 2025 | (Croatia) 2025 CS Golden Spin of Zagreb | 20 | 48.31 | 18 | 89.66 | 18 | 137.97 |
| 13–14 Dec 2025 | (Lithuania) 2026 Lithuanian Championships | 3 | 51.36 | —N/a | —N/a | WD | —N/a |
