= Figure skating at the 2017 European Youth Olympic Winter Festival =

- Date: February 13 – 15
- Season: 2016–17
- Location: Erzurum, Turkey

Champions
- Men's singles: (Russia) Petr Gumennik
- Ladies' singles: (Russia) Alina Zagitova
- Previous: 2015 European Youth Olympic Winter Festival
- Next: 2019 European Youth Olympic Winter Festival

Figure skating competition at the 2017 European Youth Olympic Winter Festival was held in Erzurum, Turkey from February 13 to 15, 2017. Medals were awarded in men's and ladies' singles. Eligible skaters must have been born between July 1, 2000 and June 30, 2002.

== Medal summary ==
=== Medalists ===
Event	Gold	Silver	Bronze
Men	(Russia) Petr Gumennik	(Italy) Daniel Grassl	(Georgia (country)) Nika Egadze
Ladies	(Russia) Alina Zagitova	(Ukraine) Anastasia Hozhva	(Italy) Lucrezia Gennaro

=== Medal table ===
Rank	Nation	Gold	Silver	Bronze	Total
1	Russia (RUS)	2	0	0	2
2	Italy (ITA)	0	1	1	2
3	Ukraine (UKR)	0	1	0	1
4	Georgia (GEO)	0	0	1	1
Totals (4 entries)		2	2	2	6

== Entries ==
Entries were published on 10 February 2017.

Country	Men	Ladies
Belarus	Yakau Zenko	Hanna Paroshyna
Bulgaria	Aleksandar Zlatkov	Presiyana Dimitrova
Croatia		Katarina Kitarović
Cyprus		Daniella Vanessa Ipsaridou
Denmark		Josephine Kaersgaard
Estonia	Aleksandr Selevko	Kristina Škuleta-Gromova
Finland		Laura Karhunen
France	Adam Siao Him Fa	Alizée Crozet
Georgia	Nika Egadze	
Greece		Elisavet Voulgari
Iceland		Herdis Birna Hjaltalin
Italy	Daniel Grassl	Lucrezia Gennaro
Lithuania		Valerija Keda
Moldova		Anna Ivancenco
Netherlands		Sam Jansen
Poland	Kornel Witkowski	
Romania	Andrei Tanase	Amanda Stan
Russia	Petr Gumennik	Alina Zagitova
Slovakia	Simon Fukas	Silvia Hugec
Slovenia		Lara Guček
Sweden	Nikolaj Majorov	
Turkey	Başar Oktar	Ekin Saygı
Ukraine	Yan Tkalych	Anastasia Hozhva
United Kingdom	Luke Digby	Anna Litvinenko

== Results ==
=== Men ===
Rank	Name	Nation	Total points	SP		FS	
1	Petr Gumennik	Russia	195.21	1	67.56	1	127.65
2	Daniel Grassl	Italy	178.24	2	63.35	2	114.89
3	Nika Egadze	Georgia	155.18	6	53.71	4	101.47
4	Başar Oktar	Turkey	154.11	3	62.20	7	91.91
5	Yakau Zenko	Belarus	152.43	5	54.08	5	98.35
6	Aleksandr Selevko	Estonia	148.73	4	55.03	6	93.70
7	Adam Siao Him Fa	France	146.39	9	44.19	3	102.20
8	Luke Digby	United Kingdom	140.80	7	49.32	8	91.48
9	Yan Tkalych	Ukraine	136.14	8	47.97	9	88.17
10	Nikolaj Majorov	Sweden	124.97	10	43.95	10	81.02
11	Simon Fukas	Slovakia	123.35	12	42.84	11	80.51
12	Aleksandar Zlatkov	Bulgaria	117.85	11	43.89	12	73.96
13	Kornel Witkowski	Poland	98.31	13	41.16	13	57.15
14	Andrei Tanase	Romania	69.95	14	26.01	14	43.94

=== Ladies ===
Rank	Name	Nation	Total points	SP		FS	
1	Alina Zagitova	Russia	187.06	1	58.30	1	128.76
2	Anastasia Hozhva	Ukraine	127.18	2	49.78	7	77.40
3	Lucrezia Gennaro	Italy	125.53	4	43.67	3	81.86
4	Alizée Crozet	France	125.34	8	40.33	2	85.01
5	Kristina Škuleta-Gromova	Estonia	123.81	3	44.05	5	79.76
6	Hanna Paroshyna	Belarus	122.35	6	42.49	4	79.86
7	Anna Litvinenko	United Kingdom	117.65	9	39.01	6	78.64
8	Silvia Hugec	Slovakia	117.47	5	42.57	8	74.90
9	Amanda Stan	Romania	116.48	7	41.93	9	74.55
10	Laura Karhunen	Finland	103.50	13	34.26	10	69.24
11	Presiyana Dimitrova	Bulgaria	97.86	12	35.66	11	62.20
12	Anna Ivancenco	Moldova	95.00	14	33.38	12	61.62
13	Katarina Kitarović	Croatia	94.45	11	36.58	15	57.87
14	Valerija Keda	Lithuania	91.61	15	31.72	14	59.89
15	Lara Guček	Slovenia	91.46	17	30.32	13	61.14
16	Sam Jansen	Netherlands	87.61	10	37.89	19	49.72
17	Ekin Saygı	Turkey	83.68	16	30.61	16	53.07
18	Josephine Kaersgaard	Denmark	81.50	18	29.82	17	51.68
19	Herdis Birna Hjaltalin	Iceland	77.95	19	27.89	18	50.06
20	Elisavet Voulgari	Greece	71.39	20	24.66	20	46.73
21	Daniella Vanessa Ipsaridou	Cyprus	55.01	21	20.71	21	34.30
