= Lucrezia Gennaro =

Italian figure skater

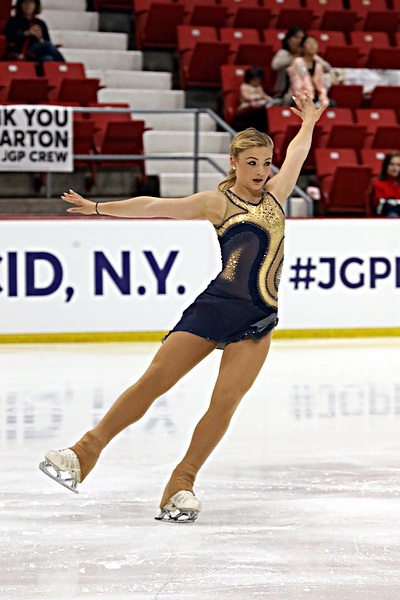
- Gennaro at the 2019 JGP Lake Placid

Personal information
- Born: 25 July 2001 (age 25) Treviso, Italy
- Height: 1.62 m (5 ft 4 in)

Figure skating career
- Country: Greece (since 2024); Italy (2013–21)
- Coach: Ludmila Mladenova
- Skating club: Ice Skate Academy Padova
- Began skating: 2004

Lucrezia Gennaro (born 25 July 2001) is an Italian figure skater who currently competes for Greece.

Representing Italy, she is the 2018 Triglav Trophy champion, the 2018 EduSport Trophy champion, the 2018 Denkova-Staviski Cup silver medalist, the 2019 Sofia Trophy silver medalist, and the 2019 Open Ice Mall Cup silver medalist. She has competed in the final segment at two ISU Championships – the 2016 World Junior Championships and 2019 European Championships.

== Career ==
=== Skating for Italy ===
==== Early career ====
Gennaro began learning to skate in 2004. She competed in the advanced novice ranks during the 2013–2014 and 2014–2015 seasons. In February 2015, she became the Italian national junior champion.

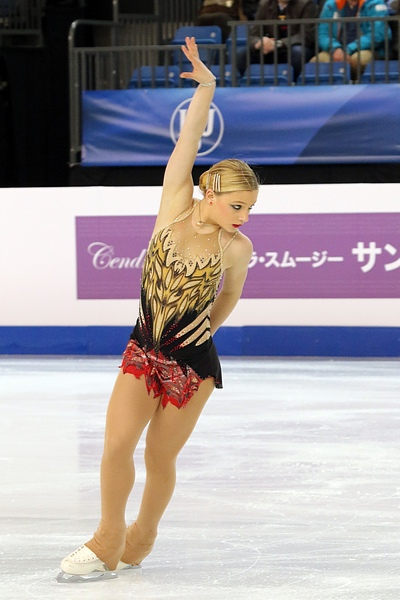
Gennaro at the 2016 Junior World Championships

==== 2015–2016 season ====
Coached by Ludmila Mladenova in Padua, Gennaro made her junior international debut in August 2015, placing seventh at the ISU Junior Grand Prix (JGP) in Bratislava, Slovakia. In December, she won her second junior national title. In February, she represented Italy at the 2016 Winter Youth Olympics in Hamar, Norway. She placed 9th in the individual ladies' event and her team finished seventh. At the 2016 World Junior Championships, held in March in Debrecen, Hungary, she qualified to the free skate and finished 19th overall (23rd in the short program, 17th in the free skate).

==== 2016–2017 season ====
Making her senior national debut, Gennaro placed fifth at the Italian Championships in December 2016. In February, she won the bronze medal at the 2017 European Youth Olympic Winter Festival in Erzurum, Turkey.

==== 2017–2018 season ====
Gennaro made her senior international debut in early November, at the 2017 Denkova-Staviski Cup, having become age-eligible at the beginning of the season. Although also eligible for junior events, she made no appearances on the junior level. She won three senior international medals – gold in January at the EduSport Trophy in Otopeni, Romania; bronze in March at the Sarajevo Open in Sarajevo, Bosnia and Herzegovina; and gold in April at the Triglav Trophy in Jesenice, Slovenia.

==== 2018–2019 season ====
Competing in the senior ranks, Gennaro won silver at the Denkova-Staviski Cup in November and placed 5th at the Italian Championships in December. In January, she represented Italy at the 2019 European Championships in Minsk, Belarus; she placed 16th in the short program and qualified to the final segment.

==== 2020–2021 season ====
Gennaro placed 7th at the 2021 Italian Championships.

=== Skating for Greece ===
==== 2024–2025 season ====
Gennaro began representing Greece internationally in the 2024–25 season. She debuted internationally for Greece at the 2025 Triglav Trophy finishing in 2nd place.

==== 2025–2026 season ====
At the 2026 European Championships, Lucrezia placed 36th in the short program and did not advance to the free skate.

== Programs ==
Season	Short program	Free skating
2025–2026	I Put a Spell on You by Screamin' Jay Hawkins performed by Kandace Springs & David Sanborn choreo. by Edoardo De Bernardis	Matador by Bernardo Bonezzi; Una Noche Más by Yasmin Levy, Yechiel Hasson, Alvaro Garrido, & Miles Danso choreo. by Edoardo De Bernardis
2019–2020	Sola by Nina Zilli choreo. by Edoardo De Bernardis	Dark Piano Limbo by Lucas King Piano; Mad World by J. Thompson; Dark Piano Mother by Lucas King Piano choreo. by Edoardo De Bernardis
2018–2019	Crazy in Love from Fifty Shades of Grey by Beyoncé	Bram Stoker's Dracula by Wojciech Kilar
2017–2018	Guarda che Luna by Emma Marrone; Gelosia	Bram Stoker's Dracula by Wojciech Kilar
2016–2017	Guarda che Luna by Emma Marrone; Gelosia	James Bond Theme by John Barry; Tomorrow Never Dies by Sheryl Crow; Hurricane 2000 by Scorpions
2015–2016	Feeling Good by Michael Bublé	Menouthis by E.S. Posthumus; Leyenda by Isaac Albéniz performed by Vanessa-Mae

== Competitive highlights ==
=== For Greece ===
Competition placements at senior level
Season	2024–25	2025–26	2026–27
European Championships		36th	
Denkova-Staviski Cup			7th
Triglav Trophy	2nd		

=== For Italy ===
JGP: Junior Grand Prix

International
Event	13–14	14–15	15–16	16–17	17–18	18–19	19–20	20–21
Europeans						19th		
CS Ice Star							14th	
Cup of Tyrol						7th		
Denkova-Staviski					10th	2nd		
EduSport Trophy					1st			
Merano Cup					WD			
Halloween Cup						4th		
Open Ice Mall						2nd		
Sofia Trophy					5th	2nd		
Sarajevo Open					3rd			
Triglav Trophy					1st			
International: Junior
Junior Worlds			19th					
Youth Olympics			9th					
JGP Italy					19th		10th	
JGP Poland			15th					
JGP Slovakia			7th					
JGP Slovenia				16th				
JGP U.S.							9th	
EYOF				3rd				
Cup of Tyrol				5th				
EduSport Trophy				1st				
Merano Cup			4th	1st				
Skate Celje				2nd				
International: Advanced novice
Bavarian Open		2nd						
Denkova-Staviski	4th	1st						
Gardena Trophy	2nd	3rd						
Heiko Fischer	1st							
Merano Cup		1st						
NRW Trophy		4th						
Triglav Trophy		3rd						
National
Italian Champ.		1st J	1st J	5th		5th	5th	7th
Team events
Youth Olympics			7th T 5th P					
J = Junior level T = Team result; P = Personal result

== Detailed results ==
=== For Greece ===
Results in the 2024–25 season
Date	Event	SP		FS		Total	
Date	Event	P	Score	P	Score	P	Score
Apr 9–13, 2025	(Italy) 2025 Triglav Trophy	3	52.29	1	109.34	2	161.63

Results in the 2025–26 season
Date	Event	SP		FS		Total	
Date	Event	P	Score	P	Score	P	Score
Jan 13–18, 2026	(United Kingdom) 2026 European Championships	36	43.20	—N/a	—N/a	36	43.20

Results in the 2026-27 season
Date	Event	SP		FS		Total	
Date	Event	P	Score	P	Score	P	Score
Nov 6–8, 2026	(Bulgaria) 2026 Denkova-Staviski Cup	6	56.92	8	105.77	7	162.69

=== For Italy ===
==== Senior results ====
2020–2021 season
Date	Event	SP	FS	Total
12–15 December 2019	2021 Italian Championships	8; 47.02	7; 94.88	7; 141.90
2019–2020 season
Date	Event	SP	FS	Total
12–15 December 2019	2020 Italian Championships	8; 47.48	5; 93.09	5; 140.37
18–20 October 2019	2019 Ice Star	13; 47.60	18; 79.39	14; 126.99
2018–2019 season
Date	Event	SP	FS	Total
2–3 March 2019	2019 Cup of Tyrol	9; 48.89	6; 97.76	7; 146.65
20–23 February 2019	2019 Open Ice Mall Cup	5; 46.99	1; 106.40	2; 153.39
5–10 February 2019	2019 Sofia Trophy	2; 58.24	2; 99.55	2; 157.79
15–21 January 2019	2019 European Championships	16; 52.91	20; 90.19	19; 143.10
13–16 December 2018	2019 Italian Championships	4; 53.13	6; 91.88	5; 145.01
27 November - 1 December 2018	2018 Denkova-Staviski Cup	2; 51.95	3; 96.52	2; 148.47
19–21 October 2018	2018 Halloween Cup	7; 47.63	3; 94.48	4; 142.11
2017–2018 season
Date	Event	SP	FS	Total
4–8 April 2018	2018 Triglav Trophy	2; 44.90	1; 89.21	1; 134.11
1–4 March 2018	2018 Sarajevo Open	3; 46.22	3; 88.06	3; 134.28
6–11 February 2018	2018 Sofia Trophy	8; 45.16	5; 89.96	5; 135.12
4–7 January 2018	2018 EduSport Trophy	1; 45.36	1; 76.31	1; 121.67
15–19 November 2017	2017 Merano Cup	10; 39.14	WD	WD
31 October - 4 November 2017	2017 Denkova-Staviski Cup	12; 39.05	9; 75.14	10; 114.19
2016–2017 season
Date	Event	SP	FS	Total
14–17 December 2016	2017 Italian Championships	6; 52.63	5; 100.33	5; 152.96

==== Junior results ====
2019–2020 season
Date	Event	SP	FS	Total
2–5 October 2019	2019 JGP Italy	9; 50.88	11; 95.44	10; 146.32
28–31 August 2019	2019 JGP United States	7; 53.77	10; 86.65	9; 140.42
2017–2018 season
Date	Event	SP	FS	Total
11–14 October 2017	2017 JGP Italy	16; 41.83	18; 73.04	19; 114.87
2016–2017 season
Date	Event	SP	FS	Total
28 February - 5 March 2017	2017 Cup of Tyrol	4; 46.53	4; 84.08	5; 130.61
13–15 February 2017	2017 European Youth Olympic Festival	4; 43.67	3; 81.86	3; 125.53
4–7 January 2017	2017 EduSport Trophy	1; 47.57	1; 64.63	1; 112.20
26–27 November 2016	2016 Skate Celje	2; 47.60	3; 80.46	2; 128.06
10–13 November 2016	2016 Merano Cup	2; 50.25	3; 84.70	1; 134.95
21–24 September 2016	2016 JGP Slovenia	22; 33.95	12; 76.42	16; 110.37
2015–2016 season
14–20 March 2016	2016 World junior Championships	23; 43.74	17; 81.51	19; 125.25
12–21 February 2016	2016 Winter Youth Olympics - team	-	5; 83.64	7T/5P
12–21 February 2016	2016 Winter Youth Olympics	11; 47.45	9; 86.73	9; 134.18
16–19 December 2015	2016 Italian Junior Championships	2; 43.59	1; 97.50	1; 141.09
12–15 November 2015	2015 Merano Cup	4; 41.12	4; 74.08	4; 115.20
9–12 September 2015	2015 JGP Poland	17; 38.34	14; 77.28	15; 115.62
19–23 August 2015	2015 JGP Slovakia	9; 43.30	7; 86.17	7; 129.47
2014–2015 season
7–8 February 2015	2015 Italian Junior Championships	2; 46.49	1; 79.16	1; 125.65
