= EduSport Trophy =

International figure skating competition

- Location: Romania

The EduSport Trophy is an annual international figure skating competition which is generally held in December or January in Romania. Medals may be awarded in men's singles, women's singles, and ice dance at various levels, which may include senior, junior, and novice, as well as recreational and adult skaters.

== Senior results ==
=== Men's singles ===
Year	Location	Gold	Silver	Bronze	Ref.
2019	Bucharest	(Philippines) Christopher Caluza	(Bulgaria) Nicky Leo Obreykov	(Slovakia) Michael Neuman	
2020	Bucharest	(Bulgaria) Larry Loupolover	(Hong Kong) Kwun Hung Leung	No other competitors	
2023 (Note: January 2023)	Otopeni	(United States) Joonsoo Kim	(Romania) Anelin George Enache	No other competitors	
2024	Otopeni	(Bulgaria) Beat Schümperli	(United Kingdom) Connor Bray	(Portugal) David Gouveia	

=== Women's singles ===
Year	Location	Gold	Silver	Bronze	Ref.
2017	Bucharest	(Norway) Anne Line Gjersem	No other competitors		
2018	Târgu Secuiesc	(Italy) Lucrezia Gennaro	(Greece) Dimitra Korri	(Romania) Irina Preda	
2019	Bucharest	(Czech Republic) Eliška Březinová	(Philippines) Alisson Krystle Perticheto	(Italy) Chenny Paolucci	
2020	Bucharest	(Italy) Lucrezia Beccari	(Bulgaria) Alexandra Feigin	(Switzerland) Yasmine Kimiko Yamada	
2023	Otopeni	(United Kingdom) Kristen Spours	(Romania) Julia Sauter	(United Kingdom) Nina Povey	
2023 (Note: December 2023)	Bucharest	(Italy) Marina Piredda	(Romania) Julia Sauter	(Lithuania) Aleksandra Golovkina	
2024	Otopeni	(Lithuania) Meda Variakojytė	(Italy) Carlotta Maria Gardini	(Serbia) Antonina Dubinina	

=== Ice dance ===
Year	Location	Gold	Silver	Bronze	Ref.
2024	Otopeni	(Lithuania); Paulina Ramanauskaite; Deividas Kizala	(Azerbaijan); Maxine Weatherby; Oleksandr Kolosovskyi	(Republic of Ireland); Carolane Soucisse; Shane Firus	

== Junior results ==
=== Men's singles ===
Year	Location	Gold	Silver	Bronze	Ref.
2017	Bucharest	(Bulgaria) Alexander Zlatov	(Romania) Andrei Tanase	No other competitors	
2018	Târgu Secuiesc	(Bulgaria) Radoslav Marinov	(Romania) Andrei Tanase	No other competitors	
2019	Bucharest	(Hong Kong) Naoki Ma	(Romania) Andrei Tanase	(Romania) Sebastian Radovan	
2020	Bucharest	(Hong Kong) Naoki Ma	(Bulgaria) Filip Kaimakchiev	No other competitors	
2023	Otopeni	(Israel) Nikita Sheiko	(Israel) Iakov Pogrebinskii	(Israel) Tamir Kuperman	
2024	Bucharest	(Israel) Nikita Sheiko	(Ukraine) Vadym Novikov	(Turkey) Mehmet Cenkay Karlikli	
2024	Bucharest	(Poland) Oscar Oliver	(Lithuania) Daniel Korabelnik	(Ukraine) Mark Kulish	

=== Women's singles ===
Year	Location	Gold	Silver	Bronze	Ref.
2017	Bucharest	(Italy) Lucrezia Gennaro	(Moldova) Anna Ivancenko	(Moldova) Ecaterina Ivancenka	
2018	Târgu Secuiesc	(Romania) Ana Sofia Beschea	(Serbia) Leona Rogic	(Romania) Bristena Prodea	
2019	Bucharest	(Italy) Lucrezia Beccari	(Norway) Silja Anna Skulstad Urang	(Italy) Serena Joy Roblin	
2020	Bucharest	(Romania) Ramona Andreea Voicu	(Romania) Ana Sofia Beschea	(Australia) Amelia Scarlett Jackson	
2023	Otopeni	(Israel) Mariia Dmitrieva	(Israel) Elizabet Gervits	(Ukraine) Anastasiia Vasylchenko	
2023	Bucharest	(Italy) Irina Napolitano	(Italy) Carlotta Maria Gardini	(Slovenia) Zoja Kramar	
2024	Bucharest	(Hungary) Polina Dzsumanyijazova	(Netherlands) Angel Delevaque	(Slovakia) Olívia Lengyelová	

=== Ice dance ===
Year	Location	Gold	Silver	Bronze	Ref.
2024	Otopeni	(France); Alisa Ovsiankina; Maximilien Rahier	(France); Lea Hienne; Louis Varescon	(United Kingdom); Mimi Marler Davies; Joesph Black	
