= Anastasia Gozhva =

Ukrainian figure skater (born 2001)

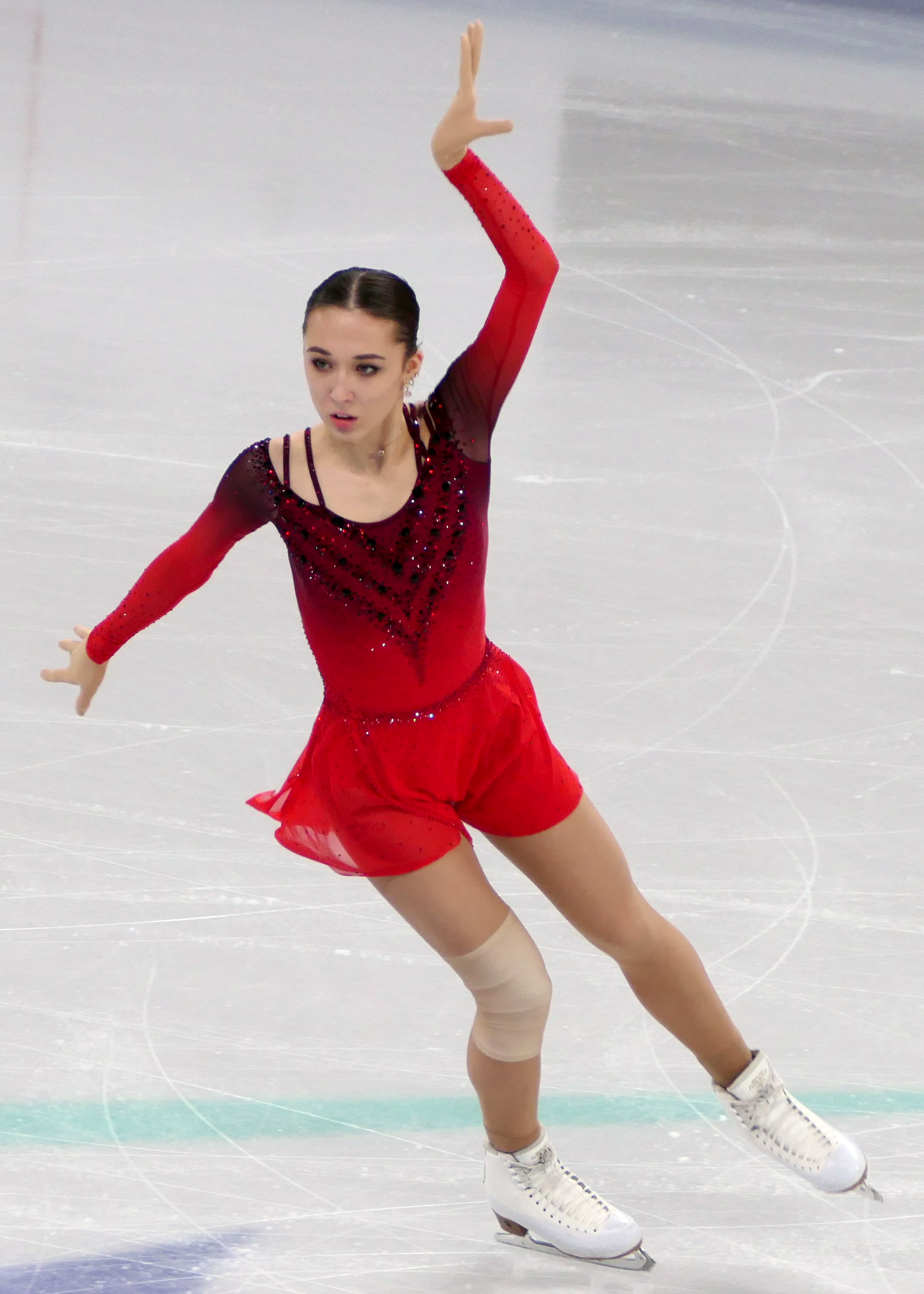
- Anastasia Gozhva at the 2024 World Championships

Personal information
- Native name: Анастасія Гожва
- Other names: Anastasiya, Anastasiia Hozhva
- Born: 5 December 2001 (age 24) Kyiv, Ukraine
- Height: 1.67 m (5 ft 5 1/2 in)

Figure skating career
- Country: Ukraine
- Discipline: Women's singles
- Coach: Olga Kurovska; Marina Amirkhanova; Vitali Egorov; Sergei Rozanov
- Skating club: Leader Kyiv
- Began skating: 2004

Medal record
Ukrainian Championships
Gold medal – first place	2016 Kyiv	Singles
Gold medal – first place	2023 Bohuslav	Singles
Gold medal – first place	2024 Bohuslav	Singles
Silver medal – second place	2017 Kyiv	Singles
Silver medal – second place	2022 Kyiv	Singles
Bronze medal – third place	2018 Kyiv	Singles
Bronze medal – third place	2020 Kyiv	Singles

Anastasia Volodymyrivna Gozhva or Anastasiia Volodymyrivna Hozhva (Ukrainian: Анастасія Володимирівна Гожва, born 5 December 2001) is a Ukrainian figure skater. She is the 2019 Jégvirág Cup champion and a three-time Ukrainian national champion (2016, 2023–24).

== Personal life ==
Gozhva was born on 5 December 2001 in Kyiv. Her sister, Daria (one year older), is also a competitive figure skater. After the Russian invasion of Ukraine, Gozhva and her family fled to Tallinn, Estonia. She returned to Ukraine one year later.

Gozhva is currently a student at the National University of Ukraine on Physical Education and Sport.

She has a pet beagle named Ronya.

== Career ==
=== Early career ===
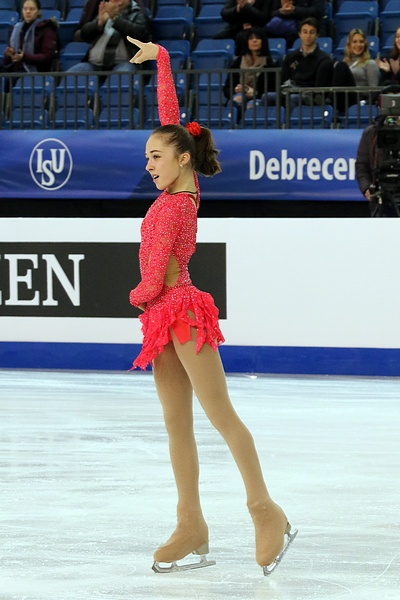
Gozhva at the 2016 World Junior Championships

Gozhva began learning to skate in 2004. In the 2015–16 season, she won both the junior and senior Ukrainian national titles. Too young to compete in senior internationals, she was sent to the 2016 World Junior Championships in Debrecen, Hungary. She qualified for the free skate by placing 13th in the short program and finished 17th overall.

In February 2017, Gozhva won the silver medal at the 2017 European Youth Olympic Winter Festival in Erzurum, Turkey. She made her senior international debut in September at the 2017 CS Ondrej Nepela Trophy.

=== 2018–2019 season ===
Gozhva placed fourth at the 2019 Ukrainian Championships. Because none of the medalists met the minimum age or TES requirements, she was named in Ukraine's team to the 2019 European Championships in Minsk, Belarus. Ranked 36th in the short program, she did not advance to the free skate. In February, she outscored Nicole Schott by 1.16 points to win gold at the Jégvirág Cup in Hungary.

=== 2019–20 season ===
Gozhva began her season at the 2019 CS Nebelhorn Trophy, where she finished sixteenth.

She went on to compete at the 2020 European Championships in Graz, Austria, where she placed thirty-fourth in the short program, failing to advance to the free skate segment of the competition.

=== 2020–21 season ===
Gozhva sat out the 2020–21 figure skating season.

=== 2021–22 season ===
Gozhva began the season with finishing fifteenth at the 2021 Budapest Trophy. She went on to win silver at the 2021 Autumn Talents Club and finish nineteenth at the 2021 CS Warsaw Cup.

She finished the season with a silver medal at the 2022 Ukrainian Championships.

In late February, Vladimir Putin ordered an invasion of Ukraine, as a result of which the International Skating Union banned all Russian and Belarusian skaters from competing. Gozvha was at home in Kyiv during the first attacks. As a result, Gozhva relocated to Tallinn, Estonia, where she began training under Irina Kononova, in addition to continuing to work with her longtime coach, Marina Amirkhanova.

=== 2022–23 season ===
Gozhva began the season with thirteenth-place finish at the 2022 CS Nebelhorn Trophy. She went on to compete at the 2022 Volvo Open Cup and the 2022 Tallinn Trophy, placing fifth and sixth, respectively.

At the 2022 CS Golden Spin of Zagreb, Gozhva placed tenth, scoring a personal best free program and combined total score in the process.

Selected to compete at the 2023 Winter University Games, Gozhva scored a personal best in the short program placed eighth overall.

Competing at her third European Championships in Espoo, Finland, Gozhva placed twenty-second in the short program and seventeenth in the free skate, placing twentieth overall.

Gozhva closed her season by winning her second national title at the 2023 Ukrainian Championships.

=== 2023–24 season ===
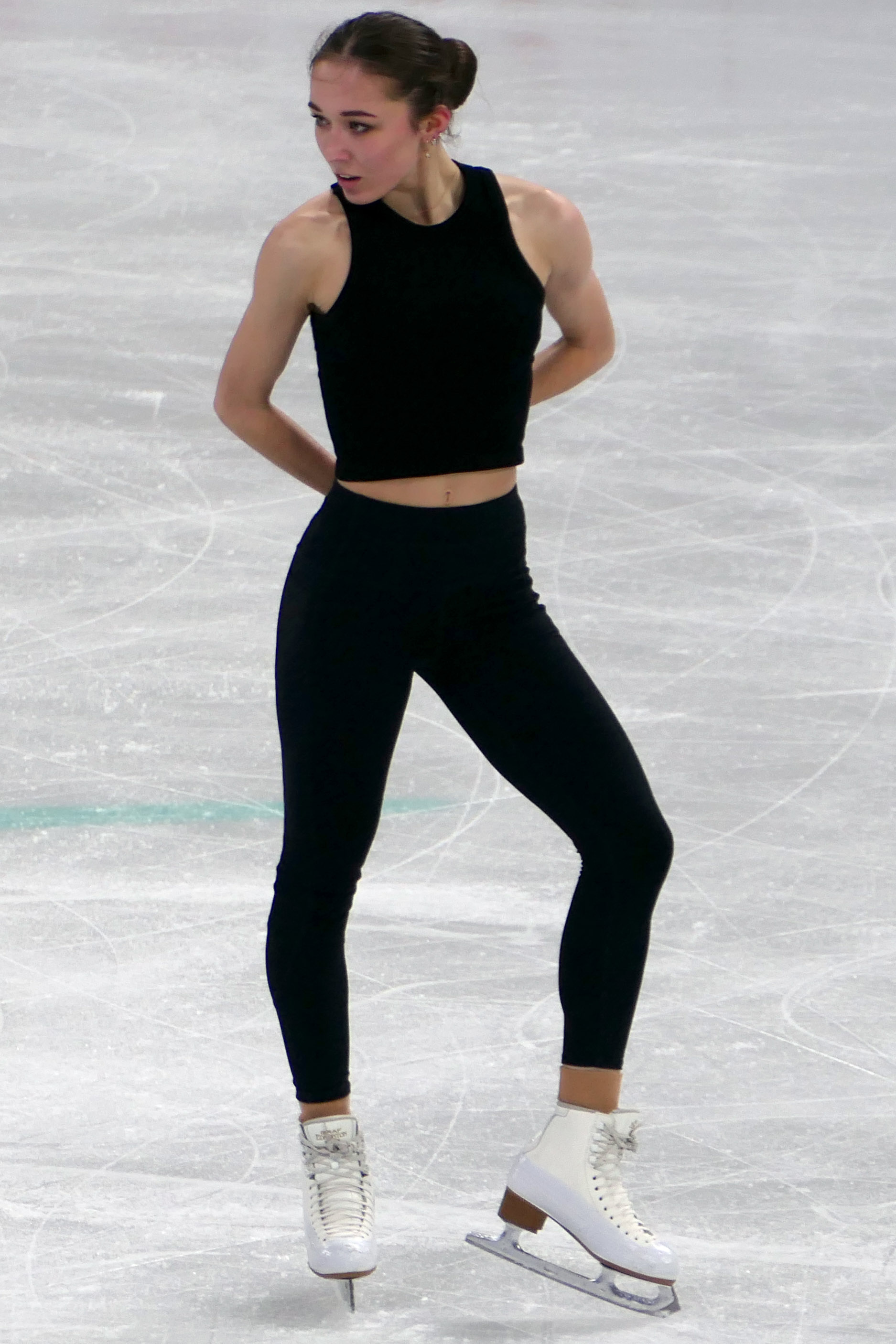
Gozhva at a practice session at the 2024 World Championships

Prior to the season, it was announced that Gozhva had returned to her hometown of Kyiv and had resumed training there. She began the season by finishing seventh, thirteenth, and fifth at the 2023 Jelgava Cup, the 2023 CS Nepela Memorial, and the Tirnavia Ice Cup, respectively. She went on to win silver at the 2023 Denkova Staviski Cup and gold at 2023 Skate Celje. At the 2023 CS Golden Spin of Zagreb, Gozhva would place fourth.

Selected to compete at the 2024 European Championships in Kaunas, Lithuania, Gozhva finished twentieth. Two months later, making her debut at the World Championships, held in Montreal, Quebec, Canada, Gozhva finished in thirty-fourth place.

She closed the season by winning her third national title at the 2024 Ukrainian Championships.

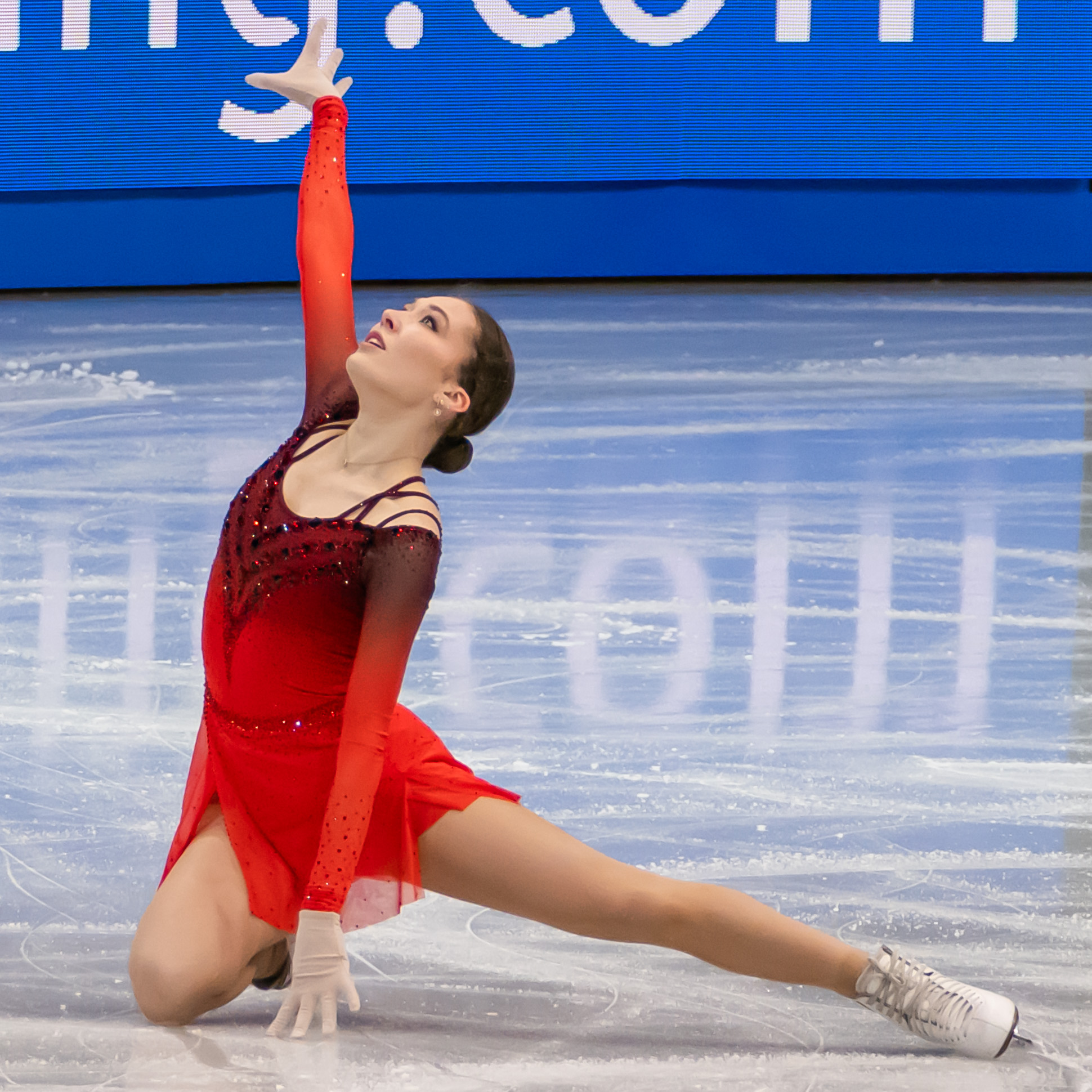
Gozhva performing her short program at the 2025 World Championships

=== 2024–25 season ===
Gozhva began the season by competing on the 2024–25 ISU Challenger Series, finishing eighteenth at the 2024 Lombardia Trophy and ninth at the 2024 Denis Ten Memorial Challenge. She subsequently finished ninth at the 2024 Diamond Spin, eleventh at the 2024 Denkova-Staviski Cup, and fourth at the 2024 Skate Celje.

In January, Gozhva placed nineteenth at the 2025 Winter World University Games in Turin, Italy. The following week, she competed at the 2025 European Championships in Tallinn, Estonia, where she placed twenty-seventh. She then finished the season by finishing thirty-third at the 2025 World Championships in Boston, Massachusetts, United States.

=== 2025–26 season ===
Gozhva did not compete during the 2025–2026 season.

== Programs ==
Season	Short program	Free skating
2024–25	Passion (Arubinoni: Adagio) by Tomaso Albinoni performed by Ikuko Kawai choreo. by Iryna Chubarets	Proud by Tamara Todevska, Darko Dimitrov, Robert Bilbilov, & Lazar Cvetkoski choreo. by Iryna Chubarets
2023–24	Vuelvo al Sur by Astor Piazzolla & Fernando Solanas performed by Gotan Project choreo. by Iryna Chubarets	Proud by Tamara Todevska, Darko Dimitrov, Robert Bilbilov, & Lazar Cvetkoski choreo. by Iryna Chubarets
2022–23	Am I the One by Beth Hart choreo. by Irina Chubarets	Love and War by Fleurie; Lacrymosa by Evanescence choreo. by Mariia Tumanovska-Chaika
2021–22	Am I the One by Beth Hart choreo. by Irina Chubarets	Love and War by Fleurie; Lacrymosa by Evanescence choreo. by Mariia Tumanovska-Chaika
2019–20	Please by Elijah Bossenbroek choreo. by Mariia Tumanovska-Chaika	Love and War by Fleurie; Lacrymosa by Evanescence choreo. by Mariia Tumanovska-Chaika
2018–19	Please by Elijah Bossenbroek choreo. by Mariia Tumanovska-Chaika	Cats by Andrew Lloyd Webber choreo. by Mariia Tumanovska-Chaika
2017–18	Please by Elijah Bossenbroek choreo. by Mariia Tumanovska-Chaika	Cats by Andrew Lloyd Webber choreo. by Mariia Tumanovska-Chaika
2016–17	Cha Cha Cha; Banto by Kaoma choreo. by Mariia Tumanovska-Chaika	Cats by Andrew Lloyd Webber choreo. by Mariia Tumanovska-Chaika
2015–16	Cha Cha Cha; Banto by Kaoma choreo. by Mariia Tumanovska-Chaika	Harem (Canção do Mar) by Sarah Brightman; Harem by Pariso choreo. by Irina Chubarets
2014–15		Harem (Canção do Mar) by Sarah Brightman; Harem by Pariso choreo. by Irina Chubarets

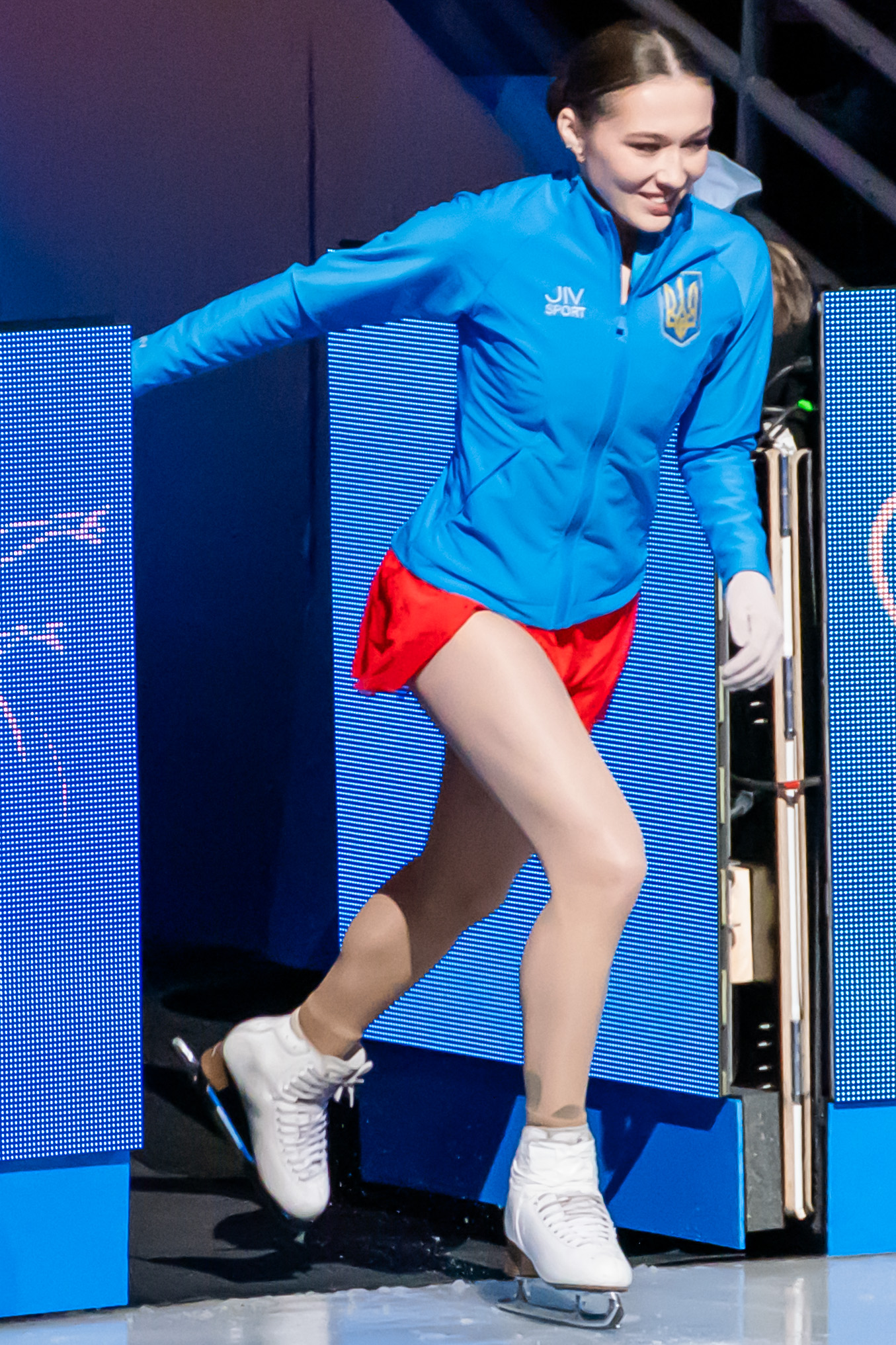
Anastasia at the 2025 World Championships

== Competitive highlights ==
- JGP – Event of the ISU Junior Grand Prix Series
- CS – Event of the ISU Challenger Series
- TBD – Assigned
- WD – Withdrew from competition

Competition placements at senior level
Season	2015–16	2016–17	2017–18	2018–19	2019–20	2020–21	2021–22	2022–23	2023–24	2024–25
World Championships									34th	33rd
European Championships				36th	34th			20th	20th	27th
Ukrainian Championships	1st	2nd	3rd	4th	3rd	WD	2nd	1st	1st	
CS Budapest Trophy							15th			
CS Denis Ten Memorial										9th
CS Golden Spin of Zagreb								10th	4th	
CS Lombardia Trophy										18th
CS Nebelhorn Trophy					16th			13th		
CS Nepela Memorial			14th						13th	
CS Warsaw Cup							19th			
Autumn Talents Cup							2nd			
Denkova-Staviski Cup									2nd	11th
Diamond Spin										9th
Jégvirág Cup				1st						
Jelgava Cup									7th	
Skate Celje									1st	4th
Tallink Hotels Cup								WD		
Tallinn Trophy								6th		
Tirnavia Ice Cup									5th	
Volvo Open Cup								5th		
Winter University Games								8th		19th

Competition placements at junior level
Season	2014–15	2015–16	2016–17
World Junior Championships		17th	26th
Ukrainian Championships	2nd	1st	3rd
JGP Germany			22nd
JGP Latvia		9th	
JGP Poland		14th	
JGP Slovenia			14th
Bavarian Open		3rd	
European Youth Olympic Festival			2nd
Tallinn Trophy		4th	

== Detailed results ==
ISU personal best scores in the +5/-5 GOE System
Segment	Type	Score	Event
Total	TSS	163.77	2023 CS Golden Spin of Zagreb
Short program	TSS	57.83	2024 European Championships
Short program	TES	32.41	2024 European Championships
Short program	PCS	26.13	2024 CS Denis Ten Memorial Challenge
Free skating	TSS	109.58	2023 CS Golden Spin of Zagreb
Free skating	TES	56.99	2023 CS Golden Spin of Zagreb
Free skating	PCS	52.73	2024 CS Denis Ten Memorial Challenge

=== Senior level ===
Results in the 2024–25 season
Date	Event	SP		FS		Total	
Date	Event	P	Score	P	Score	P	Score
Sep 13–15, 2024	(Italy) 2024 CS Lombardia Trophy	19	41.30	17	79.17	18	120.47
Oct 3–6, 2024	(Kazakhstan) 2024 CS Denis Ten Memorial Challenge	9	53.64	8	100.58	9	154.22
Oct 15–20, 2024	(Poland) 2024 Diamond Spin	13	36.53	7	88.13	9	124.66
Nov 5–10, 2024	(Bulgaria) 2024 Denkova-Staviski Cup	10	51.21	10	99.05	11	150.26
Nov 14–17, 2024	(Slovenia) 2024 Skate Celje	6	43.42	2	95.82	4	139.24
Jan 16–18, 2024	(Italy) 2025 Winter World University Games	19	43.52	16	90.85	19	134.37
Jan 28–Feb 2, 2025	(Estonia) 2025 European Championships	27	42.21	—N/a	—N/a	27	42.21
Mar 25–30, 2025	(United States) 2025 World Championships	33	37.54	—N/a	—N/a	33	37.54

2023-24 season
Date	Event	SP	FS	Total
18–24 March 2024	2024 World Championships	34; 40.28	-	34; 40.28
10–14 January 2024	2024 European Championships	11; 57.83	20; 93.67	20; 151.50
6–9 December 2023	2023 CS Golden Spin of Zagreb	5; 54.19	4; 109.58	4; 163.77
16–19 November 2023	2023 Skate Celje	1; 59.91	1; 100.79	1; 160.70
7–12 November 2023	2023 Denkova-Staviski Cup	3; 55.38	2; 107.23	2; 162.61
27–29 October 2023	2023 Tirnavia Ice Cup	7; 48.05	5; 95.47	5; 143.52
28–30 September 2023	2023 CS Nepela Memorial	13; 49.04	13; 85.17	13; 134.21
16–17 September 2023	2023 Jeglava Cup	9; 40.87	4; 102.29	7; 143.16
2022–23 season
Date	Event	SP	FS	Total
8–9 April 2023	2023 Ukrainian Championships	1; 61.35	1; 100.95	1; 162.30
16–19 February 2023	2023 Tallink Hotels Cup	8; 51.34	WD	WD
25–29 January 2023	2023 European Championships	22; 46.78	17; 96.91	20; 143.69
13–15 January 2023	2023 Winter World University Games	9; 57.50	9; 95.99	8; 153.49
7–10 December 2022	2022 CS Golden Spin of Zagreb	7; 52.35	10; 102.88	10; 155.23
24–27 November 2022	2022 Tallinn Trophy	8; 48.76	5; 97.58	6; 146.34
3–4 November 2022	2022 Volvo Open Cup	2; 56.31	7; 98.77	5; 155.08
21–24 September 2022	2022 CS Nebelhorn Trophy	16; 37.67	13; 91.64	13; 129.31
2021–22 season
Date	Event	SP	FS	Total
7–8 December 2021	2022 Ukrainian Championships	2; 62.18	2; 118.80	2; 180.98
17–20 November 2021	2021 CS Warsaw Cup	24; 42.95	15; 96.58	19; 139.53
27–30 October 2021	2021 Autumn Talents Cup	4; 41.69	2; 82.84	2; 129.34
14–17 October 2021	2021 Budapest Trophy	17; 39.85	15; 84.60	15; 124.45
2019–20 season
Date	Event	SP	FS	Total
20–26 January 2020	2020 European Championships	34; 40.49	–	34; 40.49
17–19 December 2020	2020 Ukrainian Championships	2; 50.08	5; 89.26	3; 139.34
25–28 September 2019	2019 CS Nebelhorn Trophy	16; 44.21	15; 83.59	16; 127.80
2018–19 season
Date	Event	SP	FS	Total
15–17 February 2019	2019 Jégvirág Cup	3; 46.69	2; 89.46	1; 136.15
21–27 January 2019	2019 European Championships	36; 35.51	–	36; 35.51
17–20 December 2018	2019 Ukrainian Championships	4; 47.54	5; 84.57	4; 132.11
2017–18 season
Date	Event	SP	FS	Total
17–20 December 2017	2018 Ukrainian Championships	3; 48.26	3; 77.98	3; 126.24
21–23 September 2017	2017 CS Ondrej Nepela Trophy	14; 42.73	14; 85.64	14; 128.37
2016–17 season
Date	Event	SP	FS	Total
1–2 December 2016	2017 Ukrainian Championships	2; 55.51	2; 93.27	2; 148.78
2015–16 season
Date	Event	SP	FS	Total
18–19 December 2015	2016 Ukrainian Championships	2; 50.07	1; 116.70	1; 166.77

=== Junior level ===
2018–19 season
Date	Event	SP	FS	Total
4–7 February 2019	2019 Ukrainian Junior Championships	2; 58.53	2; 92.45	2; 150.98
2016–17 season
Date	Event	SP	FS	Total
15–19 March 2017	2017 World Junior Championships	26; 44.21	–	26; 44.21
27 February–2 March 2017	2017 Ukrainian Junior Championships	3; 51.59	3; 89.92	3; 141.51
13–15 February 2017	2017 European Youth Olympic Festival	2; 49.78	7; 77.40	2; 127.18
5–8 October 2016	2016 JGP Germany	22; 42.71	20; 75.21	22; 117.92
21–24 September 2016	2016 JGP Slovenia	12; 47.33	17; 69.36	14; 116.69
2015–16 season
Date	Event	SP	FS	Total
14–20 March 2016	2016 World Junior Championships	13; 50.99	18; 81.28	17; 132.27
17–21 February 2016	2016 Bavarian Open	3; 54.02	5; 82.68	3; 136.70
19–21 January 2016	2016 Ukrainian Junior Championships	2; 47.03	1; 96.85	1; 143.88
17–22 November 2015	2015 Tallinn Trophy	5; 46.67	4; 105.72	4; 152.39
23–26 September 2015	2015 JGP Poland	15; 40.39	12; 79.33	14; 119.72
26–30 August 2015	2015 JGP Latvia	7; 53.09	13; 86.13	9; 139.22
2014–15 season
Date	Event	SP	FS	Total
12–14 February 2015	2015 Ukrainian Junior Championships	3; 44.85	1; 90.50	2; 135.35
