= David Richardson (figure skater) =

British figure skater

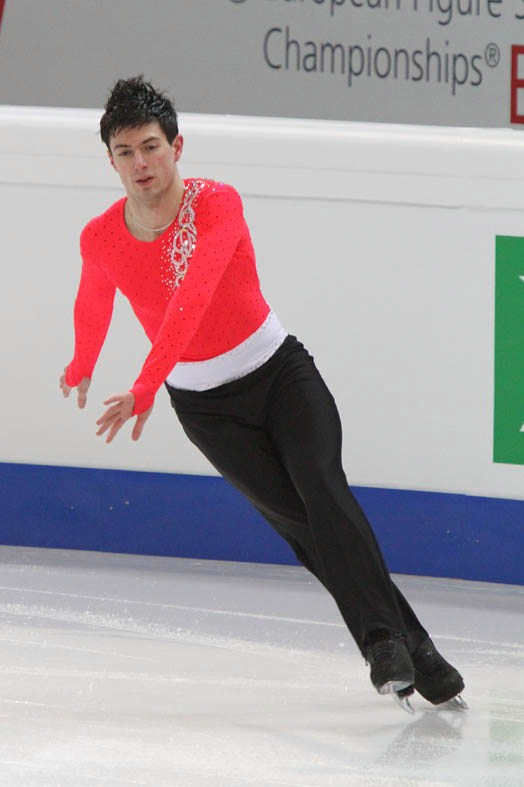
- David Richardson at the 2011 European Figure Skating Championships

Personal information
- Born: 18 August 1987 (age 39) Newcastle upon Tyne, England
- Height: 1.75 m (5 ft 9 in)

Figure skating career
- Country: United Kingdom
- Skating club: NIC Nottingham
- Began skating: 1995

David Richardson (born 18 August 1987) is a British former competitive figure skater. He is the 2011 British national champion and 2013 Golden Bear of Zagreb champion. He qualified for the free skate at the 2012 World Junior Championships in Ljubljana, Slovenia, where he finished 23rd overall.

Richardson trained at the NIC Nottingham. He last competed in the 2013–14 season.

== Programs ==
Season	Short program	Free skating
2010–2011	Cirque du Soleil	Sarabande by Edvin Marton, Caroline D'Hoe, Escala
2005–2006	Moulin Rouge! by Jose Feliciano	Storm performed by Vanessa-Mae (based on Four Seasons by Antonio Vivaldi)

== Results ==
JGP: Junior Grand Prix

International
Event	04–05	05–06	06–07	07–08	08–09	09–10	10–11	11–12	12–13	13–14
Worlds							15th PR			
Europeans							12th PR			
Challenge Cup								13th		
Crystal Skate									8th	
Cup of Nice								20th		
Dragon Trophy									4th	
Golden Bear										1st
Golden Spin								13th	4th	8th
Ice Challenge						23rd	7th			
Nepela Trophy				17th		18th	8th	16th	15th	12th
Printemps									5th	
Triglav Trophy								9th		
Universiade			25th							
Volvo Open Cup										12th
International: Junior
Junior Worlds		23rd								
JGP Hungary		17th								
JGP Netherlands		12th								
JGP Slovakia	11th									
Dragon Trophy		5th J.								
National
British Championships	5th J.	1st J.	3rd	4th	2nd	3rd	1st	6th	3rd	3rd
Belgian Championships				2nd (Note: Guest skater)						
