= 2014–15 Japan Figure Skating Championships =

Figure skating competition

- Type: National championship
- Date: December 26–28, 2014 (S); November 22–24, 2014 (J)
- Season: 2014–15
- Location: Nagano
- Venue: Big Hat (S); Niigata Asahi Alex Ice Arena (J)

Champions
- Men's singles: Yuzuru Hanyu (S); Shoma Uno (J)
- Ladies' singles: Satoko Miyahara (S); Wakaba Higuchi (J)
- Pairs: Narumi Takahashi / Ryuichi Kihara (S); Ami Koga / Francis Boudreau-Audet (J)
- Ice dance: Cathy Reed / Chris Reed (S); Rikako Fukase / Aru Tateno (J)
- Previous: 2013–14 Japan Championships
- Next: 2015–16 Japan Championships

The 2014–15 Japan Figure Skating Championships took place on December 26–28, 2014 at the Big Hat in Nagano. It was the 83rd edition of the event. Medals were awarded in the disciplines of men's singles, ladies' singles, pair skating, and ice dancing.

== Results ==
=== Men ===
Rank	Name	Club	Total points	SP		FS	
1	Yuzuru Hanyu	ANA	286.86	1	94.36	1	192.50
2	Shoma Uno	中京大中京高校	251.28	3	85.53	3	165.75
3	Takahiko Kozuka	トヨタ自動車	245.68	6	72.39	2	173.29
4	Tatsuki Machida	関西大学	242.61	2	90.16	5	152.45
5	Takahito Mura	HIROTA	236.40	5	78.54	4	157.86
6	Sota Yamamoto	邦和スポーツランド	206.80	7	67.19	6	139.61
7	Daisuke Murakami	陽進堂	202.08	4	81.26	8	120.82
8	Keiji Tanaka	倉敷芸術科学大学	187.43	9	62.83	7	124.60
9	Ryuju Hino	中京大学	181.33	10	61.23	9	120.10
10	Hiroaki Sato	岩手大学	174.42	8	66.21	14	108.21
11	Daichi Miyata	ﾊﾟﾋﾟｵﾌｨｷﾞｭｱｸﾗﾌﾞ	172.79	12	57.32	10	115.47
12	Shu Nakamura	関大北陽スケート部	170.01	11	60.07	13	109.94
13	Yoji Tsuboi	岡山大学	167.10	15	55.26	12	111.84
14	Jun Suzuki	ROYCE'F･S･C	166.17	17	54.34	11	111.83
15	Masato Kimura	八戸GOLD F･S･C	162.33	14	55.34	15	106.99
16	Kohei Yoshino	関西大学	158.60	18	52.88	16	105.72
17	Daisuke Isozaki	同志社大学F	158.05	13	56.04	17	102.01
18	Kazuki Tomono	浪速高校ｽｹｰﾄ部	151.35	20	51.38	18	99.97
19	Ryoichi Yuasa	関西大学	151.19	19	52.08	19	99.11
20	Kosuke Nozoe	明治大学	150.00	21	51.26	21	98.74
21	Eiki Hattori	法政大学	149.32	22	50.53	20	98.79
22	Yuta Onuma	日本大学	147.98	16	54.32	22	93.66
23	Satoshi Nakamura	山梨学院大学	128.40	24	48.21	23	80.19
24	Keiichiro Sasahara	大阪スケート倶楽部	123.89	23	49.00	24	74.89
Did not advance to free skating
25	Takaya Hashizume	中京大学		25	46.99	—	
26	Ryota Katada	オリオンFSC		26	46.71	—	
27	Takumi Yamamoto	関西学院大学		27	46.08	—	
28	Jo Matsumura	明治大学		28	46.00	—	
29	Rintaro Furuya	北九州FSC		29	39.05	—	
30	Hidetsugu Kamata	シチズンクラブ		30	37.85	—	

=== Ladies ===
Rank	Name	Club	Total points	SP		FS	
1	Satoko Miyahara	関西大中・高スケート部	195.60	2	64.48	1	131.12
2	Rika Hongo	愛知みずほ大瑞穂高	188.63	1	66.70	2	121.93
3	Wakaba Higuchi	日本橋女学館	181.82	3	64.35	3	116.85
4	Yuka Nagai	駒場学園高	168.55	6	58.00	5	110.55
5	Kanako Murakami	中京大	168.29	9	57.55	4	110.74
6	Kaori Sakamoto	神戸FSC	167.46	7	57.81	6	109.65
7	Riona Kato	長尾谷高	165.53	5	58.10	7	107.43
8	Mariko Kihara	京都醍醐FSC	163.58	8	57.57	8	106.01
9	Mai Mihara	神戸PFSC	158.81	13	53.23	9	105.58
10	Miyu Nakashio	広島スケートクラブ	158.43	4	60.07	12	98.36
11	Haruka Imai	新潟県連	158.03	10	56.95	11	101.08
12	Miyabi Oba	中京大	156.35	18	51.21	10	105.14
13	Rin Nitaya	愛知みずほ大瑞穂高	150.59	12	54.69	13	95.90
14	Yuki Nishino	明治大	147.48	11	55.65	16	91.83
15	Yura Matsuda	中京大中京高	145.05	15	52.07	15	92.98
16	Saya Ueno	関西大	140.69	16	51.81	18	88.88
17	Ayaka Hosoda	関西大	139.74	20	46.17	14	93.57
18	Haruna Suzuki	日体荏原高スケート部	137.66	14	52.83	19	84.83
19	Shoko Ishikawa	ムサシノFSクラブ	134.99	22	44.98	17	90.01
20	Nana Matsushima	早稲田大	130.61	17	51.47	21	79.14
21	Ibuki Mori	中京大中京高	129.78	21	46.05	20	83.73
22	Yuka Kono	中京大	121.89	24	43.23	22	78.66
23	Kaho Komaki	就実学園	116.35	19	46.73	23	69.62
24	Kako Tomotaki	倉敷芸術科学大	110.84	23	43.27	24	67.57
Did not advance to free skating
25	Hinano Isobe	立命館宇治高校		25	41.03	—	
26	Hiyori Tokura	京都アクアリーナSC		26	38.95	—	
27	Mao Watanabe	中京大学		27	38.05	—	
28	Sakura Yamada	ｱｸｱﾋﾟｱｽｹｰﾃｨﾝｸﾞC		28	37.03	—	
29	Miyuki Takei	関西学院大学		29	36.87	—	
30	Uruha Takahashi	札幌大学		30	33.67	—	

=== Pairs ===
Rank	Name	Club	Total points	SP		FS	
1	Narumi Takahashi / Ryuichi Kihara	木下クラブ	150.94	1	50.18	1	100.76

=== Ice dancing ===
Rank	Name	Club	Total points	SP		FS	
1	Cathy Reed / Chris Reed	木下クラブ	146.80	1	57.18	1	89.62
2	Emi Hirai / Marien de la Asuncion	大阪スケート倶楽部	136.80	2	51.54	2	85.26
3	Kana Muramoto / Hiroichi Noguchi	関西大／明治大	128.28	3	50.90	3	77.38
4	Kei Nishiura / Kentaro Suzuki	日本大／明治大	103.92	4	39.76	4	64.16

== Japan Junior Figure Skating Championships ==
The 2014–15 Junior Championships took place on November 22–24, 2014 at the Niigata Asahi Alex Ice Arena in Niigata (city). Medals were awarded in men's singles, ladies' singles, and ice dancing. There was no junior pairs event during the Junior Championship. Junior pairs event was held during the senior competition on December 26–28, 2014.

=== Men ===
Rank	Name	Club	Total points	SP		FS	
1	Shoma Uno		210.72	1	82.72	2	128.00
2	Sota Yamamoto		202.50	2	67.81	1	134.69
3	Shu Nakamura		184.08	3	61.63	3	122.45
4	Kazuki Tomono		177.23	4	58.38	4	118.85
5	Daichi Miyata		169.92	5	57.68	7	112.24
6	Hidetsuku Kamata		168.61	7	53.30	6	115.31
7	Taichiro Yamakuma		166.01	10	49.28	5	116.73
8	Kousuke Nakano		160.09	6	54.83	8	105.26
9	Tsunehito Karakawa		153.05	13	48.89	9	104.16
10	Kento Kobayashi		151.63	16	48.12	10	103.51
11	Sei Kawahara		150.94	9	50.14	12	100.80
12	Ryo Sagami		149.39	11	49.15	13	100.24
13	Kento Kajita		146.35	24	45.11	11	101.24
14	Junya Watanabe		144.83	23	45.83	14	99.00
15	Kotaro Takeuchi		144.36	14	48.80	15	95.56
16	Koshiro Shimada		143.03	8	51.47	19	91.56
17	Genki Suzuki		142.11	19	46.76	16	95.35
18	Junsuke Tokikuni		140.64	12	48.98	18	91.66
19	Naoki Oda		140.13	21	46.38	17	93.75
20	Yoji Nakano		138.44	17	47.98	20	90.46
21	Shion Kamada		130.87	18	47.89	21	83.58
22	Naoya Watanabe		129.26	20	46.49	22	82.77
23	Kazuki Kushida		125.72	15	48.68	24	77.04
24	Yuto Kishina		123.53	22	46.38	23	77.15
Did not advance to free skating
25	Shingo Nishiyama			25	43.92	—	
26	Takayuki Yamamoto			26	42.55	—	
27	Kakeru Saitoh			27	40.95	—	
28	Reo Ishizuka			28	40.30	—	
29	Kanata Mori			29	40.25	—	
30	Sena Miyake			30	39.86	—	

=== Ladies ===
Rank	Name	Club	Total points	SP		FS	
1	Wakaba Higuchi	日本橋女学館	187.95	1	63.98	1	123.97
2	Kaori Sakamoto	神戸FSC	168.82	4	57.35	3	111.47
3	Yuka Nagai	駒場学園高校	168.74	2	61.49	4	107.25
4	Marin Honda	関西大学中・高ｽｹｰﾄ部	167.92	7	53.09	2	114.83
5	Yuna Aoki	神奈川FSC	163.68	3	60.37	6	103.31
6	Yura Matsuda	中京大中京高校	155.00	5	56.41	9	98.59
7	Mai Mihara	神戸PFSC	154.60	6	53.47	8	101.13
8	Rin Nitaya	愛知みずほ大瑞穂高校	154.28	10	49.73	5	104.55
9	Emiri Nagata	名東FSC	151.34	9	49.89	7	101.45
10	Kokoro Iwamoto	関西大学中・高ｽｹｰﾄ部	143.02	8	50.27	10	92.75
11	Saya Suzuki	邦和SC	140.16	11	47.99	11	92.17
12	Yukino Fuji	ﾊﾟﾋﾟｵﾌｨｷﾞｭｱｸﾗﾌﾞ	136.47	17	45.19	12	91.28
13	Hina Takeno	沖学園	133.46	12	47.35	13	86.11
14	Yuka Kito	武蔵野学院	131.66	14	46.38	14	85.28
15	Tomoe Kawabata	シチズンクラブ	127.20	13	47.09	15	80.11
16	Misaki Morishita	ｱｸｱﾋﾟｱｽｹｰﾃｨﾝｸﾞC	123.05	15	46.29	17	76.76
17	Mina Taniguchi	中京大中京高校	120.72	20	43.87	16	78.21
18	Riko Ohashi	神戸FSC	118.90	19	43.99	19	74.91
19	Hina Takeno	沖学園	117.55	23	41.73	18	75.82
20	Ibuki Sato	明治神宮外苑FSC	113.64	18	44.33	21	69.31
21	Rika Oya	中京大中京高校	111.73	16	45.22	23	66.51
22	Miyu Nishizaka	ﾊﾟﾋﾟｵﾌｨｷﾞｭｱｸﾗﾌﾞ	111.45	20	43.87	22	67.58
23	Hina Yamanaka	広島スケートクラブ	111.20	24	41.61	20	69.59
24	Fuka Shimizu	オリオンFSC	102.65	22	42.47	24	60.18
Did not advance to free skating
25	Ayane Yokoi	大同大大同SC		25	41.37	—	
26	Yuhana Yokoi	邦和スポーツランド		26	41.27	—	
27	Yuna Shiraiwa	京都醍醐FSC		27	40.07	—	
28	Moene Kasai	山梨学院大学附属高校		28	39.33	—	
29	Momoka Sumi	グランプリ東海クラブ		29	39.12	—	
30	Rinka Watanabe	西武東伏見FSC		30	38.83	—	
31	Reia Funasako	ｱｸｱﾘﾝｸちばクラブ		31	34.87	—	
32	Reimi Tsuboi	邦和SC		32	34.41	—	

=== Pairs ===
Rank	Name	Club	Total points	SP		FS	
1	Ami Koga / Francis Boudreau-Audet	オリオンFSC	127.26	1	42.30	1	84.96

=== Ice dancing ===
Rank	Name	Club	Total points	SD		FD	
1	Rikako Fukase / Aru Tateno	川越FSC / 明治神宮外苑FSC	85.94	1	34.26	1	51.68
2	Ayumi Takanami / Daiki Shimazaki	ｱｸｱﾘﾝｸちばクラブ / 新横浜プリンスFSC	51.30	2	22.16	2	29.14

== International team selections ==
=== World Championships ===
The World Championship team was announced as follows:

	Men	Ladies	Pairs	Ice dancing
1	Yuzuru Hanyu	Satoko Miyahara	Narumi Takahashi / Ryuichi Kihara	Cathy Reed/Chris Reed
2	Takahiko Kozuka	Rika Hongo	—	
3	~~Tatsuki Machida~~^{[WD]} Takahito Mura	Kanako Murakami	—	

- ^{WD} Takahito Mura replaced Tatsuki Machida due to Machida's retirement.

=== Four Continents Championships ===
The Four Continents Championship team was announced as follows:

	Men	Ladies	Pairs	Ice dancing
1	Shoma Uno	Satoko Miyahara	Narumi Takahashi / Ryuichi Kihara	Cathy Reed / Chris Reed
2	Takahito Mura	Rika Hongo	—	Emi Hirai / Marien de la Asuncion
3	Daisuke Murakami	Yuka Nagai	—	

=== World Junior Championships ===
The World Junior Championship team was announced as follows:

	Men	Ladies	Pairs
1	Shoma Uno	Wakaba Higuchi	Ami Koga / Francis Boudreau-Audet
2	Sota Yamamoto	Yuka Nagai	—
3	Hiroaki Sato	Kaori Sakamoto	—
