= Rika Hongo =

Japanese figure skater (born 1996)

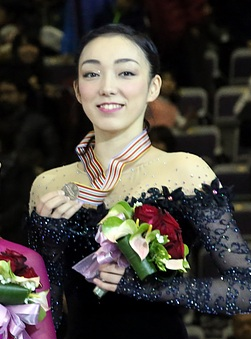
- Hongo in 2016

Personal information
- Native name: 本郷 理華
- Born: September 6, 1996 (age 30) Sendai, Japan
- Home town: Nagoya
- Height: 1.66 m (5 ft 5 1/2 in)

Figure skating career
- Country: Japan
- Skating club: Howa Sports Land Skating Club
- Began skating: 2001
- Retired: June 15, 2021
Four Continents Championships
Bronze medal – third place	2015 Seoul	Singles
Bronze medal – third place	2016 Taipei	Singles
Japan Championships
Silver medal – second place	2014–15 Nagano	Singles

Rika Hongo (Japanese: 本郷理華; born September 6, 1996) is a Japanese retired competitive figure skater who is a two-time (2015–16) Four Continents bronze medalist, 2014 Rostelecom Cup champion, 2015 Finlandia Trophy champion and 2014–15 Japanese national silver medalist.

== Personal life ==
Rika Hongo was born on September 6, 1996, in Sendai, Japan. Her mother, Yuko, is a former figure skater. Her father is from the United Kingdom. In 2015, Hongo attended Chukyo University.

== Career ==
=== Early years ===
Hongo began skating in 2001. She moved to Nagoya at age nine to train under coach Hiroshi Nagakubo. Shizuka Arakawa was named as an influence in a 2006 report.

=== 2012–2013 season ===
Hongo debuted on the ISU Junior Grand Prix series in the 2012–13 season. She won a silver medal in Courchevel, France and placed fifth in Croatia. Along with Satoko Miyahara, she was selected to represent Japan at the 2013 World Junior Championships in Milan, Italy. Hongo placed seventh in the short program, tenth in the free skate, and finished ninth overall.

=== 2013–2014 season ===
Hongo started the 2013–14 season with a fourth-place finish at JGP Mexico and then won a bronze medal at JGP Belarus. At the 2014 World Junior Championships in Sofia, Bulgaria, she placed eleventh in the short program, seventh in the free skate, and eighth overall. Making her senior international debut, Hongo won gold at the 2014 Triglav Trophy, her final event of the season.

=== 2014–2015 season ===
Hongo began the 2014–15 season with gold at the Asian Open and then bronze at the 2014 Finlandia Trophy, an ISU Challenger Series event. Making her senior Grand Prix debut, she finished fifth at the 2014 Skate Canada International after placing fifth in the short program and free skate. At her second Grand Prix event, the 2014 Rostelecom Cup, Hongo won the gold medal ahead of Russia's Anna Pogorilaya by 4.57 points after placing second in the short program and winning the free skate. Hongo was first alternate to the Grand Prix Final and was later called on to compete after qualifier Gracie Gold withdrew with a foot injury. She finished sixth overall after placing fifth in the short and free programs.

At the Japan Championships, Hongo won the short program and placed second in the free skate, winning the silver medal behind Satoko Miyahara and earning her first medal at Japanese Nationals. At the 2015 Four Continents, she placed third in the short and long programs, capturing the bronze medal behind gold medalist Polina Edmunds and silver medalist Miyahara.

Hongo made her senior worlds debut at the 2015 World Championships in Shanghai, where she earned personal bests in all segments of the competition. She finished sixth overall after placing fifth in both segments.

=== 2015–2016 season ===
Hongo began her season by winning both segments in a domestic competition called the Summer Cup, held in Shiga prefecture, Japan. Two months later, she outscored Yulia Lipnitskaya by 15.12 points to win gold at a Challenger Series event, the 2015 CS Finlandia Trophy, where she obtained a personal best total score of 187.45 points. Hongo then won silver at 2015 Cup of China, but placed fifth at 2015 Rostelecom Cup, and as a result, did not qualify for the Grand Prix Final. She placed 4th at the Japan Championships.

Ranked 4th in the short and 5th in the free, Hongo came away with the bronze medal at the 2016 Four Continents in Taipei, behind Satoko Miyahara and Mirai Nagasu. She finished 8th at the 2016 World Championships in Boston.

=== 2016–2017 season ===
Hongo finished 4th at the 2016 CS Autumn Classic International and 6th at her first GP event of the season, 2016 Skate Canada International. She placed 5th at both of her December competitions, the 2016 Cup of China and the Japan Figure Skating Championships.

Hongo replaced the injured Satoko Miyahara at the 2017 Four Continents Championships, finishing 10th.

=== 2017–2018 season ===
Hongo began her season with a silver medal at the 2017 CS Ondrej Nepela Trophy.

=== 2019–2020 season ===
Hongo decided to take a hiatus from skating, despite having had a new “Ghost in the Shell”-themed free skate choreographed for her by Shae-Lynn Bourne in May 2019. It was unknown whether she would return to competitive skating.

=== 2020–2021 season ===
Hongo competed at the Chubu Regionals, a qualifier for the 2020–21 Japan Championships and placed second behind Mako Yamashita and ahead of Rin Nitaya. She finished first in the free skate. She later placed eighteenth at the Japan Championships.

Hongo announced her retirement from competitive skating on June 15, 2021.

=== Post-competitive career ===
In the spring of 2023, Hongo was cast to play Bon Clay in the summer show, One Piece on Ice.

== Programs ==
Season	Short program	Free skating	Exhibition
2020–2021	The Song of My Brother (from Crash Landing on You) choreo. by Yuko Hongo	Reawakening from (Ghost in the Shell) by Kenji Kawai choreo. by Shae-Lynn Bourne	
2019–2020	Did not compete in this season		
2018–2019	Battle Without Honor or Humanity by Tomoyasu Hotei choreo. by Shae-Lynn Bourne	Child of Nazareth by Maxime Rodriguez choreo. by Kenji Miyamoto	
2017–2018	Carmina Burana by Carl Orff choreo. by Shae-Lynn Bourne	Frida by Elliot Goldenthal choreo. by Shae-Lynn Bourne	Blackpink medley choreo. by Misha Ge
2016–2017	Carmina Burana by Carl Orff choreo. by Shae-Lynn Bourne	Reel Around The Sun by Bill Whelan choreo. by Kenji Miyamoto; Lawrence of Arabia by Maurice Jarre choreo. by Akiko Suzuki	The Sky and the Dawn and the Sun by Celtic Woman
2015–2016	Incantation (from Quidam) by Benoît Jutras choreo. by Akiko Suzuki	Reel Around The Sun by Bill Whelan choreo. by Kenji Miyamoto	Let's Get Loud by Jennifer Lopez
2014–2015	Le Corsaire by Adolphe Adam, Ludwig Minkus choreo. by Kenji Miyamoto	Carmen by Georges Bizet choreo. by Kenji Miyamoto	Let's Get Loud by Jennifer Lopez; Thriller by Michael Jackson; Don Quixote by Ludwig Minkus
2013–2014	Don Quixote by Ludwig Minkus	Miss Saigon by Claude-Michel Schönberg	Yozakura Oshichi by Fukumi Sakamoto
2012–2013	Samson and Delilah by Camille Saint-Saëns	Swan Lake by Pyotr Tchaikovsky	Don Quixote by Ludwig Minkus

== Competitive highlights ==
GP: Grand Prix; CS: Challenger Series; JGP: Junior Grand Prix

International
Event	10–11	12–13	13–14	14–15	15–16	16–17	17–18	18–19	20–21
Worlds				6th	8th	16th			
Four Continents				3rd	3rd	10th			
GP Final				6th					
GP Cup of China					2nd	5th			
GP Finland								10th	
GP NHK Trophy							7th		
GP Rostelecom				1st	5th				
GP Skate Canada				5th		6th	6th		
CS Autumn Classic						4th			
CS Finlandia				3rd	1st			16th	
CS Ondrej Nepela							2nd		
Asian Games						4th			
Asian Open				1st					
Challenge Cup							2nd		
Printemps						1st			
Triglav Trophy			1st						
International: Junior
Junior Worlds		9th	8th						
JGP Belarus			3rd						
JGP Croatia		5th							
JGP France		2nd							
JGP Mexico			4th						
National
Japan		5th	6th	2nd	4th	5th	6th	17th	18th
Japan Junior	19th	3rd	1st						
Team events
Team Challenge Cup					3rd T 7th P				

== Detailed results ==
=== Senior level ===
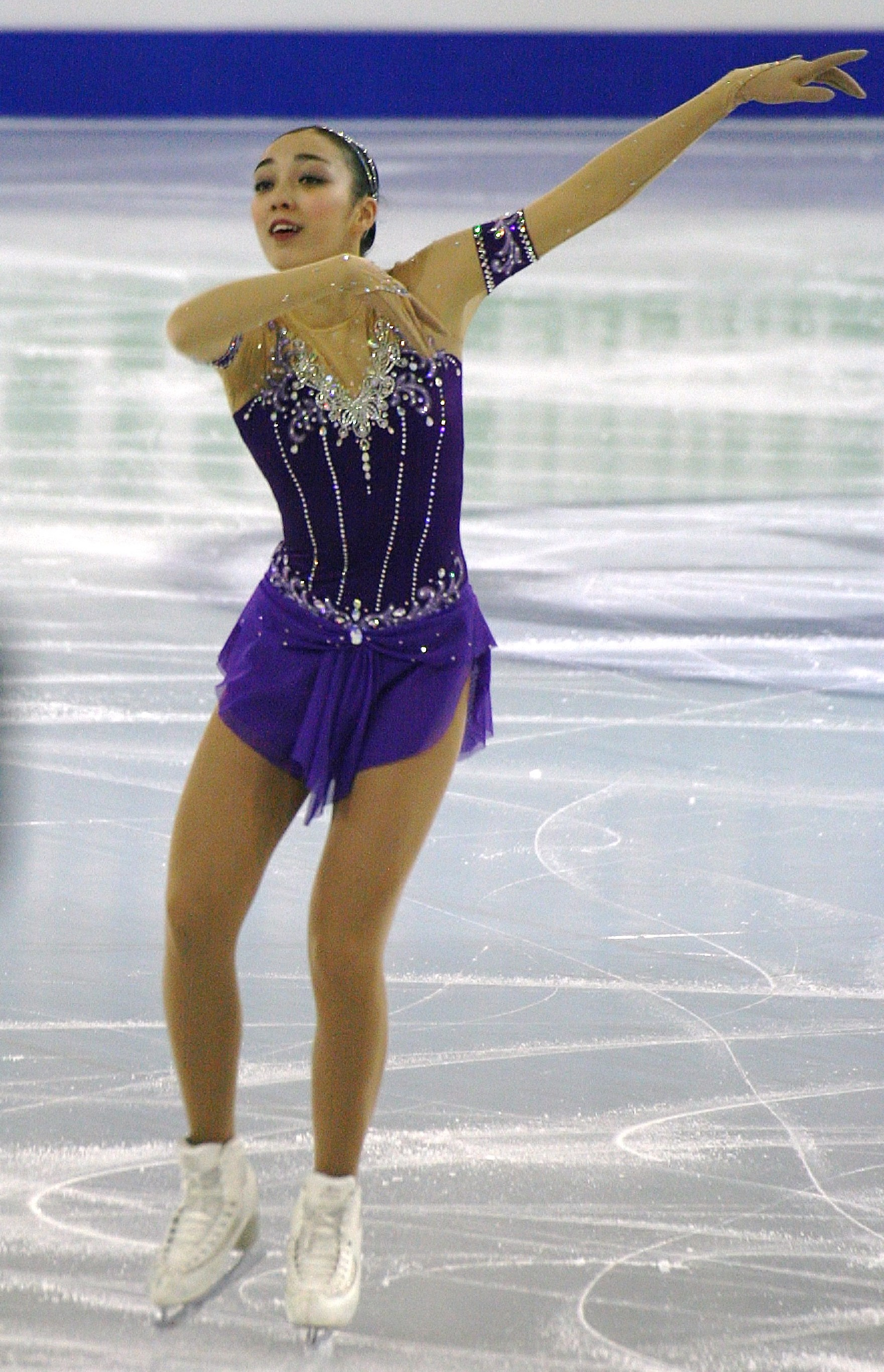
Hongo at the 2014–15 Grand Prix Final

Small medals for short program and free skating awarded only at ISU Championships. At team events, medals awarded for team results only.

2020–21 season
Date	Event	SP	FS	Total
December 24–27, 2020	2020–21 Japan Championships	17; 59.05	19; 101.80	18; 160.85
2018–19 season
Date	Event	SP	FS	Total
December 21–23, 2018	2018–19 Japan Championships	17; 55.93	16; 107.25	17; 163.18
November 2–4, 2018	2018 Grand Prix of Helsinki	11; 51.11	7; 105.48	10; 156.59
October 4–7, 2018	2018 CS Finlandia Trophy	15; 46.54	16; 87.12	16; 133.66
2017–18 season
Date	Event	SP	FS	Total
February 22–25, 2018	2018 Challenge Cup	2; 62.07	3; 106.72	2; 168.79
December 21–24, 2017	2017–18 Japan Championships	3; 70.48	8; 127.14	6; 197.62
November 10–12, 2017	2017 NHK Trophy	4; 65.83	7; 122.00	7; 187.83
October 27–29, 2017	2017 Skate Canada International	6; 61.60	6; 114.74	6; 176.34
September 21–23, 2017	2017 CS Ondrej Nepela Trophy	2; 66.49	2; 123.49	2; 189.98
2016–17 season
Date	Event	SP	FS	Total
Mar. 29 – Apr. 2, 2017	2017 World Championships	12; 62.55	18; 107.28	16; 169.83
March 10–12, 2017	2017 Coupe du Printemps	1; 59.27	1; 103.29	1; 162.56
February 23–26, 2017	2017 Asian Winter Games	2; 60.98	4; 100.39	4; 161.37
February 15–19, 2017	2017 Four Continents Championships	9; 59.16	13; 108.26	10; 167.42
December 22–25, 2016	2016–17 Japan Championships	2; 69.20	6; 125.08	5; 194.28
November 18–20, 2016	2016 Cup of China	6; 63.63	6; 118.12	5; 181.75
October 28–30, 2016	2016 Skate Canada International	4; 65.75	8; 105.44	6; 171.19
Sept. 29 – Oct. 1, 2016	2016 CS Autumn Classic International	4; 60.33	4; 110.01	4; 170.34
2015–16 season
Date	Event	SP	FS	Total
Mar. 28 – Apr. 3, 2016	2016 World Championships	7; 69.89	8; 129.26	8; 199.15
February 16–21, 2016	2016 Four Continents Championships	4; 64.27	5; 117.51	3; 181.78
December 24–27, 2015	2015–16 Japan Championships	2; 68.39	4; 124.89	4; 193.28
November 20–22, 2015	2015 Rostelecom Cup	6; 63.45	5; 115.67	5; 179.12
November 6–8, 2015	2015 Cup of China	2; 65.79	1; 129.97	2; 195.76
October 9–11, 2015	2015 CS Finlandia Trophy	1; 65.75	1; 121.70	1; 187.45
2014–15 season
Date	Event	SP	FS	Total
March 23–29, 2015	2015 World Championships	5; 62.17	5; 122.41	6; 184.58
February 15–19, 2015	2015 Four Continents Championships	3; 61.28	3; 116.16	3; 177.44
December 26–28, 2014	2014–15 Japan Championships	1; 66.70	2; 121.93	2; 188.63
December 11–14, 2014	2014–15 Grand Prix Final	5; 61.10	5; 115.03	6; 176.13
November 14–16, 2014	2014 Rostelecom Cup	2; 59.85	1; 118.15	1; 178.00
Oct. 31 – Nov. 2, 2014	2014 Skate Canada International	5; 59.10	5; 112.37	5; 171.47
October 9–12, 2014	2014 CS Finlandia Trophy	3; 52.11	3; 101.60	3; 153.71
August 7–10, 2014	2014 Asian Trophy	1; 57.91	2; 110.98	1; 168.89

=== Junior level ===
2013–14 season
Date	Event	Level	SP	FS	Total
April 2–6, 2014	2014 Triglav Trophy	Senior	1; 57.71	1; 95.61	1; 153.32
March 10–16, 2014	2014 World Junior Championships	Junior	11; 51.47	7; 106.41	8; 157.88
December 20–23, 2013	2013–14 Japan Championships	Senior	7; 59.25	6; 117.06	6; 176.31
November 22–24, 2013	2013–14 Japan Junior Championships	Junior	3; 52.84	1; 110.28	1; 162.12
September 25–28, 2013	2013 Junior Grand Prix Belarus	Junior	5; 50.10	5; 94.87	3; 144.97
September 4–7, 2013	2013 Junior Grand Prix Mexico	Junior	6; 48.09	3; 99.48	4; 147.57
2012–13 season
Date	Event	Level	SP	FS	Total
Feb. 25 – Mar. 3, 2013	2013 World Junior Championships	Junior	7; 52.15	10; 90.47	9; 142.62
December 20–24, 2012	2012–13 Japan Championships	Senior	6; 56.61	4; 115.82	5; 172.43
November 17–18, 2012	2012–13 Japan Junior Championships	Junior	3; 55.47	3; 103.87	3; 159.34
October 22–25, 2012	2012 JGP France	Junior	3; 53.16	2; 96.22	2; 149.38
October 3–6, 2012	2012 JGP Croatia	Junior	6; 45.93	4; 95.04	5; 140.97
2010–11 season
Date	Event	Level	SP	FS	Total
November 26–28, 2010	Japan Junior Championships	Junior			19
