= 2015–16 Japan Figure Skating Championships =

Figure skating competition

- Type: National championship
- Date: December 24–27, 2015 (S); November 21–23, 2015 (J)
- Season: 2015–16
- Location: Sapporo, Hokkaido (S); Hitachinaka, Ibaraki (J)
- Venue: Makomanai Sekisui Heim Ice Arena (S)

Champions
- Men's singles: Yuzuru Hanyu (S); Sota Yamamoto (J)
- Ladies' singles: Satoko Miyahara (S); Wakaba Higuchi (J)
- Pairs: Sumire Suto / Francis Boudreau Audet (S); Riku Miura / Shoya Ichihashi (J)
- Ice dance: Kana Muramoto / Chris Reed (S); Rikako Fukase / Aru Tateno (J)
- Previous: 2014–15 Japan Championships
- Next: 2016–17 Japan Championships

The 2015–16 Japan Figure Skating Championships was held on December 24–27, 2015 at the Makomanai Sekisui Heim Ice Arena in Sapporo. It was the 84th edition of the event. Medals were awarded in the disciplines of men's singles, ladies' singles, pair skating, and ice dancing.

== Results ==
=== Men ===
Rank	Name	Club	Total points	SP		FS	
1	Yuzuru Hanyu	All-Nippon Airways / ANA	286.36	1	102.63	1	183.73
2	Shoma Uno	Chukyo University High School / 中京大中京高校	267.15	2	97.94	3	169.21
3	Takahito Mura	HIROTA	263.46	3	93.26	2	170.20
4	Keiji Tanaka	Kurashiki Univ. of Science and Arts / 倉敷芸術科学大学	242.05	6	74.19	4	167.86
5	Takahiko Kozuka	Toyota Cars / トヨタ自動車	228.82	5	78.19	6	150.63
6	Sota Yamamoto	Aichi Mizuho University High School / 愛知みずほ大瑞穂高校	215.15	11	62.92	5	152.23
7	Daisuke Murakami	Yoshindo / 陽進堂	214.56	4	83.49	8	131.07
8	Ryuju Hino	Chukyo University / 中京大学	213.17	7	74.03	7	139.14
9	Shu Nakamura	Kansai University / 関西大学	194.84	8	69.47	11	125.37
10	Daichi Miyata	Hosei University / 法政大学	193.17	10	66.61	10	126.56
11	Koshiro Shimada	Shujitsu High School / 就実学園	188.76	17	58.41	9	130.35
12	Sei Kawahara	Fukuoka University / 福岡大学	188.39	9	66.72	13	121.67
13	Jun Suzuki	Hokkaido University / 北海道大学	185.18	14	61.82	12	123.36
14	Mitsuki Sumoto	Ueno Shiba Skating Club / 上野芝スケートクラブ	176.32	18	58.11	14	118.21
15	Daisuke Isozaki	Doshisha University / 同志社大学F	175.02	19	57.15	15	117.87
16	Kazuki Tomono	Naniwa High School Skating Club / 浪速高校ｽｹｰﾄ部	173.72	12	62.51	17	111.21
17	Eiki Hattori	Hosei University / 法政大学	173.26	13	61.94	16	111.32
18	Hiroaki Sato	Iwate University / 岩手大学	167.92	16	60.03	20	107.89
19	Kohei Yoshino	Kansai University / 関西大学	163.88	20	55.97	19	107.91
20	Koshin Yamada	Sumitomo Mitsui Banking Corporation / SMBC	161.09	23	53.02	18	108.07
21	Naoki Oda	Okayama Univ. of Science High School / 岡山理大附高校	158.95	15	61.21	22	97.74
22	Kosuke Nozoe	Meiji University / 明治大学	156.44	21	54.89	21	101.55
23	Masato Kimura	Hachinohe GOLD Figure Skating Club / 八戸GOLD FSC	150.55	22	53.19	23	97.36
24	Ryuta Katada	Nagoya Institute of Technology / 名古屋工業大学	140.34	24	51.54	24	88.80
Did not advance to free skating
25	Kento Kajita	Meiji University / 明治大学		25	51.42	—	
26	Keiichiro Sasahara	Doshisha University / 同志社大学F		26	51.28	—	
27	Ryo Sagami	Meiji University / 明治大学		27	50.85	—	
28	Ryoichi Yuasa	Kansai University / 関西大学		28	50.69	—	
29	Kosuke Nakano	Iizuka Figure Skating Club / 飯塚フィギュアクラブ		29	50.36	—	
30	Kosuke Watabe	Hosei University / 法政大学		30	49.56	—	

=== Ladies ===
Nakashio withdrew due to injury sustained during practice before the Short Program was held.

Rank	Name	Club	Total points	SP		FS	
1	Satoko Miyahara	Kansai Univ. JHS/HS Skating Club / 関西大学中・高ｽｹｰﾄ部	212.83	1	73.24	1	139.59
2	Wakaba Higuchi	Kaichi Nihonbashi Gakuen JHS/HS / 開智日本橋学園中学校	195.35	3	67.48	3	127.87
3	Mao Asada	Chukyo University / 中京大学	193.75	5	62.03	2	131.72
4	Rika Hongo	Howa Sportsland / 邦和スポーツランド	193.28	2	67.48	4	124.89
5	Yuna Shiraiwa	Kyoto Daigo Figure Skating Club / 京都醍醐 FSC	186.33	6	61.92	5	124.41
6	Kanako Murakami	Chukyo University / 中京大学	181.58	4	66.02	8	115.56
7	Yuka Nagai	Komaba Gakuen High School / 駒場学園高校	178.86	7	60.42	6	118.44
8	Rin Nitaya	Aichi Mizuho University High School / 愛知みずほ大瑞穂高校	178.48	8	60.10	7	118.38
9	Marin Honda	Kansai Univ. JHS/HS Skating Club / 関西大学中・高ｽｹｰﾄ部	171.62	11	58.23	9	113.39
10	Mariko Kihara	Kyoto Daigo Figure Skating Club / 京都醍醐 FSC	170.69	12	58.10	11	112.59
11	Yuhana Yokoi	Howa Sportsland / 邦和スポーツランド	169.40	13	56.30	10	113.10
12	Yura Matsuda	Chukyo University High School / 中京大中京高校	165.84	10	58.76	13	107.08
13	Kaori Sakamoto	Kobe Figure Skating Club / 神戸FSC	165.50	17	53.90	12	111.60
14	Hinano Isobe	Ritsumeikan Uji High School / 立命館宇治高校	161.24	14	55.69	15	105.55
15	Haruka Imai	Niigata Kenren / 新潟県連	161.23	15	55.20	14	106.03
16	Yuna Aoki	Kanagawa Figure Skating Club / 神奈川 FSC	155.84	9	58.96	18	96.88
17	Miyabi Oba	Chukyo University / 中京大学	153.41	22	49.52	16	103.89
18	Yuki Nishino	Meiji University / 明治大学	151.32	21	49.81	17	101.51
19	Saya Ueno	Kansai University / 関西大学	147.06	16	55.05	19	92.01
20	Riona Kato	Nagaodani High School / 長尾谷高校	141.12	19	52.35	20	88.77
21	Haruna Suzuki	Nittai Ebara High School Skating Club / 日体荏原高スケート部	137.28	20	51.49	21	85.79
22	Chinatsu Mori	Aichi Mizuho University High School / 愛知みずほ大瑞穂高校	137.28	24	45.84	22	85.14
23	Uruha Takahashi	Sapporo University / 札幌大学	130.75	18	52.41	24	78.34
24	Kaho Komaki	Shujitsu Gakuen / 就実学園	127.79	23	47.38	23	80.41
Did not advance to free skating
25	Ayana Yasuhara	Kansai University / 関西大学		25	42.96	—	
26	Rika Oya	Chukyo University High School / 中京大中京高校		26	42.78	—	
27	Ayaka Hosoda	Kansai University / 関西大学		27	41.44	—	
28	Mina Taniguchi	Chukyo University High School / 中京大中京高校		28	37.08	—	
29	Ami Dobashi	Hokkai High School / 北海高等学校		29	35.82	—	
WD	Miyu Nakashio	Hiroshima Skating Club / 広島スケートクラブ	withdrew from competition				

=== Pair skating ===
Rank	Name	Club	Total points	SP		FS	
1	Sumire Suto / Francis Boudreau Audet	Kanagawa FSC / 神奈川 FSC	149.55	1	53.31	1	96.24
2	Marin Ono / Wesley Killing	Hyougo Nishinomiya FSC / ひょうご西宮FSC	133.22	2	45.94	2	87.28
3	Miu Suzaki / Ryuichi Kihara	Kinoshita Club / 木下クラブ	126.12	3	43.64	3	82.48

=== Ice dancing ===
Rank	Name	Club	Total points	SP		FS	
1	Kana Muramoto / Chris Reed	Kinoshita Club / 木下クラブ	147.08	1	58.36	1	88.72
2	Emi Hirai / Marien de la Asuncion	Osaka Skating Club / 大阪スケート倶楽部	141.63	2	54.24	2	87.39
3	Ibuki Mori / Kentaro Suzuki	Meito FSC / Papio FC / 名東FSC/ﾊﾟﾋﾟｵﾌｨｷﾞｭｱｸﾗﾌﾞ	110.56	3	43.66	3	66.90
4	Haruno Yajima / Kokoro Mizutani	Shin-Yokohama Prince FSC / 新横浜プリンスFSC	75.82	4	29.79	4	46.03

== Japan Junior Figure Skating Championships ==
The 2015–16 Junior Championships took place on November 21–23, 2015 in Hitachinaka, Ibaraki. Medals were awarded in men's singles, ladies' singles, and ice dancing. There was no junior pairs event during the Junior Championship. The junior pairs event was held during the senior competition on December 24–27, 2015.

=== Men ===
Rank	Name	Club	Total points	SP		FS	
1	Sota Yamamoto	愛知みずほ大瑞穂高校	213.40	1	70.42	1	142.98
2	Kazuki Tomono	浪速高校ｽｹｰﾄ部	183.19	3	63.53	3	119.66
3	Daichi Miyata	法政大学	178.38	4	60.94	4	117.44
4	Koshiro Shimada	就実学園	177.43	8	55.04	2	122.39
5	Shu Nakamura	関西大学	172.83	2	63.78	8	109.05
6	Mitsuki Sumoto	上野芝スケートクラブ	169.87	6	58.82	6	111.05
7	Taichiro Yamakuma	ひょうご西宮FSC	167.99	12	50.68	5	117.31
8	Hidetsuku Kamata	明治大学	163.87	5	58.89	9	104.98
9	Sena Miyake	岡山FSC	162.05	9	52.93	7	109.12
10	Taichi Honda	関西大学中・高ｽｹｰﾄ部	154.67	7	55.98	11	98.69
11	Yuto Kishina	金光学園	151.55	16	47.98	10	103.57
12	Kotaro Tekeuchi	愛知みずほ大瑞穂高校	149.51	10	51.61	13	97.90
13	Kazuki Kushida	岡山理大附高校	146.38	15	48.43	12	97.95
14	Tatsuya Tsuboi	邦和SC	145.58	14	48.89	14	96.69
15	Shun Sato	仙台FSC	143.46	13	50.11	15	93.35
16	Tsunehito Karakawa	新横浜プリンスFSC	141.61	11	51.02	16	90.59
17	Mahu Nishiyama	明治神宮外苑FSC	132.43	18	46.88	20	85.55
18	Kento Kobayashi	秀明英光高校	132.33	19	45.86	18	86.47
19	Kyoren Yakamoto	愛知みずほ大学	130.73	23	44.17	17	86.56
20	Sasaki Haruya	邦和SC	129.07	24	42.98	19	86.09
21	Satoshi Yamafuji	石見スケートクラブ	129.00	21	45.22	21	83.78
22	Rei Takeshi	駒場学園高校	120.19	20	45.57	23	74.62
23	Shion Kamada	札幌第一高校	119.90	22	44.36	22	75.54
24	Shoya Ichihashi	関大北陽スケート部		17	46.98	withdrew	
Did not advance to free skating
25	Hori Yoshito	明治神宮外苑FSC		25	42.60	—	
26	Kazuki Hasegawa	ROYCE'F･S･C		26	39.68	—	
27	Ryu Migaku	北九州FSC		27	39.47	—	
28	Ryoshin Kobayashi	新横浜プリンスFSC		28	36.35	—	
29	Kotaro Hayakawa	ﾊﾟﾋﾟｵﾌｨｷﾞｭｱｸﾗﾌﾞ		29	32.54	—	

=== Ladies ===
Rank	Name	Club	Total points	SP		FS	
1	Wakaba Higuchi	開智日本橋学園中学校	189.23	1	66.83	1	122.40
2	Yuna Shiraiwa	京都醍醐FSC	184.16	2	62.77	2	121.39
3	Yuhana Yokoi	邦和スポーツランド	177.40	4	60.16	3	117.24
4	Rin Nitaya	愛知みずほ大瑞穂高校	175.97	3	61.03	4	114.94
5	Kaori Sakamoto	神戸FSC	170.72	5	58.96	6	111.76
6	Marin Honda	関西大学中・高ｽｹｰﾄ部	168.88	7	54.65	5	114.23
7	Yuna Aoki	神奈川FSC	162.47	10	52.96	8	109.51
8	Mai Mihara	神戸PFSC	160.12	15	49.08	7	111.04
9	Mako Yamashita	グランプリ東海クラブ	159.21	12	51.40	9	107.81
10	Kokoro Iwamoto	大阪スケート倶楽部	154.98	6	55.53	10	99.45
11	Rika Kihira	大阪スケート倶楽部	142.91	8	53.38	15	89.53
12	Nana Araki	名東FSC	141.89	11	51.83	14	90.06
13	Rinka Watanabe	文華女子中高	140.90	9	53.35	17	87.55
14	Rino Kasakake	ポラリス中部FSC	139.25	18	47.04	12	92.31
15	Sui Takeuchi	オリオンFSC	139.25	21	45.05	11	94.20
16	Sumi Kihana	グランプリ東海クラブ	138.39	13	50.07	16	88.32
17	Riko Takino	大阪スケート倶楽部	137.82	19	46.47	13	91.35
18	Emiri Nagata	中京大中京高校	131.48	20	45.18	18	86.30
19	Moa Iwano	神戸PFSC	130.06	17	47.19	19	82.87
20	Hina Takeno	沖学園	129.84	16	47.49	20	82.35
21	Ayane Yokoi	大同大大同SC	126.97	14	49.75	22	77.22
22	Ozawa Minamoto	甲府FSC	124.33	22	44.94	21	79.39
23	Kiyoshiyo Kobayashi	伊勢崎クラブ	120.56	23	44.51	23	76.05
24	Misaki Morishita	ｱｸｱﾋﾟｱｽｹｰﾃｨﾝｸﾞC	120.43	24	44.47	24	75.96
Did not advance to free skating
25	Akari Matsuraba	武蔵野学院		25	44.23	—	
26	Saya Suzuki	邦和SC		26	44.17	—	
27	Tomoe Kawabata	シチズンクラブ		27	44.17	—	
28	Harua Baba	明治神宮外苑FSC		28	43.33	—	
29	Dayang Osawa	三沢GOLD F・S・C		29	40.47	—	
30	Mizuho Higuchi	開智日本橋学園中学校		30	38.23	—	

=== Pairs ===
Rank	Name	Club	Total points	SP		FS	
1	Riku Miura / Shoya Ichihashi	大阪スケート倶楽部 / 関大北陽スケート部	107.50	1	37.11	1	70.39
2	Yoshino Sekiguchi / Shunsuke Sekiguchi	白鵬女子高校 / 武相高校スケート部	69.95	2	22.75	2	47.20

=== Ice dancing ===
Rank	Name	Club	Total points	SP		FS	
1	Rikako Fukase / Aru Tateno	霞ヶ関高校 / 明治神宮外苑FSC	120.10	1	47.71	1	72.39
2	Kumiko Maeda / Junya Watanabe	明治神宮外苑FSC / 浪速高校ｽｹｰﾄ部	99.62	2	44.36	2	55.26
3	Himesato Hirayama / Kenta Azuma	倉敷FSC / 倉敷FSC	79.99	3	34.50	3	45.49
4	Ayumi Takanami / Daiki Shimazaki	ｱｸｱﾘﾝｸちばクラブ / 新横浜プリンスFSC	68.51	4	24.66	4	43.85

== International team selections ==
Based on the results of the National Championships, as well as international ISU-sanctioned competitions, the Japan Skating Federation selected the following skaters for international competitions in the second half of the 2015–16 season.

=== World Championships ===
	Men	Ladies	Pairs	Ice dancing
1	Yuzuru Hanyu	Satoko Miyahara	Sumire Suto / Francis Boudreau Audet	Kana Muramoto / Chris Reed
2	Shoma Uno	Mao Asada		
3		Rika Hongo		
1st alt.	Takahito Mura	Kanako Murakami		
2nd alt.	Daisuke Murakami	Yuka Nagai		

=== Four Continents Championships ===
	Men	Ladies	Pairs	Ice dancing
1	Shoma Uno	Satoko Miyahara	Sumire Suto / Francis Boudreau Audet	Kana Muramoto / Chris Reed
2	Takahito Mura	Mao Asada (withdrew)		Emi Hirai / Marien de la Asuncion
3	Keiji Tanaka	Rika Hongo		
1st alt.	Daisuke Murakami	Kanako Murakami (added)		
2nd alt.	Takahiko Kozuka	Yuka Nagai		

=== World Junior Championships ===
	Men	Ladies	Pairs	Ice dancing
1	Sota Yamamoto	Wakaba Higuchi	N/A	Rikako Fukase / Aru Tateno
2	Shu Nakamura	Yuna Shiraiwa		
3	Daichi Miyata	Marin Honda		
1st alt.	Kazuki Tomono	Yuhana Yokoi		

=== Winter Youth Olympics ===
	Men	Ladies
1	Sota Yamamoto	Yuna Shiraiwa
2	Koshiro Shimada	Kaori Sakamoto
