= Bernauer =

Bernauer is a surname. Notable people with the surname include:

- Agnes Bernauer (1410–1435), the commoner wife of Albert III, Duke of Bavaria
- Anna Bernauer (born 1986), Luxembourgish figure skater who competed for her entire career for Luxembourg
- David Bernauer, the former chairman and CEO of the pharmacy chain Walgreens
- Rudolf Bernauer (1880–1953), Austrian lyricist, librettist, screenwriter, film director, producer, and actor
- Vanessa Bernauer (born 1988), Swiss football midfielder

== See also ==
- Bernauer Straße, street of Berlin between Gesundbrunnen and Mitte
- Bernauer Strasse (Berlin U-Bahn), Berlin U-Bahn station located on the U8
