= Takahito Mura =

Japanese figure skater

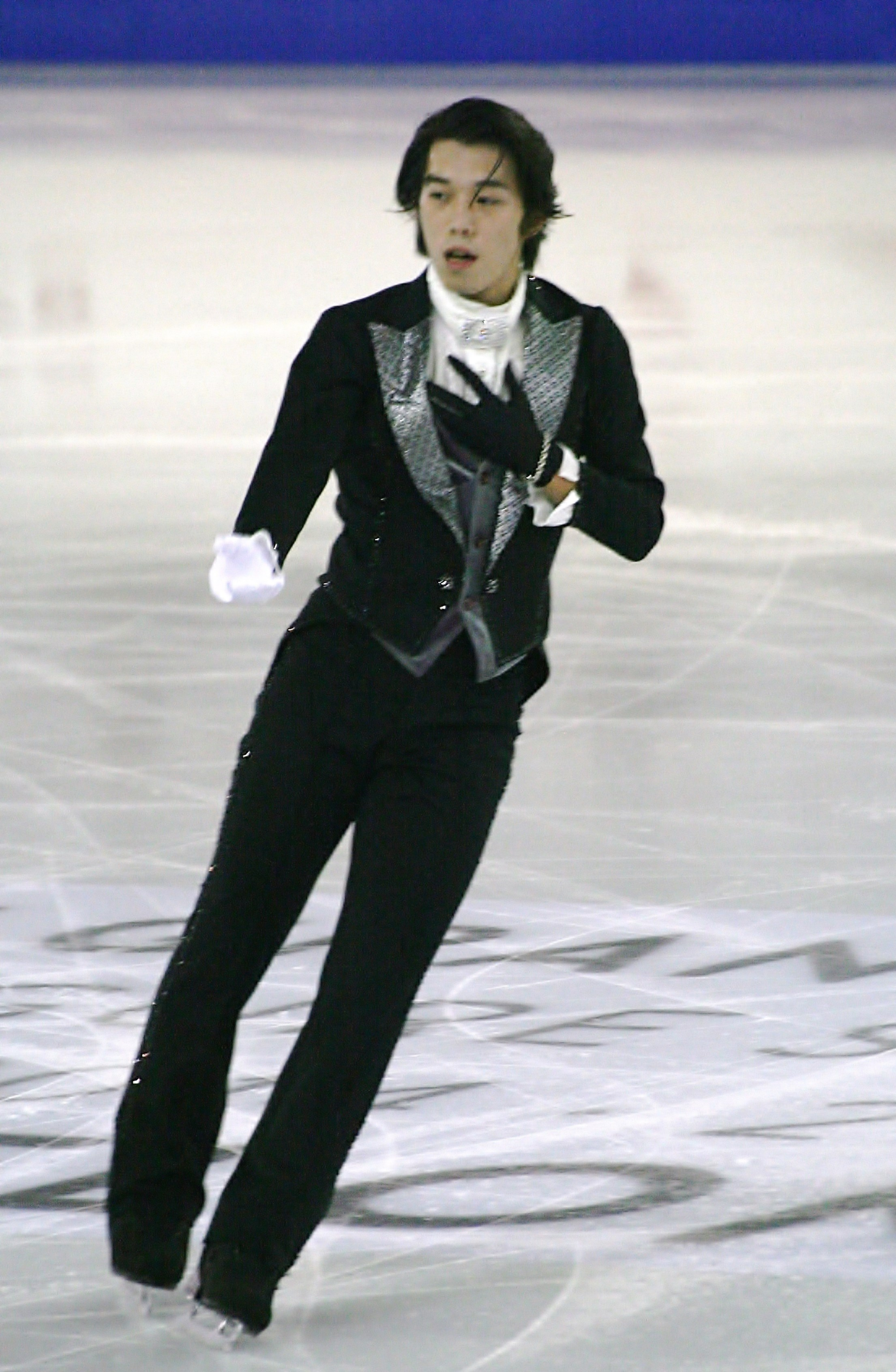
- Mura at the 2014–15 Grand Prix Final

Personal information
- Born: February 11, 1991 (age 35) Matsudo, Chiba, Japan
- Home town: Nagoya
- Height: 1.70 m (5 ft 7 in)

Figure skating career
- Country: Japan
- Coach: Takashi Mura, Chie Mura
- Skating club: Hirota SC
- Began skating: 1994
- Retired: March 16, 2018

Medal record
Four Continents Championships
| Gold medal – first place | 2014 Taipei | Singles |
Japan Championships
| Bronze medal – third place | 2008–09 Nagano | Singles |
| Bronze medal – third place | 2012–13 Sapporo | Singles |
| Bronze medal – third place | 2015–16 Sapporo | Singles |
| Bronze medal – third place | 2016–17 Osaka | Singles |
| Bronze medal – third place | 2017–18 Tokyo | Singles |
World Team Trophy
| Bronze medal – third place | 2013 Tokyo | Team |
| Bronze medal – third place | 2015 Tokyo | Team |

Japanese name
- Kanji: 無良崇人
- Kana: むら たかひと
Transcriptions
- Romanization: Mura Takahito

Takahito Mura (無良 崇人, Mura Takahito; born February 11, 1991) is a Japanese former competitive figure skater. He is the 2014 Four Continents champion, 2014 Skate Canada International champion, and 2012 Trophée Éric Bompard champion. Nationally, he is a five-time Japan Championships bronze medalist and 2007 Japan Junior champion.

== Personal life ==
Takahito Mura was born in Matsudo, Chiba, Japan. His father, Takashi, competed internationally in both singles and pairs, and his mother also competed in figure skating. In 2013, he married his wife and had a daughter, Kanna.

== Career ==
Mura placed fifth at the 2006 World Junior Championships. He won two medals on the Junior Grand Prix circuit in 2006 and qualified for the Junior Grand Prix Final, where he placed just off the podium. He made his senior international debut at the 2008 Finlandia Trophy, which he won.

Mura won his first senior Grand Prix medal, gold, at the 2012 Trophée Éric Bompard. In the 2013-14 season, he was assigned to the 2013 Skate Canada and 2013 NHK Trophy. He placed tenth and sixth at his events. Mura finished sixth at the Japanese Nationals and was assigned to the 2014 Four Continents Championships where he won the gold.

In the 2014–15 season, Mura took silver at an ISU Challenger Series event, the Lombardia Trophy, before winning gold at his first GP assignment of the season, the 2014 Skate Canada International. His next assignment was the 2014 NHK Trophy, where he placed third overall, qualifying for the 2014–15 Grand Prix of Figure Skating Final, in Barcelona, Spain.

At the Grand Prix Final, Mura finished last in the short program and fourth in the free skate, ending fifth overall. He competed in the 2014–15 Japan Figure Skating Championships, where he finished 5th. When Tatsuki Machida retired from figure skating, Mura was named as his replacement to represent Japan at the 2015 World Figure Skating Championships, along with Yuzuru Hanyu and Takahiko Kozuka. He was also selected to represent Japan at the 2015 Four Continents Figure Skating Championships, where he finished seventh. At the World Championships, Mura finished in 16th place.

== Post-competitive career ==
In October 2024 Mura joined forces with Olympic champion Shizuka Arakawa, Olympic bronze medalist Daisuke Takahashi, Kana Muramoto, Kazuki Tomono, Keiji Tanaka, Yuna Aoki, Kosho Oshima, Yuto Kishina and Rena Uezono to launch the members-only official fan community F-Ske on the platform FANICON.

== Programs ==
| Season | Short program | Free skating | Exhibition |
|---|---|---|---|
| 2017–18 | Farrucas - Zapateado (Flamenco); Too Close by Alex Clare choreo. by Massimo Scali | The Phantom of the Opera (different music cut from the 2014-15 season) by Andrew Lloyd Webber choreo. by Charlie White | Farrucas - Zapateado (Flamenco); Evermore from Beauty and the Beast by Alan Menken performed by Josh Groban |
| 2016–17 | Zapateado (flamenco) | Piano Concerto No. 2 by Sergei Rachmaninoff | The Lady Is a Tramp by Tony Bennett and Lady Gaga |
| 2015–16 | Dark Eyes choreo. by Charlie White | O (from Cirque du Soleil) by Benoît Jutras choreo. by Jeffrey Buttle | Feeling Good performed by Michael Bublé |
| 2014–15 | Carmen by Georges Bizet; Violin Concerto by Felix Mendelssohn | The Phantom of the Opera by Andrew Lloyd Webber | Love Never Dies by Andrew Lloyd Webber; Feeling Good performed by Michael Bublé |
| 2013–14 | Minnie the Moocher by Cab Calloway; Jumpin' Jack by Big Bad Voodoo Daddy | Shōgun by Maurice Jarre; Spartacus by Joseph LoDuca | Love Never Dies by Andrew Lloyd Webber |
| 2012–13 | Malagueña by Ernesto Lecuona | Shōgun by Maurice Jarre | Talking to the Moon by Bruno Mars |
| 2011–12 | Red Violin (Concierto de Aranjuez) by Ikuko Kawai | Primavera Porteña by Astor Piazzolla | Neutron Star Collision by Muse |
| 2010–11 | La califfa by Ennio Morricone | Slow Dancing in the Big City | |
| 2009–10 | Für Elise by Ludwig van Beethoven performed by Josh Vietti | Gettysburg by Randy Edelman | |
| 2008–09 | The Feeling Begins by Peter Gabriel | Kojiki by Kitarō | |
| 2007–08 | Art on Ice by Edvin Marton | Violin Concerto by Pyotr Ilyich Tchaikovsky; Emperor Concerto by Ludwig van Beethoven | Mas que nada by Sérgio Mendes |
| 2006–07 | Art on Ice by Edvin Marton | KA by René Dupéré | |
| 2005–06 | Sabre Dance by Aram Khachaturian | Violin Concerto | |

== Competitive highlights ==
GP: Grand Prix; CS: Challenger Series; JGP: Junior Grand Prix

International
| Event | 02–03 | 03–04 | 04–05 | 05–06 | 06–07 | 07–08 | 08–09 | 09–10 | 10–11 | 11–12 | 12–13 | 13–14 | 14–15 | 15–16 | 16–17 | 17–18 |
|---|---|---|---|---|---|---|---|---|---|---|---|---|---|---|---|---|
| Worlds | | | | | | | 15th | | | | 8th | | 16th | | | |
| Four Continents | | | | | | | | | | 5th | 8th | 1st | 7th | 5th | | 12th |
| GP Final | | | | | | | | | | | | | 5th | | | |
| GP Bompard | | | | | | | | | | | 1st | | | | 5th | |
| GP NHK Trophy | | | | | | | 5th | | 6th | | | 6th | 3rd | 3rd | | |
| GP Skate America | | | | | | | | | | | | | | 10th | | 7th |
| GP Skate Canada | | | | | | | | | | | 8th | 10th | 1st | | 8th | 12th |
| CS Lombardia | | | | | | | | | | | | | 2nd | | | |
| CS U.S. Classic | | | | | | | | | | | | | | | 2nd | 7th |
| Asian Games | | | | | | | | | 2nd | | | | | | 4th | |
| Challenge Cup | | | | | | | | | | | | 1st | | | | |
| Finlandia Trophy | | | | | | | 1st | | | 1st | | | | | | |
| Merano Cup | | | | | | | | | 1st | | | | | | | |
| Nepela Trophy | | | | | | | | | | | | 2nd | | WD | | |
| NRW Trophy | | | | | | | | | | 4th | | | | | | |
| Printemps | | | | | | | | | | | | | | 3rd | 2nd | |
| Triglav Trophy | | | | | | | | 1st | | | | | | | | |
International: Junior
| Junior Worlds | | | | 5th | 8th | 19th | | | | | | | | | | |
| JGP Final | | | | | 4th | | | | | | | | | | | |
| JGP Germany | | | | | | 3rd | | | | | | | | | | |
| JGP Hungary | | | | | 2nd | | | | | | | | | | | |
| JGP Poland | | | | 8th | | | | | | | | | | | | |
| JGP Romania | | | | | | 3rd | | | | | | | | | | |
| JGP Slovakia | | | | 5th | | | | | | | | | | | | |
| JGP Taiwan | | | | | 3rd | | | | | | | | | | | |
National
| Japan Champ. | | | | 8th | 8th | 5th | 3rd | 10th | 5th | 5th | 3rd | 6th | 5th | 3rd | 3rd | 3rd |
| Japan Junior | 18th | 13th | 12th | 2nd | 2nd | 1st | | | | | | | | | | |
Team events
| World Team; Trophy | | | | | | | | | | | 3rd T 5th P | | 3rd T 4th P | | | |
