= Koshiro Shimada =

Japanese figure skater

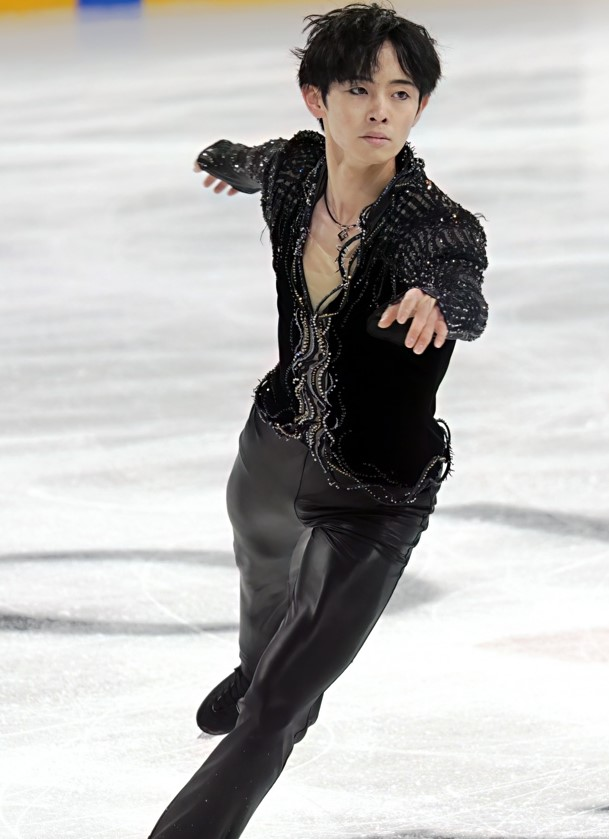
- Koshiro Shimada at the 2024 Grand Prix de France

Personal information
- Native name: 島田 高志郎
- Born: September 11, 2001 (age 25) Matsuyama, Japan
- Height: 1.76 m (5 ft 9 1/2 in)

Figure skating career
- Country: Japan
- Discipline: Ice dance (since 2025); Men's singles (until 2025)
- Partner: Ikura Kushida (since 2025)
- Coach: Cathy Reed
- Skating club: Kinoshita Group
- Began skating: 2008

Medal record
Japan Championships
Silver medal – second place	2025–26 Tokyo	Ice dance
Silver medal – second place	2022–23 Osaka	Singles
Junior Grand Prix Final
Bronze medal – third place	2018–19 Vancouver	Singles

Koshiro Shimada (島田 高志郎, Shimada Kōshirō; born September 11, 2001) is a Japanese figure skater. With ice dance partner, Ikura Kushida, he is the 2025–26 Japanese national silver medalist.

As a singles skater, he is the 2022-23 Japanese national silver medalist, the 2024 Grand Prix de France silver medalist, a three-time ISU Challenger Series medalist, and the 2019 Bavarian Open champion. On the junior level, he is the 2018–19 Junior Grand Prix Final bronze medalist, a three-time ISU Junior Grand Prix medalist, and a two-time Japan Junior national medalist.

== Personal life ==
Koshiro Shimada was born in Ehime Prefecture, Japan. In 2020, he enrolled at Waseda University where he currently studies Human Sciences.

Shimada is bilingual. In addition to Japanese, he learned to speak English while living in Champéry, Switzerland for his training.

== Career ==
=== Singles skating career ===
==== Early years ====
Shimada began learning to skate at the age of six years old. He originally trained in his hometown of Matsuyama before moving with his mother to Okayama, the same city where Daisuke Takahashi and Tatsuki Machida would train, when Shimada was around ten years old. There, he trained at the Shujitsu Gakuen Okayama and was coached by Kotoe Nagasawa.

At the 2013–14 Japan Championships, Shimada won the gold medal on the advanced novice level and finished seventeenth on the junior level. The following year, he finished second on the advanced novice level and sixteenth on the junior level at the 2014–15 Japan Championships.

==== 2015–2016 season: Junior international debut and Youth Olympics ====
Shimada made his junior international debut on the 2015–16 Junior Grand Prix circuit, finishing seventh at 2015 JGP Slovakia and fifth at 2015 JGP Croatia. Ranked fourth at the 2015–16 Japan Championships on the junior level and eleventh on the senior level, he was assigned to the 2016 Winter Youth Olympics in Hamar, Norway, where he finished sixth.

==== 2016–2017 season ====
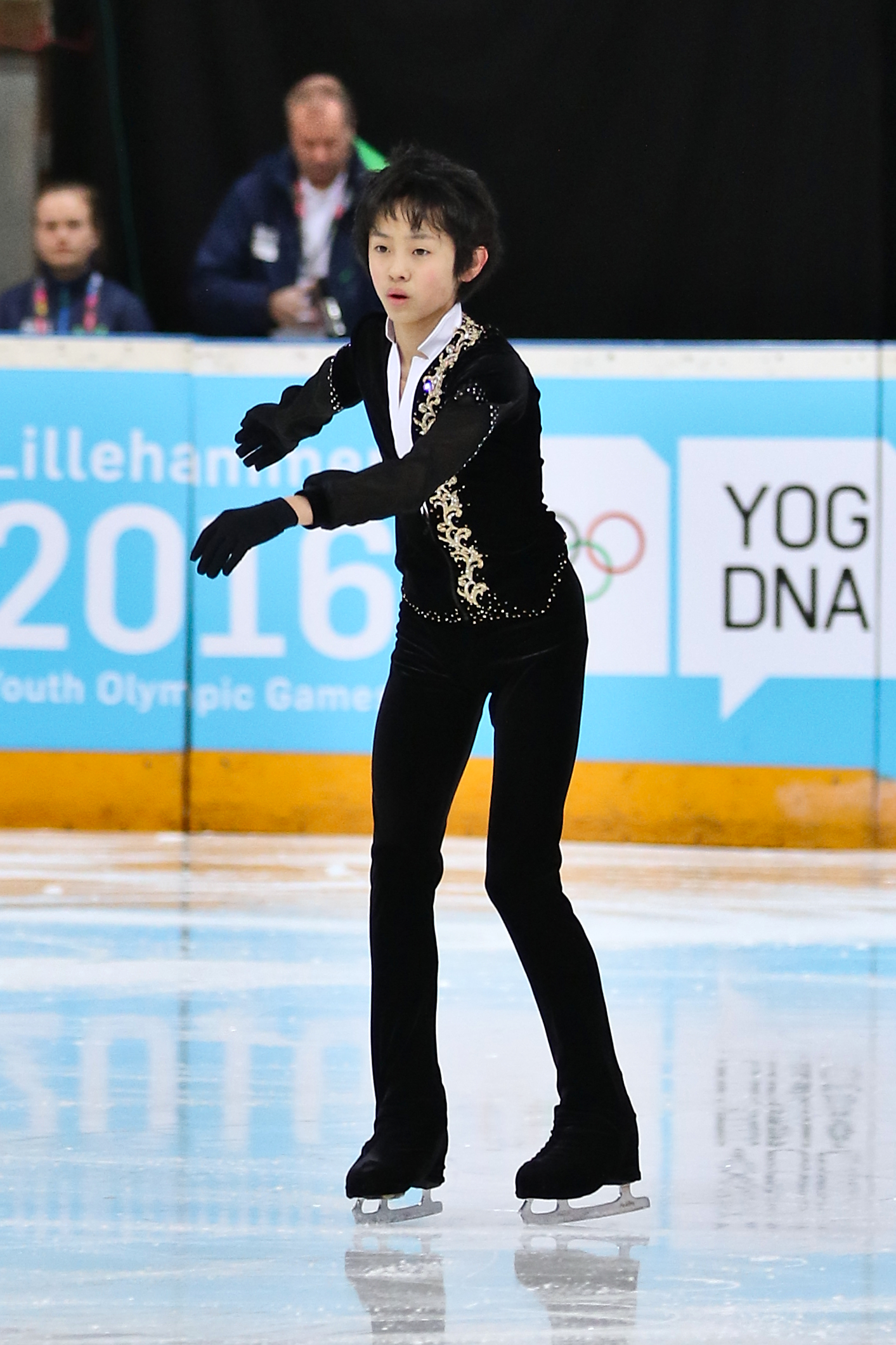
Shimada at the 2016 Winter Youth Olympics

Shimada began the season by winning gold on the junior level of the 2016 Asian Open Trophy. He then went on to compete on the 2016–17 Junior Grand Prix series, he won the bronze medal at 2016 JGP France and finishing fourth at 2016 JGP Estonia. Following a second-place finish in the junior level and a seventh-place finish of the 2016–17 Japan Championships, Shimada was assigned to compete at the 2017 World Junior Championships in Taipei, Taiwan, where he placed fourteenth.

In the spring of 2017, Shimada relocated to Champéry, Switzerland to train under Stéphane Lambiel.

==== 2017–2018 season ====
During the off-season, Shimada tore his left hip abductor muscle. In July, he underwent rehabilitation with a physiotherapist in Toronto, Canada.

He did end up competing on the 2017–18 Junior Grand Prix series, finishing fifth at 2017 JGP Croatia and seventh at 2017 JGP Poland. Shimada would not compete for the remainder of the season.

==== 2018–2019 season: Junior Grand Prix Final bronze medal ====
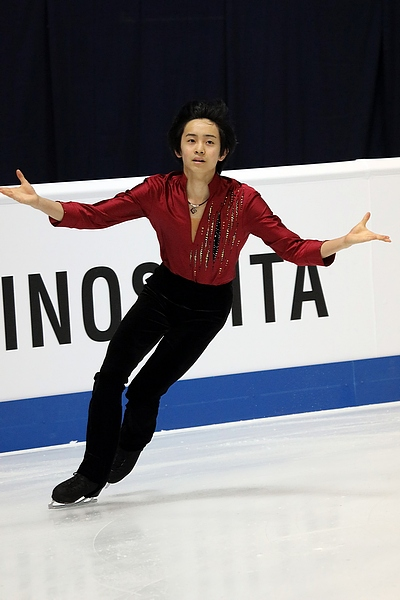
Shimada at the 2019 World Junior Championships

After almost a full year of not competing, Shimada started the season by competing on the 2018–19 Junior Grand Prix series. He won the silver medal at 2018 JGP Austria and the bronze medal at 2018 JGP Slovenia. With these results, Shimada qualified for the 2018–19 Junior Grand Prix Final in Vancouver, British Columbia, Canada.

Following a bronze medal win at the 2018–19 Japan Junior Championships, Shimada won also win bronze at the Junior Grand Prix Final. A couple weeks following the latter event, he would place fifth at the 2018–19 Japan Championships on the senior level.

He subsequently won gold on the senior level of the 2019 Bavarian Open before closing his season with a ninth-place finish at the 2019 World Junior Championships in Zagreb, Croatia.

==== 2019–2020 season: Senior Grand Prix debut ====
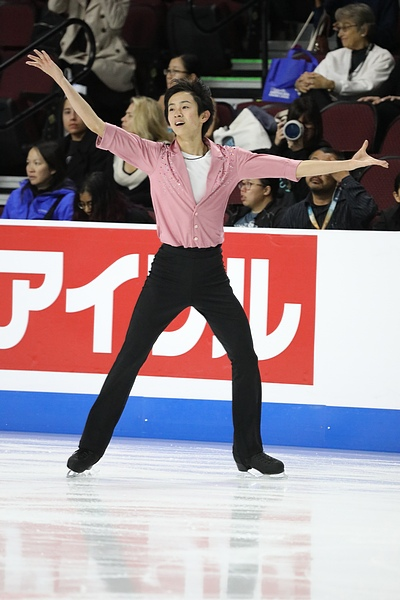
Shimada at 2019 Skate America

Shimada began the season by winning the silver medal at the 2019 CS Nebelhorn Trophy before finishing fourth at the 2019 Japan Open. Going on to make his senior debut on the 2019–20 Grand Prix series, finishing tenth at 2019 Skate America and ninth at the 2019 NHK Trophy. Shimada then finished the season by placing tenth at the 2019–20 Japan Championships.

==== 2020–2021 season ====
Although Shimada was assigned to compete at the 2020 Internationaux de France, the event was ultimately cancelled due to the COVID-19 pandemic. His only other competition was the 2020–21 Japan Championships, where he finished eighth.

==== 2021–2022 season ====
Shimada's first competition of the season was at the 2021 CS Warsaw Cup, where he finished fifth. He would then finish the season by placing tenth at the 2021–22 Japan Championships.

==== 2022–2023 season: Japan national silver medal and Four Continents ====
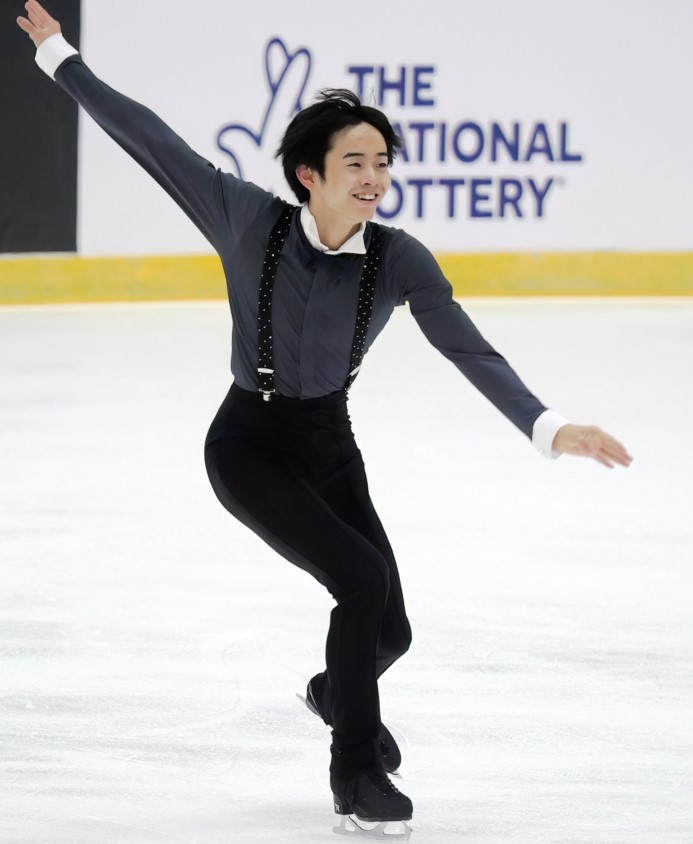
Shimada performing his free skate at the 2022 MK John Wilson Trophy

Starting the season at the 2022 CS Lombardia Trophy, Shimada won the silver medal. He was given two Grand Prix assignments, coming ninth at the 2022 Skate America and fourth at the 2022 MK John Wilson Trophy.

Shimada unexpectedly finished in second place at the 2022–23 Japan Championships, despite a "shaky" landing on his attempted quad Salchow. He was only sixth in the free skate, struggling with a number of jumps, but he remained second overall, less than two points ahead of bronze medalist Kazuki Tomono. Despite being the national silver medalist, the Japan Skating Federation's selection criteria for the 2023 World Championships led to his not being named to one of Japan's three berths, which drew protest from Shimada's friend and training partner, Japanese national champion Shoma Uno. Shimada was instead assigned to compete at the 2023 Four Continents Championships, where he came eleventh.

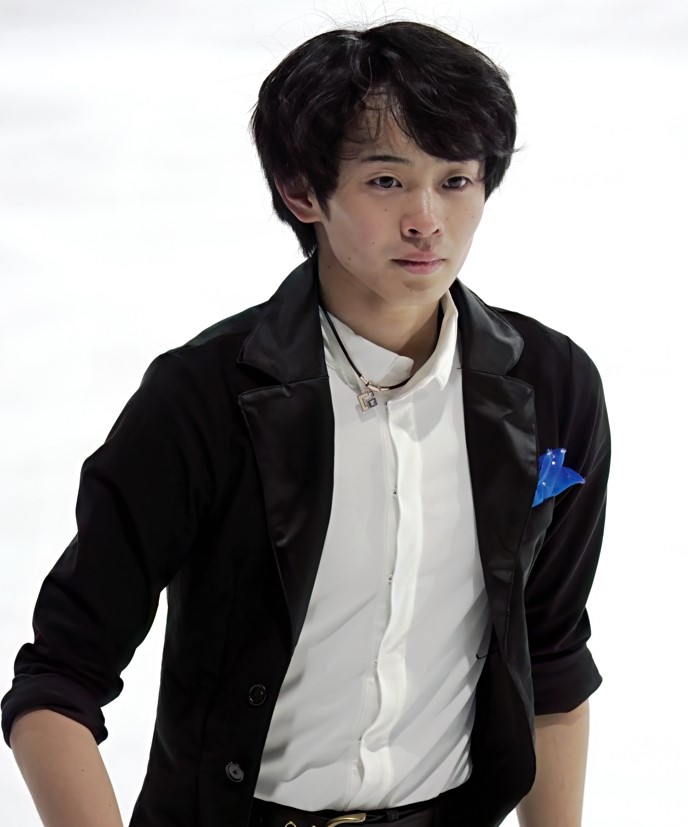
Shimada during practice at the 2023 Grand Prix de France

During the off-season, Shimada was cast to play Sanji for the summer show, One Piece on Ice.

==== 2023–2024 season ====
Shimada began the season at the 2023 CS Nebelhorn Trophy, winning the bronze medal. He was invited to participate in the Japan Open as part of the host team, finishing third in the men's event, while Team Japan won gold.

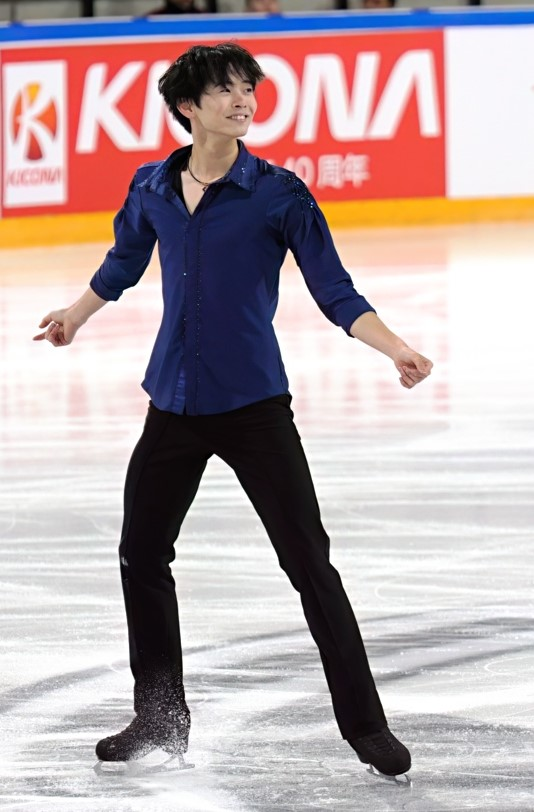
Shimada during his short program at the 2024 Grand Prix de France

The week before competing at the 2023 Grand Prix de France, Shimada twisted his ankle in practice. He ultimately placed tenth at the event, and said he hoped his ankle would be healed in time for his second Grand Prix event.He went on to finish sixth at the 2023 Grand Prix of Espoo. “I feel better than at the GP in France,” he said after the free skate.

He would close the season with an eleventh-place finish at the 2023–24 Japan Championships.

During the off-season, Shimada was cast to portray a younger version of the character Tokio, played by Takurō Ōno, as well as several other roles in the cross-genre ice show Hyoen - The Miracle of the Cross, a loose adaptation of Kenji Miyazawa's novel Night on the Galactic Railroad, starring Daisuke Takahashi.

==== 2024–2025 season: Grand Prix medal ====
Beginning his season by competing on the 2024–25 Grand Prix series, Shimada finished sixth at 2024 Skate America. He would then go on to win his first ISU senior Grand Prix medal, a silver at the 2024 Grand Prix de France. Shimada expressed elation at this result, saying, "I still can't believe that I am here in the medals. I've worked with Stéphane for such a long time, I appreciate his support so much. I want to thank him dearly for all of put hard work together. Last night he told me “you're the best”, and put me in a really positive mindset. I was really calm ahead of my skate today and in a really positive mindset."

In December, Shimada placed ninth at the 2024–25 Japan Championships.

In May, it was announced that Shimada had teamed up with fellow singles skater, Ikura Kushida, with the intention switching to the ice dance discipline. It was subsequently announced that the pair would be coached by Cathy Reed at the Kinoshita Academy in Kyoto.

During the summer, Shimada was cast as Inukai Takeru in the storytelling ice show Hyoen – Mirror-Patterend Demon, starring Daisuke Takahashi and Takahisa Masuda.

=== Ice dance with Ikura Kushida ===
==== 2025–2026 season: Debut of Kushida/Shimada ====
In late October, Kushida/Shimada debuted as a team at the 2025 Western Sectional Championships, the qualifying competition for the Japanese National Championships. They won the event, almost sixteen points ahead of the second placed team, Sasaki/Ikeda.

At the beginning of December they competed at their first international competition, the 2025 CS Golden Spin of Zagreb, where they placed thirteenth, narrowly missing the required technical minimum for the 2026 Winter Olympics and Four Continents Championships by 1.56 points. Shimada stated: "We are disappointed that we didn't achieve the minimum score we were aiming for. But as our first international competition experience, it was very fulfilling and satisfying."

A couple weeks later, Kushida/Shimada won the silver medal at the 2025–26 Japan Championships behind Yoshida/Morita.

==== 2026–2027 season ====
Kushida/Shimada began their season by placing 7th at the 2026 Kinoshita Group Cup.

== Programs ==
=== Ice dance with Ikura Kushida ===
Season	Rhythm dance	Free dance	Exhibition
2026–2027	And The Waltz Goes On by Anthony Hopkins; Libertango by Astor Piazzolla choreo. by Cathy Reed	Akram Khan's Giselle by Vincenzo Lamagna choreo. by Kaitlyn Weaver	
2025–2026	Got the Groove (SM Radio Edit); Show Me Something Special; Got the Groove (SM Radio Edit); Got the Groove 2.8 (Caramba Short Traxx Remix) by SM-Trax choreo. by Cathy Reed	Moonlight Serenade by Glenn Miller performed by Boston Pops & John Williams; Theme from Sabrina by John Williams choreo. by Cathy Reed	Faith (from Sing) by Stevie Wonder & Ariana Grande choreo. by Kana Muramoto & Daisuke Takahashi

=== Men's singles ===
Season	Short program	Free skating	Exhibition
2024–2025	Can't Take My Eyes Off You by Bob Crewe & Bob Gaudio performed by Shawn Mendes choreo. by Shae-Lynn Bourne	Danse Macabre by Camille Saint-Saëns choreo. by Stéphane Lambiel	Not a Damn Thing Changed by Lukas Graham choreo. by Kana Muramoto
2023–2024	Sing, Sing, Sing (with a Swing) by Louis Prima choreo. by Jeffrey Buttle	Danse Macabre by Camille Saint-Saëns choreo. by Stéphane Lambiel	Come What May (from Moulin Rouge!) by Ewan McGregor & Nicole Kidman
2022–2023	Sing, Sing, Sing (with a Swing) by Louis Prima choreo. by Jeffrey Buttle	City Memories (from City Lights) by Charlie Chaplin choreo. by Stéphane Lambiel	Come What May (from Moulin Rouge!) by Ewan McGregor & Nicole Kidman
2021–2022	Giving Up by Donny Hathaway, Van McCoy choreo. by Stéphane Lambiel	City Memories (from City Lights) by Charlie Chaplin choreo. by Stéphane Lambiel	
2020–2021	Fire Dance (from Illumination) by Jennifer Thomas choreo. by Kenji Miyamoto	Rhapsody on a Theme of Paganini by Sergei Rachmaninoff choreo. by Stéphane Lambiel	I Will Remain by Matthew and the Atlas choreo. by Stéphane Lambiel
2019–2020	Stay by Cynthia Erivo and Oliver Tompsett choreo. by Sarah Dolan	The Artist Ouverture; George Valentin; Comme Une Rosee de Larmes; Peppy and George (from The Artist) by Ludovic Bource choreo. by Stéphane Lambiel	I Want to Break Free by Queen
2018–2019	Adios by Benjamin Clementine choreo. by Stéphane Lambiel	Winter in Buenos Aires by Astor Piazzolla choreo. by Stéphane Lambiel	She performed by Elvis Costello
2017–2018	Pina (soundtrack): Rooftop by Thomas Hanreich; Lillies of the Valley; All Names by Jun Miyake choreo. by Stéphane Lambiel	Charms (from W.E.); Forbidden Love (from Romeo & Juliet (2013 film)) by Abel Korzeniowski; Found by Kerry Muzzey choreo. by Nikolai Morozov	
2016–2017	Art on Ice by Edvin Marton choreo. by Misao Sato	Romeo + Juliet: O Verona by Craig Armstrong; Kissing You by Des'ree; O Verona by Craig Armstrong choreo. by Kenji Miyamoto	

== Competitive highlights ==
- GP – Event of the ISU Grand Prix Series
- JGP – Event of the ISU Junior Grand Prix Series
- CS – Event of the ISU Challenger Series
- C – Event was cancelled
- Medals at team events are awarded for the team results only. Individual placements at team events are listed in parentheses.

=== Ice dance with Ikura Kushida ===
Competition placements at senior level
Season	2025–26	2026–27
GP NHK Trophy		TBD
CS Kinoshita Group Cup		7th
CS Golden Spin of Zagreb	13th	
Japan Championships	2nd	

=== Men's singles ===
Competition placements at senior level
Season	2018–19	2019–20	2020–21	2021–22	2022–23	2023–24	2024–25
Four Continents Championships					11th		
Japan Championships	5th	10th	8th	10th	2nd	11th	9th
GP Finland						6th	
GP France			C			10th	2nd
GP NHK Trophy		9th					
GP Skate America		10th			9th		6th
GP Wilson Trophy					4th		
CS Lombardia Trophy					2nd		
CS Nebelhorn Trophy		2nd				3rd	
CS Warsaw Cup				5th			
Bavarian Open	1st						
Coupe du Printemps					2nd		
Japan Open		2nd (4th)				1st (3rd)	

Competition placements at junior level
Season	2013–14	2014–15	2015–16	2016–17	2017–18	2018–19
Winter Youth Olympics			6th			
World Junior Championships				14th		9th
Junior Grand Prix Final						3rd
Japan Championships (Senior)			11th	7th		
Japan Championships (Junior)	17th	16th	4th	2nd		3rd
JGP Austria						2nd
JGP Croatia			5th		5th	
JGP Estonia				4th		
JGP France				3rd		
JGP Poland					7th	
JGP Slovakia			7th			
JGP Slovenia						3rd
Asian Open Trophy				1st		

== Detailed results ==
=== Ice dance with Ikura Kushida ===
ISU personal best scores in the +5/-5 GOE System
Segment	Type	Score	Event
Total	TSS	161.76	2026 CS Kinoshita Group Cup
Rhythm dance	TSS	64.86	2026 CS Kinoshita Group Cup
Rhythm dance	TES	36.93	2026 CS Kinoshita Group Cup
Rhythm dance	PCS	27.93	2026 CS Kinoshita Group Cup
Free dance	TSS	96.90	2026 CS Kinoshita Group Cup
Free dance	TES	53.00	2026 CS Kinoshita Group Cup
Free dance	PCS	44.90	2026 CS Kinoshita Group Cup

Results in the 2026–27 season
Date	Event	RD		FD		Total	
Date	Event	P	Score	P	Score	P	Score
Sep 4–6, 2026	(Japan) 2026 Kinoshita Group Cup	7	64.86	8	96.90	7	161.76
Nov 27–29, 2026	(Japan) 2026 NHK Trophy						TBD

Results in the 2025–26 season
Date	Event	RD		FD		Total	
Date	Event	P	Score	P	Score	P	Score
Dec 3–6, 2025	(Croatia) 2025 CS Golden Spin of Zagreb	12	59.19	12	89.43	13	148.62
Dec 18–21, 2025	2025–26 Japan Championships	2	64.99	2	100.76	2	165.67

=== Men's singles ===
ISU personal best scores in the +5/-5 GOE System
Segment	Type	Score	Event
Total	TSS	247.43	2023 CS Nebelhorn Trophy
Short program	TSS	90.55	2021 CS Warsaw Cup
Short program	TES	49.27	2022 CS Lombardia Trophy
Short program	PCS	41.80	2021 CS Warsaw Cup
Free skating	TSS	167.86	2023 CS Nebelhorn Trophy
Free skating	TES	88.78	2023 CS Nebelhorn Trophy
Free skating	PCS	81.42	2022 CS Lombardia Trophy

==== Senior level ====
Results in the 2015–16 season
Date	Event	SP		FS		Total	
Date	Event	P	Score	P	Score	P	Score
Dec 24–27, 2015	2015–16 Japan Championships	17	58.41	9	130.35	11	188.76

Results in the 2016–17 season
Date	Event	SP		FS		Total	
Date	Event	P	Score	P	Score	P	Score
Dec 22–25, 2016	2016–17 Japan Championships	10	62.66	6	137.52	7	200.18

Results in the 2018–19 season
Date	Event	SP		FS		Total	
Date	Event	P	Score	P	Score	P	Score
Dec 20–24, 2018	2018–19 Japan Championships	3	80.46	11	139.32	5	219.78
Feb 5–10, 2019	(Germany) 2019 Bavarian Open	2	69.29	1	141.51	1	210.80

Results in the 2019–20 season
Date	Event	SP		FS		Total	
Date	Event	P	Score	P	Score	P	Score
Sep 25–28, 2019	(Germany) 2019 CS Nebelhorn Trophy	1	74.32	4	140.66	2	212.95
Oct 5, 2019	2019 Japan Open	–	–	4	153.37	2	–
Oct 18–20, 2019	(United States) 2019 Skate America	11	72.12	7	143.91	10	216.03
Nov 22–24, 2019	(Japan) 2019 NHK Trophy	6	75.98	10	137.67	9	213.65
Dec 18–22, 2019	2019–20 Japan Championships	5	80.59	13	131.65	10	212.24

Results in the 2020–21 season
Date	Event	SP		FS		Total	
Date	Event	P	Score	P	Score	P	Score
Dec 24–27, 2020	2020–21 Japan Championships	9	71.88	7	149.06	8	220.94

Results in the 2021–22 season
Date	Event	SP		FS		Total	
Date	Event	P	Score	P	Score	P	Score
Nov 17–20, 2021	(Poland) 2021 CS Warsaw Cup	2	90.55	9	138.22	5	228.77
Dec 22–26, 2021	2021–22 Japan Championships	9	86.76	10	146.91	10	233.67

Results in the 2022–23 season
Date	Event	SP		FS		Total	
Date	Event	P	Score	P	Score	P	Score
Sep 16–19, 2022	(Italy) 2022 CS Lombardia Trophy	1	89.18	4	148.84	2	235.90
Oct 21–23, 2022	(United States) 2022 Skate America	12	62.54	5	152.58	9	215.12
Nov 11–13, 2022	(United Kingdom) 2022 MK John Wilson Trophy	5	80.84	4	166.33	4	247.17
Dec 21–25, 2022	2022–23 Japan Championships	2	87.69	6	164.87	2	252.56
Feb 7–12, 2023	(United States) 2023 Four Continents Championships	10	74.06	8	143.79	11	217.85
Mar 17–19, 2023	(Luxembourg) 2023 Coupe du Printemps	3	73.99	3	140.99	2	214.98

Results in the 2023–24 season
Date	Event	SP		FS		Total	
Date	Event	P	Score	P	Score	P	Score
Sep 21–24, 2023	(Germany) 2023 CS Nebelhorn Trophy	3	79.57	3	167.86	3	247.43
Oct 7, 2023	2023 Japan Open	–	–	3	164.26	1	–
Nov 3–5, 2023	2023 Grand Prix de France	8	79.30	11	137.88	10	217.18
Nov 17–19, 2023	(Finland) 2023 Grand Prix of Espoo	4	77.81	6	140.63	6	218.44
Dec 20–24, 2023	2023–24 Japan Championships	11	76.57	12	139.40	11	215.97

Results in the 2024–25 season
Date	Event	SP		FS		Total	
Date	Event	P	Score	P	Score	P	Score
Oct 18–20, 2024	(United States) 2024 Skate America	6	81.88	10	137.80	6	219.68
Nov 1–3, 2024	2024 Grand Prix de France	5	80.42	3	153.42	2	233.84
Dec 19–22, 2024	2024–25 Japan Championships	15	73.20	5	150.84	9	224.04

==== Junior level ====
Results in the 2015–16 season
Date	Event	SP		FS		Total	
Date	Event	P	Score	P	Score	P	Score
Aug 19–23, 2015	2015 JGP Slovakia	12	47.77	4	122.12	7	169.89
Oct 7–10, 2015	2015 JGP Croatia	8	58.38	4	122.69	5	181.07
Nov 21–23, 2015	2015–16 Japan Championships (Junior)	8	55.04	2	122.39	4	177.43
Feb 12–21, 2016	(Norway) 2016 Winter Youth Olympics	6	63.18	6	119.34	6	182.52

Results in the 2016–17 season
Date	Event	SP		FS		Total	
Date	Event	P	Score	P	Score	P	Score
Aug 4–7, 2016	(Philippines) 2016 Asian Open Trophy	3	60.22	1	124.87	1	185.09
Aug 24–28, 2016	2016 JGP France	5	59.32	3	126.86	3	186.18
Sep 28 – Oct 2, 2016	2016 JGP Estonia	4	70.48	4	132.81	4	203.29
Nov 18–20, 2016	2016–17 Japan Championships (Junior)	2	66.19	2	132.01	2	198.20
Mar 15–19, 2017	(Taiwan) 2017 World Junior Championships	12	68.77	13	125.33	14	194.10

Results in the 2017–18 season
Date	Event	SP		FS		Total	
Date	Event	P	Score	P	Score	P	Score
Sep 27–30, 2017	2017 JGP Croatia	6	64.85	5	131.87	5	196.72
Oct 4–7, 2017	2017 JGP Poland	12	59.47	4	130.99	7	190.46

Results in the 2018–19 season
Date	Event	SP		FS		Total	
Date	Event	P	Score	P	Score	P	Score
Aug 29 – Sep 1, 2018	2018 JGP Austria	3	74.78	2	145.67	2	220.45
Oct 3–6, 2018	2018 JGP Slovenia	4	73.48	5	139.47	3	212.95
Nov 23–25, 2018	2018–19 Japan Championships (Junior)	1	82.35	5	127.68	3	210.03
Dec 6–9, 2018	(Canada) 2018–19 Junior Grand Prix Final	4	73.97	4	140.41	3	214.38
Mar 4–10, 2019	(Croatia) 2019 World Junior Championships	12	74.89	8	137.89	9	212.78
