= Yuna Shiraiwa =

Japanese figure skater

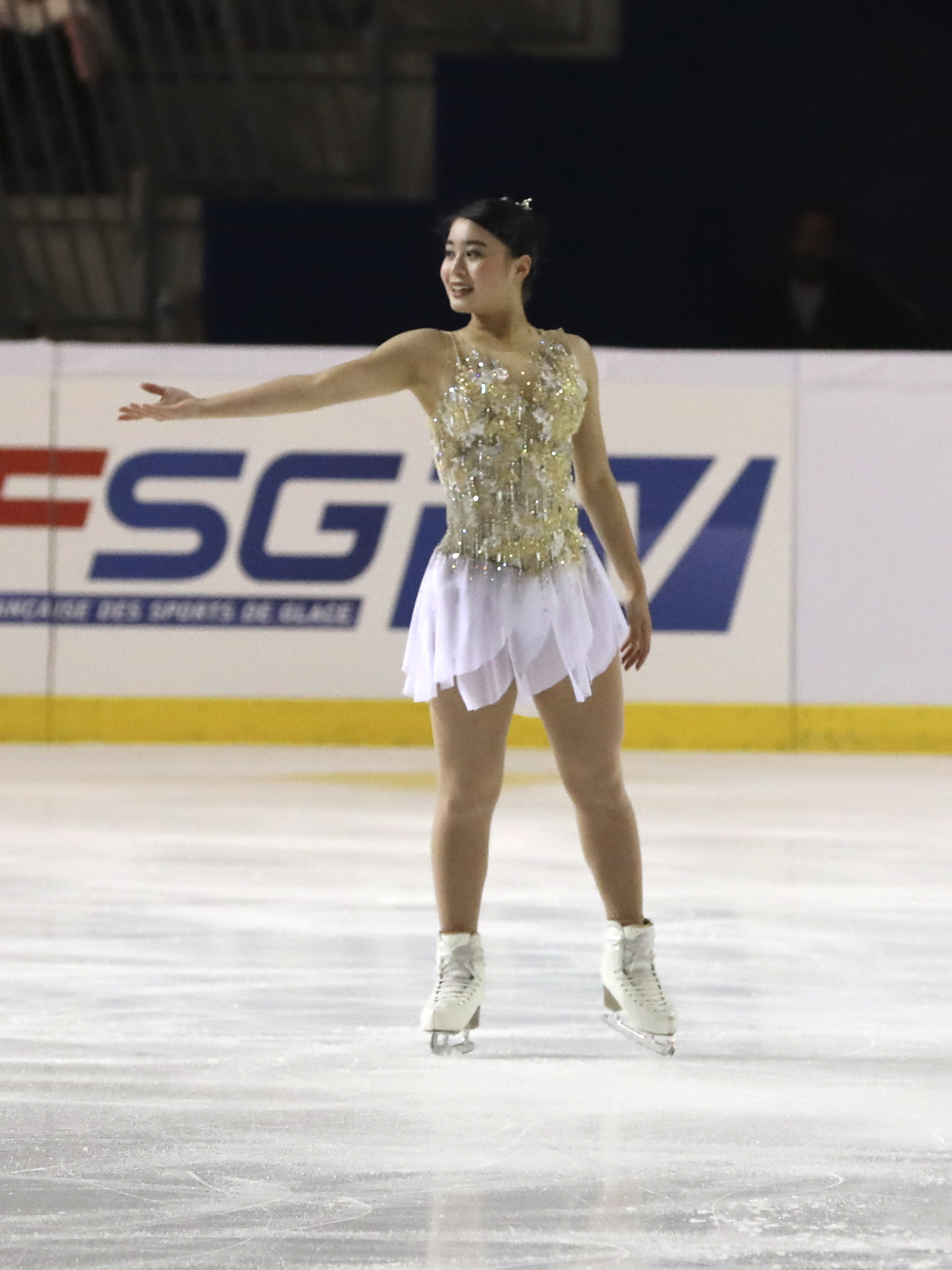
- Shiraiwa at the 2019 Internationaux de France

Personal information
- Native name: 白岩 優奈
- Born: November 26, 2001 (age 24) Kyoto, Japan
- Home town: Takatsuki
- Height: 1.51 m (4 ft 11 1/2 in)

Figure skating career
- Country: Japan
- Coach: Takeshi Honda; Kohei Yoshino
- Skating club: Kansai University
- Began skating: 2007
- Retired: December 22, 2024

Yuna Shiraiwa (白岩 優奈, Shiraiwa Yūna; born November 26, 2001) is a former Japanese figure skater. She is the 2018 CS Asian Open silver medalist, the 2017 Asian Trophy silver medalist, and the 2018 Coupe du Printemps bronze medalist. At the junior level, she is a three-time ISU Junior Grand Prix medalist (two gold, one silver), and two-time Japanese Junior national silver medalist. She finished within the top five at three World Junior Championships (2016, 2017, 2019).

== Personal life ==
Shiraiwa was born on November 26, 2001, in Kyoto, Japan.

She is currently a student at Kansai University.

== Career ==
=== Early years ===
Shiraiwa began skating in 2006, after being inspired by Shizuka Arakawa's 2006 Olympic victory. Mie Hamada became her coach when Shiraiwa was six years old.

She competed at the 2014–15 Japan Junior Championships but did not qualify for the free skate, having ranked 27th in the short program.

=== 2015–2016 season ===
Shiraiwa debuted on the ISU Junior Grand Prix (JGP) circuit during the 2015–16 season. At her first JGP assignment, in Colorado Springs, Colorado, she placed fifth in the short program and first in the free skate, winning the gold medal by a margin of 8.06 points ahead of silver medalist Marin Honda. Ranked third in the short and first in the free, she outscored Russia's Alisa Fedichkina by 0.42 for gold at the JGP in Logroño, Spain. Shiraiwa's results qualified her for the JGP Final in Barcelona.

In November, Shiraiwa won the silver medal at the 2015-16 Japan Junior Championships behind Wakaba Higuchi. A month later, at the JGP Final, Shiraiwa finished 5th. Making her debut at the Japan Championships on the senior level, she placed 5th, and was named as a member of the Youth Olympic and the Junior World teams.

At the 2016 Youth Olympics in Hamar, Norway, Shiraiwa finished fourth, before going on to place fourth at the 2016 World Junior Championships in Debrecen, Hungary.

=== 2016–17 season ===
Competing on the Junior Grand Prix, Shiraiwa finished fourth at the 2016 JGP Russia and won the silver at the 2016 JGP Germany.

She went on to compete at the 2016–17 Japan Junior Championships, winning the silver medal behind Kaori Sakamoto. At the senior nationals, Shiraiwa placed seventeenth in the short program but third in the free skate, ultimately moving up to sixth place overall.

Selected to compete at the 2017 World Junior Championships in Taipei, Taiwan, Shiraiwa finished fifth.

=== 2017–18 season ===
Making her senior international debut, Shiraiwa won the silver medal at the Asian Open Trophy. She then went on to compete at the 2017 CS Finlandia Trophy, where she finished seventh.

Debuting on the senior Grand Prix series, Shiraiwa finished eighth at the 2017 NHK Trophy and sixth at the 2017 Internationaux de France.

At the 2017–18 Japan Championships, Shiraiwa placed ninth. She then closed her season with a bronze medal at the 2018 Coupe du Printemps.

=== 2018–19 season ===
Shiraiwa began her season by winning silver at the 2018 CS Asian Open Figure Skating Trophy and placing fifth at the 2018 CS U.S. Classic.

On the 2018–19 Grand Prix series, Shiraiwa finished fourth at the 2018 Grand Prix of Helsinki and fifth at the 2018 Rostelecom Cup.

At the 2018–19 Japan Championships, Shiraiwa finished ninth, before going on to win the 2019 Bavarian Open on the junior level.

Selected to compete at the 2019 World Junior Championships in Zagreb, Croatia, Shiraiwa finished fifth.

=== 2019–20 season ===
Competing on the 2019–20 Grand Prix series, Shiraiwa placed ninth at the 2019 Internationaux de France and tenth at the 2019 Rostelecom Cup.

She withdrew from the 2019–20 Japan Championships due to an injury in her right tibia.

=== 2020–21 season ===
Shiraiwa finished ninth at the 2020–21 Japan Championships.

Following the season, Shiraiwa left longtime coach Mie Hamada to train under Takeshi Honda.

=== 2021–22 season ===
Competing at the 2021–22 Japan Championships, Shiraiwa finished twenty-third.

=== 2022–23 season ===
Shiraiwa announced her intention to sit out the 2022–23 figure skating season in November to "physically and mentally recharge."

=== 2023–24 season ===
Returning to compete at the 2023–24 Japan Championships, Shiraiwa finished in twenty-second place.

=== 2024–25 season ===
Shiraiwa competed at the 2024–25 Japan Championships, where she finished nineteenth. Following the event, she announced her retirement from competitive figure skating.

== Programs ==
Season	Short program	Free skating	Exhibition
2024–2025	Titanic; Rose by James Horner; My Heart Will Go On by Celine Dion choreo. by Kohei Yoshino	The Mission; Gabriel's Oboe; Vita Nostra by Ennio Morricone choreo. by Akiko Suzuki	Fix You by Coldplay
2023–2024	Concertino Bianco by Alexei Lubimov, Heinrich Schiff, & Deutsche Kammerphilharmonie Bremen choreo. by Stéphane Lambiel	The Mission; Gabriel's Oboe; Vita Nostra by Ennio Morricone choreo. by Akiko Suzuki	
2022–23	Did not compete this season		
2021–2022	Feeling Good performed by Avicii choreo. by Benoît Richaud	Scheherazade by Nikolai Rimsky-Korsakov choreo. by Benoît Richaud	
2020–2021	East of Eden by Lee Holdridge choreo. by Ernesto Martinez	Amen.; To Warm the World - Gerstein's Theme; The Bishop's Complaint/The Train II; The Train III by Armand Amar choreo. by Benoît Richaud	
2019–2020	Concertino Bianco for Piano by Georgs Pelēcis choreo. by Stéphane Lambiel	Amen.; To Warm the World - Gerstein's Theme; The Bishop's Complaint/The Train II; The Train III by Armand Amar choreo. by Benoît Richaud	Elastic Heart by Sia choreo. by Cathy Reed
2018–2019	All Aboard by Club des Belugas choreo. by Tom Dickson	Pictures at an Exhibition by Modest Mussorgsky choreo. by Tom Dickson	Stupid Cupid performed by Mandy Moore; Love Is Strange by Mickey & Sylvia
2017–2018	La fille aux cheveux de lin by Claude Debussy choreo. by Jeffrey Buttle	Pictures at an Exhibition by Modest Mussorgsky choreo. by Tom Dickson	If My Friends Could See Me Now (from Sweet Charity) performed by Christina Applegate
2016–2017	I Got Rhythm by George Gershwin performed by Nikki Yanofsky choreo. by Jeffrey Buttle	A Little Night Music by Stephen Sondheim; Night Waltz; Send In the Clowns; Night Waltz choreo. by Tom Dickson; Notre-Dame de Paris by Riccardo Cocciante; Le Temps des cathédrales (The Age of the Cathedrals); Les Sans-papiers (The Refugees); Vivre (To Live) choreo. by Cathy Reed	Titanium performed by Madilyn Paige
2015–2016	Over the Rainbow by Harold Arlen choreo. by Cathy Reed	A Little Night Music by Stephen Sondheim; Night Waltz; Send In the Clowns; Night Waltz choreo. by Tom Dickson	Defying Gravity (from Wicked) performed by Idina Menzel
2014–2015		Giselle by Adolphe Adam	

== Competitive highlights ==
GP: Grand Prix; CS: Challenger Series; JGP: Junior Grand Prix

International
Event	14–15	15–16	16–17	17–18	18–19	19–20	20–21	21–22	23–24	24–25
GP Finland					4th					
GP France				6th		9th				
GP NHK Trophy				8th						
GP Rostelecom					5th	10th				
CS Finlandia				7th						
CS Asian Open					2nd					
CS U.S. Classic					5th	WD				
Asian Open				2nd						
Printemps				3rd						
International: Junior
Junior Worlds		4th	5th		5th					
Youth Olympics		4th								
JGP Final		5th								
JGP Germany			2nd							
JGP Russia			4th							
JGP Spain		1st								
JGP U.S.		1st								
Bavarian Open					1st					
National
Japan		5th	6th	9th	9th	WD	9th	23rd	22nd	19th
Japan Junior	27th	2nd	2nd							
Team events
Youth Olympics		5th T 1st P								
WD = Withdrew; T = Team result; P = Personal result. Medals awarded for team result only.

== Detailed results ==
ISU Personal best highlighted in bold.

=== Senior level ===
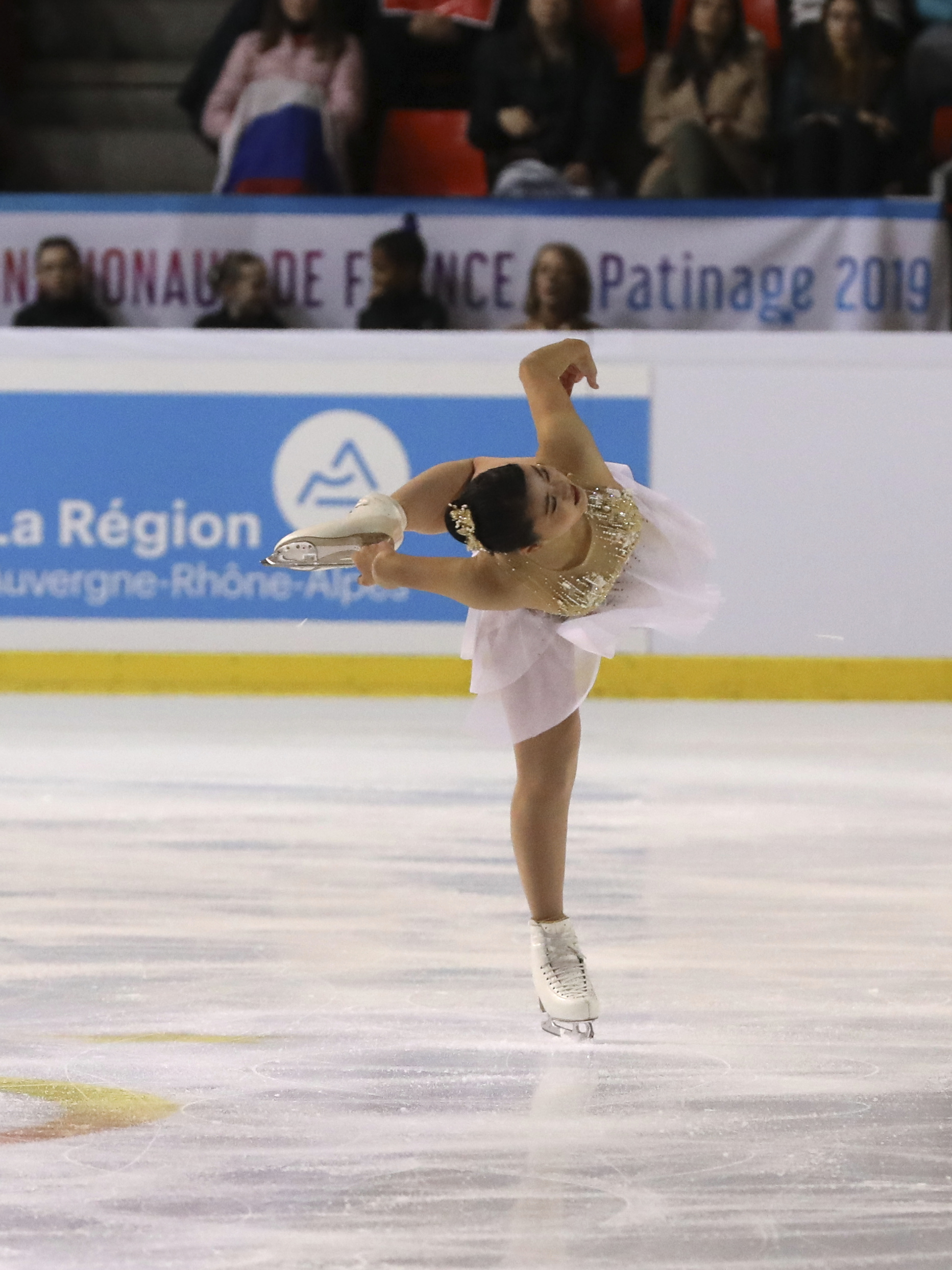
Shiraiwa at the 2019 Internationaux de France

2024–25 season
Date	Event	SP	FS	Total
December 19–22, 2024	2024–25 Japan Championships	18; 59.00	18; 119.72	19; 178.72
2023–24 season
Date	Event	SP	FS	Total
December 20–24, 2023	2023–24 Japan Championships	22; 53.42	22; 95.21	22; 148.63
2021–22 season
Date	Event	SP	FS	Total
December 22–26, 2021	2021–22 Japan Championships	21; 56.93	23; 88.96	23; 145.89
2020–21 season
Date	Event	SP	FS	Total
December 24–27, 2020	2020–21 Japan Championships	10; 63.96	9; 126.43	9; 190.39
2019–20 season
Date	Event	SP	FS	Total
November 15–17, 2019	2019 Rostelecom Cup	7; 60.57	10; 109.46	10; 170.03
November 1–3, 2019	2019 Internationaux de France	7; 63.12	10; 98.59	9; 161.71
2018–19 season
Date	Event	SP	FS	Total
December 20–24, 2018	2018–19 Japan Championships	12; 59.99	9; 123.17	9; 183.16
November 16–18, 2018	2018 Rostelecom Cup	5; 60.35	4; 120.58	5; 180.93
November 2–4, 2018	2018 Grand Prix of Helsinki	2; 63.77	5; **127.69**	4; 191.46
September 12–16, 2018	2018 CS U.S. International Classic	6; 55.35	4; 115.39	5; 170.74
August 1–5, 2018	2018 CS Asian Open Trophy	4; 54.47	1; 118.54	2; 173.01
2017–18 season
Date	Event	SP	FS	Total
March 16–18, 2018	2018 Coupe du Printemps	3; 65.67	3; 116.12	3; 181.79
December 21–24, 2017	2017–18 Japan Championships	8; 63.33	7; 128.36	9; 191.69
November 17–19, 2017	2017 Internationaux de France	3; **66.05**	6; 127.13	6; **193.18**
November 10–12, 2017	2017 NHK Trophy	8; 57.34	8; 114.60	8; 171.94
October 6–8, 2017	2017 CS Finlandia Trophy	8; 52.98	6; 119.27	7; 172.25
August 2–5, 2017	2017 Asian Open Trophy	2; 62.03	2; 102.33	2; 164.36

=== Junior level ===
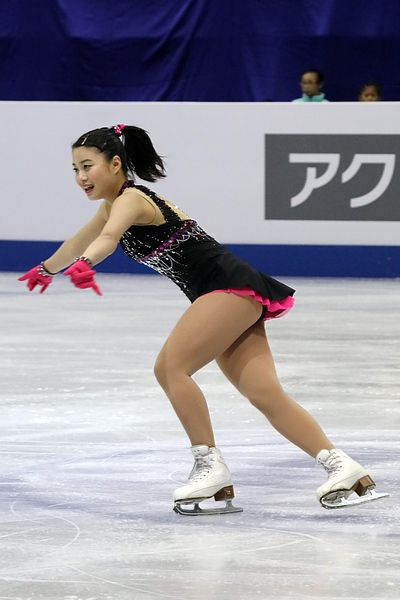
Shiraiwa at the 2017 World Junior Championships

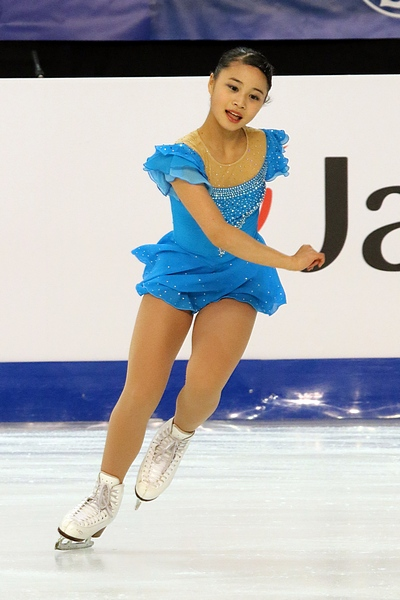
Shiraiwa at the 2016 World Junior Championships

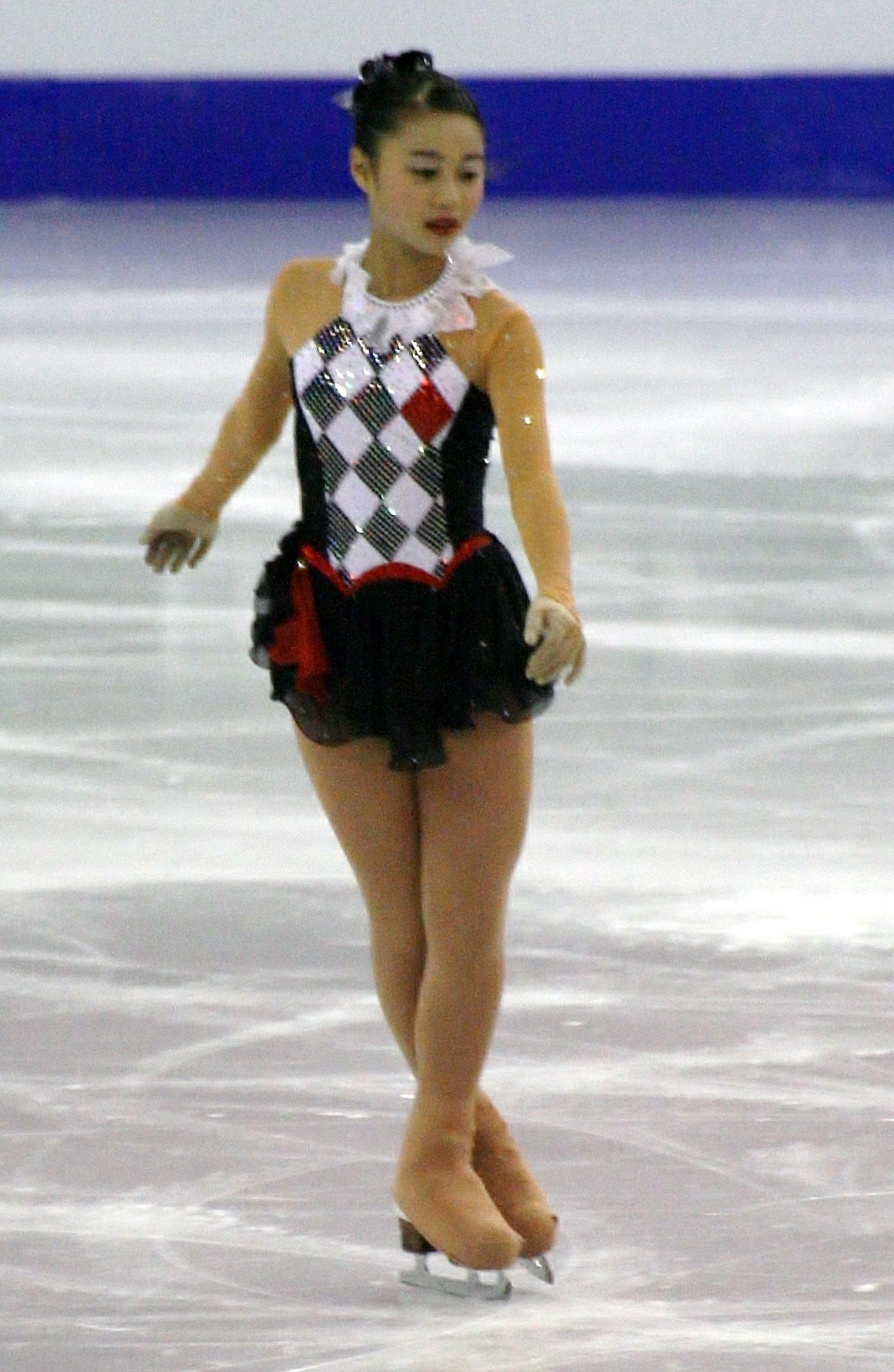
Shiraiwa at the 2015–16 JGP Final

2018–19 season
Date	Event	Level	SP	FS	Total
March 4–10, 2019	2019 World Junior Championships	Junior	6; 62.08	4; 123.38	5; 185.46
February 5–10, 2019	2019 Bavarian Open	Junior	1; 67.26	1; 121.19	1; 188.45
2016–17 season
Date	Event	Level	SP	FS	Total
March 15–19, 2017	2017 World Junior Championships	Junior	5; 62.96	5; 111.42	5; 174.38
December 22–25, 2016	2016–17 Japan Championships	Senior	17; 54.30	3; 131.07	6; 185.37
November 18–20, 2016	2016–17 Japan Junior Championships	Junior	3; 59.16	1; 125.97	2; 185.13
October 5–9, 2016	2016 JGP Germany	Junior	6; 54.60	2; 122.06	2; 176.66
September 14–18, 2016	2016 JGP Russia	Junior	3; 59.02	4; 110.65	4; 169.67
2015–16 season
Date	Event	Level	SP	FS	Total
March 14–20, 2016	2016 World Junior Championships	Junior	8; 56.23	5; 115.36	4; 171.59
February 12–21, 2016	2016 Youth Olympic Games	Junior	1; 60.87	5; 105.79	4; 166.66
December 24–27, 2015	2015–16 Japan Championships	Senior	6; 61.92	5; 124.41	5; 186.33
December 10–13, 2015	2015−16 JGP Final	Junior	5; 60.68	5; 113.14	5; 173.82
November 21–23, 2015	2015–16 Japan Junior Championships	Junior	2; 62.77	2; 121.39	2; 184.16
Sept. 30 – Oct. 4, 2015	2015 JGP Spain	Junior	3; 62.51	1; 124.29	1; 186.80
September 2–5, 2015	2015 JGP United States	Junior	5; 56.26	1; 108.24	1; 164.50
2014–15 season
Date	Event	Level	SP	FS	Total
February 11–15, 2015	2014 Bavarian Open	Novice	2; 39.03	2; 70.43	2; 109.46
November 22–24, 2014	2014–15 Japan Junior Championships	Junior	27; 40.07	–	–
