= Cathy Reed =

Japanese ice dancer

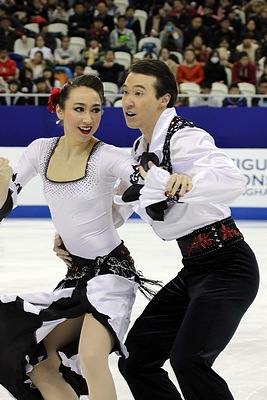
- Cathy and Chris Reed at the 2015 World Championships

Personal information
- Native name: キャシー・リード
- Full name: Catherine Margaret Reed
- Born: June 5, 1987 (age 39) Kalamazoo, Michigan, U.S.
- Home town: Warren Township, New Jersey, U.S.
- Height: 5 ft 6 in (1.68 m)

Figure skating career
- Country: Japan
- Partner: Chris Reed (2005–15)
- Skating club: Arctic Edge FSC; Kinoshita Club Tokyo
- Began skating: 1994
- Retired: April 19, 2015
Event	Gold medal – first place	Silver medal – second place	Bronze medal – third place
Japan Championships	7	1	0
World Team Trophy	1	0	3
Medal list
Japan Championships
Gold medal – first place	2007–08 Osaka	Ice dance
Gold medal – first place	2008–09 Nagano	Ice dance
Gold medal – first place	2009–10 Osaka	Ice dance
Gold medal – first place	2010–11 Nagano	Ice dance
Gold medal – first place	2012–13 Sapporo	Ice dance
Gold medal – first place	2013–14 Saitama	Ice dance
Gold medal – first place	2014–15 Nagano	Ice dance
Silver medal – second place	2006–07 Nagoya	Ice dance
World Team Trophy
Gold medal – first place	2012 Tokyo	Team
Bronze medal – third place	2009 Tokyo	Team
Bronze medal – third place	2013 Tokyo	Team
Bronze medal – third place	2015 Tokyo	Team

Japanese name
- Kana: キャシー・リード

Catherine Margaret Reed (キャシー・リード, Cathy Reed; born June 5, 1987) is a retired American-born Japanese ice dancer. With her brother Chris Reed, she is a seven-time Japanese national champion (2008–2011, 2013–2015).

== Personal life ==
Reed was born in Kalamazoo, Michigan. Her mother is Japanese and her father is American. She was a dual citizen of Japan and the United States until she turned 22. Japanese law required those who are dual citizens at birth to relinquish their dual citizenship, so Cathy Reed chose Japanese citizenship at the age of 22 in order to continue to represent Japan in ice dancing. She competed in ice dancing with her younger brother, Chris Reed, until her retirement in April 2015. Her younger sister, Allison Reed, is also an ice dancer, who represented Georgia with Otar Japaridze, and Israel with Vasili Rogov; she currently represents Lithuania with Saulius Ambrulevičius.

Reed and her skating siblings grew up in Warren Township, New Jersey.

On March 17, 2020, Reed's sister, Allison announced on her social media that their brother, Chris, had suddenly died in Detroit, Michigan, on March 14, 2020, due to cardiac arrest. President of the JSF, Akihisa Nagashima paid tribute to him: "I am absolutely stunned by the sad news. I would like to offer my deepest appreciation to Chris Reed for his contribution to Japanese ice dancing over the years and extend condolences to his family. May Mr. Reed rest in peace."

A memorial service was held at a Michigan funeral home on March 21, 2020, and was publicly live-streamed on numerous platforms. Reed paid tribute to him in both Japanese and English: "I miss your voice. I miss your big smile. I miss holding your hand. But I'll be strong for you, Chris."

At the 2022 NHK Trophy, Reed got to see her sister, Allison, whom she hadn't previously been able to see in over two years due to the COVID-19 pandemic.

== Career ==
Chris and Cathy Reed initially began with singles skating, before deciding to skate together when Cathy was 12. They approached Shae-Lynn Bourne and she became their coach, along with Nikolai Morozov, who choreographed their first program. They trained in Hackensack, New Jersey. The Reeds won the novice ice dancing title at the 2006 U.S. Championships. They decided to represent Japan beginning in the 2006–07 season. While novice national champions are usually given a chance to compete on the Junior Grand Prix, Cathy Reed was too old at the time of their win to compete as a junior internationally. The Reeds accepted an offer to compete for Japan, advancing immediately to the senior level.

After advancing to the senior level, they placed fourth at the 2006 Golden Spin of Zagreb, and second at the 2007 Japan Championships behind Nozomi Watanabe and Akiyuki Kido. At the 2007 Four Continents, they placed 7th, ahead of several teams who had been competing as seniors much longer.

Reed underwent knee surgery twice after tearing the meniscus in his knee, and later tearing the medial collateral ligament. He was off the ice for five months.

Making their Grand Prix debut, the Reeds placed 9th at the 2007 Skate America and 8th at the 2007 NHK Trophy. They won the Japanese national championships. They repeated their 7th-place finish at the Four Continents, and then placed 16th at the 2008 Worlds. They represented Japan at the 2010 Winter Olympics in Vancouver, finishing in 17th place. They won the silver medal at the 2011 Asian Winter Games.

The Reeds finished 5th at both the NHK Trophy and Skate America during the 2012–13 season. They were named in the Japanese team to the 2014 Winter Olympics in Sochi, and 2015 Worlds, where they finished outside the top 20.

== Coaching career ==
After the 2014–15 figure skating season, Reed retired from competitive figure skating and now works as a coach and choreographer; she coaches ice dance as well as skating skills for singles skaters. She is currently based at the Kinoshita Academy in Uji, Kyoto. She has spoken about the challenges of teaching ice dance in Japan, as there are relatively few rinks and singles skating is more popular, making it difficult for teams to find time on the ice to practice. As a choreographer, she takes inspiration from both Japanese and international dance and theater styles.

Her current and former students include:

- Japan Daiya Ebihara
- Japan Tomoki Hiwatashi
- Japan Marin Honda
- Japan Sumika Kanazawa
- JapanAyumi Katogani / Lucas Tsuyoshi Honda
- Japan Mana Kawabe
- Japan Nao Kida / Masaya Morita
- Japan Mariko Kihara
- Japan Rika Kihira
- Japan Yuto Kishina
- Riria Kono
- Ikura Kushida
- Ikura Kushida / Koshiro Shimada
- Satoko Miyahara
- Sumitada Moriguchi
- Ryoga Morimoto
- Haruna Murakami
- Yuna Nagaoka / Sumitada Moriguchi
- Shunsuke Nakamura
- Haruya Sasaki
- Ayumi Shibayama
- Mao Shimada
- Sae Shimizu
- Sae Shimizu / Lucas Tsuyoshi Honda
- Yuna Shiraiwa
- Rion Sumiyoshi
- Sena Takahashi
- Lucas Tsuyoshi Honda
- Rinka Watanabe
- Kei Yamada
- Hana Yoshida
- Utana Yoshida / Masaya Morita

== Programs ==
(with Chris Reed)

Season	Short dance	Free dance	Exhibition
2014–2015	Flamenco: El Cid: Farruca by Thomas Hickstein, Elva La Guardia; Paso Doble: Gato Montes by Hugo Montenegro	Moon River; Mr. Lucky; The Big Blow Out by Henry Mancini	River Flows in You by Yiruma
2013–2014	Quickstep: Puttin' On the Ritz by Irving Berlin; Foxtrot: Harlem Nocturne by Earle Hagen; Quickstep: Puttin' On the Ritz by Irving Berlin	Ona Hei (from Total War: Shogun 2) by Jeff van Dyck; Bitter Sweet Water (from Hell Girl Mitsuganae) by Hiromi Mizutani; Good Death; Ona Hei (from Total War: Shogun 2) by Jeff van Dyck	The Prayer by Celine Dion and Andrea Bocelli; Onmyoji by Shigeru Umebayashi
2012–2013	Seven Brides for Seven Brothers: June Bride; Barn Dance	The Beatles: Golden Slumbers; Carry that Weight; The End	The Prayer by Celine Dion and Andrea Bocelli
2011–2012	La Llama by Chris Ice; Whatever Happens by Michael Jackson; Drums by Basic J	Chale Chalo (from Lagaan) by A. R. Rahman; Mon Amour by David Visan; Chale Chalo (from Lagaan) by A. R. Rahman	
2010–2011	The Addams Family: by Marc Shaiman: Party ... For Me?; The Tango	Just for a Little While by Smokin' Joe Kubek Band; Ain't No Sunshine by Al Jarreau; Think by Aretha Franklin (from The Blues Brothers)	
	Original dance		
2009–2010	Japanese: Sakura; Kodo	Angels & Demons by Joshua Bell, Hans Zimmer	
2008–2009	Charleston: Money, Money (from Cabaret soundtrack)	Il Mirto E La Rosa by Alessandro Safina	
2007–2008	Zorba the Greek by Mikis Theodorakis	Prayer in the Night (Suite No. 4 by George Frideric Handel modern arrangement)	
2006–2007	Tango Jalousie; Libertango by Astor Piazzolla	Prayer in the Night (Suite No. 4 by George Frideric Handel modern arrangement)	
2005–2006		Concierto de Aranjuez by Joaquín Rodrigo	

== Competitive highlights ==
=== With Chris Reed for Japan ===
Results
International
Event	2006–07	2007–08	2008–09	2009–10	2010–11	2011–12	2012–13	2013–14	2014–15
Olympics				17th				21st	
Worlds		16th	16th	15th	13th	24th	20th	18th	22nd
Four Continents	7th	7th	WD				7th		
GP NHK Trophy		8th	8th	7th	7th	7th	5th	6th	6th
GP Skate America		9th			7th			5th	
Golden Spin	4th			5th					
Nebelhorn						4th			
NRW Trophy							2nd		
Toruń Cup							2nd		
Asian Games					2nd				
National
Japan Champ.	2nd	1st	1st	1st	1st	WD	1st	1st	1st
Team events
Olympics								5th T	
World Team; Trophy			3rd T 5th P			1st T 6th P	3rd T 4th P		3rd T 6th P
GP = Grand Prix; WD = Withdrew; T = Team result; P = Personal result; Medals awarded for team result only.

=== With Chris Reed for the United States ===
National
Event	2003–04	2004–05	2005–06
U.S. Championships			1st N.
Eastern Sectionals	10th N.	5th N.	1st N.
North Atlantic Regionals		1st N.	
N. = Novice level
