= Coupe du Printemps =

Figure skating competition in Luxembourg

- Status: Active
- Genre: International competition
- Frequency: Annual
- Location: Kockelscheuer
- Country: Luxembourg
- Organiser: Luxembourg Figure Skating Union

The Coupe du Printemps is an annual figure skating competition held in March in Kockelscheuer, Luxembourg. Skaters compete in men's singles and women's singles at the senior, junior, and novice levels, although not every discipline is held every year due to a lack of participants. The event is organized by the Luxembourg Figure Skating Union (French: Union Luxembourgeoise de Patinage), the sport's national governing body. The event also serves as the Luxembourgish Figure Skating Championships.

== Senior medalists ==
=== Men's singles ===
Men's event medalists
Year	Gold	Silver	Bronze	Ref.
2012	(Belgium) Jorik Hendrickx	(Romania) Zoltán Kelemen	(Germany) Franz Streubel	
2013	(Belgium) Jorik Hendrickx	(Japan) Tatsuki Machida	(Romania) Zoltán Kelemen	
2014	(Japan) Daisuke Murakami	(Japan) Ryuju Hino	(France) Charles Tetar	
2015	(Japan) Daisuke Murakami	(France) Kévin Aymoz	(Germany) Alexander Bjelde	
2016	(Belgium) Jorik Hendrickx	(Kazakhstan) Denis Ten	(Japan) Takahito Mura	
2017	(Japan) Shoma Uno	(Japan) Takahito Mura	(Armenia) Slavik Hayrapetyan	
2018	(Sweden) Alexander Majorov	(Japan) Kazuki Tomono	(France) Romain Ponsart	
2019	(Japan) Sena Miyake	(Monaco) Davide Lewton Brain	(Austria) Maurizio Zandron	
2020	Competition cancelled due to the COVID-19 pandemic			
2021	Competition cancelled due to the COVID-19 pandemic			
2022	(Japan) Kazuki Tomono	(Japan) Tatsuya Tsuboi	(France) Landry Le May	
2023	(United States) Jimmy Ma	(Japan) Koshiro Shimada	(Canada) Matthew Newnham	
2024	(Kazakhstan) Dias Jirenbayev	(France) Corentin Spinar	(Spain) Pablo García	
2025	(France) François Pitot	(France) Corentin Spinar	(France) Ilia Gogitidze	
2026	(United States) Daniel Martynov	(Japan) Kazuki Tomono	(Japan) Nozomu Yoshioka	

=== Women's singles ===
Women's event medalists
Year	Gold	Silver	Bronze	Ref.
2012	(Germany) Sarah Hecken	(Italy) Francesca Rio	(France) Maé-Bérénice Méité	
2013	(Sweden) Joshi Helgesson	(Germany) Nathalie Weinzierl	(Japan) Risa Shōji	
2014	(Japan) Mariko Kihara	(Norway) Anine Rabe	(Switzerland) Myriam Leuenberger	
2015	(Sweden) Joshi Helgesson	(Japan) Riona Kato	(Germany) Nicole Schott	
2016	(Sweden) Joshi Helgesson	(Japan) Rin Nitaya	(Italy) Giada Russo	
2017	(Japan) Rika Hongo	(Latvia) Angelīna Kučvaļska	(Hungary) Ivett Tóth	
2018	(Japan) Mai Mihara	(Japan) Kaori Sakamoto	(Japan) Yuna Shiraiwa	
2019	(Sweden) Josefin Taljegård	(Netherlands) Caya Scheepens	(United Kingdom) Bethany Powell	
2020	Competition cancelled due to the COVID-19 pandemic			
2021	Competition cancelled due to the COVID-19 pandemic			
2022	(Japan) Rinka Watanabe	(Japan) Rion Sumiyoshi	(New Zealand) Jocelyn Hong	
2023	(Japan) Mone Chiba	(United States) Starr Andrews	(United States) Ava Ziegler	
2024	(Estonia) Eva-Lotta Kiibus	(United Kingdom) Kristen Spours	(Slovakia) Ema Doboszova	
2025	(Estonia) Eva-Lotta Kiibus	(Italy) Ginevra Lavinia Negrello	(Netherlands) Niki Wories	
2026	(Japan) Mana Kawabe	(Japan) Rinka Watanabe	(Italy) Marina Piredda	

=== Pairs ===
Pairs event medalists
Year	Gold	Silver	Bronze	Ref.
2013	(Ukraine) Elizaveta Usmantseva / Roman Talan	(Belarus) Maria Paliakova / Nikita Bochkov	(Sweden) Ronja Roll / Gustav Forsgren	

== Junior medalists ==
=== Men's singles ===
Junior men's event medalists
Year	Gold	Silver	Bronze	Ref.
2012	(France) Alexi Dalrymple	(France) Simon Hocquaux	(Italy) Antonio Panfili	
2013	(France) Simon Hocquaux	(France) Charles Tetar	(Japan) Sei Kawahara	
2014	(Japan) Sota Yamamoto	(Germany) Panagiotis Polizoakis	(Japan) Taichi Honda	
2015	(France) Adrien Tesson	(Japan) Kazuki Tomono	(Italy) Marco Zandron	
2016	(Canada) Antony Cheng	(Sweden) Nikolaj Majorov	(Canada) Conrad Orzel	
2017	(Japan) Yuto Kishina	(Japan) Tatsuya Tsuboi	(Switzerland) David Gouveia	
2018	(Japan) Tatsuya Tsuboi	(Japan) Kazuki Hasegawa	(Sweden) Nikolaj Majorov	
2019	(Czech Republic) Filip Scerba	(France) Tom Bouvart	(France) Theo Belle	
2020	Competition cancelled due to the COVID-19 pandemic			
2021	Competition cancelled due to the COVID-19 pandemic			
2022	(Spain) Pablo Garcia	(Germany) Denis Gurdzhi	(Germany) Tim England	
2023	(United States) Jacob Sanchez	(Japan) Seigo Tauchi	(Japan) Tsudoi Suto	
2024	(Switzerland) Damien Eckstein	(Spain) André Zapata	(Switzerland) Aurélian Chervet	
2025	(Kazakhstan) Artur Smagulov	(France) Sylvain Ritchie	(Switzerland) Sandro de Angelo	
2026	(United States) Caleb Farrington	(United States) Zachary Lopinto	(Italy) Matteo Marchioni	

=== Women's singles ===
Junior women's event medalists
Year	Gold	Silver	Bronze	Ref.
2012	(Italy) Giada Russo	(Germany) Anne Zetzsche	(Sweden) Josefin Taljegard	
2013	(Japan) Riona Kato	(Finland) Liubov Efimenko	(Finland) Nelma Hede	
2014	(Japan) Yura Matsuda	(France) Lola Esbrat	(Switzerland) Shaline Ruegger	
2015	(Finland) Anni Järvenpää	(Netherlands) Kyarha van Tiel	(Belgium) Loena Hendrickx	
2016	(Sweden) Cassandra Johansson	(Sweden) Anita Östlund	(Canada) Maya Lappin	
2017	(Japan) Rino Kasakake	(Estonia) Annely Vahi	(Italy) Chenny Paolucci	
2018	(Austria) Olga Mikutina	(Italy) Alessia Tornaghi	(Finland) Linnea Ceder	
2019	(Japan) Rinka Watanabe	(Finland) Mai Helske	(Netherlands) Lenne Van Gorp	
2020	Competition cancelled due to the COVID-19 pandemic			
2021	Competition cancelled due to the COVID-19 pandemic			
2022	(Japan) Ami Nakai	(Belgium) Nina Pinzarrone	(Hungary) Vivien Papp	
2023	(Japan) Ami Nakai	(Japan) Yo Takagi	(Canada) Aleksa Volkova	
2024	(Switzerland) Leandra Tzimpoukakis	(Switzerland) Eugenia Sekulovski	(Finland) Lotta Artimo	
2025	(Finland) Karina Innos	(Finland) Annika Pellonmaa	(Switzerland) Eugenia Sekulovski	
2026	(Belgium) Lilou Remeysen	(Uzbekistan) Elizaveta Grashchenkova	(Netherlands) Lucca Dijkhuizen	

=== Pairs ===
Junior pairs event medalists
Year	Gold	Silver	Bronze	Ref.
2013	(Russia) Lina Fedorova / Maxim Miroshkin	(Russia) Arina Cherniavskaia / Antonio Souza-Kordeyru	(Italy) Alessandra Cernuschi / Filippo Ambrosini	

== Luxembourgish Figure Skating Championships ==
Luxembourgish Figure Skating Championships
- Status: Active
- Genre: National championships
- Frequency: Annual
- Location: Kockelscheuer
- Country: Luxembourg
- Organiser: Luxembourg Figure Skating Union

=== Senior medalists ===
==== Women's singles ====
Year	Gold	Silver	Bronze	Ref.
2004	Anna Bernauer	Fleur Maxwell	Florence Lux	
2005	Fleur Maxwell	Florence Lux	Anna Bernauer	
2014	Fleur Maxwell	No other competitors		
2015	Fleur Maxwell	No other competitors		
2025	No women's competitors			
2026	No women's competitors			

=== Junior medalists ===
==== Women's singles ====
Junior women's event medalists
Year	Gold	Silver	Bronze	Ref.
2012				
2013				
2014				
2015				
2016				
2017				
2018				
2019				
2020	Competition cancelled due to the COVID-19 pandemic			
2021	Competition cancelled due to the COVID-19 pandemic			
2022				
2023				
2024	Ysaline Hibon	Rebecca Toft	No other competitors	
2025	Dita Giltaire	Eliska Philippe	No other competitors	
2026	Dita Giltaire	No other competitors		
