= Daichi Miyata =

Japanese figure skater

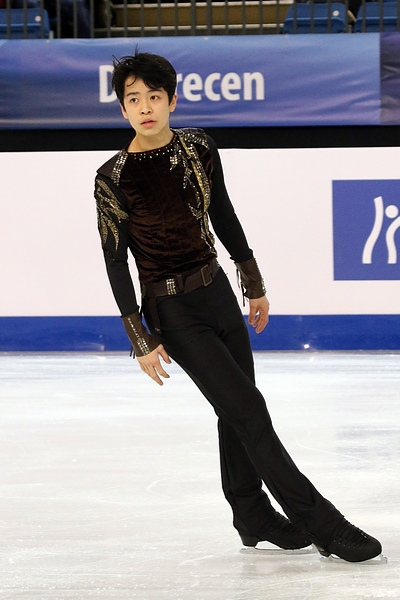

Personal information
- Native name: 宮田 大地
- Born: July 14, 1996 (age 30) Ōnojō, Fukuoka Prefecture, Japan
- Height: 1.71 m (5 ft 7 1/2 in)

Figure skating career
- Country: Japan
- Coach: Naoki Shigematsu
- Skating club: Hosei University, Tokyo
- Began skating: 2003

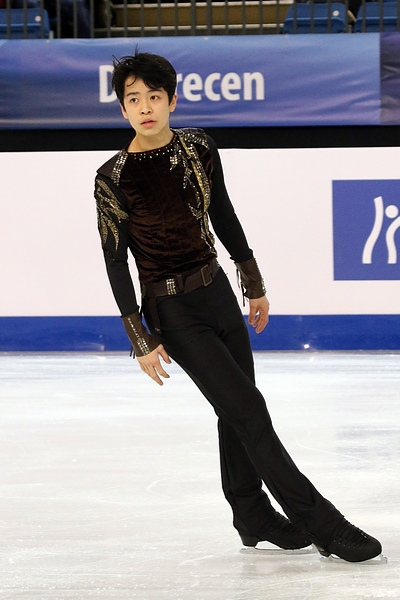
Daichi Miyata at 2016 World Junior Figure Skating Championships

Daichi Miyata (Japanese: 宮田 大地, born July 14, 1996) is a Japanese former figure skater. He won the bronze medal at the 2015–16 Japan Junior Championships and was selected to compete at the 2016 World Junior Championships in Debrecen. In Hungary, he qualified for the final segment in 19th place and finished 18th overall.

== Programs ==
Season	Short program	Free skating
2016–17	Schindler's List by John Williams choreo. by Eiji Iwamoto	Pearl Harbor by Hans Zimmer choreo. by Eiji Iwamoto
2015–16	Schindler's List by John Williams choreo. by Eiji Iwamoto	Braveheart by James Horner choreo. by Natalia Bestemianova, Igor Bobrin

== Competitive highlights ==
CS: Challenger Series; JGP: Junior Grand Prix

International
Event	06–07	07–08	08–09	09–10	10–11	11–12	12–13	13–14	14–15	15–16	16–17
CS Nepela Memorial											10th
International: Junior
Junior Worlds										18th	
JGP Croatia										6th	
JGP Slovakia										6th	
Challenge Cup									4th J		
National
Japan									11th	10th	
Japan Junior					19th	19th			5th	3rd	
Japan Novice	15th B	5th B	22nd A	3rd A							
J = Junior level
