= Rin Nitaya =

Japanese figure skater

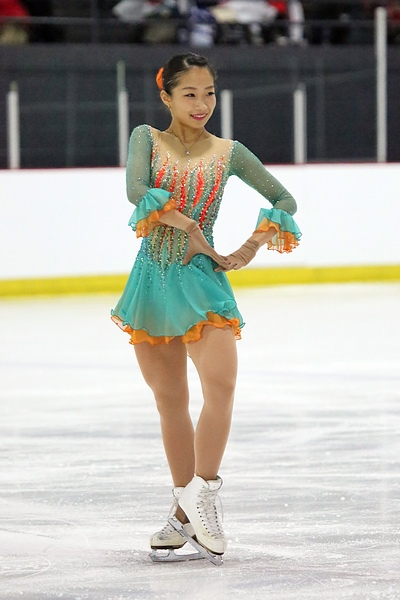
- Nitaya at the 2017 Autumn Classic International

Personal information
- Native name: 新田谷凜
- Born: August 8, 1997 (age 29) Nishinomiya, Hyōgo Prefecture, Japan
- Home town: Nagoya, Japan
- Height: 155 cm (5 ft 1 in)

Figure skating career
- Country: Japan
- Discipline: Women's skating
- Coach: Machiko Yamada; Mihoko Higuchi
- Skating club: Chukyo University
- Began skating: 2006
- Retired: 2021
Medal record
Representing Japan
Figure skating: Ladies' singles
Winter Universiade
Silver medal – second place	2017 Almaty	Ladies' singles

Rin Nitaya (Japanese: 新田谷 凜, born August 8, 1997) is a Japanese former figure skater. She is the 2017 Winter Universiade silver medalist, 2015 Gardena Spring Trophy champion, and 2016 Coupe du Printemps silver medalist.

== Personal life ==
Nitaya was born in Nishinomiya, Hyōgo Prefecture, Japan, and she has an elder brother.

She graduated from the Chukyo University School of Sports Science. She now works in insurance sales.

== Career ==
Nitaya debuted in international competitions in 2013 at the Gardena Spring Trophy, winning silver in the junior women's category.

=== 2014–15 season ===
In the 2014–15 season, Nitaya debuted on the ISU Junior Grand Prix (JGP) circuit, winning silver in Courchevel, France. She placed fourth at her second JGP assignment, in Tallinn, Estonia. Concluding her season, she won her first senior international medal – gold at the Gardena Spring Trophy.

=== 2015–16 season ===
Competing in the 2015–16 JGP series, Nitaya finished fourth in Bratislava, Slovakia and won the bronze medal in Toruń, Poland. In November, she placed 4th at the 2015–16 Japanese Junior Championships.

Nitaya won the senior silver medal at the 2016 Coupe du Printemps.

She originally intended this to be her last season competing as a junior, but her coach encouraged her to spend one more season competing on the Junior Grand Prix circuit.

=== 2016–17 season ===
At the beginning of the season, Nitaya said that she had worked on improving her expressiveness. She also expressed that the junior level required a higher technical level than the senior one, as the solo jump in the short program was of a proscribed type, while the program composition was more flexible for senior skaters. The junior time limit was also shorter, meaning that elements had to be performed in quicker succession. At her first junior Grand Prix event, she won the bronze medal. At her second, she placed 4th.

In February 2017, Nitaya won the silver medal at the 2017 Winter Universiade in Almaty, Kazakhstan. She ranked third in the short program and second in the free skate, finishing second to Elena Radionova. During her free skate, she singled a planned triple Lutz jump, the most valuable jump in her program, and was able to replace a planned triple Salchow jump later in her program with a successful triple Lutz to gain back some of the points she had lost.

=== 2017–2018 season ===
Nitaya at the 2017 Autumn Classic International

Nitaya competed at the 2017 Autumn Classic International, where she placed 6th. At the 2017 Japan Championships, she finished in 12th place.

=== 2018–2019 season ===
Nitaya moved clubs from her longtime Kuniwa Club to the Grand Prix Tokai club. She also began focusing on the choreography of her programs as a whole rather than simply landing her jumps. She placed 28th at the 2018 Japan Figure Skating Championships, her worst-ever result there. She later described this season as one that was "difficult from start to finish" and said she had no longer enjoyed skating during it.

=== 2019–2020 season ===
At the 2019 Japan Championships, Nitaya finished in 7th place, her personal best at the national championships, which she attributed to a new mindset of trying to enjoy skating and knowing she had decided to retire when the season ended. Afterward, she planned to compete at the Intercollegiate Championships in January, but she fractured her foot in training and had to withdraw. Her final competition was planned to be the Aichi Prefecture Championships in February, which she did not enter; the Championships were also postponed due to the COVID-19 pandemic.

Nitaya originally intended to retire after this season and move away from skating. However, in February, she announced her intention to continue after graduating from university.

=== 2020–2021 season ===
Nitaya worked part-time at a restaurant while training. After receiving feedback from national judges that she spent too long setting up her jumps, she worked on shortening her approach to jumps in order to raise her scores.

At the 2020 Japan Championships, she placed 5th in the short program and dropped to 10th overall after the free skate. During the off season, she toured with Stars on Ice. Nitaya again decided to retire after competing for one more season.

=== 2021–2022 season ===
Nitaya suffered from equipment issues; the blade of her skate cracked shortly before the Chubu regional championships, and her replacement gear did not fit. She placed 11th in the short program at the West Japan sectional championships, but after encouragement from her brother and other family members, she skated well enough in the free skate to rise to 9th place overall, which qualified her to the 2021 Japan Championships. At the Japan Championships, in the short program, she fell on her opening jump, and her combination consisted of only two double jumps. She expressed deep frustration while crying over her results. She placed 29th and did not advance to the free skate.

== Programs ==
Season	Short program	Free skating	Exhibition
2021–2022	The Red Violin by John Corigliano choreo. by Mihoko Higuchi	Black Swan by Clint Mansell choreo. by Mihoko Higuchi	
2020–2021	The Red Violin by John Corigliano choreo. by Mihoko Higuchi	Black Swan by Clint Mansell choreo. by Mihoko Higuchi	
2019–2020	The Red Violin by John Corigliano choreo. by Mihoko Higuchi	Exogenesis: Symphony Part 3 (Redemption) by Muse choreo. by Mihoko Higuchi	
2018–2019	Devil's Trill Sonata by Giuseppe Tartini choreo. by Mihoko Higuchi	Exogenesis: Symphony Part 3 (Redemption) by Muse choreo. by Mihoko Higuchi	
2017–2018			
2016–2017	The Red Violin by John Corigliano choreo. by Akiko Suzuki	Legends of the Fall by James Horner choreo. by Akiko Suzuki	
2015–2016	Concierto de Aranjuez by Joaquín Rodrigo choreo. by Akiko Suzuki	Romeo and Juliet by Henry Mancini choreo. by Miho Kawaume	
2014–2015	Por una cabeza by Carlos Gardel choreo. by Miho Kawaume	Romeo and Juliet by Henry Mancini choreo. by Miho Kawaume	In the Mood by Glenn Miller; Sing, Sing, Sing (with a Swing) by Benny Goodman

== Competitive highlights ==
CS: Challenger Series; JGP: Junior Grand Prix

International
Event	10–11	11–12	12–13	13–14	14–15	15–16	16–17	17–18	18–19	19–20	20–21	21–22
CS Autumn Classic								6th				
CS Ondrej Nepela									9th			
Universiade							2nd					
Gardena					1st							
Printemps						2nd						
International: Junior or novice
JGP Estonia					4th		4th					
JGP France					2nd		3rd					
JGP Poland						3rd						
JGP Slovakia						4th						
Asian Trophy					3rd J							
Gardena			2nd J									
National
Japan			10th		13th	8th	11th	12th	28th	7th	10th	29th
Japan Junior	13th	13th	5th	9th	8th	4th						
