= 2012–13 Japan Figure Skating Championships =

Figure skating competition

- Type: National championship
- Date: December 20–24, 2012 (S); November 17–18, 2012 (J)
- Season: 2012–13
- Location: Sapporo (S); Nishitōkyō, Tokyo (J)
- Venue: Makomanai Ice Arena (S); DyDo Drinco Ice Arena (J)

Champions
- Men's singles: Yuzuru Hanyu (S); Ryujyu Hino (J)
- Ladies' singles: Mao Asada (S); Satoko Miyahara (J)
- Ice dance: Cathy Reed / Chris Reed (S); Nana Sugiki / Hiroichi Noguchi (J)
- Previous: 2011–12 Japan Championships
- Next: 2013–14 Japan Championships

The 2012–13 Japan Figure Skating Championships took place on December 20–24, 2012 at the Makomanai Ice Arena in Sapporo. It was the 81st edition of the event. Medals were awarded in the disciplines of men's singles, ladies' singles and ice dancing. No pairs competition was held this year.

== Results ==
=== Men ===
Rank	Name	Club	Total points	SP		FS	
1	Yuzuru Hanyu		285.23	1	97.68	2	187.55
2	Daisuke Takahashi	KANSAI UNIV SKATING CLUB	280.40	2	88.04	1	192.36
3	Takahito Mura		242.70	4	84.58	4	158.22
4	Nobunari Oda	KANSAI UNIV SKATING CLUB	240.56	5	80.75	3	159.81
5	Takahiko Kozuka	Toyota Motor	228.56	3	84.58	7	143.98
6	Kento Nakamura	St. Paul's	226.64	6	76.54	5	150.10
7	Keiji Tanaka		208.52	11	62.54	6	145.98
8	Akio Sasaki	Meiji Univ	208.52	7	74.92	10	133.60
9	Tatsuki Machida	KANSAI UNIV SKATING CLUB	206.17	8	68.48	8	137.69
10	Ryuju Hino	Chukyo Senior High School	202.30	9	68.28	9	134.02
11	Shoma Uno	Grand Prix Tokai Club	199.03	10	67.56	11	131.07
12	Ryuichi Kihara		184.14	12	58.07	12	126.07
13	Tomoyuki Koriyama		168.09	14	55.87	13	112.22
14	Taichi Honda	kansai univ.jhs.shs sc	164.84	15	55.58	14	110.20
15	Yukihiro Yoshida		155.33	17	53.02	15	109.43
16	Yoji Tsuboi		149.01	16	54.40	16	106.41
17	Sei Kawahara	Keio University	148.42	19	52.10	19	103.26
18	Daisuke Iwozaki	DOSHISHA F.SKATING CLUB	154.33	18	52.92	21	101.41
19	Koshin Yamada	KANSAI UNIV SKATING CLUB	145.49	21	50.41	18	103.36
20	Eiki Hattori	Hosei	153.05	20	51.03	20	102.02
21	Yuta Onuma	Nihon Univ	152.32	22	48.33	17	103.99
22	Kosuke Nozoe	Meiji Univ	143.68	13	55.94	23	87.74
23	Jo Matsumura	Meiji Univ	137.14	23	47.55	22	89.59
24	Masato Kimura	Hachinohe GOLD F･S･C	115.97	24	42.66	24	76.73
Free skating not reached
25	Ryo Norimatsu			25	38.22		
26	Ryoichi Eguchi			26	38.10		
27	Masaki Kondo			27	37.40		
WD	Yuki Horinouchi	Nihon Univ					
WD	Daisuke Murakami	yoshindo					

=== Ladies ===
Rank	Name	Club	Total points	SP		FS	
1	Mao Asada	Chukyo University	193.56	2	62.81	1	130.75
2	Kanako Murakami	Chukyo Senior High School	183.67	5	57.26	2	126.41
3	Satoko Miyahara	kansai univ.jhs.shs sc	180.55	3	60.19	3	120.36
4	Akiko Suzuki	Howa sports landSkateclub	180.03	1	65.09	5	114.94
5	Rika Hongo	AMC Mizuho High School	172.43	6	56.61	4	115.82
6	Riona Kato	KANSAI SKATING CLUB	167.62	7	54.88	6	112.74
7	Yuki Nishino	Meiji Univ	162.63	4	58.83	9	104.10
8	Yura Matsuda		160.30	12	51.29	7	109.01
9	Satsuki Muramoto	KANSAI UNIV SKATING CLUB	158.47	8	53.63	8	104.84
10	Rin Nitaya		146.93	9	53.49	11	93.44
11	Miyabi Oba	Chukyo Senior High School	143.89	23	42.43	10	101.66
12	Risa Shoji		143.19	14	50.45	12	92.74
13	Kako Tomotaki		140.10	11	51.75	14	88.35
14	Haruka Imai		137.92	18	47.30	13	90.62
15	Miyu Nakashio		137.36	13	50.50	17	86.86
16	Kana Muramoto	KANSAI UNIV SKATING CLUB	135.08	17	47.49	16	87.59
17	Saya Ueno		134.67	15	48.29	18	88.36
18	Yukiko Fujisawa		134.31	19	46.31	15	88.08
19	Mari Suzuki	Tohoku Fukushi University	132.07	16	47.75	20	84.32
20	Ayaka Hosoda	OSAKA SKATING CLUB	130.00	22	43.84	19	86.16
21	Mutsumi Takayama	Meiji Univ	121.60	10	52.75	23	68.85
22	Hikaru Nasuno		121.32	21	44.59	24	76.73
23	Shion Kokobun	KANSAI UNIV SKATING CLUB	114.67	20	46.09	22	68.88
24	Saya Suzuki	KYOTO DAIGO FSC	107.79	24	41.90	24	67.89
Free skating not reached
25	Mio Suzuki	KEIO SFC SKATING CLUB		25	40.74		
26	Shoko Ishikawa	Meiji Univ		26	40.56		
27	Mai Hirono	Chukyo Senior High School		27	39.39		
28	Nana Matsushina			28	39.30		
29	Yuka Touyama			29	38.27		
30	Yuka Kouno			30	37.40		

=== Ice dancing ===
Rank	Name	Club	Total points	SP		FS	
1	Cathy Reed / Chris Reed	KINOSHITA CLUB	133.92	1	53.41	1	80.51
2	Emi Hirai / Marien de la Asuncion	KANSAI UNIV SKATING CLUB	110.31	3	42.00	2	68.31
3	Burina Oi / Taiyo Mizutani	Juujou FSC	99.32	2	42.12	4	57.20
4	Misato Komatsubara / Kaoru Tsuji	Hosei/KYOTO AQUARENA SC	92.17	4	34.27	3	57.90

== Japan Junior Figure Skating Championships ==
The 2012–13 Junior Championships took place on November 17–18, 2012 at the DyDo Drinco Ice Arena in Nishitōkyō, Tokyo.

=== Men ===
Rank	Name	Club	Total points	SP		FS	
1	Ryuju Hino	Chukyo Senior High School	209.85	1	71.35	1	138.50
2	Shoma Uno	Grand Prix Tokai Club	190.58	2	66.21	2	124.37
3	Keiji Tanaka		189.46	3	65.21	3	124.25
4	Sota Yamamoto		159.61	11	47.32	4	112.29
5	Sei Kawahara		157.51	8	50.25	5	107.26
6	Taichi Honda	kansai univ.jhs.shs sc	155.76	6	51.57	6	104.19
7	Taichiro Yamakuma		150.44	7	51.29	9	99.15
8	Shu Nakamura	KANSAI UNIV HOKUYO HS	149.82	4	53.13	10	96.69
9	Takaha Hashizume		149.46	10	49.46	8	99.60
10	Kazuki Tomono	UENOSHIBA SKATE CLUB	144.90	20	40.91	7	103.99
11	Kento Kajita	meidaifuzokunakanokoko	137.09	9	50.18	14	86.91
12	Ryuta Katada	Orion FSC	136.39	13	40.19	11	92.14
13	Hiroaki Satou		135.86	5	53.09	19	82.77
14	Naoki Oda	kansai univ.jhs.shs sc	135.45	14	43.62	12	91.83
15	Hidetsugu Yamata		129.93	17	41.48	13	88.09
16	Kohei Yoshino	OSAKA SKATING CLUB	129.20	15	43.44	16	85.66
17	Yoji Nakano	Kanagawa FSC	129.89	16	42.53	15	85.66
18	Kosuke Nakano		127.32	11	44.48	18	82.84
19	Keiichiro Sasahara	OSAKA SKATING CLUB	124.26	19	40.94	17	83.32
20	Takumi Yamamoto	OSAKA SKATING CLUB	122.28	18	41.21	20	81.07
21	Naoya Watanabe		117.05	24	39.12	21	77.93
22	Taiga Aoki	NAMIHAYA ISC	114.39	21	40.20	22	74.19
23	Kanata Mori		111.78	22	39.96	23	71.82
24	Keisuke Kobayashi		98.10	23	39.65	24	58.45
Free skating not reached
25	Hiroki Hondo			25	39.03		
26	Reo Ishizuka	SEIBU HIGASHIFUSHIMI		26	38.29		
27	Kento Kobayashi			27	38.26		
28	Takahiro Ozone			28	36.94		
29	Masataka Nakajima	Nihon Univ		29	33.96		

=== Ladies ===
Rank	Name	Club	Total points	SP		FS	
1	Satoko Miyahara	kansai univ.jhs.shs sc	172.68	1	61.31	1	111.37
2	Riona Kato	KANSAI SKATING CLUB	161.47	5	53.90	2	107.57
3	Rika Hongo	KANSAI SKATING CLUB	159.34	3	55.47	3	103.87
4	Yura Matsuda		156.07	4	54.07	5	102.00
5	Rin Nitaya		157.51	8	48.97	4	103.27
6	Miyabi Oba	Chukyo Senior High School	144.01	2	56.61	12	87.40
7	Wakaba Higuchi		143.08	6	51.20	9	91.88
8	Mai Mihara		140.14	11	47.53	8	92.61
9	Kaori Sakamoto		139.52	13	46.56	7	92.96
10	Mariko Kihara	KYOTO DAIGO FSC	149.46	15	44.94	6	93.98
11	Mei Ito	Nihonbashi Jogakkan	135.89	10	47.67	11	88.22
12	Ami Dobashi		134.41	9	48.55	14	85.86
13	Rika Oya		131.08	20	43.99	13	87.09
14	Hinano Isobe	RITUMEIKANUJIJr HISCHOOL	130.16	24	41.67	10	88.49
15	Yuka Kito	SEIBU HIGASHIFUSHIMI	129.77	16	44.89	15	84.88
16	Haruna Suzuki	Shinyokohama prince club	127.70	7	49.57	19	79.13
17	Yoka Sakai	Grand Prix Tokai Club	125.87	14	46.19	16	79.68
18	Yuka Nagai		125.07	12	46.72	18	78.35
19	Hina Takeno		123.29	19	44.00	17	79.39
20	Ayana Yasuhara		118.52	17	44.49	20	74.03
21	Honoka Kawanishi		115.64	18	44.01	21	71.63
22	Mone Kawanishi	NAMIHAYA ISC	112.87	23	42.53	22	70.44
23	Satomi Akuzawa	Nihonbashi Jogakkan	105.53	21	43.43	24	62.10
24	Sakura Yamada	Aquapia SKATING CLUB	98.10	22	42.67	23	62.12
Free skating not reached
25	Hitomi Yaoita			25	40.39		
26	Asahi Sorakawa			26	39.43		
27	Mayako Matsuno	SEIBU HIGASHIFUSHIMI		27	38.45		
28	Mari Harumara			28	38.29		
29	Reia Funasako			29	36.57		
30	Kokoro Iwamoto	kansai univ.jhs.shs sc		30	33.11		

=== Ice dancing ===
Rank	Name	Club	Total points	SD		FD	
1	Nana Sugiki / Hiroichi Noguchi	Meiji Univ	87.58	1	34.44	1	53.14

== International team selections ==
=== World Championships ===
The Japanese team to the 2013 World Championships:

	Men	Ladies	Ice dancing
1	Yuzuru Hanyu	Mao Asada	Cathy Reed / Chris Reed
2	Takahito Mura	Kanako Murakami	
3	Daisuke Takahashi	Akiko Suzuki	
1st alt.	Nobunari Oda	Yuki Nishino	Emi Hirai / Marien de la Asuncion
2nd alt.	Takahiko Kozuka		

=== Four Continents Championships ===
The Japanese team to the 2013 Four Continents Championships:

	Men	Ladies	Ice dancing
1	Yuzuru Hanyu	Mao Asada	Cathy Reed / Chris Reed
2	Takahito Mura	Kanako Murakami	Emi Hirai / Marien de la Asuncion
3	Daisuke Takahashi	Akiko Suzuki	Bryna Oi / Taiyo Mizutani
1st alt.	Nobunari Oda	Rika Hongo	
2nd alt.	Takahiko Kozuka	Yuki Nishino	

=== World Junior Championships ===
The Japanese team to the 2013 World Junior Championships:

	Men	Ladies
1	Ryuju Hino	Rika Hongo
2	Keiji Tanaka	Satoko Miyahara
1st alt.	Shoma Uno	Riona Kato
