= 2013–14 Japan Figure Skating Championships =

Figure skating competition

- Type: National championship
- Date: December 20–23, 2013 (S); November 22–24, 2013 (J)
- Season: 2013–14
- Location: Saitama (S); Nagoya (J)
- Venue: Saitama Super Arena (S); Nippon Gaishi Sports Plaza (J)

Champions
- Men's singles: Yuzuru Hanyu (S); Keiji Tanaka (J)
- Ladies' singles: Akiko Suzuki (S); Rika Hongo (J)
- Pairs: Narumi Takahashi / Ryuichi Kihara (S); Sumire Suto / Konstantin Chizhikov (J)
- Ice dance: Cathy Reed / Chris Reed (S); Shizuru Agata / Kentaro Suzuki (J)
- Previous: 2012–13 Japan Championships
- Next: 2014–15 Japan Championships

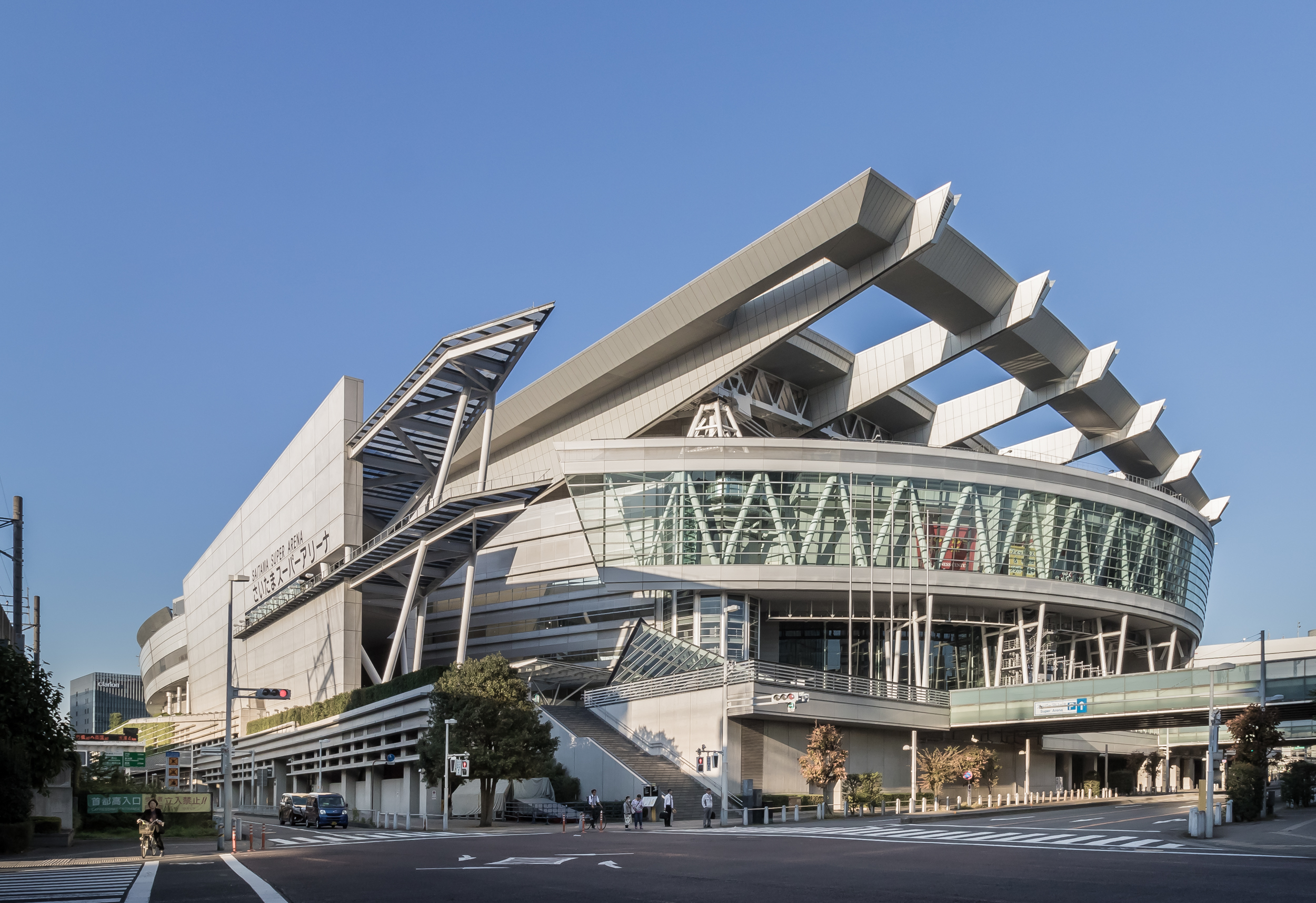
The Saitama Super Arena in 2000

The 2013–14 Japan Figure Skating Championships took place on December 20–23, 2013 at the Saitama Super Arena in Saitama. It was the 82nd edition of the event. Medals were awarded in the disciplines of men's singles, ladies' singles, pair skating, and ice dancing.

== Results ==
=== Men ===
Rank	Name	Club	Total points	SP		FS	
1	Yuzuru Hanyu	ANA	297.80	1	103.10	1	194.70
2	Tatsuki Machida	KANSAI UNIV SKATING CLUB	277.04	2	93.22	2	183.82
3	Takahiko Kozuka	Toyota Motor Corporation	264.81	3	90.70	4	174.11
4	Nobunari Oda	NSAI UNIV SKATING CLUB	256.47	5	77.72	3	178.75
5	Daisuke Takahashi	KANSAI UNIV SKATING CLUB	252.81	4	82.57	5	170.24
6	Takahito Mura		216.72	8	71.25	6	145.47
7	Shoma Uno	Chukyo Senior High School	216.49	6	72.15	7	144.34
8	Keiji Tanaka		211.52	7	71.78	10	139.74
9	Yoji Tsuboi		208.58	10	67.22	8	141.36
10	Daisuke Murakami	yoshindo	205.86	13	65.71	9	140.15
11	Kento Nakamura	St.Paul's	205.49	9	69.16	11	136.33
12	Ryujyu Hino		191.20	14	64.18	10	139.74
13	Akio Sasaki	Meiji Univ	188.38	12	65.73	13	122.65
14	Sota Yamamoto		170.62	11	65.90	19	104.72
15	Taichi Honda	kansai univ.jhs.shs sc	170.47	15	59.34	15	111.13
16	Koshin Yamada	KANSAI UNIV SKATING CLUB	161.37	19	49.89	14	111.48
17	Takuya Kondoh	Keio University	161.27	17	51.80	16	109.47
18	Daisuke Isozaki	DOSHISHA F.SKATING CLUB	158.77	18	51.62	18	107.15
19	Kosuke Nozoe	Meiji Univ	156.02	16	53.89	20	102.13
20	Kazuki Tomono	UENOSHIBA SKATE CLUB	155.30	20	47.98	17	107.32
21	Kohei Yoshino	KANSAI UNIV SKATING CLUB	136.14	21	47.90	24	88.24
22	Takumi Yamamoto		134.95	22	45.93	23	89.02
23	Masaki Kondo		134.57	23	43.16	22	91.41
24	Takaya Hashizume		133.68	24	42.10	21	91.58
Free skating not reached
25	Yuya Tamada	KYOTO AQUARENA SC		25	40.55		
26	Kota Tadano			26	38.38		
27	Ryoichi Eguchi			27	37.96		
28	Ryo Norimatsu			28	35.38		
29	Kento Suginaka	OSAKA SKATING CLUB		29	35.19		

=== Ladies ===
Rank	Name	Club	Total points	SP		FS	
1	Akiko Suzuki	Howa Sports Land Skate Club	215.18	2	70.19	1	144.99
2	Kanako Murakami	Chukyo Senior High School	202.52	3	67.42	2	135.10
3	Mao Asada		199.50	1	73.01	3	126.49
4	Satoko Miyahara	kansai univ.jhs.shs sc	191.58	4	66.52	5	125.06
5	Haruka Imai		186.16	6	60.63	4	125.53
6	Rika Hongo	AMC Mizuho High School	176.31	7	59.25	6	117.06
7	Miki Ando	Shinyokohama prince club	171.12	5	64.87	9	106.25
8	Mariko Kihara	KYOTO DAIGO FSC	160.10	8	56.35	10	103.75
9	Yura Matsuda		158.29	14	50.94	7	107.35
10	Miyabi Oba	Chukyo Senior High School	157.17	10	55.07	13	102.10
11	Miyu Nakashio		156.86	11	54.65	12	102.21
12	Mai Mihara		152.50	20	45.51	8	106.99
13	Riona Kato		152.37	13	53.72	14	98.65
14	Saya Ueno	KANSAI UNIV SKATING CLUB	151.92	12	54.27	15	97.65
15	Kaori Sakamoto		151.85	9	56.29	16	95.56
16	Ayaka Hosoda	KANSAI UNIV SKATING CLUB	151.24	18	47.86	11	103.38
17	Kana Muramoto	KANSAI UNIV SKATING CLUB	141.79	16	49.70	17	92.09
18	Yukiko Fujisawa		138.88	15	50.37	19	88.51
19	Kako Tomotaki		137.50	19	47.03	18	90.47
20	Kaho Komaki		136.24	17	48.71	21	87.53
21	Yuki Nishino	Meiji Univ	133.42	21	45.49	20	87.93
22	Shion Kokubun	KANSAI UNIV SKATING CLUB	131.51	23	45.16	22	86.35
23	Risa Shoji		127.50	22	45.43	23	82.07
24	Ayana Yasuhara		114.51	24	44.67	24	69.84
Free skating not reached
25	Saya Suzuki	KYOTO DAIGO FSC		25	44.11		
26	Sakura Yamada	Aquapia SKATING CLUB		26	43.45		
27	Ibuki Mori	Chukyo Senior High School		27	43.41		
28	Shiori Tanikawa	AomoriGOLD		28	41.83		
29	Mayuko Okamoto			29	41.10		
30	Mayu Yamamoto			30	39.58		

=== Pairs ===
Rank	Name	Club	Total points	SP		FS	
1	Narumi Takahashi / Ryuichi Kihara	KINOSHITA CLUB	149.48	1	54.62	1	94.86

=== Ice dancing ===
Rank	Name	Club	Total points	SP		FS	
1	Cathy Reed / Chris Reed	KINOSHITA CLUB	142.87	1	55.51	1	87.36
2	Emi Hirai / Marien de la Asuncion	KANSAI UNIV SKATING CLUB	134.98	2	53.01	2	81.97
3	Shizuru Agata / Kentaro Suzuki	naniwa senior high school / Meiji Univ	92.29	3	37.32	3	54.97
4	Chinatsu Nakazawa / Kokoro Mizutani	Shinyokohama prince club	76.47	4	31.27	4	45.20

== Japan Junior Figure Skating Championships ==
The 2013–14 Junior Championships took place on November 22–24, 2013 at the Nippon Gaishi Sports Plaza in Nagoya. Except for pairs, which took part along with the senior competition.

=== Men ===
Rank	Name	Club	Total points	SP		FS	
1	Keiji Tanaka		215.29	1	75.93	1	139.36
2	Shoma Uno		206.10	2	71.61	3	134.49
3	Ryujyu Hino		196.67	4	59.69	2	136.98
4	Taichi Honda		170.45	5	57.33	4	113.12
5	Sota Yamamoto		166.10	3	62.28	10	103.82
6	Kazuki Tomono		165.75	7	53.88	5	111.87
7	Sei Kawahara		164.94	6	57.06	8	107.88
8	Shu Nakamura		162.87	10	51.63	6	111.24
9	Tsunehito Karakawa		158.31	8	52.05	9	106.26
10	Hidetsugu Kamata		153.68	17	45.69	7	107.99
11	Hiroaki Satou		152.88	11	51.08	12	101.80
12	Kento Kobayashi		149.71	16	45.96	11	103.75
13	Naoya Watanabe		143.47	13	49.90	14	93.57
14	Yoji Nakano		141.65	12	50.09	16	91.56
15	Junsuke Tokikuni		138.05	21	43.33	13	94.72
16	Kotaro Takeuchi		137.07	15	47.04	17	90.02
17	Koshiro Shimada		136.88	19	44.50	15	92.38
18	Junya Watanabe		136.46	9	51.99	19	84.47
19	Ryoichi Yuasa		131.28	14	48.96	21	82.32
20	Tyo Sagami		128.75	24	42.61	18	86.14
21	Taichiro Yamakuma		126.61	22	43.09	20	83.52
22	Kousuke Nakano		125.88	18	45.45	23	80.43
23	Shion Kamada		124.88	20	44.25	22	80.63
24	Shoya Ichihashi		119.69	23	42.82	24	76.97
Free skating not reached
25	Keiichiro Sasahara			25	42.44		
26	Kazuki Kushida			26	41.75		
27	Naoki Oda			27	41.24		
28	Sena Miyake			28	40.25		

=== Ladies ===
Rank	Name	Club	Total points	SP		FS	
1	Rika Hongo		163.12	3	52.84	1	110.28
2	Mai Mihara		153.85	2	53.19	5	100.66
3	Yura Matsuda		151.61	4	51.57	7	100.04
4	Mariko Kihara		150.74	1	53.74	8	97.00
5	Marin Honda		150.05	13	45.81	2	104.24
6	Kaori Sakamoto		148.78	8	47.14	4	101.64
7	Riona Kato		147.33	14	45.28	3	102.05
8	Wakaba Higuchi		142.81	19	42.37	6	100.44
9	Rin Nitaya		140.76	7	47.72	12	93.04
10	Rika Oya		139.91	15	44.10	10	95.81
11	Mei Ito		139.75	12	46.08	11	93.67
12	Yuhana Yokoi		136.73	23	40.84	9	95.89
13	Miu Suzaki		136.73	6	48.25	14	88.48
14	Kokoro Iwamoto		134.22	10	46.52	15	87.70
15	Yuna Aoki		134.16	5	50.03	18	84.13
16	Hina Takeno		131.75	21	41.55	13	90.02
17	Miyu Nishizaka		129.60	11	46.26	19	88.48
18	Rei Sagami		127.67	20	41.84	16	85.83
19	Yuka Nagai		125.97	24	40.54	17	85.43
20	Emiri Nagata		124.79	9	46.97	22	77.82
21	Reimi Tsuboi		124.69	16	44.06	20	80.63
22	Mayako Matsuno		121.17	18	43.28	21	77.89
23	Mone Kawanishi		117.46	22	40.95	23	76.51
24	Reia Funasako		115.61	17	43.76	24	71.85
Free skating not reached
25	Ami Dobashi			25	40.36		
26	Eriko Yamakuma			26	40.11		
27	Haruna Suzuki			27	39.47		
28	Makika Saito			28	36.48		
29	Asuka Kaizu			29	34.09		

=== Pairs ===
Rank	Name	Club	Total points	SP		FS	
1	Sumire Suto / Konstantin Chizhikov		111.35	1	39.74	1	71.61
2	Ami Koga / Francis Boudreau-Audet		107.32	2	37.80	2	69.52

=== Ice dancing ===
Rank	Name	Club	Total points	SP		FS	
1	Shizuru Agata / Kentaro Suzuki		98.22	1	41.84	1	56.38
2	Kumiko Maeda / Aru Tateno		85.06	2	34.78	2	50.28

== International team selections ==
=== Winter Olympics ===
The Olympic team was announced as follows:

	Men	Ladies	Pairs	Ice dancing
1	Yuzuru Hanyu	Akiko Suzuki	Narumi Takahashi / Ryuichi Kihara	Cathy Reed / Chris Reed
2	Tatsuki Machida	Mao Asada		
3	Daisuke Takahashi	Kanako Murakami		
1st Alternate	Takahiko Kozuka			
2nd Alternate				

=== World Championships ===
The World Championships team was announced as follows:

	Men	Ladies	Pairs	Ice dancing
1	Yuzuru Hanyu	Akiko Suzuki	Narumi Takahashi / Ryuichi Kihara	Cathy Reed / Chris Reed
2	Tatsuki Machida	Mao Asada		
3	~~Daisuke Takahashi~~	Kanako Murakami		
1st Alternate	Takahiko Kozuka (added)			
2nd Alternate				

=== Four Continents Championships ===
The Four Continents Championships team was announced as follows:

	Men	Ladies	Ice dancing
1	Takahiko Kozuka	Kanako Murakami	Emi Hirai / Marien de la Asuncion
2	~~Nobunari Oda~~	Satoko Miyahara	
3	Keiji Tanaka	Haruka Imai	
1st Alternate	Takahito Mura (added)		
2nd Alternate			

=== World Junior Championships ===
The World Junior Championships team was announced as follows:

	Men	Ladies
1	Keiji Tanaka	Satoko Miyahara
2	Shoma Uno	Rika Hongo
1st Alternate		
