= Kazuki Tomono =

Japanese figure skater (born 1998)

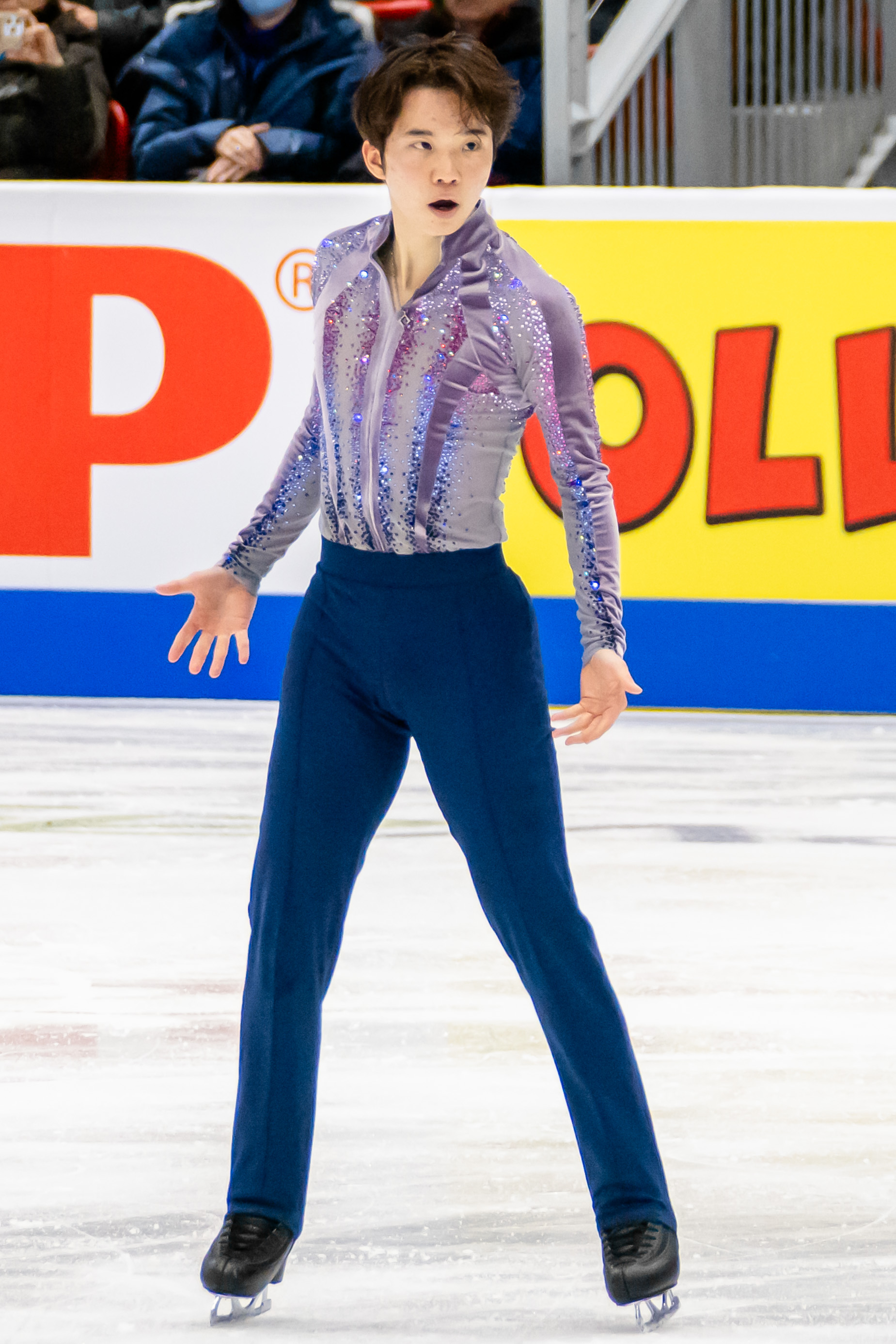
- Tomono during his short program at 2025 Skate America

Personal information
- Native name: 友野一希
- Born: May 15, 1998 (age 28) Osaka, Japan
- Height: 1.60 m (5 ft 3 in)

Figure skating career
- Country: Japan
- Discipline: Men's singles
- Coach: Taijin Hiraike; Yukako Sugita
- Skating club: Uenoshiba Skating Club
- Began skating: 2006
- Highest WS: 19th (2019–20)

Medal record
Four Continents Championships
Silver medal – second place	2022 Tallinn	Singles
Japan Championships
Bronze medal – third place	2022–23 Osaka	Singles
World Team Trophy
Bronze medal – third place	2023 Tokyo	Team

Kazuki Tomono (友野一希, Tomono Kazuki; born May 15, 1998) is a Japanese figure skater. He is the 2022 Four Continents silver medalist and a six-time Grand Prix medalist. He has represented Japan at three World Championships, achieving his best placement, fifth, at the 2018 World Championships. He is also the 2016–17 Japan Junior national champion.

== Personal life ==
Tomono was born May 15, 1998, in Osaka. His figure skating idols are Tatsuki Machida and Daisuke Takahashi.

In March 2021, Tomono graduated from Doshisha University's Sports Science department.

== Career ==
=== Early years ===
Tomono began learning to skate in 2006.

In August 2011, he placed seventh at the 2011 CS Asian Trophy in the junior men's competition. In November 2011, he placed ninth at the 2012 Japan Junior Championships.

In November 2012, he placed tenth at the 2013 Japan Junior Championships.

During the 2013–14 season, Tomono competed at the 2014 Japan Championships at both the junior and senior men's competition. He placed sixth in the junior men's competition and 20th in the senior men's competition. In March 2014, he won the silver medal at 2014 International Challenge Cup in the junior men's competition.

In the 2014–15 season, Tomono competed at both the junior and senior men's competition at the 2015 Japan Championships. He placed fourth in the junior men's competition and eighteenth in the senior men's competition. In March 2015, he won the silver medal at the 2015 Coupe Du Printemps in the junior men's competition.

=== 2015–2016 season: Junior Grand Prix debut ===
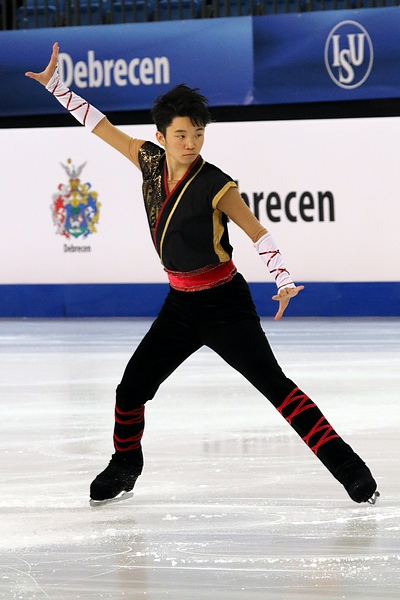
Tomono at the 2016 Junior World Championships

Tomono debuted on the ISU Junior Grand Prix (JGP) series in August 2015, placing thirteenth in Riga, Latvia. He won the silver medal at the 2015–16 Japan Junior Championships and placed sixteenth at the senior men's competition. He was brought in to compete at the 2016 World Junior Championships in Debrecen, Hungary, as a late alternate after Sota Yamamoto withdrew. He qualified for the free skate in Hungary by placing twentieth in the short program. His twelfth place in the free skate lifted him to fifteenth place overall.

=== 2016–2017 season: National junior title ===
Competing in the 2016–17 JGP series, Tomono placed fourth in Yokohama, Japan, and won the bronze medal in Ljubljana, Slovenia. He won the national junior title in November 2016 and placed fifth on the senior level at the Japan Championships in December 2016. He qualified for the free skate at the 2017 World Junior Championships in Taipei, Taiwan and placed ninth overall, fourteenth in the short program and seventh in the free skate.

=== 2017–2018 season: Worlds debut ===
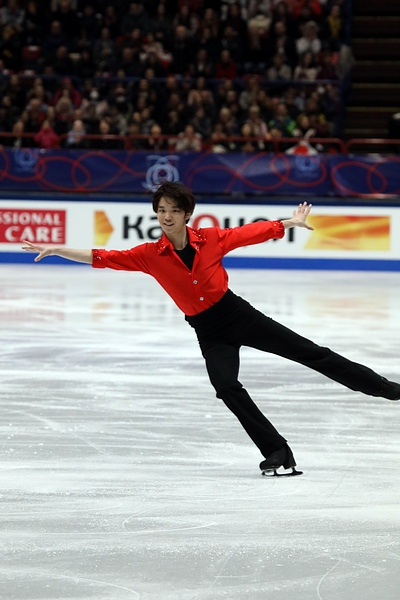
Tomono at the 2018 World Championships

Tomono began his season with a fifth-place finish at the 2017 U.S. Figure Skating Classic. In November, he replaced Daisuke Murakami at the 2017 NHK Trophy and finished seventh. After placing fifth in both segments, he placed fourth overall at the 2018 Japan Championships. At the 2018 Coupe du Printemps, he won the silver medal at the senior men's competition.

He was selected to compete at the 2018 Worlds in Milan, Italy, after the withdrawal of Yuzuru Hanyu. He finished eleventh in the short program, third in the free skate, and fifth overall, setting new personal bests in all segments of the competition. His breakout performances and result helped Team Japan secure three berths for the 2019 World Figure Skating Championships.

=== 2018–2019 season: First Grand Prix medal ===
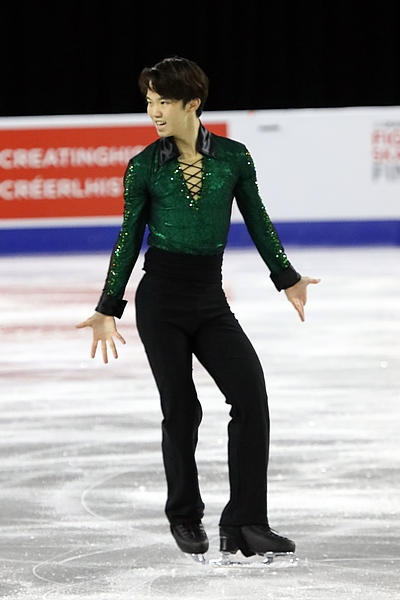
Tomono at the 2018 Skate Canada International

Tomono began his season with a fifth-place finish at 2018 CS Lombardia Trophy. In October, he placed ninth overall with a score of 220.83 at his first GP event 2018 Skate Canada International. In November, at 2018 Rostelecom Cup, he placed third overall with a personal best score of 238.73.

At the 2019 Japan Championships, he placed fourth overall, seventh in the short program, and third in the free skate. With Yuzuru Hanyu unready to compete and silver medalist Daisuke Takahashi declining international assignments, Tomono was sent to the 2019 Four Continents Championships, where he finished twelfth.

=== 2019–2020 season ===
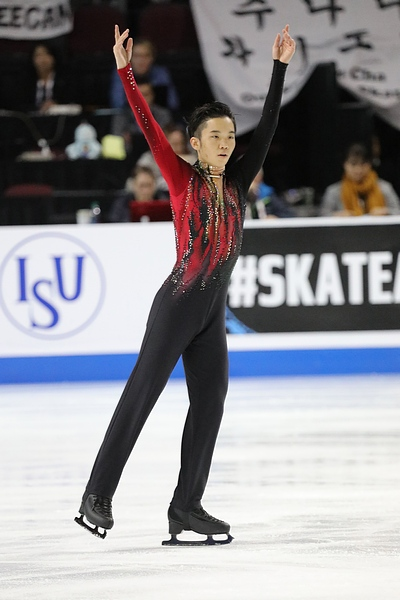
Tomono at the 2019 Skate America

Tomono placed seventh at the 2019 CS Lombardia Trophy to begin the season before placing fifth at the 2019 Skate America and eighth at the 2019 Rostelecom Cup.

At the 2020 Japan Championships, he placed sixth overall after placing eleventh in the short program and fourth in the free skate. With gold medalist Shoma Uno declining the invitation, Tomono was sent to the 2020 Four Continents Championships, where he finished seventh, setting new personal bests in all segments of the competition.

=== 2020–2021 season ===
Competing domestically, Tomono won the silver medal at the Western Sectionals championship, qualifying for a berth at the national championships. With the COVID-19 pandemic affecting international travel, the Grand Prix was assigned primarily based on geographic location, and Tomono competed at the 2020 NHK Trophy in an all-Japanese men's field. He placed second in the short program, 3.99 points behind Yuma Kagiyama. In the free skate, he doubled a quad attempt and turned out of another, among other jump errors, remaining in second place overall to take the silver medal, albeit nearly 50 points behind gold medalist Kagiyama's score. He assessed his errors as resulting from being "too careful."

Tomono placed sixth at the 2020–21 Japan Championships.

=== 2021–2022 season: Four Continents silver ===
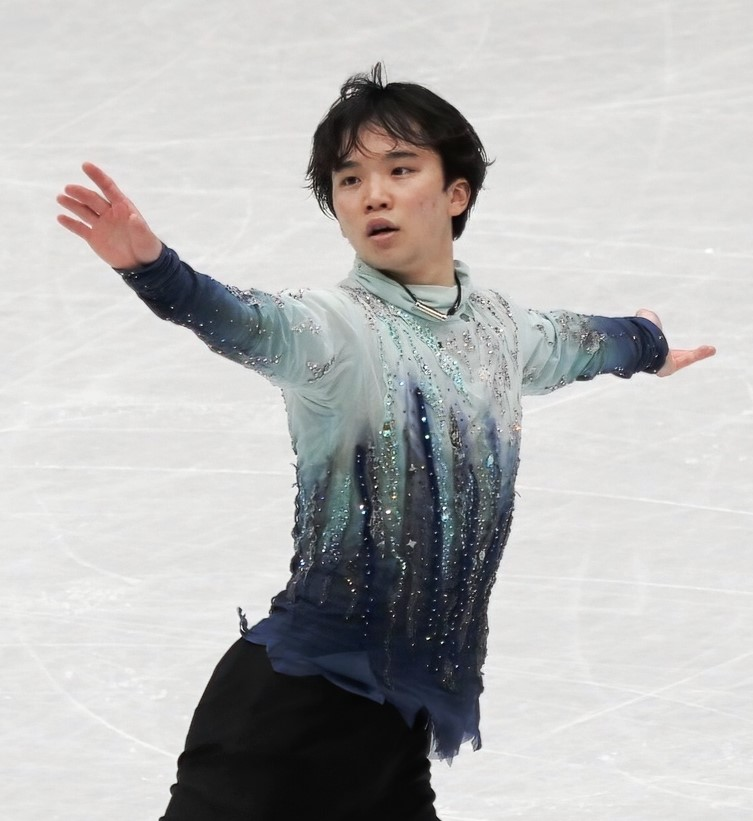
Tomono performing his short program at the 2022 World Championships

Tomono's first Grand Prix assignment was initially the 2021 Cup of China, but following its cancellation, he was reassigned to the 2021 Gran Premio d'Italia in Turin. He placed sixth at the event. At his second assignment, the 2021 Rostelecom Cup, he placed first in the short program and fifth in the free to finish third overall, setting new personal bests in all segments of the competition. This was the third Grand Prix medal of his career.

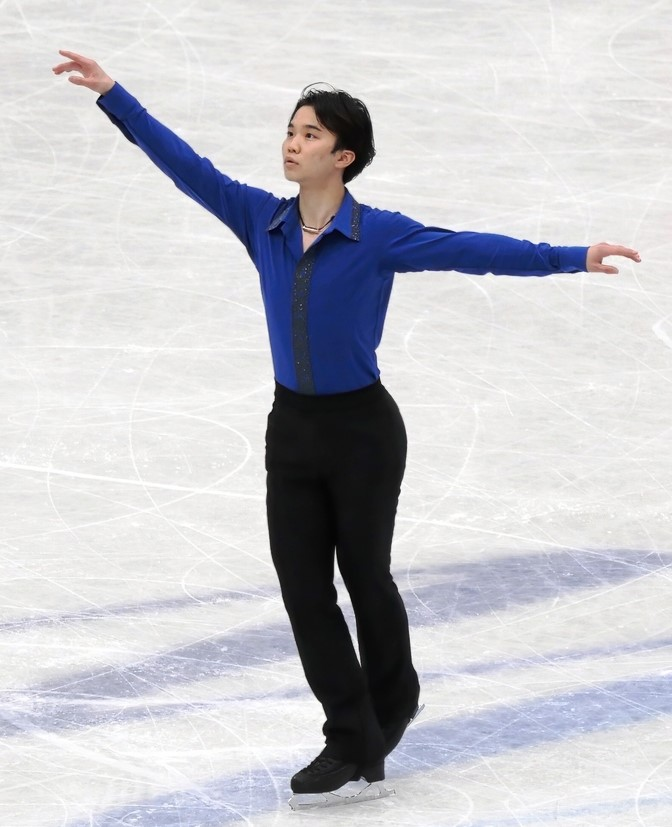
Kazuki Tomono performing his free program at the 2022 World Championships

At the 2021–22 Japan Championships, Tomono finished in fifth place. He was named as second alternate for the Japanese Olympic team and sent to compete at the 2022 Four Continents Championships.

Tomono finished second at Four Continents, setting new personal bests in all segments of the competition.

Following injury-related withdrawals by national champion Yuzuru Hanyu and first alternate Kao Miura, Tomono was named to the Japanese team for the 2022 World Championships. As a result of the International Skating Union banning all Russian athletes due to their country's invasion of Ukraine and the absences of Hanyu and Nathan Chen due to injury, the World Championships men's field was considered more open than usual.

A clean skate in the short program earned Tomono a new personal best and a small bronze medal for third place; he was one of three Japanese skaters to sweep the segment, along with Shoma Uno and Yuma Kagiyama. In the free skate, Tomono made a number of errors, dropping to sixth place overall. Speaking afterwards, Tomono expressed gratitude for "this wonderful opportunity to skate at the end of the season" while also noting that he had "regrets that I couldn't put on my best in this performance. I didn't really feel pressured, it was more the lack of practice, and I realized that I am not yet ready to be on the podium, so I need to practice harder."

=== 2022–2023 season: National bronze ===
In his first event of the season, Tomono came fourth at the 2022 CS Nebelhorn Trophy, including a third-place finish in the free skate. He placed second in the short program at the 2022 Grand Prix de France, the first of his two Grand Prix assignments, but dropped to third overall after the free skate and earned the bronze medal. He admitted to "some regrets to my performance" in the free, vowing to improve his mental consistency while under pressure to win. He praised the French audience at the event. After missing his quad Salchow in the short program at the 2022 NHK Trophy, he placed fourth in that segment. Despite being third in the free skate, he remained in fourth place overall, 2.93 points behind bronze medalist Cha Jun-hwan.

Tomono was fourth in both segments at the 2022–23 Japan Championships, but placed third overall, winning the bronze medal and standing on the senior national podium for the first time in his career. He was named to compete at the 2023 World Championships, held on home ice in Saitama.

In the short program in Saitama, Tomono finished seventh in the segment despite falling on an underrotated quad Salchow attempt. He set a new personal best in the free skate despite a fall on a quad toe loop, scoring 180.73 and rising to sixth overall. Tomono was then named to Team Japan for the 2023 World Team Trophy the following month. He came seventh in this short program as well with another quad Salchow fall. He was ninth in the free skate, having made several jump errors. Team Japan won the bronze medal.

During the off-season, Tomono was cast to play Koza for the summer show, One Piece on Ice.

=== 2023–2024 season ===
Tomono won the silver medal at the 2023 CS Nebelhorn Trophy in his first competition of the season. He was invited to participate in the Japan Open as part of the host team, coming second in the men's segment behind Ilia Malinin, while Team Japan won gold.

Appearing on the Grand Prix at the 2023 Skate Canada International, Tomono came third in the short program, but in the free skate he made three errors on his quad jumps and fell in the step sequence. He finished fifth in that segment, and dropped to fourth place overall, finishing 0.89 points behind bronze medalist Matteo Rizzo of Italy. He said afterward that his "skating condition was not at my max today." Tomono was fourth as well at the 2023 Cup of China.

Tomono finished sixth at the 2023–24 Japan Championships.

During the off-season, Tomono was cast to portray a younger version of the main character Kakeru, played by Daisuke Takahashi, as well as several other roles in the cross-genre ice show Hyoen - The Miracle of the Cross, a loose adaptation of Kenji Miyazawa's novel Night on the Galactic Railroad.

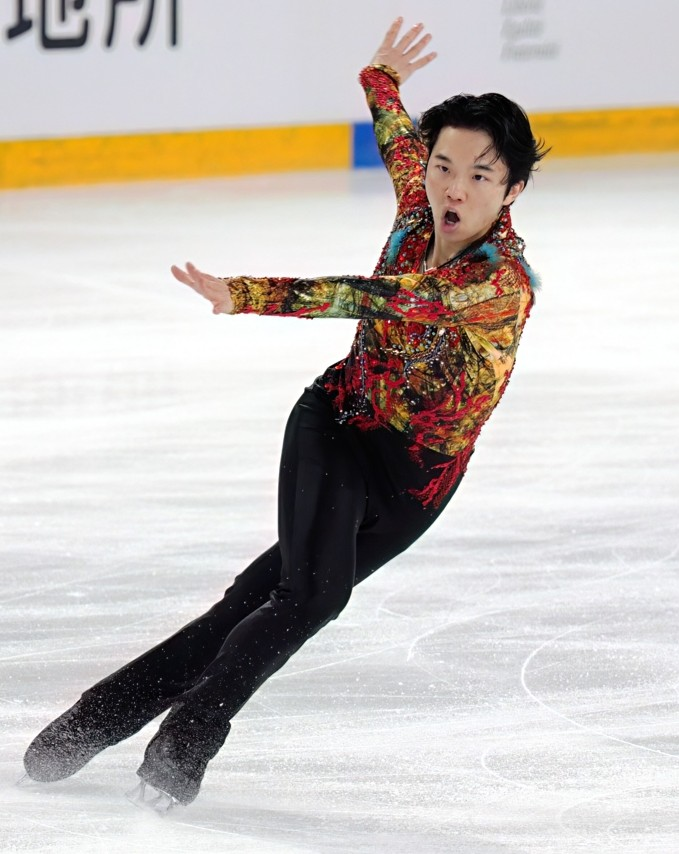
Tomono performing his short program at the 2024 Grand Prix de France

=== 2024–2025 season ===
During the off-season, Tomono sustained a hip injury, and he acknowledged going into his first competition of the season, the 2024 Grand Prix de France that he did not have the optimal training time to practice his jumps. He would place fifth at the event after finishing third in the short program and sixth in the free skate. After the free skate, he said, "To be honest, the result today was kind of expected for me because of the injury," and "I really couldn’t practice my step sequence recently. I was still pleased how I could perform it today." He expressed joy for his teammate, Koshiro Shimada, who won the silver medal. Two weeks later, at the 2024 Finlandia Trophy, Tomono placed second in the short program but only seventh in the free skate, falling to sixth place overall. He stated that he was "held back" due to his injury, but would "practice hard" for nationals.

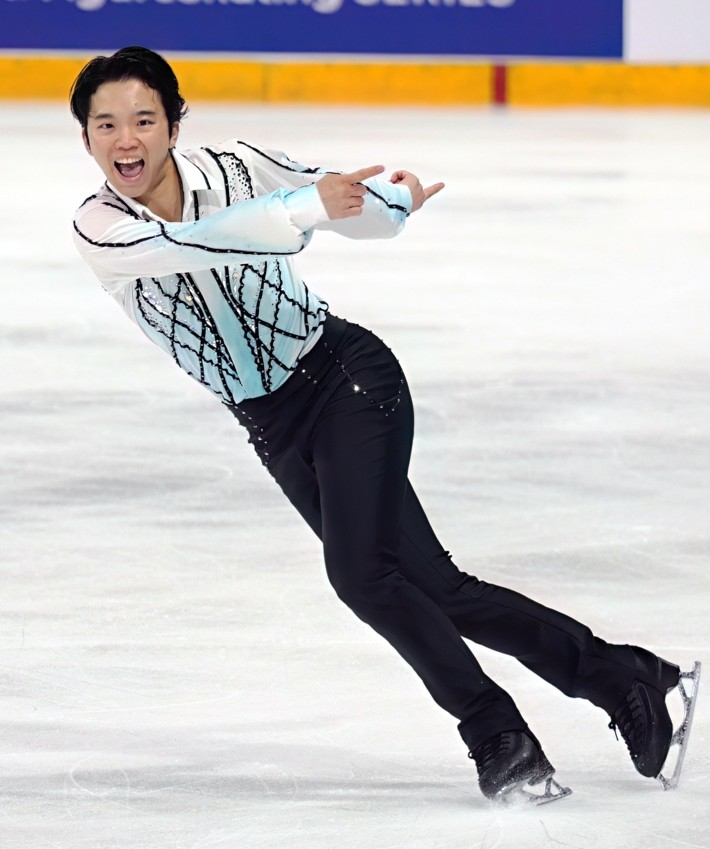
Tomono performing his free skate at the 2024 Grand Prix de France

In October 2024 Tomono joined forces with Olympic champion Shizuka Arakawa, Olympic bronze medalist Daisuke Takahashi, Kana Muramoto, Takahito Mura, Keiji Tanaka, Yuna Aoki, Kosho Oshima, Yuto Kishina and Rena Uezono to launch the members-only official fan community F-Ske on the platform FANICON.

At the 2024–25 Japan Championships, Tomono placed third in the short program but struggled during the free skate, only placing eighth in that segment, and dropping to fifth place overall. He expressed frustration with result, saying, "What I regret most is that I was unable to achieve results with so many people watching at home." Despite this, Tomono was subsequently named to the Four Continents team and selected as the second alternate to the 2025 World Championship team.

In late February, Tomono concluded the season with a fourth-place finish at the 2025 Four Continents Championships in Seoul, South Korea. Tomono said afterward that "I never had a season like this," and that he had learned much from his experiences that season.

=== 2025–2026 season ===
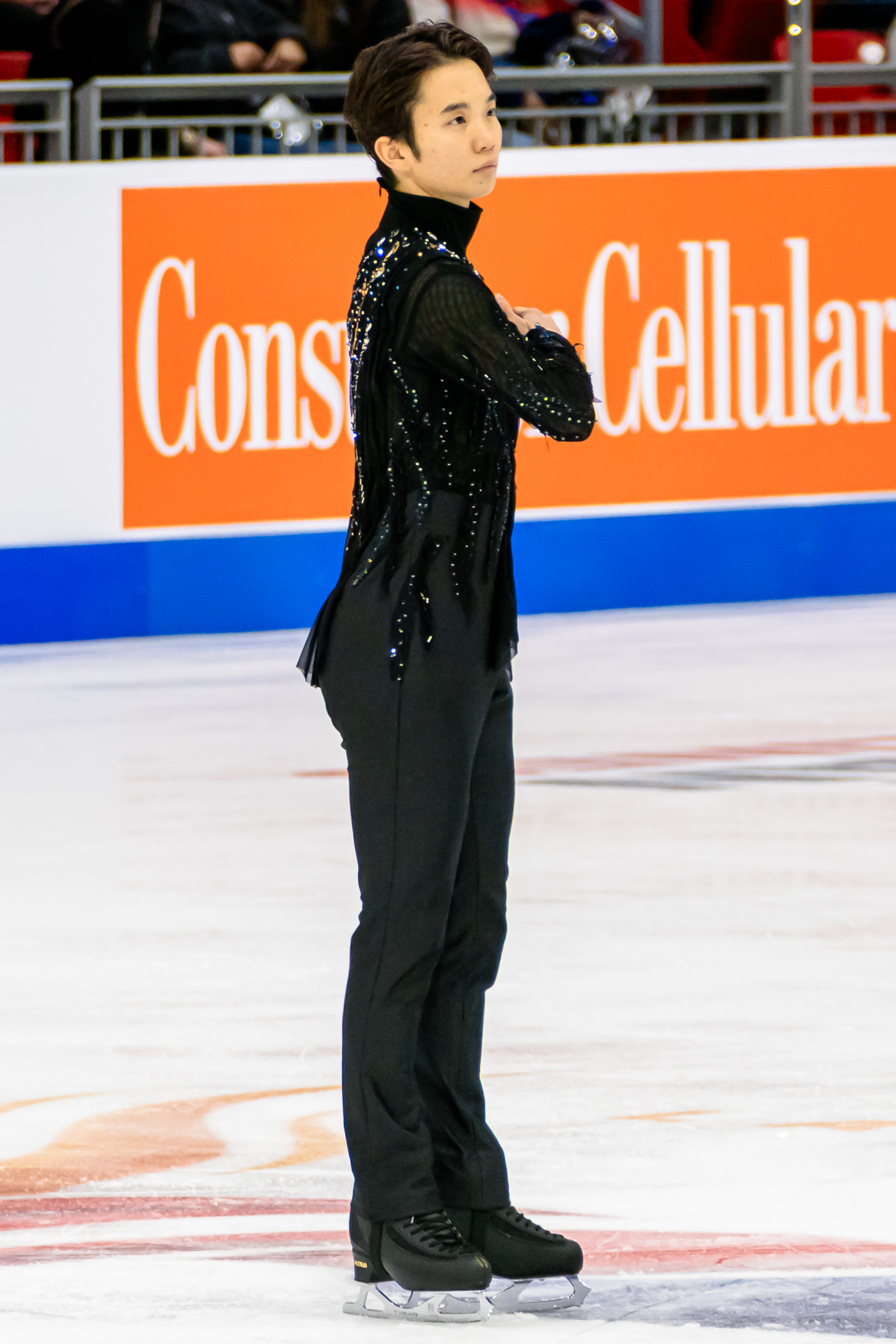
Tomono during his free skate at 2025 Skate America

Tomono began his season at the 2025 CS Kinoshita Group Cup in September. He placed second in the short program with a score of 85.08. Afterward, he said he put too much into his step sequence and became too excited, but he was overall satisfied with his performance and felt his jumps were calm. He said that he hoped to score over 90 points in the short program at his next competition. He remained in second place after the free program to win the silver medal behind Cha Jun-hwan. He subsequently finished fourth at the 2025 CS Nebelhorn Trophy.

In October, Tomono competed at 2025 Skate Canada International where he finished second in the short program with a new season's best score. However, he took two falls in the free skate and ended up in fourth place overall. Still, he earned a new season's best in all three scores at this event. "I do feel like I’ve been improving," he said. "Of course, it’s frustrating that I couldn’t make the podium, but I’ll accept that, and I really believe I can keep getting better.”

The following month, Tomono competed at 2025 Skate America where he earned the bronze medal. He was first after the short program, but had two falls in the free skate where he finished eighth, and subsequently dropped to third overall. "It was a bit of a challenging competition, but I was able to be aggressive and push towards the end," said Tomono after the free skate. "Although there were some regrets, it was a bit frustrating, but I'm glad I never gave up."

In December, he finished sixth at the 2025–26 Japan Championships and was named as the first alternate for the 2026 Winter Olympic team.

The following month, Tomono finished in fourth place at the 2026 Four Continents Figure Skating Championships. He placed second in the short program, but slipped to fourth overall after a fifth-place finish in the free skate. "Although the results were regrettable, I'm satisfied that I was able to finish the program this way after making the mistake," he said after the free skate. "I hope to continue working hard. I feel there are still many things I need to improve."

=== 2026–2027 season ===
Tomono won the gold medal in August at the Asian Open Figure Skating Trophy, his first competition of the season. Just a week later, Tomono participated in the Kinoshita Summer Cup and won the silver medal.

In October, Tomono placed sixth at the 2026 Skate Canada International.

The following month, Tomono won the bronze medal at 2026 Finlandia Trophy. “My goal was to trust myself more, stay calm and remember everything I’d done in training,” he said after the free skate. “I knew I’d be nervous, but I wanted to skate with confidence despite those nerves.”

== Programs ==
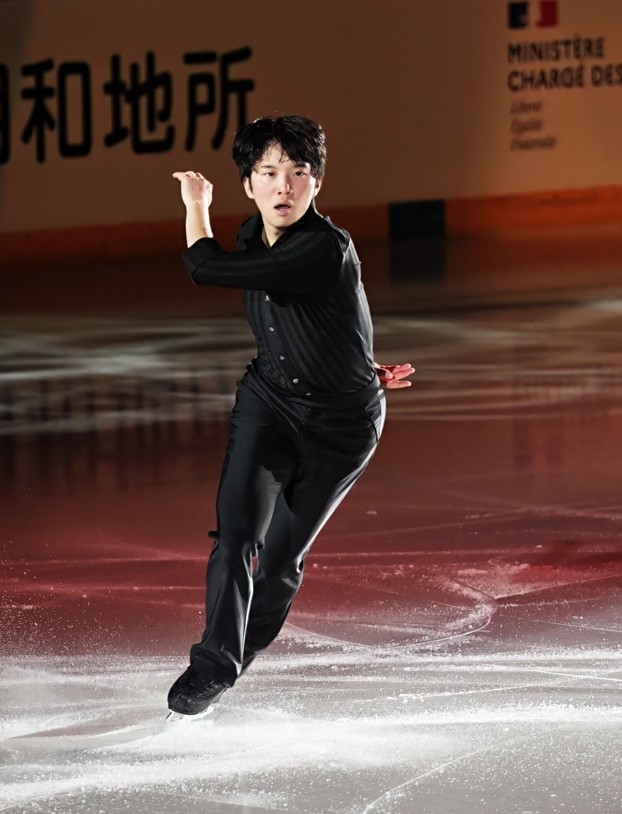
Tomono performing his exhibition program at the 2024 Grand Prix de France

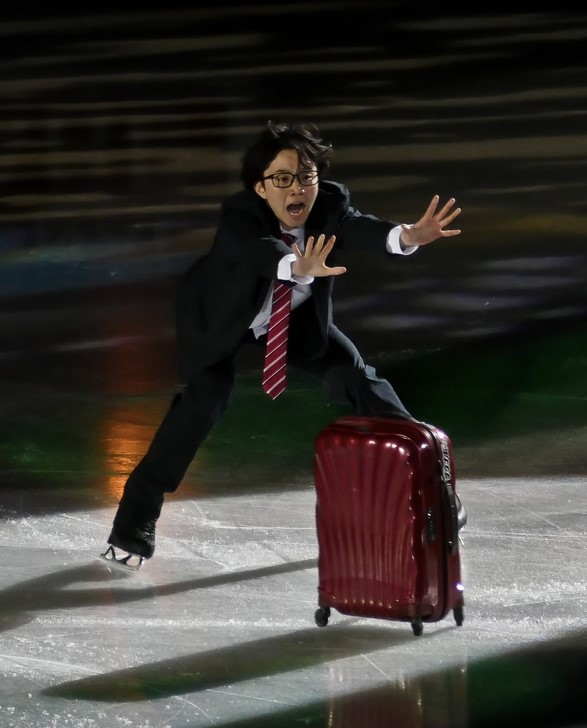
Tomono performing his exhibition program at the 2022 World Championships

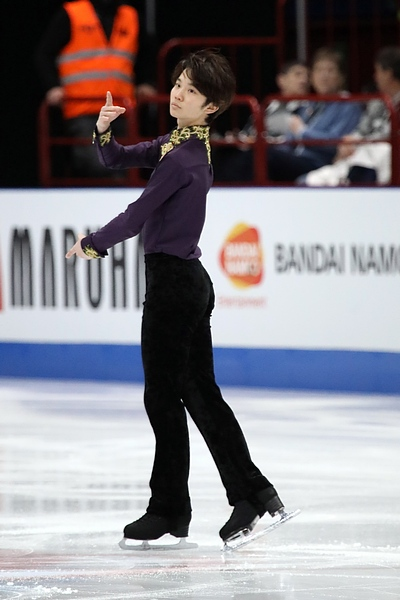
Tomono at the 2018 World Championships

Season	Short program	Free skating	Exhibition
2026–2027	That's It (I'm Crazy) by SOFI TUKKER choreo. by Shae-Lynn Bourne	It's a Beautiful Day by Queen choreo. by Shae-Lynn Bourne	Surf Rider by Il Est Vilaine choreo. by Kazuki Tomono
2025–2026	That's It (I'm Crazy) by SOFI TUKKER choreo. by Shae-Lynn Bourne	Halston by Stephan Moccio choreo. by Misha Ge	Don't Fall in Love by Wake Child choreo. by Kana Muramoto
2024–2025	Tshegue; Muanapoto by TSHEGUE, Faty Sy Savanet, & Nicolas Dacunha choreo. by Shae-Lynn Bourne	Butterfly; MOVEMENT 11'; I NEED YOU by Jon Batiste choreo. by Lori Nichol	Don't Fall in Love by Wake Child choreo. by Kana Muramoto
2023–2024	Underground by Cody Fry choreo. by Jeffrey Buttle	Halston by Stephan Moccio choreo. by Misha Ge	Jazz Machine by Black Machine choreo. by Cathy Reed
2022–2023	Happy Jazz; Real Gone by Sam Taylor; Happy by C2C choreo. by Misha Ge	Die Fledermaus by Johann Strauss II choreo. by Misha Ge	Tsumugi by ISSA; Daft Punk medley choreo. by Misao Sato; Epilogue; Summer Montage/Madeline; City of Stars performed by Ryan Gosling; Another Day of Sun (from La La Land) by Justin Hurwitz choreo. by Misha Ge; What's My Name？ - Day 2 Mix by Miyavi choreo. by Misao Sato
2021–2022	Love Theme (from Cinema Paradiso) by Ennio Morricone performed by Ikuko Kawai choreo. by Misha Ge	Epilogue; Summer Montage/Madeline; City of Stars performed by Ryan Gosling; Another Day of Sun (from La La Land) by Justin Hurwitz choreo. by Misha Ge	Bills by LunchMoney Lewis
2020–2021	The Hardest Button to Button (from Chroma) by The White Stripes choreo. by Phillip Mills	Ascension/Nature Boy by eden ahbez; El Tango de Roxanne (from Moulin Rouge!) both performed by Ewan McGregor choreo. by Misha Ge	Freaks by Timmy Trumpet choreo. by Misao Sato
2019–2020	The Hardest Button to Button (from Chroma) by The White Stripes choreo. by Phillip Mills	Ascension/Nature Boy by eden ahbez; El Tango de Roxanne (from Moulin Rouge!) both performed by Ewan McGregor choreo. by Misha Ge	Freaks by Timmy Trumpet choreo. by Misao Sato
2018–2019	Tema d'Amore (from Cinema Paradiso) by Ennio Morricone performed by Ikuko Kawai choreo. by Misha Ge	Reel Around the Sun; Caoineadh Cu Chulainn; Riverdance by Bill Whelan choreo. by Misao Sato	Daft Punk medley choreo. by Misao Sato
2017–2018	Zigeunerweisen Op. 20 (Gypsy Airs) by Pablo de Sarasate choreo. by Misao Sato, Akio Sasaki	West Side Story by Leonard Bernstein choreo. by Misao Sato, Akio Sasaki; Prologue; Symphonic Dances IV Mambo; Maria; Cool	
2016–2017	Symphony No. 5 by Ludwig van Beethoven; The Fifth by David Garrett choreo. by Misao Sato	An American in Paris by George Gershwin choreo. by Misao Sato	
2015–2016	Japanese Doll by Mizuo Osawa; Genkon by Kaoru Wada	Devdas by Shawkat; Muthu by A.R. Rahman	

== Competitive highlights ==
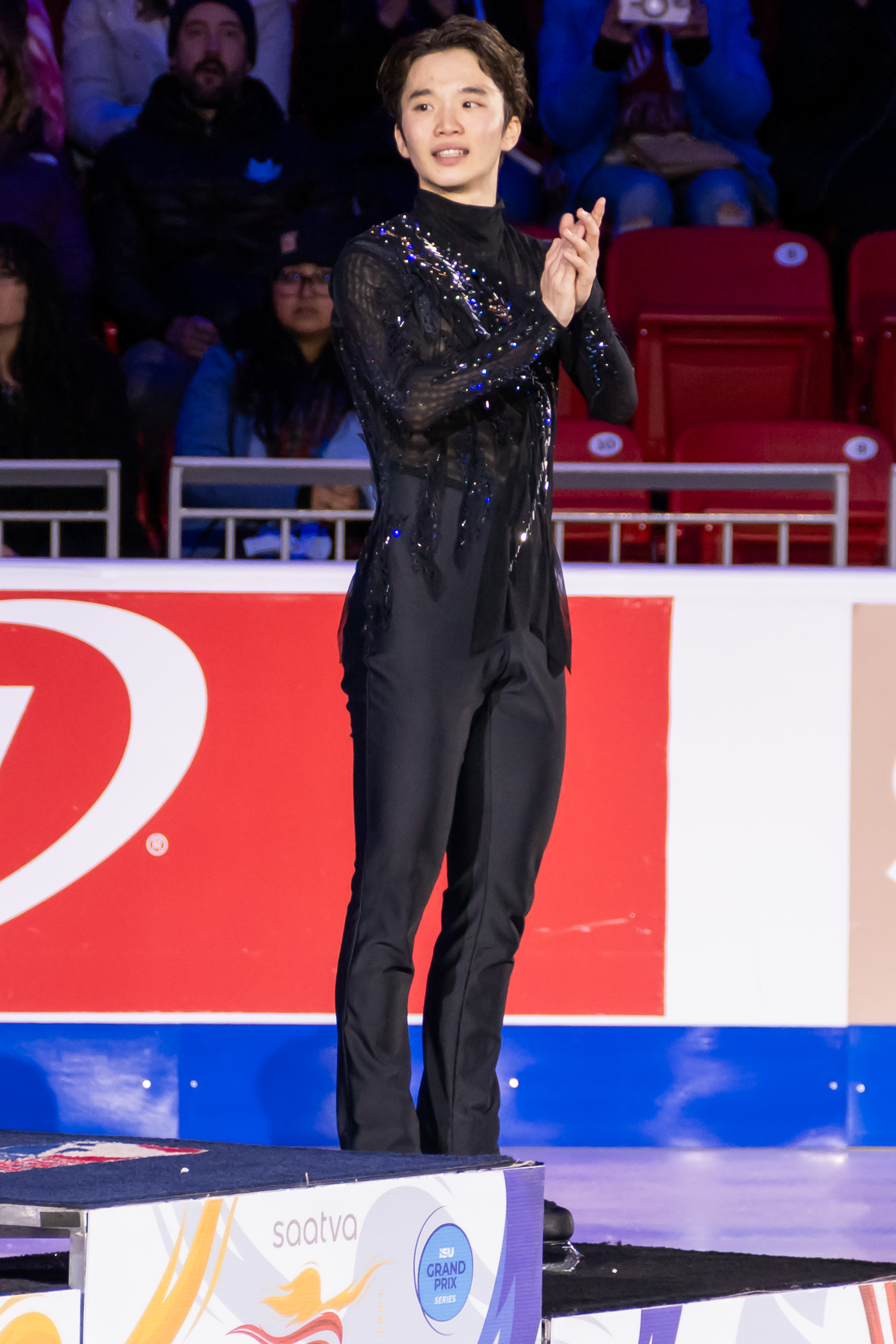
Tomono during the medal ceremony at 2025 Skate America

- GP – Event of the ISU Grand Prix Series
- JGP – Event of the ISU Junior Grand Prix Series
- CS – Event of the ISU Challenger Series
- TBD – Assigned
- WD – Withdrew from competition
- C – Event was cancelled
- Medals at team events are awarded for the team results only. Individual placements at team events are listed in parentheses.

Competition placements at senior level
Season	2017–18	2018–19	2019–20	2020–21	2021–22	2022–23	2023–24	2024–25	2025–26	2026–27
World Championships	5th				6th	6th				
Four Continents Championships		12th	7th		2nd			4th	4th	
Japan Championships	4th	4th	6th	6th	5th	3rd	6th	5th	6th	
World Team Trophy						3rd (7th)				
GP Cup of China					C		4th			
GP Finland								6th		3rd
GP France						3rd		5th		
GP Italy					6th					
GP NHK Trophy	7th			2nd		4th				
GP Rostelecom Cup		3rd	8th		3rd					
GP Skate America			5th						3rd	
GP Skate Canada		9th					4th		4th	6th
CS Kinoshita Group Cup									2nd	
CS Lombardia Trophy		5th	7th							
CS Nebelhorn Trophy						4th	2nd		4th	
CS U.S. Classic	5th									
Challenge Cup							3rd			
Coupe du Printemps	2nd				1st				2nd	
Japan Open					2nd (5th)		1st (2nd)			
Winter Universiade		6th								
Asian Open Figure Skating Trophy										1st

Competition placements at junior level
Season	2010–11	2011–12	2012–13	2013–14	2014–15	2015–16	2016–17
World Junior Championships						15th	9th
Japan Championships (Senior)				20th	18th	16th	5th
Japan Championships (Junior)	15th	9th	10th	6th	4th	2nd	1st
JGP Japan							4th
JGP Latvia						13th	
JGP Slovenia							3rd
Asian Open Trophy		7th					
Challenge Cup				2nd			
Coupe du Printemps					2nd		

== Detailed results ==
ISU personal best scores in the +5/-5 GOE System
Segment	Type	Score	Event
Total	TSS	273.41	2023 World Championships
Short program	TSS	101.12	2022 World Championships
Short program	TES	57.38	2022 World Championships
Short program	PCS	43.74	2022 World Championships
Free skating	TSS	180.73	2023 World Championships
Free skating	TES	93.86	2023 World Championships
Free skating	PCS	87.87	2023 World Championships

ISU personal best scores in the +3/-3 GOE System
Segment	Type	Score	Event
Total	TSS	256.11	2018 World Championships
Short program	TSS	82.61	2018 World Championships
Short program	TES	46.07	2018 World Championships
Short program	PCS	36.54	2018 World Championships
Free skating	TSS	173.50	2018 World Championships
Free skating	TES	94.40	2018 World Championships
Free skating	PCS	79.10	2018 World Championships

- Small medals for the short program and free skating are only awarded at ISU Championships.
- Medals at team events are awarded for the team results only. Individual placements at team events are listed in parentheses.

=== Senior level ===
Results in the 2013–14 season
Date	Event	SP		FS		Total	
Date	Event	P	Score	P	Score	P	Score
Dec 20–23, 2013	2013–14 Japan Championships	20	47.98	17	107.32	20	155.30

Results in the 2014–15 season
Date	Event	SP		FS		Total	
Date	Event	P	Score	P	Score	P	Score
Dec 22–26, 2014	2014–15 Japan Championships	20	51.38	18	99.97	18	151.35

Results in the 2015–16 season
Date	Event	SP		FS		Total	
Date	Event	P	Score	P	Score	P	Score
Dec 24–27, 2015	2015–16 Japan Championships	12	62.51	17	111.21	16	173.72

Results in the 2016–17 season
Date	Event	SP		FS		Total	
Date	Event	P	Score	P	Score	P	Score
Dec 22–25, 2016	2016-17 Japan Championships	6	67.63	5	148.92	5	216.55

Results in the 2017–18 season
Date	Event	SP		FS		Total	
Date	Event	P	Score	P	Score	P	Score
Sep 13–17, 2017	(United States) 2017 CS U.S. International Classic	8	69.88	5	155.42	5	225.30
Nov 10–12, 2017	(Japan) 2017 NHK Trophy	6	79.88	7	152.05	7	231.93
Dec 20–24, 2017	2017–18 Japan Championships	5	78.16	5	153.05	4	231.21
Mar 16–18, 2018	(Luxembourg) 2018 Coupe du Printemps	3	74.11	1	153.73	2	227.84
Mar 19–25, 2018	(Italy) 2018 World Championships	11	82.61	3	173.50	5	256.11

Results in the 2018–19 season
Date	Event	SP		FS		Total	
Date	Event	P	Score	P	Score	P	Score
Sep 12–16, 2018	(Italy) 2018 CS Lombardia Trophy	5	75.47	5	141.27	5	216.74
Oct 26–28, 2018	2018 Skate Canada International	8	81.63	10	139.20	9	220.83
Nov 16–18, 2018	(Russia) 2018 Rostelecom Cup	4	82.26	3	156.47	3	238.73
Dec 20–24, 2018	2018–19 Japan Championships	7	73.09	3	154.37	4	227.46
Feb 7–10, 2019	(United States) 2019 Four Continents Championships	12	74.16	12	132.25	12	206.41
Mar 7–9, 2019	(Russia) 2019 Winter Universiade	7	81.16	6	151.75	6	232.91

Results in the 2019–20 season
Date	Event	SP		FS		Total	
Date	Event	P	Score	P	Score	P	Score
Sep 13–15, 2019	(Italy) 2019 CS Lombardia Trophy	11	61.69	6	141.39	7	203.08
Oct 18–20, 2019	(United States) 2019 Skate America	8	75.01	4	154.71	5	229.72
Nov 15–17, 2019	(Russia) 2019 Rostelecom Cup	7	80.98	7	156.56	8	237.54
Dec 18–22, 2019	2019–20 Japan Championships	11	73.06	4	171.63	6	244.69
Feb 4–9, 2020	(South Korea) 2020 Four Continents Championships	7	88.22	7	162.83	7	251.05

Results in the 2020–21 season
Date	Event	SP		FS		Total	
Date	Event	P	Score	P	Score	P	Score
Nov 27–29, 2020	(Japan) 2020 NHK Trophy	2	83.27	3	143.35	2	226.62
Dec 24–27, 2020	2020–21 Japan Championships	7	81.72	8	141.44	6	223.16

Results in the 2021–22 season
Date	Event	SP		FS		Total	
Date	Event	P	Score	P	Score	P	Score
Oct 3, 2021	2021 Japan Open	–	–	5	147.44	2	–
Nov 5–7, 2021	(Italy) 2021 Gran Premio d'Italia	6	83.91	5	161.20	6	245.11
Nov 26–28, 2021	(Russia) 2021 Rostelecom Cup	1	95.81	5	168.38	3	264.19
Dec 22–26, 2021	2021–22 Japan Championships	7	87.79	5	175.88	5	263.67
Jan 18–23, 2022	(Estonia) 2022 Four Continents Championships	2	97.10	2	171.89	2	268.99
Mar 18–20, 2022	(Luxembourg) 2022 Coupe du Printemps	1	77.76	1	150.24	1	228.00
Mar 21–27, 2022	(France) 2022 World Championships	3	101.12	8	168.25	6	269.37

Results in the 2022–23 season
Date	Event	SP		FS		Total	
Date	Event	P	Score	P	Score	P	Score
Sep 21–24, 2022	(Germany) 2022 CS Nebelhorn Trophy	11	64.97	3	145.80	4	210.77
Nov 4–6, 2022	2022 Grand Prix de France	2	89.46	4	159.31	3	248.77
Nov 18–20, 2022	(Japan) 2022 NHK Trophy	4	85.07	3	166.76	4	251.83
Dec 21–25, 2022	2022–23 Japan Championships	4	85.43	4	165.41	3	250.84
Mar 20–26, 2023	(Japan) 2023 World Championships	7	92.68	6	180.73	6	273.41
Apr 13–16, 2023	(Japan) 2023 World Team Trophy	7	89.36	9	164.55	3 (7)	253.91

Results in the 2023–24 season
Date	Event	SP		FS		Total	
Date	Event	P	Score	P	Score	P	Score
Sep 20–23, 2023	(Germany) 2023 CS Nebelhorn Trophy	2	93.55	2	172.23	2	265.78
Oct 7, 2023	2023 Japan Open	–	–	2	177.72	1	–
Oct 27–29, 2023	2023 Skate Canada International	3	81.63	4	163.49	4	245.12
Nov 10–12, 2023	2023 Cup of China	6	80.50	4	171.45	4	251.95
Dec 20–24, 2023	2023–24 Japan Championships	6	86.88	5	184.64	6	271.52
Feb 22–25, 2024	(Netherlands) 2024 International Challenge Cup	3	84.74	3	166.87	3	251.61

Results in the 2024–25 season
Date	Event	SP		FS		Total	
Date	Event	P	Score	P	Score	P	Score
Nov 1–3, 2024	2024 Grand Prix de France	3	83.45	6	148.03	5	231.48
Nov 15–17, 2024	(Finland) 2024 Finlandia Trophy	2	90.78	7	147.63	6	238.41
Dec 19–22, 2024	2024–25 Japan Championships	3	89.72	8	144.23	5	233.95
Feb 19–23, 2025	(South Korea) 2025 Four Continents Championships	3	79.84	4	162.24	4	242.08

Results in the 2025–26 season
Date	Event	SP		FS		Total	
Date	Event	P	Score	P	Score	P	Score
Sep 5-7, 2025	(Japan) 2025 CS Kinoshita Group Cup	2	85.08	5	151.70	2	236.78
Sep 25-27, 2025	(Germany) 2025 CS Nebelhorn Trophy	3	86.43	6	148.16	4	234.59
Oct 31 – Nov 2, 2025	2025 Skate Canada International	2	92.07	5	159.39	4	251.46
Nov 14–16, 2025	(United States) 2025 Skate America	1	95.77	8	149.80	3	245.57
Dec 18–21, 2025	2025–26 Japan Championships	4	88.05	7	141.69	6	229.74
Jan 21-25, 2026	(China) 2026 Four Continents Championships	2	97.19	5	171.41	4	268.60
Mar 13–15, 2026	(Luxembourg) 2026 Coupe du Printemps	4	70.12	1	162.99	2	233.11

Results in the 2026–27 season
Date	Event	SP		FS		Total	
Date	Event	P	Score	P	Score	P	Score
Aug 1–5, 2026	(Indonesia) 2026 Asian Open Figure Skating Trophy	1	77.18	1	169.81	1	246.99
Aug 9–12, 2026	(Japan) 2026 Kinoshita Summer Cup	2	75.57	1	152.90	2	228.47
Oct 30–Nov 1, 2026	2026 Skate Canada	3	85.31	8	137.54	6	222.85

=== Junior level ===
Results in the 2010–11 season
Date	Event	SP		FS		Total	
Date	Event	P	Score	P	Score	P	Score
Nov 26–28, 2010	2010–11 Japan Championships (Junior)	12	45.44	15	82.11	15	127.55

Results in the 2011–12 season
Date	Event	SP		FS		Total	
Date	Event	P	Score	P	Score	P	Score
Aug 22–26, 2011	(China) 2011 Asian Open Trophy	6	36.49	7	79.03	7	115.52
Nov 25–27, 2011	2011–12 Japan Championships (Junior)	11	43.47	9	97.63	9	136.51

Results in the 2012–13 season
Date	Event	SP		FS		Total	
Date	Event	P	Score	P	Score	P	Score
Nov 17–18, 2012	2012–13 Japan Championships (Junior)	20	40.91	7	103.99	10	144.90

Results in the 2013–14 season
Date	Event	SP		FS		Total	
Date	Event	P	Score	P	Score	P	Score
Nov 22–24, 2013	2013–14 Japan Championships (Junior)	7	53.88	5	111.87	6	165.75
Mar 6–9, 2014	(Netherlands) 2014 International Challenge Cup	5	51.72	2	107.28	2	159.00

Results in the 2014–15 season
Date	Event	SP		FS		Total	
Date	Event	P	Score	P	Score	P	Score
Nov 22–24, 2014	2014–15 Japan Championships (Junior)	4	58.38	4	118.85	4	177.23
Mar 13–15, 2015	(Luxembourg) 2015 Coupe du Printemps	2	48.46	1	108.69	2	157.15

Results in the 2015–16 season
Date	Event	SP		FS		Total	
Date	Event	P	Score	P	Score	P	Score
Aug 27–29, 2015	2015 JGP Latvia	11	51.78	13	96.15	13	147.93
Nov 21–23, 2015	2015–16 Japan Championships (Junior)	3	63.53	3	119.66	2	183.19
Mar 14–20, 2016	(Hungary) 2016 World Junior Championships	20	58.33	12	121.28	15	179.61

Results in the 2016–17 season
Date	Event	SP		FS		Total	
Date	Event	P	Score	P	Score	P	Score
Sep 8–11, 2016	2016 JGP Japan	6	66.47	3	145.57	4	212.04
Sep 21–24, 2016	2016 JGP Slovenia	5	68.96	3	133.61	3	202.57
Nov 18–20, 2016	2016-17 Japan Championships (Junior)	1	71.77	1	136.08	1	207.85
Mar 15–19, 2017	(Taiwan) 2017 World Junior Championships	14	68.12	7	143.16	9	211.28
