= Yura Matsuda =

Japanese figure skater

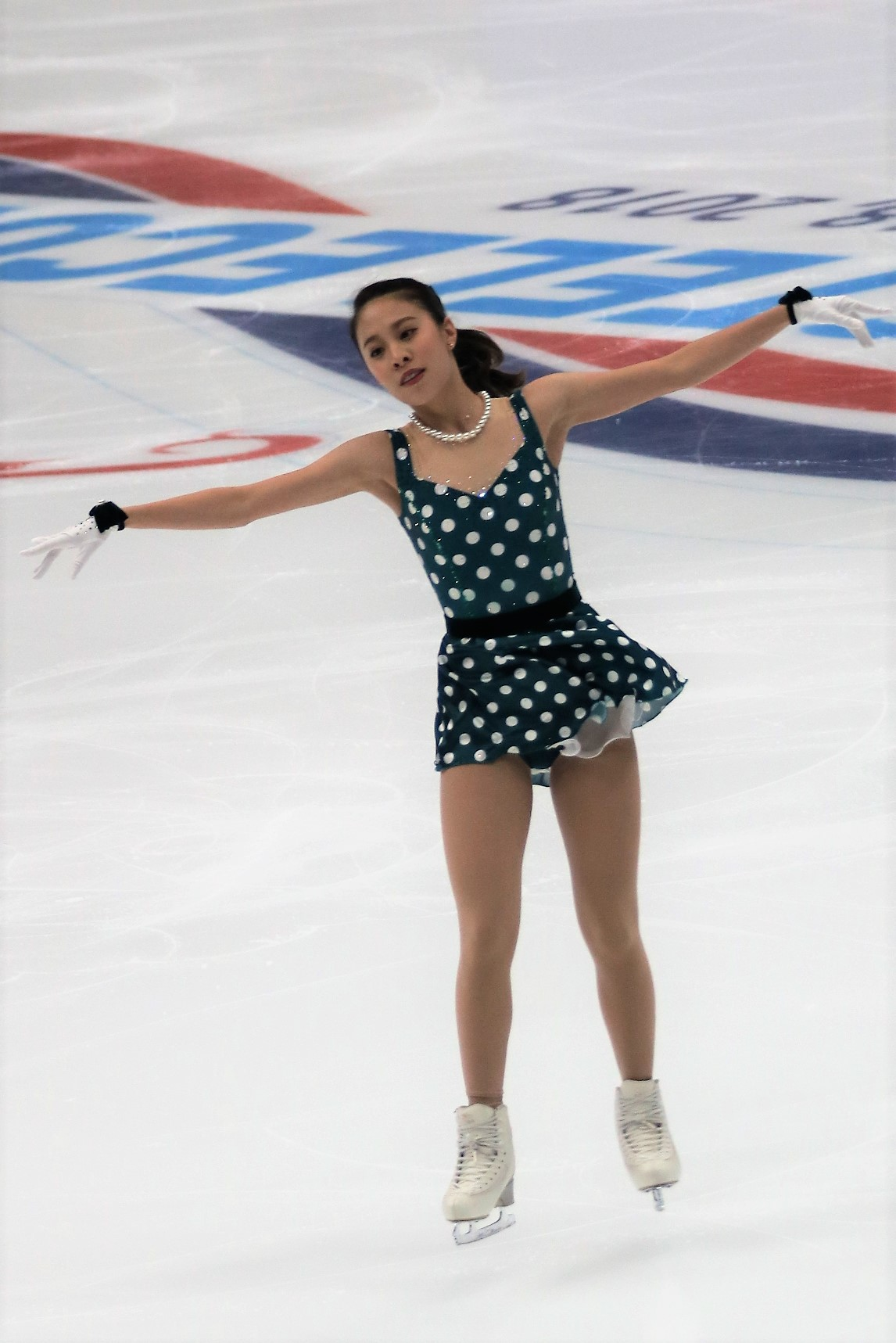
- Matsuda at the 2018 Rostelecom Cup

Personal information
- Native name: 松田 悠良
- Born: 22 July 1998 (age 28) Nagoya, Aichi Prefecture, Japan
- Home town: Nagoya
- Height: 1.55 m (5 ft 1 in)

Figure skating career
- Country: Japan
- Coach: Yoriko Naruse; Miho Kawaume
- Skating club: Chukyo University
- Began skating: 2005
- Retired: 2021

Yura Matsuda (松田 悠良, Matsuda Yura; born 22 July 1998) is a retired Japanese competitive figure skater. She is the 2015 Triglav Trophy silver medalist and 2016 Asian Open Figure Skating Trophy champion.

== Personal life ==
Matsuda was born on July 22, 1998, in Nagoya, Aichi Prefecture, Japan.

== Career ==
=== Early years ===
Matsuda began skating in 2005. In the 2011–2012 season, she placed 23rd at the Japan Junior Championships and won gold at the 2012 International Challenge Cup on the novice level.

=== 2012–2013 season ===
Matsuda debuted on the ISU Junior Grand Prix (JGP) circuit in the 2012–2013 season, finishing 6th at her event in Courchevel, France. After placing 4th at the Japan Junior Championships, she made her senior national debut, placing 8th at the 2012–13 Japan Championships. She ended her season with a silver medal on the junior level at the 2013 Triglav Trophy.

=== 2013–2014 season ===
During the 2013–2014 season, Matsuda placed 9th at her JGP event in Riga, Latvia. After winning the junior national bronze medal, she placed 9th on the senior level at the Japan Championships. She closed her season by winning the 2014 Coupe du Printemps on the junior level.

=== 2014–2015 season ===
In the 2014–2015 season, Matsuda placed 5th at the Japan Junior Championships and 15th at the Japan Championships. Making her senior international debut, she won the silver medal at the 2015 Triglav Trophy.

=== 2015–2016 to present ===
Scoring personal bests in all segments, Matsuda won the bronze medal at her 2015 JGP event in Logroño, Spain. She made her Grand Prix debut at the 2016 Rostelecom Cup.

== Programs ==
Season	Short program	Free skating	Exhibition
2020–2021	Sparkling Diamonds choreo. by Akiko Suzuki	Merry Go Round of Life from Howl's Moving Castle by Joe Hisaishi choreo. by Pasquale Camerlengo	
2019–2020	You'll Never Walk Alone choreo. by Miho Kawaume	Le Corsaire by Adolphe Adam, Ludwig Minkus choreo. by Miho Kawaume	
2018–2019	Me and My Girl by Noel Gay choreo. by Akiko Suzuki	Autumn: Petit Adagio (from The Seasons) by Alexander Glazunov choreo. by Jeremy Abbott	
2017–2018	Ancora Non Sai by David Foster choreo. by Mihoko Higuchi	Spanish Caravan by The Doors choreo. by Mihoko Higuchi	
2016–2017	The Piano by Michael Nyman choreo. by Mihoko Higuchi	Spanish Caravan by The Doors choreo. by Mihoko Higuchi	Nine: Finale
2015–2016	The Piano by Michael Nyman choreo. by Mihoko Higuchi	Swan Lake by Pyotr Ilyich Tchaikovsky choreo. by Mihoko Higuchi	
2013–2014	España cañí by Pascual Marquina Narro choreo. by Kenji Miyamoto	Crazy For You by George Gershwin choreo. by Miho Kawaume	
2012–2013	Csárdás by Vittorio Monti choreo. by Miho Kawaume	Crazy For You by George Gershwin choreo. by Miho Kawaume	
2011–2012	unknown	Le Corsaire by Adolphe Adam, Ludwig Minkus	Over the Rainbow (from The Wizard of Oz) by Harold Arlen

== Competitive highlights ==
GP: Grand Prix; CS: Challenger Series; JGP: Junior Grand Prix

International
Event	11–12	12–13	13–14	14–15	15–16	16–17	17–18	18–19	19–20	20–21
GP NHK Trophy						7th				
GP Rostelecom						6th		9th		
GP Skate Canada								11th		
CS Autumn Classic								9th		
CS Lombardia							5th			
Asian Open						1st				
Triglav Trophy				2nd						
International: Junior
JGP France		6th								
JGP Latvia			9th							
JGP Spain					3rd					
Coupe Printemps			1st							
Triglav Trophy		2nd								
National
Japan		8th	9th	15th	12th	10th	11th		21st	28th
Japan Junior	23rd	4th	3rd	6th						
