= Akiko Suzuki =

Japanese figure skater

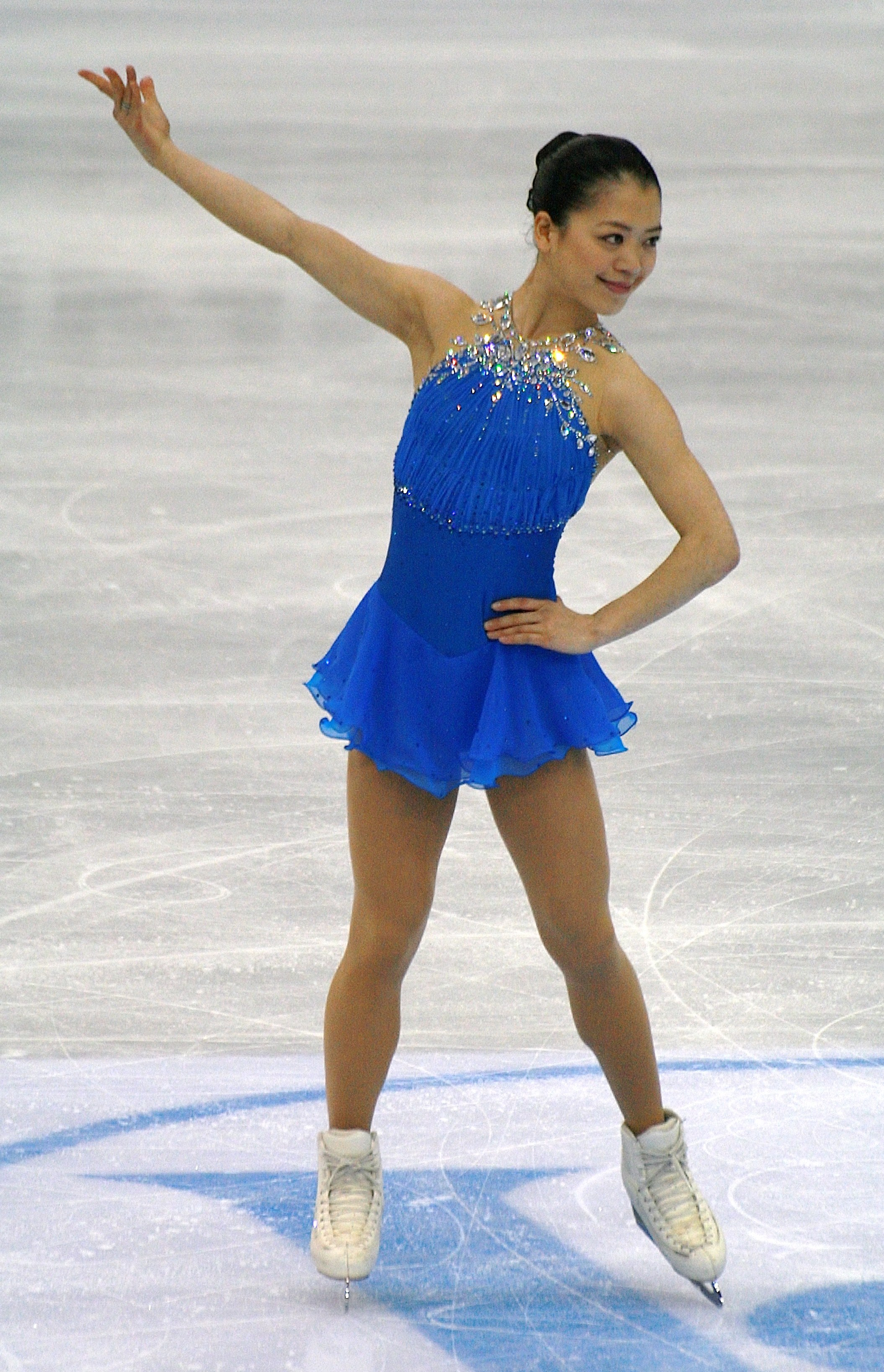
- Akiko Suzuki at the 2012 World Championships in Nice, France

Personal information
- Native name: 鈴木明子
- Born: March 28, 1985 (age 41) Toyohashi, Aichi Prefecture
- Height: 1.60 m (5 ft 3 in)

Figure skating career
- Country: Japan
- Coach: Hiroshi Nagakubo, Yoriko Naruse
- Skating club: Howa Sports Land
- Began skating: 1992
- Retired: 2014
| Event | Gold medal – first place | Silver medal – second place | Bronze medal – third place |
| World Championships | 0 | 0 | 1 |
| Four Continents Championships | 0 | 2 | 0 |
| Grand Prix Final | 0 | 1 | 2 |
| Japan Championships | 1 | 2 | 0 |
| World Team Trophy | 1 | 0 | 1 |
| Junior Grand Prix Final | 0 | 0 | 1 |
Medal list
World Championships
| Bronze medal – third place | 2012 Nice | Singles |
Four Continents Championships
| Silver medal – second place | 2010 Jeonju | Singles |
| Silver medal – second place | 2013 Osaka | Singles |
Grand Prix Final
| Silver medal – second place | 2011–12 Quebec | Singles |
| Bronze medal – third place | 2009–10 Tokyo | Singles |
| Bronze medal – third place | 2012–13 Sochi | Singles |
Japan Championships
| Gold medal – first place | 2013–14 Saitama | Singles |
| Silver medal – second place | 2009–10 Osaka | Singles |
| Silver medal – second place | 2011–12 Osaka | Singles |
World Team Trophy
| Gold medal – first place | 2012 Tokyo | Team |
| Bronze medal – third place | 2013 Tokyo | Team |
Junior Grand Prix Final
| Bronze medal – third place | 2001–02 Bled | Singles |

Akiko Suzuki (鈴木 明子, Suzuki Akiko) (born March 28, 1985) is a Japanese figure skating choreographer and retired competitive figure skater. She is the 2012 World Championships bronze medalist, a three-time Grand Prix Final medalist (2011 silver, 2009 & 2012 bronze), a two-time Four Continents silver medalist (2010, 2013), the 2007 Winter Universiade champion, and the 2013 Japanese national champion. She placed eighth at the 2010 and 2014 Winter Olympics.

== Personal life ==
Suzuki was born on March 28, 1985, in Toyohashi, Aichi Prefecture. She became engaged to a former classmate in June 2016 and married him on February 1, 2017. They divorced in 2018.

== Career ==
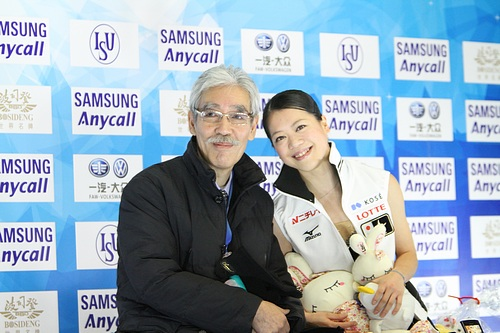
Suzuki with coach Hiroshi Nagakubo

Suzuki trained in Nagoya, Japan. She began skating at age 6. At the same time, she worked for Toho Real Estate, which has its own skating rink.

=== Early career ===
Suzuki debuted on the Junior Grand Prix of Figure Skating series in 1999 with one assignment in Sweden, where she took 7th place. In the 2000–2001 season, she received two assignments, where she placed 6th and 8th.

The next season, she won the bronze medal at the 2001–02 Junior Grand Prix Final after winning the Junior Grand Prix in Japan and taking bronze at the Junior Grand Prix in the Czech Republic. In the 2002–2003 season, she won her assignment in the United States, but she placed 5th at her second assignment in China and did not advance to the final.

Later in 2003, after a successful junior career, she was hampered by her struggles with anorexia nervosa, which began at age 18 when she left home for university and to train with coach Hiroshi Nagakubo. As a teenager, she began to restrict what kinds of food she ate and often went hungry due to the pressure to maintain a low weight and act responsible, but she was in good health overall.

On going to university, where she was in control of her own diet, she began to lose dangerous amounts of weight. Suzuki said she kept the disorder to herself and that "People don’t get it. They assume eating is easy. It’s not like I didn’t want to eat." Her weight fell to 32 kg. Nagakubo and the head of the skating division, out of concern for her health, eventually asked her to temporarily stop competing and to return home and see a doctor. Although she initially resisted the diagnosis of an eating disorder, she began recovering with professional help and support from her mother.

Due to her recovery, she missed the entire 2003–2004 season, during which she did not train for months. She returned to university in October 2003 and was able to compete at an intercollegiate competition in January, though still far from her previous level.

=== 2004–2005 to 2008–2009 ===
Suzuki returned to competitive skating in the 2004–2005 season after being inspired by Shizuka Arakawa's victory at the 2004 World Championships.

She had a breakthrough in 2007–2008, winning several events, including the 2007 Winter Universiade, and achieving her highest finish at Japanese nationals since 2002. She consequently received her first senior Grand Prix assignment in 2008–2009, and won the silver medal at the 2008 NHK Trophy. That same season, she also won the 2008 Finlandia Trophy and finished 8th at the 2009 Four Continents Championships.

=== 2009–2010 season ===
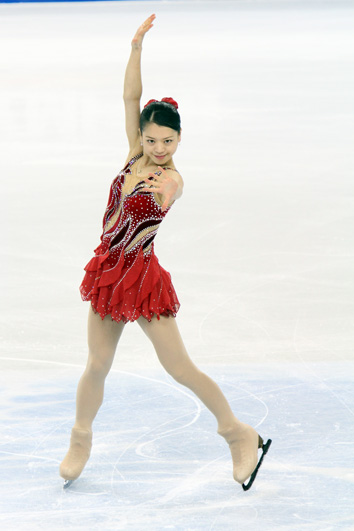
Suzuki at the 2010 World Championships

Suzuki appeared at two Grand Prix events, winning the 2009 Cup of China and finishing 5th at the 2009 Skate Canada International. She qualified to the 2009–10 Grand Prix Final, where she won the bronze medal. She was awarded a place on the Japanese Olympic team after she placed second at the 2009–10 Japan Championships. She was also assigned to compete at the 2010 Four Continents Championships, where she won the silver medal. At the Olympics, she finished 8th, and she was later 11th at the 2010 World Championships – her first senior World Championships.

=== 2010–2011 season ===
Suzuki opened her season with gold at the 2010 Finlandia Trophy. She received silver at both of her Grand Prix events, the 2010 Cup of Russia and the 2010 Cup of China. She qualified for her second consecutive Grand Prix Final, this time finishing fourth. A fourth-place finish at the national championships left her off the World Championships team, but she was selected to go to the 2011 Four Continents Championships, where she finished 7th.

=== 2011–2012 season ===
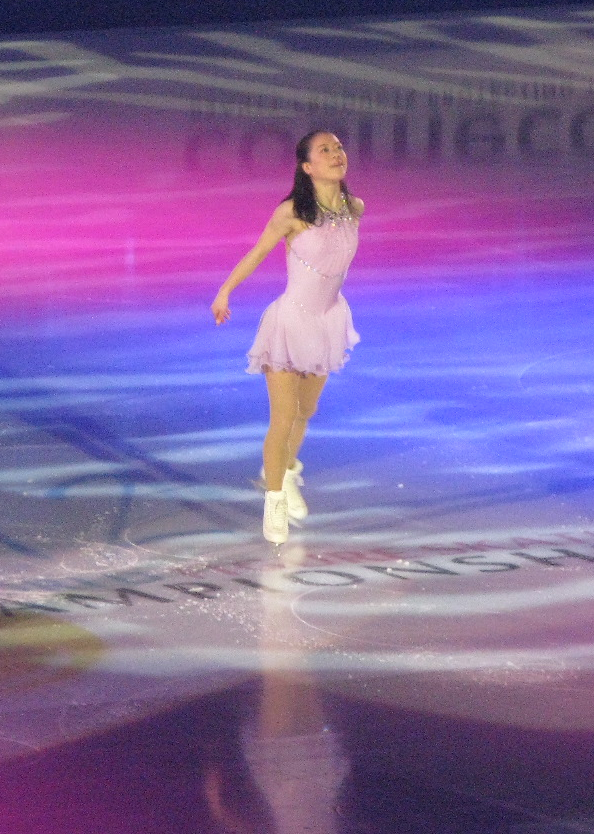
Suzuki at the 2012 World Championships

Competing again on the Grand Prix series, Suzuki won the silver medal at the 2011 Skate Canada International and the gold medal at the 2011 NHK Trophy. Her placements qualified her for the 2011 Grand Prix Final where she won the silver medal. She won the silver behind Mao Asada at the 2011–12 Japan Championships. At the 2012 World Championships, Suzuki won the bronze medal, becoming the oldest ladies' single skater to medal at the event since Maria Butyrskaya. At the 2012 ISU World Team Trophy, she won the ladies' event, defeating World champion Carolina Kostner. Team Japan also won the event overall.

=== 2012–2013 season ===
Suzuki received the same Grand Prix assignments as the previous season. She won the silver medal at the 2012 Skate Canada International and the 2012 NHK Trophy, qualifying her for the 2012–13 Grand Prix Final. At the final, she placed third in the short program. She fell twice in the free skating, finishing third overall. In December 2012, Suzuki said that the 2013–14 season would be her last. She finished fourth at the 2012–13 Japan Championships behind Satoko Miyahara.

Suzuki won the silver medal at the 2013 Four Continents Championships, as part of a Japanese sweep of the ladies' event with teammates Mao Asada and Kanako Murakami taking the gold and bronze medal respectively. She placed twelfth at the 2013 World Championships. At the 2013 World Team Trophy, Suzuki placed first; Team Japan placed third overall. Her free skating score of 133.02 and her combined total score of 199.58 are her personal best scores.

=== 2013–2014 season ===
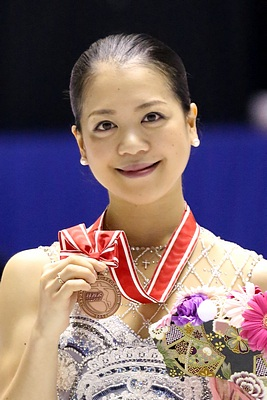
Suzuki with her bronze medal at the 2013 NHK Trophy

Suzuki began her season at the 2013 Finlandia Trophy, where she won the silver medal behind Yulia Lipnitskaya. She won another silver at the 2013 Skate Canada International, again behind Lipnitskaya. At the 2013 NHK Trophy, she earned the bronze medal after placing second in the short and fourth in the free skating.

Suzuki won gold at the 2013–14 Japan Championships, ahead of Kanako Murakami and Mao Asada. She placed second in the short program behind Asada, but rebounded to first place after winning the free skating. She skated two clean programs and earned the highest free skating and total score to date in the ladies' event at the Japan Figure Skating Championships.

At the 2014 Winter Olympics, Suzuki competed in the free skating portion of the figure skating team event, placing fourth in that segment; Japan finished fifth overall. She went on to place eighth in the ladies' singles competition. At the 2014 World Championships, she placed fourth in the short program with a personal best score, eighth in the free skating, and sixth overall. Following the World Championships, Suzuki announced her retirement from competitive skating.

== Post-competitive career ==
Following her retirement in 2014, Suzuki began working as a choreographer and teaching with her longtime coach, Hiroshi Nagakubo, at the Howa Sports Land Skating Club in the Aichi Prefecture. She credited figure skating choreographers Shae-Lynn Bourne and Pasquale Camerlengo for inspiring her to start working as a choreographer. Suzuki has been a mainstay in Shizuka Arakawa's Friends on Ice show since its second edition in 2007 and was a main cast member of the annual touring ice show Fantasy on Ice, having participated in all editions from 2010 to 2019. In 2022 she did the commentary for the live broadcast at the tour stop in Nagoya amongst others. In 2017, 2019 and 2021 she appeared in the new, innovative cross-genre ice show Hyoen, starring her peer Daisuke Takahashi. In 2024 she provided choreography for the Hyoen production "The Miracle of the Cross Star" and for the new ice show BISF25. She also provided motion capture and choreography for the anime adaptation of Medalist.

Suzuki has choreographed for the following skaters:

- Yuna Aoki
- Mone Chiba
- Maria Egawa
- Rika Hongo
- Moa Iwano
- Yuma Kagiyama
- Takeru Amine Kataise
- Lim Eun-soo
- Yura Matsuda
- Miyu Nakashio
- Mai Mihara
- Haruna Murakami
- Yuka Nagai
- Ami Nakai
- Rin Nitaya
- Kaori Sakamoto
- Sae Shimizu
- Shin Ji-a
- Shun Sato
- Yuna Shiraiwa
- Rion Sumiyoshi
- Yo Takagi
- Tatsuya Tsuboi
- Kaoruko Wada
- Sota Yamamoto
- Mako Yamashita
- Yuhana Yokoi

Suzuki has also spoken extensively about her experience with her eating disorder in public lectures and to the media.

== Programs ==
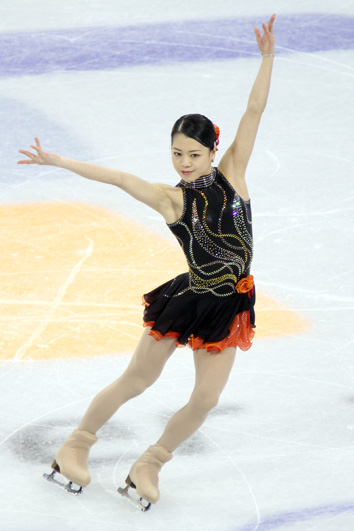
Suzuki at the 2010 Olympics

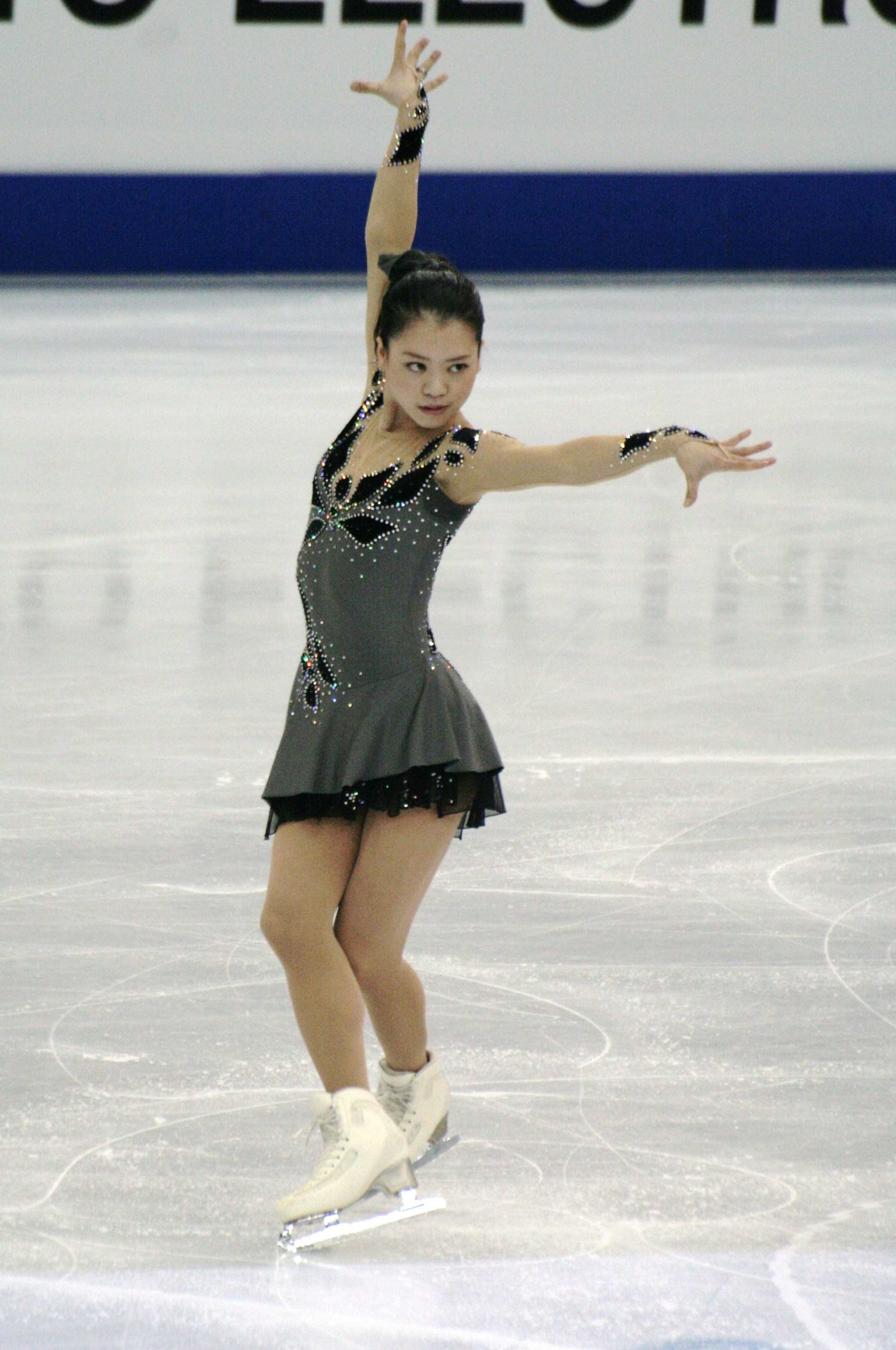
Suzuki at the 2012 World Championships

=== Post-2014 ===
| Season | Exhibition |
|---|---|
| 2017–2018 | O (from Cirque du Soleil) by Benoît Jutras choreo. by Pasquale Camerlengo |

=== Pre-2014 ===
| Season | Short program | Free skating | Exhibition |
|---|---|---|---|
| 2013–2014 | Hymne à l'amour by Marguerite Monnot choreo. by Massimo Scali | The Phantom of the Opera by Andrew Lloyd Webber choreo. by Pasquale Camerlengo | Ladies in Lavender by Nigel Hess choreo. by Kenji Miyamoto; Love Dance (from Cirque du Soleil's Kà) by René Dupéré |
| 2012–2013 | Battle Without Honor or Humanity (from Kill Bill) by Tomoyasu Hotei choreo. by Anjelika Krylova | O (from Cirque du Soleil) by Benoît Jutras choreo. by Pasquale Camerlengo | Les parapluies de Cherbourg by Michel Legrand choreo. by Massimo Scali |
| 2011–2012 | Hungarian Rhapsody by Franz Liszt arranged by Edvin Marton choreo. by Anjelika Krylova | Die Fledermaus overture by Johann Strauss II choreo. by Pasquale Camerlengo | Ladies in Lavender by Nigel Hess choreo. by Kenji Miyamoto; You Haven't Seen the Last of Me by Cher; Show Me How You Burlesque by Christina Aguilera choreo. by Anjelika Krylova |
| 2010–2011 | Tango Jalousie by Jacob Gade choreo. by Kenji Miyamoto | Fiddler on the Roof (musical) by Jerry Bock choreo. by Pasquale Camerlengo | Bellezza by Wibi Soerjadi choreo. by Akiko Suzuki; Ice Queen by Paul Dinletir; Prophecy by Harem choreo. by Miki Sakagami and JANSU; Tennessee Waltz by Patti Page choreo. by Akiko Suzuki |
| 2009–2010 | Andalucia; Firedance (from Riverdance) by Bill Whelan choreo. by Kenji Miyamoto | West Side Story by Leonard Bernstein choreo. by Shae-Lynn Bourne | Caribe by Michel Camilo choreo. by Kenji Miyamoto |
| 2008–2009 | La campanella by Franz Liszt choreo. by Kenji Miyamoto | Dark Eyes by Francis Lai choreo. by Yuko Hongo, Noriko Sato | Libertango by Astor Piazzolla choreo. by Kenji Miyamoto |
| 2007–2008 | Firedance (from Riverdance) by Bill Whelan choreo. by Nanami Abe | Titanic by James Horner choreo. by Nanami Abe | Titanic by James Horner; Nocturne by Secret Garden |
| 2006–2007 | Firedance (from Riverdance) by Bill Whelan choreo. by Nanami Abe | Moonlight Sonata by Ludwig van Beethoven | It's A Beautiful Day by Sarah Brightman; Nocturne by Secret Garden |
| 2005–2006 | Bolero Fantasy by The Planets | Moonlight Sonata by Ludwig van Beethoven | |
| 2004–2005 | Bolero Fantasy by The Planets | Salome by Richard Strauss | |
| 2003–2004 | Bolero Fantasy by The Planets | The Red Violin from Rodorigo | |
| 2002–2003 | Introduction and Rondo Capriccioso by Camille Saint-Saëns | The Red Violin from Rodorigo | |
| 2001–2002 | Piano Concerto No. 1 in E minor, Op. 11 by Frédéric Chopin by Osaka Philharmonic Orchestra | Romeo and Juliet by Nino Rota, William Walton, Sergei Prokofiev by The Royal Scottish National Orchestra | |
| 2000–2001 | Canciones Populares Españolas by Manuel de Falla | Concierto de Aranjuez by Joaquín Rodrigo | |

== Competitive highlights ==
- GP: Grand Prix; JGP: Junior Grand Prix

International
| Event | 98–99 | 99–00 | 00–01 | 01–02 | 02–03 | 03–04 | 04–05 | 05–06 | 06–07 | 07–08 | 08–09 | 09–10 | 10–11 | 11–12 | 12–13 | 13–14 |
|---|---|---|---|---|---|---|---|---|---|---|---|---|---|---|---|---|
| Olympics | | | | | | | | | | | | 8th | | | | 8th |
| Worlds | | | | | | | | | | | | 11th | | 3rd | 12th | 6th |
| Four Continents | | | | 8th | | | | | | | 8th | 2nd | 7th | | 2nd | |
| GP Final | | | | | | | | | | | | 3rd | 4th | 2nd | 3rd | |
| GP Cup of China | | | | | | | | | | | | 1st | 2nd | | | |
| GP Cup of Russia | | | | | | | | | | | | | 2nd | | | |
| GP NHK Trophy | | | | | | | | | | | 2nd | | | 1st | 2nd | 3rd |
| GP Skate Canada | | | | | | | | | | | | 5th | | 2nd | 2nd | 2nd |
| Finlandia Trophy | | | | | | | | | | | 1st | | 1st | | | 2nd |
| Nebelhorn Trophy | | | | | | | | | | | 3rd | | | | | |
| Challenge Cup | | | | | | | | | | 1st | | | | | | |
| Golden Spin | | | | | | | | 7th | | 1st | | | | | | |
| Triglav Trophy | | | | | | | | | | | | | 1st | | | |
| Universiade | | | | | | | 8th | | 1st | | | | | | | |
| New Zealand WG | | | | | | | | | | | | 1st | | | | |
International: Junior
| Junior Worlds | | | 7th | | | | | | | | | | | | | |
| JGP Final | | | | 3rd | | | | | | | | | | | | |
| JGP China | | | | | 5th | | | | | | | | | | | |
| JGP Czech Republic | | | | 3rd | | | | | | | | | | | | |
| JGP Japan | | | | 1st | | | | | | | | | | | | |
| JGP Norway | | | 8th | | | | | | | | | | | | | |
| JGP Sweden | | 7th | | | | | | | | | | | | | | |
| JGP Ukraine | | | 6th | | | | | | | | | | | | | |
| JGP United States | | | | | 1st | | | | | | | | | | | |
| Triglav Trophy | 2nd | | | | | | | | | | | | | | | |
National
| Japan Champ. | | | 4th | 4th | 9th | | 12th | 12th | 10th | 5th | 4th | 2nd | 4th | 2nd | 4th | 1st |
| Japan Junior | 3rd | 5th | 2nd | 5th | 5th | | | | | | | | | | | |
Team events
| Olympics | | | | | | | | | | | | | | | | 5th T |
| World Team; Trophy | | | | | | | | | | | | | | 1st T 1st P | 3rd T 1st P | |
| Japan Open | | | | | | | | | | | | | | 3rd T 3rd P | 1st T 3rd P | |

== Detailed results ==
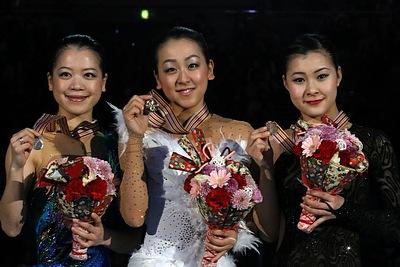
Suzuki at the medal ceremony of the 2013 Four Continents Championships

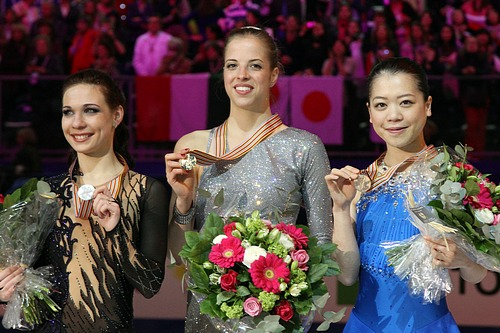
Suzuki at the medal ceremony of the 2012 World Championships

Small medals for short program and free skating awarded only at ISU Championships. At team events, medals awarded for team results only.

- ^team event – This is a team event; medals are awarded for the team results only.
  - ^T – team result
  - ^P – personal/individual result

2013–14 season
| Date | Event | SP | FS | Total |
|---|---|---|---|---|
| March 24–30, 2014 | 2014 World Championships | 4; 71.02 | 8; 122.70 | 6; 193.72 |
| February 19–20, 2014 | 2014 Winter Olympics | 8; 60.97 | 8; 125.35 | 8; 186.32 |
| February 6–9, 2014 | 2014 Winter Olympics ^{team event} | – | 4; 112.33 | 5^{T} |
| December 20–23, 2013 | 2013–14 Japan Championships | 2; 70.19 | 1; 144.99 | 1; 215.18 |
| November 8–10, 2013 | 2013 NHK Trophy | 2; 66.03 | 4; 113.29 | 3; 179.32 |
| October 25–27, 2013 | 2013 Skate Canada International | 2; 65.76 | 2; 127.99 | 2; 193.75 |
| October 4–6, 2013 | 2013 Finlandia Trophy | 2; 64.57 | 3; 115.97 | 2; 180.54 |
2012–13 season
| Date | Event | SP | FS | Total |
| April 11–14, 2013 | 2013 World Team Trophy | 2; 66.56 | 1; 133.02 | 3^{T} / 1^{P} 199.58^{P} |
| March 10–17, 2013 | 2013 World Championships | 7; 61.17 | 13; 103.42 | 12; 164.59 |
| February 8–11, 2013 | 2013 Four Continents Championships | 2; 65.65 | 2; 124.43 | 2; 190.08 |
| December 20–23, 2012 | 2012–13 Japan Championships | 1; 65.09 | 5; 114.94 | 4; 180.03 |
| December 6–9, 2012 | 2012–13 Grand Prix Final | 3; 65.00 | 3; 115.77 | 3; 180.77 |
| November 23–25, 2012 | 2012 NHK Trophy | 5; 58.60 | 1; 126.62 | 2; 185.22 |
| October 26–28, 2012 | 2012 Skate Canada International | 5; 55.12 | 1; 120.04 | 2; 175.16 |
| October 6, 2012 | 2012 Japan Open | – | 3; 110.07 | 1^{T} |
2011–12 season
| Date | Event | SP | FS | Total |
| April 18–22, 2012 | 2012 World Team Trophy | 2; 67.51 | 2; 120.28 | 1^{T} / 1^{P} 187.79^{P} |
| March 26 – April 1, 2012 | 2012 World Championships | 5; 59.38 | 2; 121.30 | 3; 180.68 |
| December 23–25, 2011 | 2011–12 Japan Championships | 3; 59.60 | 1; 119.67 | 2; 179.27 |
| December 8–11, 2011 | 2011–12 Grand Prix Final | 2; 61.30 | 3; 118.46 | 2; 179.76 |
| November 11–13, 2011 | 2011 NHK Trophy | 1; 66.55 | 2; 119.43 | 1; 185.98 |
| October 27–30, 2011 | 2011 Skate Canada International | 4; 52.82 | 1; 119.44 | 2; 172.26 |
| October 1, 2011 | 2011 Japan Open | – | 3; 112.46 | 3^{T} |
2010–11 season
| Date | Event | SP | FS | Total |
| April 7–10, 2011 | 2011 Triglav Trophy | 1; 57.15 | 2; 90.83 | 1; 147.98 |
| February 15–20, 2011 | 2011 Four Continents Championships | 6; 57.64 | 7; 104.95 | 7; 162.59 |
| December 23–26, 2010 | 2010–11 Japan Championships | 7; 56.86 | 4; 119.10 | 4; 175.96 |
| December 9–12, 2010 | 2010–11 Grand Prix Final | 4; 58.26 | 5; 115.46 | 4; 173.72 |
| November 19–21, 2010 | 2010 Cup of Russia | 1; 57.43 | 2; 115.31 | 2; 172.74 |
| November 5–7, 2010 | 2010 Cup of China | 2; 57.97 | 2; 104.89 | 2; 162.86 |
| October 8–10, 2010 | 2010 Finlandia Trophy | 2; 57.74 | 1; 108.83 | 1; 166.57 |
2009–10 season
| Date | Event | SP | FS | Total |
| March 22–28, 2010 | 2010 World Championships | 20; 48.36 | 7; 111.68 | 11; 160.04 |
| February 12–28, 2010 | 2010 Winter Olympics | 11; 61.02 | 7; 120.42 | 8; 181.44 |
| January 25–31, 2010 | 2010 Four Continents Championships | 1; 58.88 | 2; 114.84 | 2; 173.72 |
| December 25–27, 2009 | 2009–10 Japan Championships | 4; 67.84 | 2; 128.06 | 2; 195.90 |
| December 3–6, 2009 | 2009–10 Grand Prix Final | 5; 57.54 | 3; 116.46 | 3; 174.00 |
| November 19–22, 2009 | 2009 Skate Canada International | 8; 53.10 | 5; 94.62 | 5; 147.72 |
| October 29 – November 1, 2009 | 2009 Cup of China | 4; 59.52 | 1; 117.14 | 1; 176.66 |
2008–09 season
| Date | Event | SP | FS | Total |
| February 2–8, 2009 | 2009 Four Continents Championships | 9; 55.40 | 8; 104.96 | 8; 160.36 |
| December 25–27, 2008 | 2008–09 Japan Championships | 6; 57.02 | 3; 116.96 | 4; 173.98 |
| November 27–30, 2008 | 2008 NHK Trophy | 4; 55.56 | 2; 112.08 | 2; 167.64 |
| October 9–12, 2008 | 2008 Finlandia Trophy | 1; 58.40 | 1; 112.28 | 1; 170.68 |
| September 25–28, 2008 | 2008 Nebelhorn Trophy | 3; 55.02 | 3; 91.91 | 3; 146.93 |
2007–08 season
| Date | Event | SP | FS | Total |
| March 6–9, 2008 | 2008 Challenge Cup | 1; 53.70 | 1; 98.32 | 1; 152.02 |
| December 26–28, 2007 | 2007–08 Japan Championships | 5; 58.66 | 5; 101.27 | 5; 159.93 |
| November 8–11, 2007 | 2007 Golden Spin of Zagreb | 1; 55.62 | 1; 101.28 | 1; 156.90 |
2006–07 season
| Date | Event | SP | FS | Total |
| January 17–27, 2007 | 2007 Winter Universiade | 1; 50.40 | 1; 97.84 | 1; 148.24 |
| December 27–29, 2006 | 2006–07 Japan Championships | 11; 48.72 | 9; 96.50 | 10; 145.22 |
