= Ayaka Hosoda =

Japanese figure skater

Personal information
- Native name: 細田采花
- Born: February 3, 1995 (age 31)
- Home town: Suita, Osaka, Japan

Figure skating career
- Country: Japan
- Skating club: Kansai University FSC

Ayaka Hosoda (Japanese: 細田采花; born February 3, 1995) is a Japanese former figure skater who now works as a coach.

== Early life ==
Hosoda was born in Suita. She began ballet at age four, and her parents enrolled in theater in kindergarten because she was very shy.

Hosoda skated for the first time at 7 years old; she disliked it at first because it was cold and it hurt when she fell. She started training in earnest at 8 years old. She originally trained with coach Utako Nagamitsu. After meeting Kanako Murakami at a training camp as a novice, Hosoda began to engage with skating more seriously.

== Career ==
In 2006, Hosoda qualified to her first Japan Championships as a novice skater. The next year, she finished in fourth place after falling twice.

She moved up to the junior level in 2008, where she placed 10th at the national championships. The next year, however, she failed to qualify. Hosoda described this time in her life as a "rebellious phase" where she had trouble controlling her emotions, and she also had a growth spurt. In 2010, she changed coaches to Mie Hamada, but she often did not go to practice.

In 2011, she moved to the senior level, and in 2012, she qualified to the senior Japan Championships. Hosoda credited the influence of Daisuke Takahashi as encouraging her to work harder; she had attended a training camp in the US with him, where she observed him working in practice, but they did not share ice sessions in Japan. She was aware that Takahashi, nine years older than her, might retire from competition soon, and she was determined to compete at the same national championships as him.

Hosoda finished 15th at the 2016 Japan Championships, her best result thus far. In her last year of university, she planned to retire after the National Sports Festival of Japan, held in January. However, she was invited to practice the triple Axel jump by her young training mate Rika Kihira. Hosoda agreed, and to her surprise, began to land the jump. She chose to take leave from school and resume competing. At the 2017 Japan Championships, she landed a triple Axel during a practice session but finished 26th in the short program and did not qualify for the free skate.

The next year, she landed the triple Axel at the Kinki regional championships. In her free skate at the Western Japan sectional championships, she landed a triple Axel-double toe loop combination as well as a second triple Axel. In December, Hosoda landed three clean triple Axels at the 2018 Japan National Championships. She finished 8th overall, her highest ever placement.

She decided to continue her competitive career after consulting with her coach. However, she struggled to maintain the same level of skating; the next year, she placed 16th at the Western Japan sectional championships, failing to advance to the national championships, and she began to have pain in her lower back. In 2020, she transferred coaches to Takeshi Honda, and she placed 19th at the sectional championships. In 2021, she withdrew from the Kinki regional championships, meaning that she could not attempt to qualify for the national championships, due to her continued back pain as well as problems with her knees. Although she was encouraged to compete with lesser jump content, Hosoda said that she was determined to compete only if she could land a triple Axel: "I'm not doing this because I'm aiming for the Olympics. [...] I'm "Ayaka Hosoda with the triple Axel", so I didn't want to spoil that."

Hosoda retired from competition after the 2021–2022 season. Despite failing to qualify for the national championships three years in a row, she said that she was happy with her decision to continue, saying that she found her new, more thoughtful and autonomous, approach to training useful for her future career as a coach.

== Post-competitive career ==
Hosoda began to teach classes and accompany younger skaters to competitions at the end of her competitive career. She started working as a coach at Kanku Ice Arena in 2022.

== Programs ==
Season	Short program	Free skating	Exhibition
2020–21	Fantasy for Violin and Orchestra from Ladies in Lavender soundtrack by Nigel Hess choreo. by Cathy Reed	Concerto in F by George Gershwin choreo. by Cathy Reed	
2018–19	Scent of a Woman: Tango (Por Una Cabeza) by Itzhak Perlman, John Williams choreo. by Jeffrey Buttle	Sunset Boulevard by Andrew Lloyd Webber choreo. by Cathy Reed	Lovefool by Peter Svensson covered by Postmodern Jukebox
2017–18	Swan Lake by Pyotr Ilyich Tchaikovsky	unknown	

== Competitive highlights ==
JGP: Junior Grand Prix

International
Event	08–09	09–10	10–11	11–12	12–13	13–14	14–15	15–16	16–17	17–18	18–19
Crystal Skate		7th									
National
Japan					20th	16th	17th	27th	15th	26th	8th
Japan Junior	10th		20th								
TBD = Assigned
