= Mariko Kihara =

Japanese figure skater

Personal information
- Native name: 木原 万莉子
- Born: September 4, 1997 (age 29) Ōtsu, Shiga Prefecture, Japan
- Height: 1.56 m (5 ft 1 1/2 in)

Figure skating career
- Country: Japan
- Coach: Bruno Marcotte
- Skating club: Kyoto Daigo FSC
- Began skating: 2004
- Retired: 2017

Mariko Kihara (born September 4, 1997) is a Japanese former figure skater. She won three senior internationals – the 2014 Coupe du Printemps, 2015 Bavarian Open, and 2016 Triglav Trophy. She is now a choreographer with an interest in figure skaters' nutrition.

== Career ==
Kihara began skating at age 7 after seeing a Prince Ice World show and being inspired to try the sport. She debut internationally as a novice in 2008. She described herself as not enjoying practice but having a competitive nature.

She was able to land all jumps (except the Axel jump) as triples by the time she was in sixth grade about 12 years old. However, in the summer of 2010, she attended a training camp organized by the Japanese federation despite feeling something was wrong with her left hip. By the end of the camp, she could no longer use her leg properly. She was diagnosed with slipped capital femoral epiphysis, a rare medical condition; her doctors told her parents she might not walk properly again. She was unable to return to competition for two years.

She qualified to the 2012 Japan Junior Championships, where she placed 10th; the next year, she placed 4th, qualifying her to the senior championships for the first time. At the senior championships, she finished in 8th and earned the Rookie of the Year Award. In March, she won the Coupe du Printemps.

Around this time period, she began alternating between extreme diets to lose weight and overeating, which interfered with her menstrual cycle and led to significant mental stress.

The next year, at the 2014–15 Japan Championships, she placed 8th as well. In February, she won the Bavarian Open.

Later in 2015, Kihara made her only appearance on the Grand Prix series at the 2015 NHK Trophy, where she finished in 10th. She later described this period as, "My life was grueling. I was dying to get away from skating." She struggled to balance her demanding schoolwork with skating and to fit in both at school, where she often arrived late and left early to train, and the rink, where there were few others her age. Although she wanted to quit, or to move to another coaching team, her parents told her keep with her training team until she finished high school, after which she could consider going abroad.

In April 2016, she won the Triglav Trophy. She enrolled in Doshisha University but soon took leave, as in May, she moved to Montreal to train alongside Canadian men. Kihara explained the move by saying that she had begun to struggle with self-esteem while training with younger skaters in her previous training group. Coached by Bruno Marcotte, Kihara found her new training environment helped her mentally. She was especially inspired by her choreographer, Julie Marcotte.

In 2017, Kihara finished in 7th place at the 2017 Winter Universiade. She placed 15th at the 2017–18 Japan Championships, and she announced her retirement in December 2017.

== Post-competitive career ==
Kihara had long had an interest in choreography. After she finished her competitive career, she began training as a choreographer under Sachiko Kozuka. She studies not only other figure skating choreography but theater productions, particularly Shiki Theatre Company and Broadway theatre productions.

In 2023, she was a graduate student at Doshisha University, where she was studying relative energy deficiency in sport in figure skaters. As a skater, she experienced strict weight control, and she noticed her fellow competitors were also intensely focused on weight and food. In 2025, she enrolled in a registered dietitian program at Kyoto Women's University.

== Programs ==
Season	Short program	Free skating	Exhibition
2015–16	Sakura Sakura by Kennzaburou Hirai and Akira Miyagawa choreo. by Tom Dickson	Black Swan by Clint Mansell choreo. by Tom Dickson	Let's Get Loud by Jennifer Lopez
2014–15	Tango by Doug Wieselman; Tormenta by René Dupéré	Maria de Nazareth by Olivier Libouty; Dance of the Young Moorish Slaves (from Aida) by Giuseppe Verdi	

== Competitive highlights ==
GP: Grand Prix; CS: Challenger Series; JGP: Junior Grand Prix

International
Event	12–13	13–14	14–15	15–16	16–17	17–18
GP NHK Trophy				10th		
CS Autumn Classic					5th	
CS Nebelhorn				6th		
Bavarian Open			1st			
Coupe du Printemps		1st				
Triglav Trophy				1st		
Winter Universiade					7th	
International: Junior
JGP Czech Republic			4th			
JGP Hungary			6th			
National
Japan		8th	8th	10th	17th	15th
Japan Junior	10th	4th				
TBD = Assigned; WD = Withdrew
