= Riona Kato =

Japanese figure skater

Personal information
- Native name: 加藤利緒菜
- Born: February 7, 1998 (age 28) Osaka, Japan
- Height: 1.52 m (5 ft 0 in)

Figure skating career
- Country: Japan
- Coach: Yukari Kato, Anthony Liu
- Skating club: Nagaodani High School
- Began skating: 2001

Riona Kato (加藤 利緒菜, Katō Riona), born February 7, 1998) is a Japanese figure skater. She has won four senior international medals.

== Personal life ==
Riona Kato was born in Osaka, Japan. She trained in gymnastics as a child.

== Career ==
On the ice from the age of two years and eight months, Riona Kato was encouraged by her aunt, Yukari Kato, a skating coach. She debuted on the ISU Junior Grand Prix series in 2011.

In 2013, Kato began training in California, coached by Anthony Liu as well as her aunt. She won a bronze medal at the 2013 JGP in Slovakia. Her first senior international was the Triglav Trophy at the end of the 2013–14 season, where she placed 4th.

=== 2014–15 season ===
Kato began the 2014–15 season by winning two senior medals, silver at the Asian Trophy and bronze at a Challenger Series event, the U.S. Classic. Making her Grand Prix debut, she finished 5th at the 2014 NHK Trophy and earning a personal best of 117.51 in the freeskate. She then went on to finish 7th at the 2015 Japanese Championships.

=== 2015–16 season ===
For the 2015-16 Grand Prix series, Kato was assigned to compete at 2015 Rostelecom Cup.

She started her season by finishing 5th at the 2015 CS Ondrej Nepela Trophy.

== Programs ==
Season	Short program	Free skating	Exhibition
2018–2019	Miserlou by Caroline Campbell choreo. by Misha Ge	Violin Sonata No. 9 by Ludwig van Beethoven choreo. by Derrick Delmore	
2017–2018			
2016–2017			
2015–2016	Cherry on the Ice Wall (from Bahrein) by Princesses of Violin choreo. by Miki Sagakami, Phillip Mills	My Fair Lady by Frederick Loewe; Once Upon a Mattress by Mary Rodgers; I Could Have Danced All Night performed by Martine McCutcheon choreo. by Miki Sagakami, Phillip Mills	
2014–2015	The Flower Duet (from Lakmé) by Léo Delibes choreo. by Phillip Mills	Piano Concerto No. 3 by Sergei Rachmaninoff choreo. by Phillip Mills	The Show by Lenka
2013–2014	The Flower Duet (from Lakmé) by Léo Delibes choreo. by Phillip Mills	Elizabeth: The Golden Age by Craig Armstrong and A. R. Rahman choreo. by Phillip Mills	
2011–2012	Salut d'Amour by Edward Elgar	In a Trance; 80's Anthem; Asturias (Leyenda) by Isaac Albéniz	

== Competitive highlights ==
GP: Grand Prix; CS: Challenger Series; JGP: Junior Grand Prix

International
Event	09–10	10–11	11–12	12–13	13–14	14–15	15–16	16–17	17–18	18–19
GP NHK Trophy						5th				
GP Rostelecom							10th			
CS Nepela Trophy							5th			
CS U.S. Classic						3rd				
CS Warsaw Cup								10th		
Asian Trophy						2nd	2nd			
Coupe Printemps						2nd				
Triglav Trophy					4th					
International: Junior
JGP Czech Rep.					4th					
JGP Latvia			11th							
JGP Slovakia					3rd					
Printemps				1st						
National
Japan Champ.				6th	13th	7th	20th		23rd	29th
Japan Jr. Champ.	7th	26th	25th	2nd	7th					
