= Miyu Nakashio =

Japanese figure skater

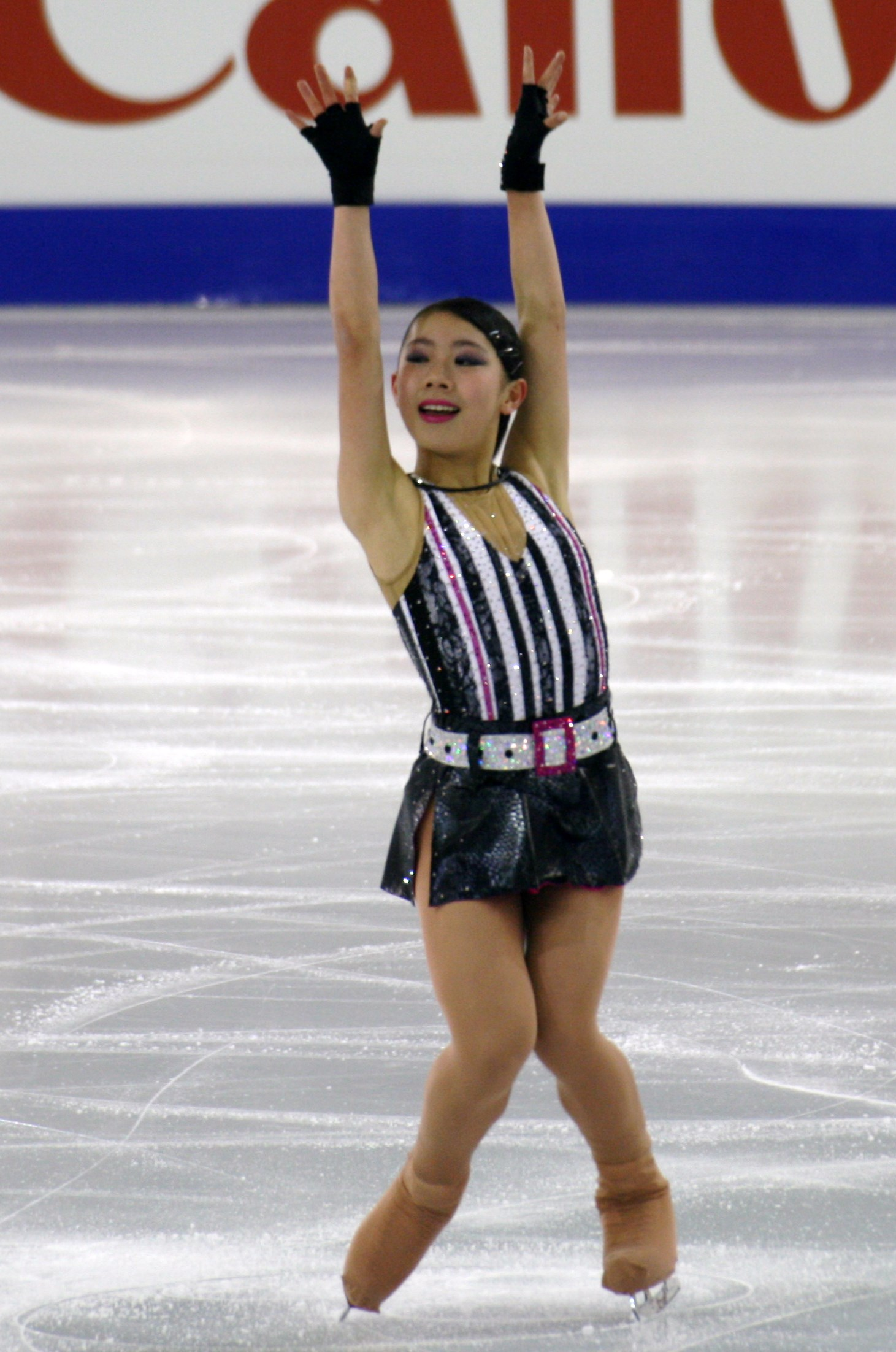
- Nakashio in December 2014

Personal information
- Native name: 中塩 美悠
- Born: October 21, 1996 (age 30) Hiroshima, Japan
- Height: 1.53 m (5 ft 0 in)

Figure skating career
- Country: Japan
- Coach: Azumi Hata, Emi Nakayuki, Emi Kikkawa
- Skating club: Hiroshima SC
- Began skating: 2004

Miyu Nakashio (born October 21, 1996) is a Japanese figure skater. She won gold at the 2014 ISU Junior Grand Prix in Estonia. Making her senior international debut, she won the gold medal at the Triglav Trophy in April 2015.

== Programs ==
Season	Short program	Free skating
2018–19	Time to say goodbye by Francesco Sartori choreo. by Rohene Ward	Titanic by James Horner choreo. by Akiko Suzuki
2017–18		
2016–17		
2015–16	Gopher Mambo by Yma Sumac choreo. by Kenji Miyamoto	Scheherazade by Nikolai Rimsky-Korsakov choreo. by Nanami Abe
2014–15	Fosse choreo. by Nanami Abe	Tango de los Exilados by Vanessa-Mae, Walter Taieb choreo. by Rie Arikawa

== Competitive highlights ==
GP: Grand Prix; CS: Challenger Series; JGP: Junior Grand Prix

International
Event	08–09	09–10	10–11	11–12	12–13	13–14	14–15	15–16	16–17	17–18	18–19
GP Skate America								11th			
CS Warsaw Cup									4th		
Lombardia Trophy								3rd			
Triglav Trophy							1st				
International: Junior
JGP Final							6th				
JGP Estonia							1st				
JGP France							4th				
Asian Trophy							4th J				
National
Japan					15th	11th	10th		21st	28th	22nd
Japan Junior			21st	15th							
Japan Novice	23rd A										
J = Junior level
