= Akio Sasaki =

Japanese former figure skater (born 1991)

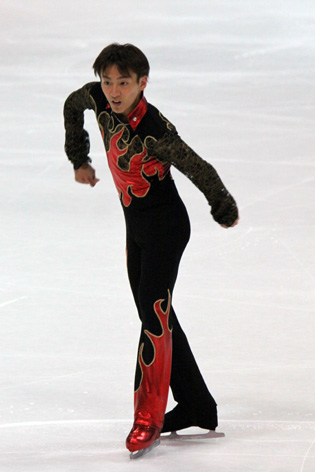
- Sasaki in 2009.

Personal information
- Born: 19 March 1991 (age 35) Yokohama, Japan
- Height: 1.62 m (5 ft 4 in)

Figure skating career
- Country: Japan
- Coach: Akiko Sato
- Skating club: Meiji University
- Began skating: 1997
Medal record
Representing Japan
Figure skating: Men's singles
Winter Universiade
Bronze medal – third place	2013 Trentino	Men's singles
Asian Figure Skating Trophy
Gold medal – first place	2010 Bangkok	Men's singles

Akio Sasaki (佐々木 彰生, Sasaki Akio; born March 19, 1991) is a Japanese former figure skater. He is the 2010 Ondrej Nepela Memorial champion, 2010 Asian Trophy champion, and 2013 Winter Universiade bronze medalist.

He began skating at the Kanagawa Ice Rink with his brother.

== Programs ==
Season	Short program	Free skating
2012–2013	Voodoo People by The Prodigy	Gypsy Dance
2011–2012	Japanese Dance No. 5 (based on Hungarian Dance No. 5); Typewriter	Spokey Dokey; Akio's Boogie and Pakapaka Mokuba
2009–2010	Black Bottom by Spike Jones	Rodrigo Solo by Rogrigo Y Gabriela; Stairway To Heaven by Jimmy Page, Robert Plant; Tamacun by Rodrigo Y Gabriela
2007–2008	La Zarzamora by Manuel Quiroga; Moliendo Café by Jose Manso	Robots by John Powell; Robots Overture; Bigweld TV; Train Station; Bigweld Workshop

== Competitive highlights ==
International
Event	00–01	01–02	02–03	03–04	04–05	05–06	06–07	07–08	08–09	09–10	10–11	11–12	12–13	13–14
Asian Trophy											1st			
Finlandia												11th		
Merano Cup												7th		
Nebelhorn										7th				
Nepela Memorial											1st			5th
Triglav Trophy													4th	
Universiade														3rd
International: Junior
Junior Worlds								17th						
JGP Croatia								4th						
JGP Czech Rep.									3rd					
JGP U.K.									7th					
JGP USA								13th						
National
Japan Champ.										9th	16th	14th	8th	13th
Japan Junior					22nd		6th	2nd	5th					
Japan Novice	6th B	2nd B	10th A	4th A										
JGP: Junior Grand Prix; J. = Junior-level
