= Rena Uezono =

Japanese figure skater (born 2010)

Personal information
- Native name: 上薗 恋奈
- Born: June 7, 2010 (age 16) Aichi, Japan
- Home town: Nagoya
- Height: 1.63 m (5 ft 4 in)

Figure skating career
- Country: Japan
- Coach: Sonoko Nakano; Mitsuko Graham; Sei Kawahara; Masahiro Kawagoe
- Skating club: Kobe FSC
- Began skating: 2017

Medal record
World Junior Championships
Bronze medal – third place	2024 Taipei	Singles
Junior Grand Prix Final
Bronze medal – third place	2023–24 Beijing	Singles

Rena Uezono (上薗 恋奈, Uezono Rena; born June 7, 2010) is a Japanese figure skater. She is the 2024 World Junior bronze medalist, the 2023–24 ISU Junior Grand Prix Final bronze medalist, the 2023 JGP Poland champion, the 2023 JGP Turkey silver medalist, and the 2023–24 Japan Junior bronze medalist.

== Personal life ==
Uezono was born on 7 June 2010 in Aichi, Japan.

Her figure skating idols are Mao Asada, Yuna Kim, and Yuzuru Hanyu. In addition to figure skating, Uezono's hobbies include playing the piano, cooking, and fashion/

In 2026, Uezono enrolled at Chukyo University Chukyo High School.

== Career ==
Uezono began skating in 2017 at the age of seven after being inspired by watching Mao Asada perform at an ice show in her home region of Aichi.

She won the silver medal at the 2020 Japanese National Novice Championships in the novice B category.

=== 2021–22 season ===
Uezono placed fifth at the 2021 Japanese National Novice A Championships and was invited to compete at the 2021–22 Japan Junior National Championships. She finished in eighteenth place after two falls in the free skate. Following the season, Uezono joined Mihoko Higuchi's newly founded skating club, the LYS Skate Club. In turn, Higuchi began coaching her as well.<ref=GS24/>

=== 2022–23 season ===
Uezono won the 2022 Japan National Novice A Championships, 15.77 points above Mayuko Oka, and was again invited to compete at the 2022–23 Japan Junior Championships. After a clean short program, Uezono placed in eleventh. However, two falls in the free skate dropped her to the thirteenth place.

She was invited to skate in the gala at the 2023 World Team Trophy.

=== 2023–24 season: World Junior Championships & Junior Grand Prix Final bronzes ===
As the reigning national novice champion, Uezono was selected to make her international competitive debut on the Junior Grand Prix at the 2023 JGP Turkey. Fourth in the short program, she moved up to second overall after the free skate, taking the silver medal. Weeks later she won gold at the 2023 JGP Poland, in the processing qualifying to the Junior Grand Prix Final.

Based on her prior results, Uezono was considered a podium contender at the 2023–24 Japan Junior Championships. She won the bronze medal, in the process qualifying to the senior national championships. Next appearing at the Junior Grand Prix Final in Beijing, Uezono finished third in both segments and claimed the bronze medal there as well. She set new personal bests in both segments and overall. She then competed at the senior national championships at month's end, finishing fourth, less than two points back of bronze medalist Mao Shimada. Uezono described skating in the final group of the free skate as "very nerve-wracking, but I was able to skate with the best skaters and that was a good experience."

Uezono finished the season at the 2024 World Junior Championships in Taipei. In the short program, she fell on her jump combination and finished in eighth place. She rallied in the free skate, coming third in that segment with a new personal best, and rising to third place overall.

=== 2024–25 season ===
Uezono began her season on the Junior Grand Prix by competing at 2024 JGP Czech Republic, entering as the pre-event favourite. She placed second in the short program but fourth free skate after falling twice during her free program. She would drop to a disappointing fourth place overall. She went on to place fourth again at 2024 JGP Slovenia.

In late November, Uezono competed at the 2024–25 Japan Junior Championships, where she finished fifth. This result ensured her qualification to compete at the senior championships, where she placed twenty-sixth, failing to advance to the free skate segment of the competition.

=== 2025–26 season: Struggles ===
In July, it was announced that Uezono had relocated to Kobe and joined the Kobe Figure Skating Club, where she was now being coached by Sonoko Nakano.

In late November, Uezono competed at the 2025–26 Japan Junior Championships, where she finished in twentieth place overall.

2026–27 season

Uezono started season by competiting at 2026 JGP Thailand where she ended up eighth place. Then, she competed at 2026-27 Japan Junior Championships where she placed twenty eighth in the short program segment, hence failing to qualify for free skate and finished 28th overall.

== Programs ==
Season	Short program	Free skating	Exhibition
2026–2027	The Seed by AURORA choreo. by Kana Muramoto	Romeo and Juliet; Romeo and Juliet: Suite (A Time For Us) by Nino Rota, Cliff Eidelman, & Royal Scottish National Orchestra; Romeo and Juliet (What is a Youth?) by Royal Philharmonic Orchestra; Romeo and Juliet: Theme by Royal Philharmonic Orchestra & Carl Davis choreo. by Misha Ge	
2025–2026	Take the "A" Train by Billy Strayhorn performed by Nikki Yanofsky choreo. by Kana Muramoto	Romeo and Juliet; Romeo and Juliet: Suite (A Time For Us) by Nino Rota, Cliff Eidelman, & Royal Scottish National Orchestra; Romeo and Juliet (What is a Youth?) by Royal Philharmonic Orchestra; Romeo and Juliet: Theme by Royal Philharmonic Orchestra & Carl Davis choreo. by Misha Ge	Soft Universe by AURORA choreo. by Kana Muramoto
2024–2025	Voilà by Barbara Pravi choreo. by Mihoko Higuchi	Prelude in C-sharp minor by Sergei Rachmaninoff; Chronos by Kirill Richter choreo. by Mihoko Higuchi	The King's Affirmation by Imiko; Scream & Shout by will.i.am ft. Britney Spears
2023–2024	New Moon (The Meadow) (from The Twilight Saga: New Moon) by Alexandre Desplat; F for You by Disclosure & Mary J. Blige choreo. by Mihoko Higuchi	Pray (from Game of Thrones) by Matt Bellamy & Dan Weiss; Mechanisms by Kirill Richter choreo. by Mihoko Higuchi	Come Around Me; Sorry by Justin Bieber choreo. by Mihoko Higuchi
2022–2023	New Moon (The Meadow) (from The Twilight Saga: New Moon) by Alexandre Desplat; F for You by Disclosure & Mary J. Blige choreo. by Mihoko Higuchi	Backstage Romance (from Moulin Rouge!) by Ricky Rojas & Robyn Hurder choreo. by Mihoko Higuchi	New Moon (The Meadow) (from The Twilight Saga: New Moon) by Alexandre Desplat; F for You by Disclosure & Mary J. Blige choreo. by Mihoko Higuchi; Come Around Me; Sorry by Justin Bieber choreo. by Mihoko Higuchi

== Competitive highlights ==
- JGP – Event of the ISU Grand Prix Series
- TBD – Assigned
- WD – Withdrew from competition

Competition placements at senior level
Season	2023–24	2024–25	2025-26
Japan Championships	4th	26th	

Competition placements at junior level
Season	2021–22	2022–23	2023–24	2024–25	2025–26	2026–27
World Junior Championships			3rd			
Junior Grand Prix Final			3rd			
Japan Championships	18th	13th	3rd	5th	20th	28th
JGP Czech Republic				4th		
JGP Poland			1st			
JGP Slovenia				4th		
JGP Thailand						8th
JGP Turkey			2nd			

== Detailed results ==
ISU personal best scores in the +5/-5 GOE System
Segment	Type	Score	Event
Total	TSS	196.46	2023–2024 JGP Final
Short program	TSS	67.87	2023–2024 JGP Final
Short program	TES	38.79	2023–2024 JGP Final
Short program	PCS	29.08	2023–2024 JGP Final
Free skating	TSS	132.74	2024 World Junior Championships
Free skating	TES	71.73	2024 World Junior Championships
Free skating	PCS	61.01	2024 World Junior Championships

=== Senior level ===
2024–25 season
Date	Event	SP	FS	Total
December 19–22, 2024	2024–25 Japan Championships	26; 48.08	-	26; 48.08
2023–24 season
Date	Event	SP	FS	Total
December 20–24, 2023	2023–24 Japan Championships	6; 66.22	4; 134.47	4; 200.69

=== Junior level ===
2025–26 season
Date	Event	SP	FS	Total
22–24 November 2025	2025–26 Japan Junior Championships	13; 53.20	23; 78.22	20; 131.42
2024–25 season
Date	Event	SP	FS	Total
November 15–17, 2024	2024–25 Japan Junior Championships	10; 58.06	5; 122.63	5; 180.69
October 2–5, 2024	2024 JGP Slovenia	5; 63.09	4; 118.18	4; 181.27
September 4–9, 2024	2024 JGP Czech Republic	2; 64.41	4; 112.90	4; 177.31
2023–24 season
Date	Event	SP	FS	Total
February 26–March 3, 2024	2024 World Junior Championships	8; 61.96	3; 132.74	3; 194.70
December 7–10, 2023	2023–24 JGP Final	3; 67.87	3; 128.59	3; 196.46
November 17–19, 2023	2023–24 Japan Junior Championships	6; 60.95	2; 125.56	3; 186.51
September 27–30, 2023	2023 JGP Poland	2; 64.85	1; 127.46	1; 192.31
September 6–9, 2023	2023 JGP Turkey	4; 63.64	2; 124.07	2; 187.71
2022–23 season
Date	Event	SP	FS	Total
November 25–27, 2022	2022–23 Japan Junior Championships	11; 56.17	16; 92.82	13; 148.99
2021–22 season
Date	Event	SP	FS	Total
November 19–21, 2021	2021–22 Japan Junior Championships	20; 49.32	18; 86.73	18; 136.05
