= Kaori Sakamoto =

Japanese figure skater (born 2000)

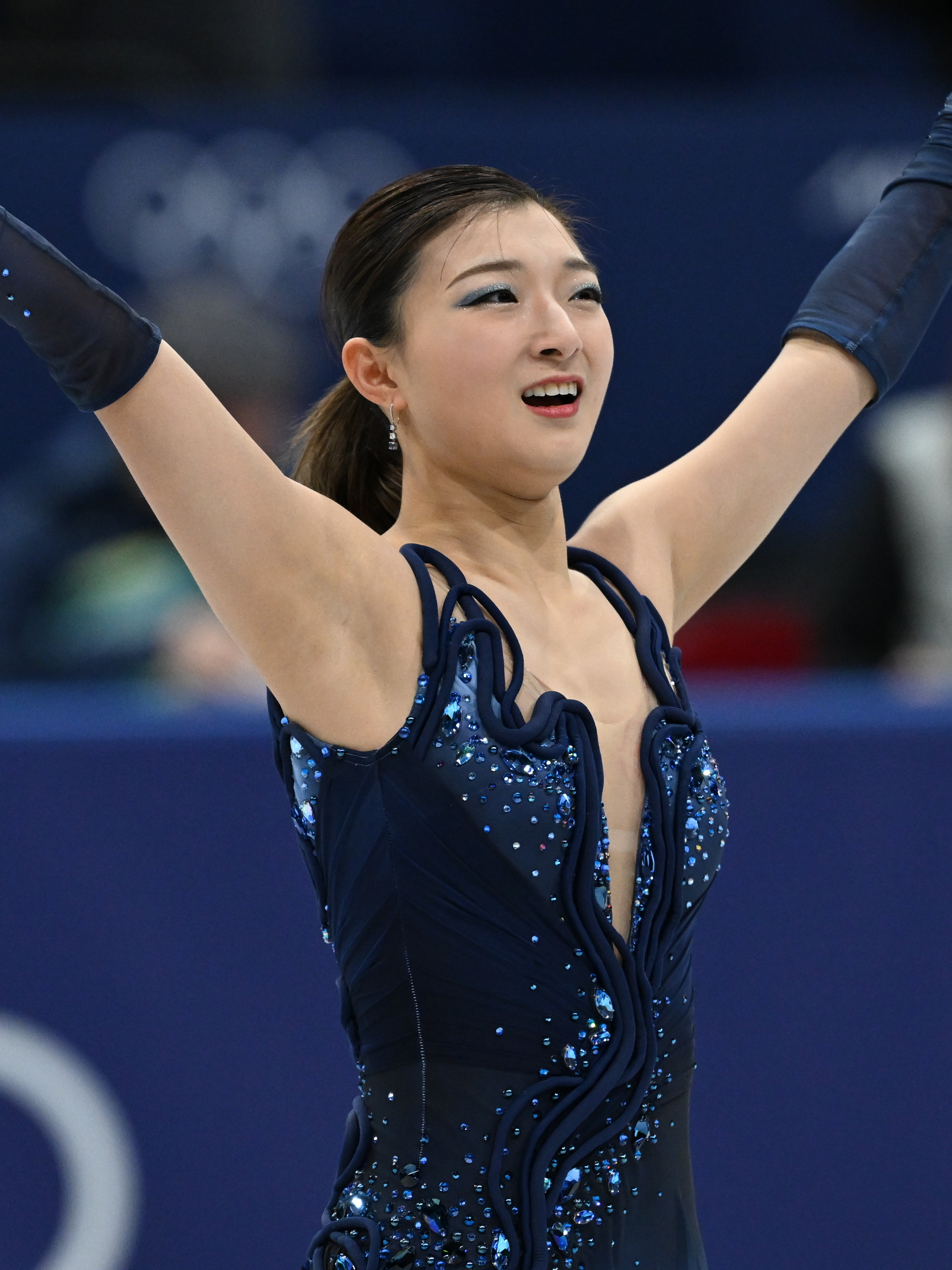
- Sakamoto following her short program at the 2026 Winter Olympics

Personal information
- Native name: 坂本花織
- Born: April 9, 2000 (age 26) Kobe, Japan
- Height: 1.59 m (5 ft 3 in)

Figure skating career
- Country: Japan
- Discipline: Women's singles
- Coach: Sonoko Nakano; Mitsuko Graham; Sei Kawahara
- Skating club: Sysmex Kobe
- Began skating: 2004
- Retired: March 27, 2026
- Highest WS: 1st (2022–2026)

Medal record
| Event | Gold medal – first place | Silver medal – second place | Bronze medal – third place |
| Olympic Games | 0 | 3 | 1 |
| World Championships | 4 | 1 | 0 |
| Four Continents Championships | 1 | 0 | 0 |
| Grand Prix Final | 1 | 0 | 2 |
| Japan Championships | 6 | 2 | 0 |
| World Team Trophy | 0 | 2 | 2 |
| World Junior Championships | 0 | 0 | 1 |
| Junior Grand Prix Final | 0 | 0 | 1 |
Medal list
Olympic Games
| Silver medal – second place | 2022 Beijing | Team |
| Silver medal – second place | 2026 Milano Cortina | Team |
| Silver medal – second place | 2026 Milano Cortina | Singles |
| Bronze medal – third place | 2022 Beijing | Singles |
World Championships
| Gold medal – first place | 2022 Montpellier | Singles |
| Gold medal – first place | 2023 Saitama | Singles |
| Gold medal – first place | 2024 Montreal | Singles |
| Gold medal – first place | 2026 Prague | Singles |
| Silver medal – second place | 2025 Boston | Singles |
Four Continents Championships
| Gold medal – first place | 2018 Taipei | Singles |
Grand Prix Final
| Gold medal – first place | 2023–24 Beijing | Singles |
| Bronze medal – third place | 2024–25 Grenoble | Singles |
| Bronze medal – third place | 2025–26 Nagoya | Singles |
Japan Championships
| Gold medal – first place | 2018–19 Osaka | Singles |
| Gold medal – first place | 2021–22 Saitama | Singles |
| Gold medal – first place | 2022–23 Osaka | Singles |
| Gold medal – first place | 2023–24 Nagano | Singles |
| Gold medal – first place | 2024–25 Osaka | Singles |
| Gold medal – first place | 2025–26 Tokyo | Singles |
| Silver medal – second place | 2017–18 Tokyo | Singles |
| Silver medal – second place | 2020–21 Nagano | Singles |
World Team Trophy
| Silver medal – second place | 2019 Fukuoka | Team |
| Silver medal – second place | 2025 Tokyo | Team |
| Bronze medal – third place | 2021 Osaka | Team |
| Bronze medal – third place | 2023 Tokyo | Team |
World Junior Championships
| Bronze medal – third place | 2017 Taipei | Singles |
Junior Grand Prix Final
| Bronze medal – third place | 2016–17 Marseille | Singles |

Kaori Sakamoto (坂本花織, Sakamoto Kaori; born April 9, 2000) is a Japanese retired figure skater. She is the 2026 Olympic silver medalist, 2022 Olympic bronze medalist, a two-time Olympic team event silver medalist (2022, 2026), (Note: On 29 January 2024 CAS disqualified Valieva for four years retroactive to 25 December 2021 for an anti-doping rule violation. On 30 January 2024 the ISU reallocated medals to upgrade the United States to gold and Japan to silver while downgrading ROC to bronze.) a four-time World champion (2022–2024, 2026), the 2025 World silver medalist, the 2018 Four Continents champion, the 2023–24 Grand Prix Final champion, two-time Grand Prix Final bronze medalist (2024–25, 2025–26), a thirteen-time ISU Grand Prix medalist, the 2025 Asian Winter Games silver medalist, the 2023 World University Games silver medalist, and a six-time Japanese national champion. At the junior level, she is the 2017 World Junior bronze medalist and the 2016–17 Junior Grand Prix Final bronze medalist.

She is the first Japanese woman to win the World Championships since Mao Asada in 2014, the first Japanese skater to win three consecutive World titles in any discipline, the first woman to win three consecutive World titles since Peggy Fleming (1966–1968), the first woman since Michelle Kwan to win four World titles, the first and only Japanese skater in any discipline to win four World titles, and the only women's singles skater from Japan to compete at three Olympic Winter Games.

== Personal life ==
Kaori Sakamoto was born on 9 April 2000 in Kobe, Hyōgo, Japan. The decision for Sakamoto to become a figure skater was made with her family at an early age. Before Pyeongchang Olympics, she had heart surgery in July 2017 due to arrhythmia. She graduated from Kobe Gakuin University in September 2023.

Sakamoto was awarded the Kobe City Sports Special Award in August 2023 for becoming a two-time World Figure Skating Champion. Sakamoto prefers to use white Edea skates in the Ice Fly model with traditional silver blades.

On 12 May 2026, Sakamoto announced during a press conference that she had gotten married the previous week to a man that previously attended Kobe Gakuin University with her.

In addition to figure skating, her hobbies are swimming and completing jigsaw puzzles.

== Career ==
=== Early years ===
Sakamoto began learning to skate on November 18, 2003, in Kobe and has been with her coaches Sonoko Nakano, Mitsuko Graham, and Sei Kawahara since starting.

She won the gold medal at the 2012–13 Japan Novice Championships and placed 8th at the Japan Junior Championships in the same year. She was invited to skate in the gala at the 2013 World Team Trophy.

=== Junior career ===
==== 2013–2014 season: International junior debut ====
During the 2013–2014 season, Sakamoto debuted on the ISU Junior Grand Prix (JGP) circuit, placing sixth in Ostrava, Czech Republic. She finished eighth at the Japan Junior Championships.

==== 2014–2015 season ====
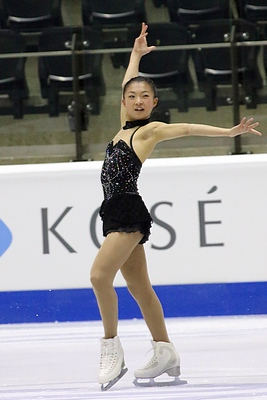
Sakamoto at the 2015 World Junior Championships

Sakamoto started her season by finishing seventh at her JGP event in Aichi, Japan. She won the Japanese national silver medal on the junior level before placing sixth on the senior level at the 2014–15 Japan Championships. Those results gave her a spot to compete at the 2015 World Junior Championships, where she placed fourth in the short program and 6th in the free skate to place sixth overall.

==== 2015–2016 season ====
Sakamoto began her season by winning the silver medal at her JGP event in Riga, Latvia, and finishing fourth at her JGP event in Toruń, Poland. Due to a stress fracture in her right shinbone, she stayed off the ice in October and resumed skating without jumps in November. At the Japanese Championships, she placed fifth competing in the junior event and thirteenth on the senior level. Sakamoto was selected to compete at the 2016 Winter Youth Olympics. She placed fifth in the short program and sixth in the free skate to finish sixth overall.

==== 2016–2017 season: World Junior bronze ====
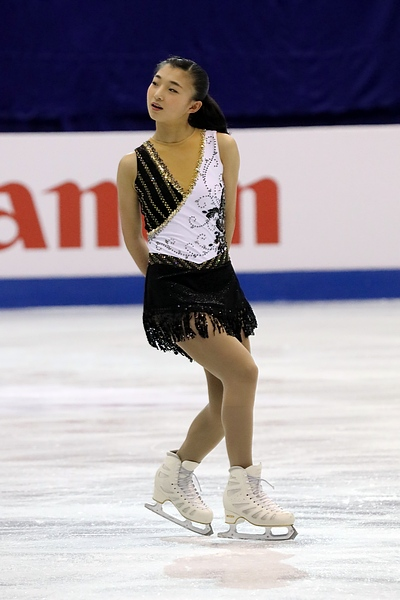
Sakamoto at the 2017 World Junior Championships

Sakamoto received medals at both of her 2016–17 JGP assignments – silver in France and gold in Japan – and then won the Japanese junior title. In December, she took the bronze medal at the Junior Grand Prix Final in Marseille, France, and placed seventh, competing on the senior level at the Japan Championships. She was assigned to replace the injured Satoko Miyahara at the 2017 Asian Winter Games but withdrew due to the flu. She went on to win bronze at the 2017 World Junior Championships. She was invited to skate in the gala at the 2017 World Team Trophy as the junior world bronze medalist.

=== Senior career ===
==== 2017–2018 season: Four Continents champion and Pyeongchang Olympics ====
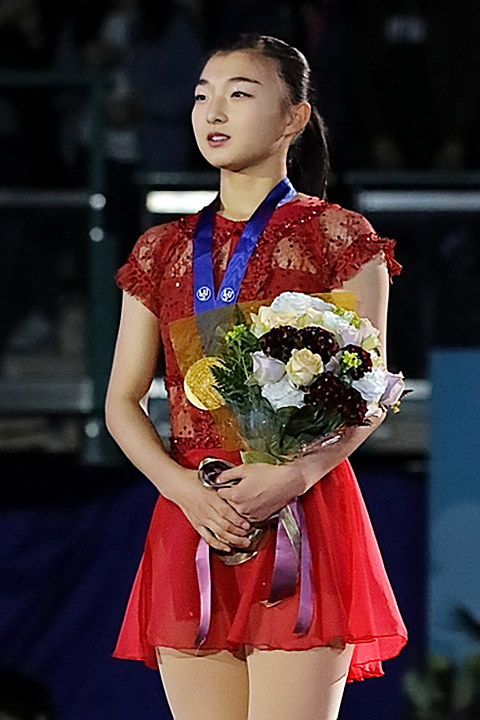
Sakamoto at the 2018 Four Continents Championships

Sakamoto started her first full senior season at the 2017 Asian Figure Skating Trophy, placing first in both segments to take the gold. At the 2017 U.S Classic, she placed fifth in the short program and 4th in the free skate to place fourth overall, behind compatriot and gold medalist Marin Honda. Making her senior Grand Prix debut, she finished 5th at the 2017 Rostelecom Cup after placing fourth in the short program and fifth in the free skate. At the 2017 Skate America, she scored new personal best scores for both segments of the competition; she placed second in both the short program and free skate and won the silver medal overall behind teammate Satoko Miyahara.

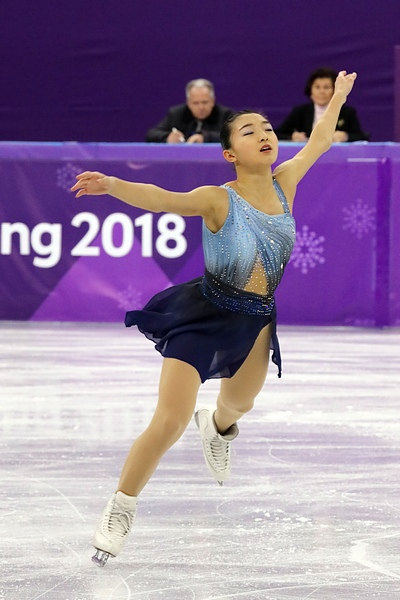
Sakamoto at the 2018 Winter Olympics

Sakamoto won the short program at the 2017–18 Japan Figure Skating Championships. In the free skate, she placed fourth and won the silver medal, her first senior national medal. Following the competition, the Japan Skating Federation named Sakamoto to Japan's team to the 2018 Winter Olympics, alongside Satoko Miyahara. Sakamoto was named in Japan's team to the 2018 Four Continents Championships with Miyahara and training-mate Mai Mihara. She was also selected as the first alternate for the 2018 World Championships, behind Miyahara and Wakaba Higuchi.

At the 2018 Four Continents Championships, Sakamoto placed second in the short program with a new personal best score behind teammate Satoko Miyahara. Sakamoto won the free skate with another personal best score and the championship, leading a Japanese sweep of the podium.

Sakamoto competed in the ladies free skating portion of the Team Event at the 2018 Winter Olympics. She placed fifth individually and fifth overall within Team Japan. In the ladies' singles competition, Sakamoto skated a new personal best short program and was fifth going into the free skate. In the free skate, Sakamoto made minor mistakes but still was able to post the sixth-highest free skating score of the event and ended in sixth place overall.

Post-Olympics, Sakamoto competed at the 2018 Coupe du Printemps. In the short program, she placed first. In the free skate, she fell on the second jump of a planned double axel-triple toe loop-double toe loop combination and doubled a planned triple loop to place second in the segment. She ended the competition second overall behind compatriot Mai Mihara.

==== 2018–2019 season: First national title ====
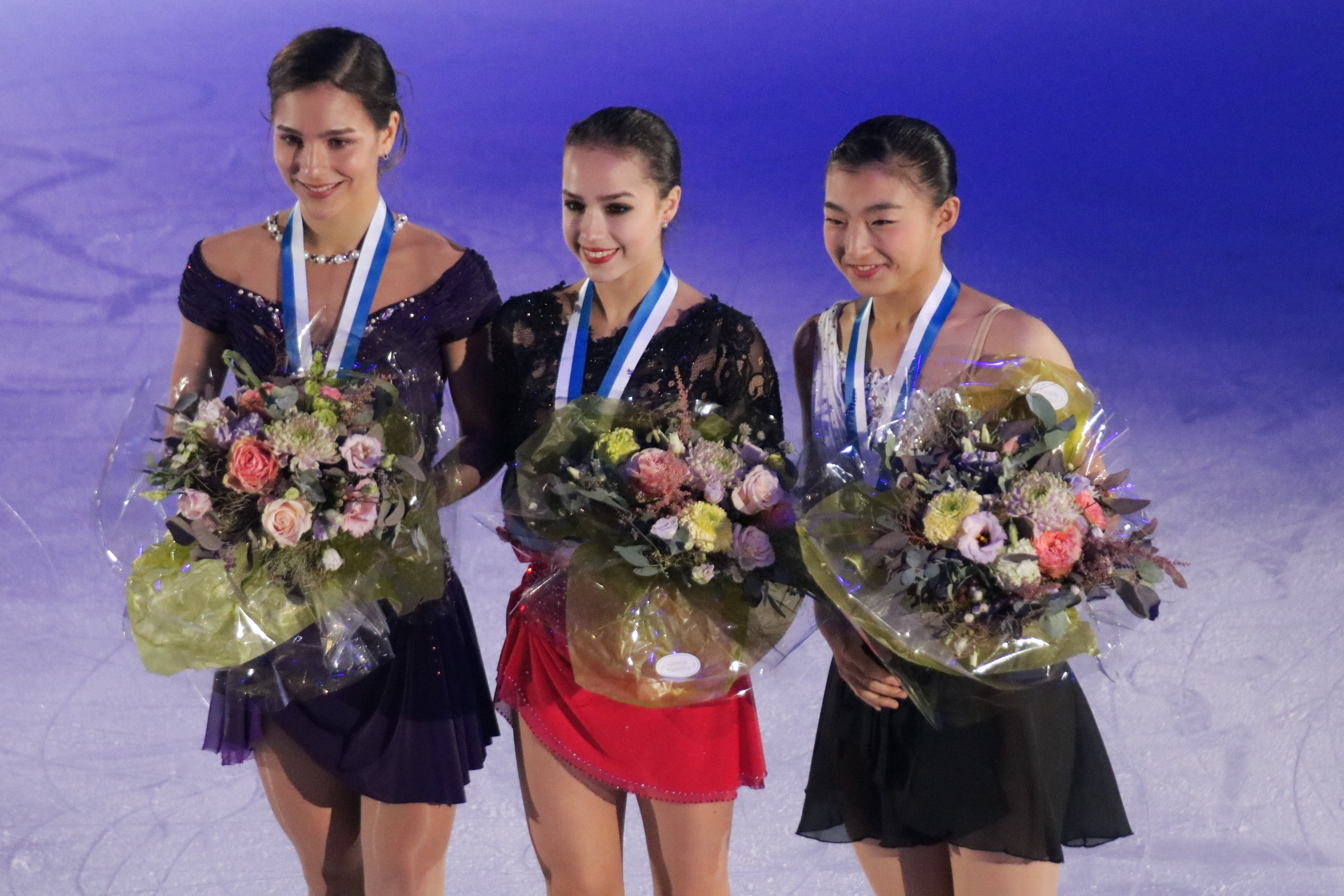
Sakamoto (right) with Alina Zagitova (center) and Stanislava Konstantinova (left) at the 2018 Grand Prix of Helsinki podium

Sakamoto began the season at the 2018 CS Lombardia Trophy, where a disastrous short program left her in ninth place going into the free skate. She placed second in the free skate, rebounding to fourth place overall. Subsequently, Sakamoto indicated that she felt she had not had enough practice time before the event. Competing at the 2018 Skate America, she repeated as the silver medalist, again finishing behind compatriot Miyahara. She pronounced herself "satisfied" with the results. At her second event, the 2018 Grand Prix of Helsinki, Sakamoto fell twice in the short program, ending up in seventh place. She came second in the free skate to place third overall and remarked: "I gave it everything I had; that was the only chance I would have to make it to the podium today. I forgot about yesterday's program, and I just gave my best today."

At the 2018–19 Grand Prix Final, Sakamoto placed fourth in both segments, narrowly missing the podium after falling on the last part of her three-jump combination. She expressed happiness at her score, even with the error.

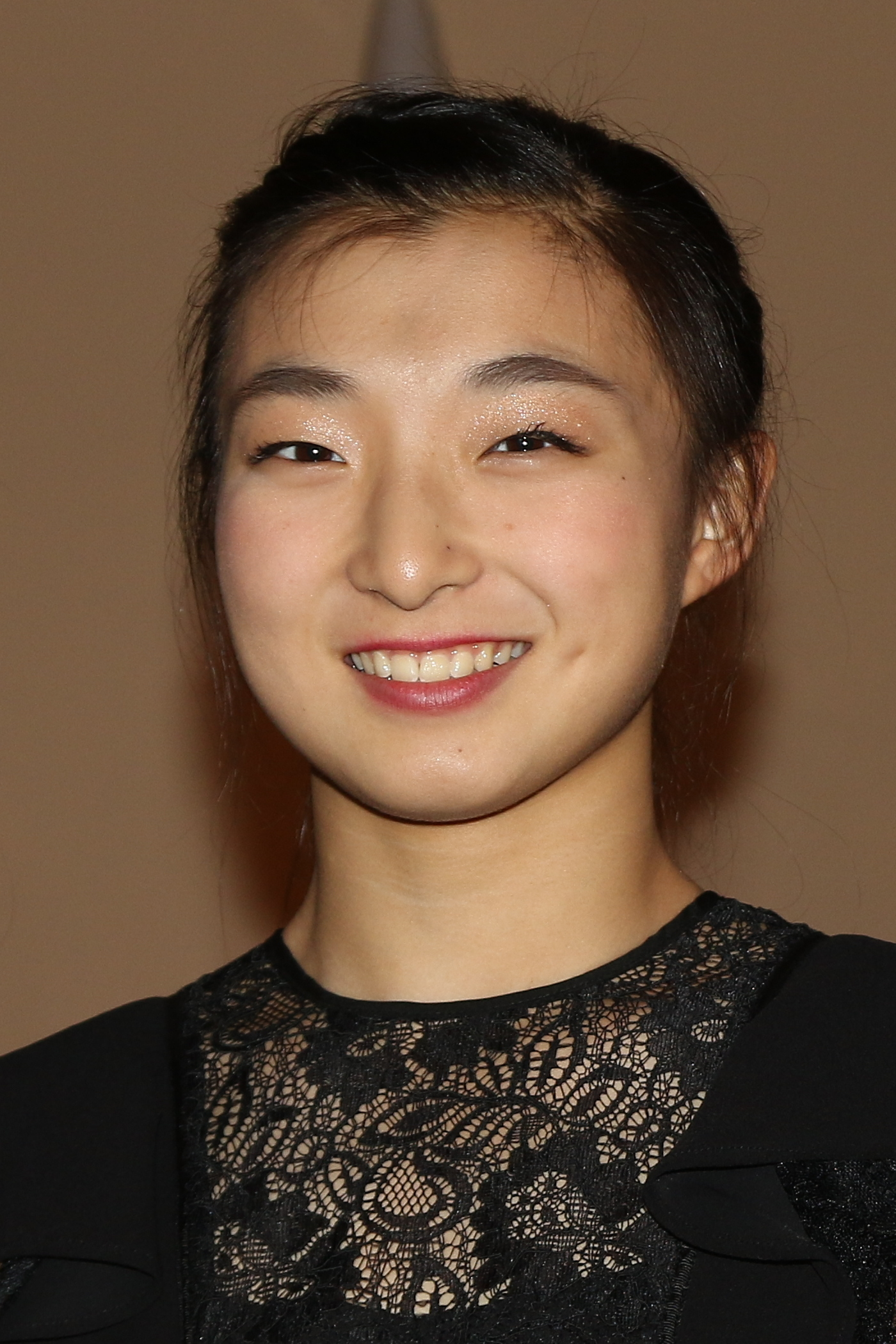
Sakamoto during the 2018–19 Grand Prix Final

Competing in the 2018 Japan Championships, Sakamoto placed second in the short program, slightly over a point behind Miyahara, the four-time defending champion. In the free skate, she again placed second, behind Rika Kihira, but placed ahead of Kihira in the overall points total to win the gold medal. In doing so, she became the first skater to place ahead of Kihira in senior competition. She was named to the Japanese teams for the 2019 Four Continents Championships and the 2019 World Championships.

At Four Continents, Sakamoto placed second in the short program with a new personal best, 0.55 points behind Bradie Tennell. In the free skate, she missed her three-jump combination when she popped the opening double Axel, and despite adding a double toe loop to her final jump, she lost several points as a result, and placed fourth in the free. She missed the podium overall by 0.33 points. She expressed frustration at the end, saying, "I was very nervous, and I missed some elements. It was such a disappointment, but I learned from this failure. I want to be stronger. At the World Championships, I want to put out the performance, both short and free, that is sharp and clean."

At the World Championships in Saitama, Sakamoto placed second in the short program, winning a silver small medal. In the free skate, a popped triple flip caused her to fall to fifth place overall. Sakamoto commented: "I still cannot figure out why I always cannot perform a perfect program, a performance without any mistakes." Sakamoto concluded the season at the 2019 World Team Trophy, where she won the silver medal as part of Team Japan.

==== 2019–2020 season: Struggles ====
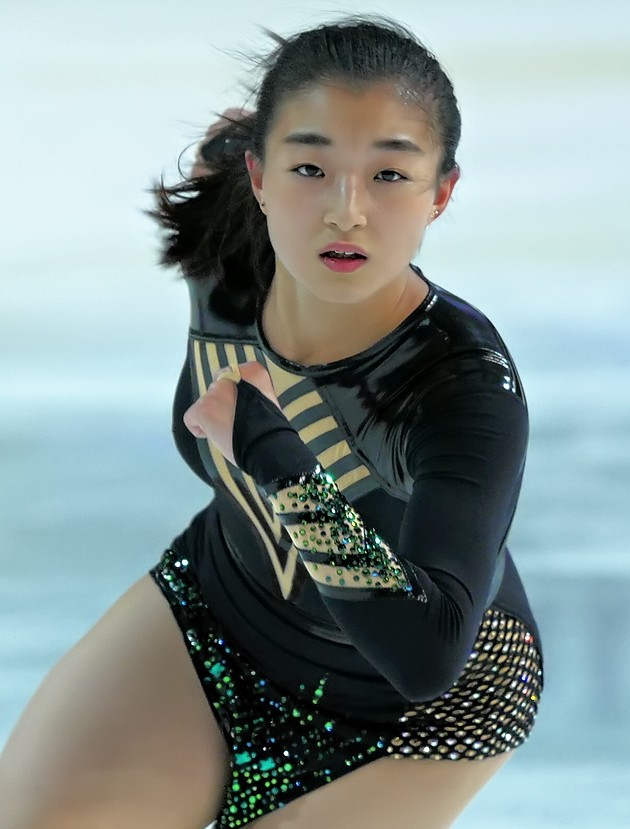
Sakamoto during practice at the 2019 Internationaux de France

Sakamoto began the season at the 2019 CS Ondrej Nepela Memorial, where she won the silver medal, her first Challenger medal.

Beginning on the Grand Prix at 2019 Skate America, Sakamoto placed second in the short program and fourth in the free skate after popping two of her jumps and finished the event fourth overall. Her second Grand-Prix event was the 2019 Internationaux de France, where she placed sixth in the short program after falling on a double Axel and putting a foot down on her triple loop. Sakamoto was fourth in the free skate, despite several under rotations, rising to fourth place overall.

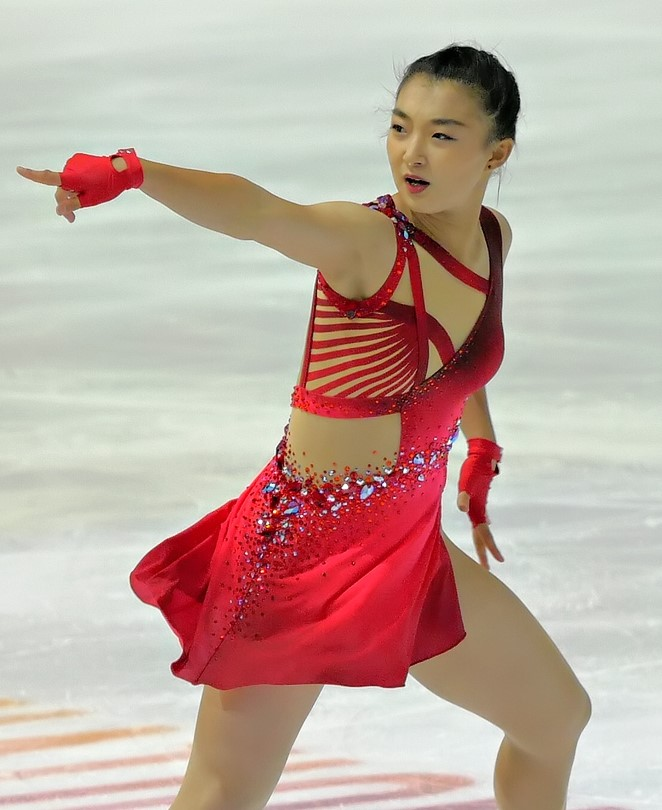
Sakamoto during her short program at the 2019 Internationaux de France

On the 2019–20 Japanese Championships, Sakamoto was third in the short program despite underrotating the back half of her jump combination and was narrowly behind second-place Satoko Miyahara. She struggled in the free skate, underrotating or downgrading five jumps, and falling once, placing seventh in that segment and dropping to sixth place overall. Commenting on her disappointing results afterward, she attributed much of her difficulty this season to the absence of her friend and longtime training partner Mai Mihara, who was sidelined from training due to illness: "But this year I could not fight by myself. I'm old enough now that I should be able to rely on myself."

Despite her sixth-place finish at the national championships, Sakamoto was assigned to compete at the 2020 Four Continents Championships, where she was fourth in the short program despite turning out of the landing on her triple loop. In the free skate, Sakamoto attempted a quad toe loop in competition for the first time but fell and had the jump deemed downgraded. Making several other errors, she dropped to fifth place overall. Speaking afterward, she said, "I couldn't fully trust myself. I'm glad I can use this experience and results as a learning experience for next season and future competitions."

==== 2020–2021 season: Grand Prix gold ====
Due to the COVID-19 pandemic, Sakamoto won both the Kinki Regional Championship and Western Sectionals to qualify for a spot at the national championships. Sakamoto began the international season at the 2020 NHK Trophy, which, to minimize international travel, was attended almost exclusively by Japanese skaters (the exception being You Young of South Korea). She won the short program, introducing the triple Lutz into that segment for the first time in five years. Skating a clean free skate, she won that segment by over twenty points, taking the gold medal by almost thirty. This was her first Grand Prix gold medal. Sakamoto attributed her improvement over the previous season in part to increased strength training facilitated by being off-ice during the pandemic.

At the 2020–21 Japan Championships, Sakamoto entered with the perceived momentum from her NHK Trophy win but faced the returning Rika Kihira, who had been scheduled to compete elsewhere on the Grand Prix that season. Sakamoto made an error in her short program, performing only a double toe loop instead of a planned triple as part of her jump combination, but ended up in second place, 7.48 points behind Kihira. Skating cleanly in the free; she remained in second behind Kihira, who successfully performed a quadruple Salchow.

Sakamoto was assigned to the Japanese team for the 2021 World Championships in Stockholm. Sakamoto placed sixth in the short program and fifth in the free skate finishing in the sixth place overall. Her placement combined with Kihira's seventh place qualified three Japanese ladies' berths at the 2022 Winter Olympics in Beijing. Subsequently, she was announced as part of the Japanese team for the 2021 World Team Trophy. She placed third in the short program and second in the free skate at the Trophy, while Team Japan won the bronze medal.

==== 2021–2022 season: Beijing Olympics and World champion ====
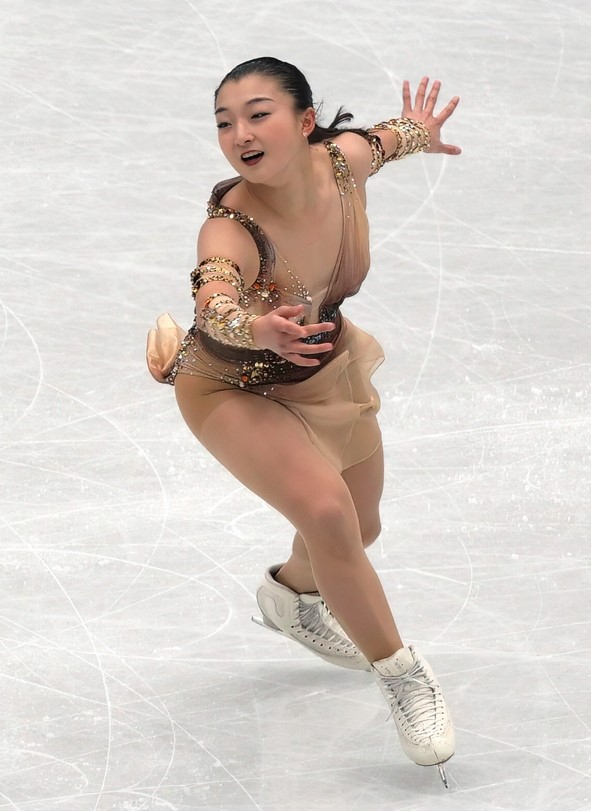
Sakamoto performing her short program at the 2022 World Championships

Sakamoto began the season at the Olympic test event, the 2021 CS Asian Open, where she won the silver medal. On the Grand Prix, she was once again assigned to Skate America, where she was fourth in the short program after doubling her planned triple flip jump. She was third in the free skate with no issues other than an edge call on her triple Lutz, but remained in fourth place overall, 1.04 points behind bronze medalist You Young. Sakamoto's second assignment was Japan's home event 2021 NHK Trophy, which she entered as the frontrunner due to injury-related withdrawals from both Alexandra Trusova and Daria Usacheva. She won both segments of the competition, her only flaws being edge calls on her triple Lutzes and an underrotated triple toe loop. She won her second consecutive gold at the NHK Trophy. Sakamoto's results qualified her to the Grand Prix Final, but it was subsequently cancelled due to restrictions prompted by the Omicron variant.

With Rika Kihira absent due to injury, Sakamoto entered the 2021–22 Japan Championships as the favourite for the national title. She skated cleanly to win both segments of the competition and her second gold medal, 12.28 points ahead of silver medalist Wakaba Higuchi. As a result of her victory, she was named to her second Japanese Olympic team.

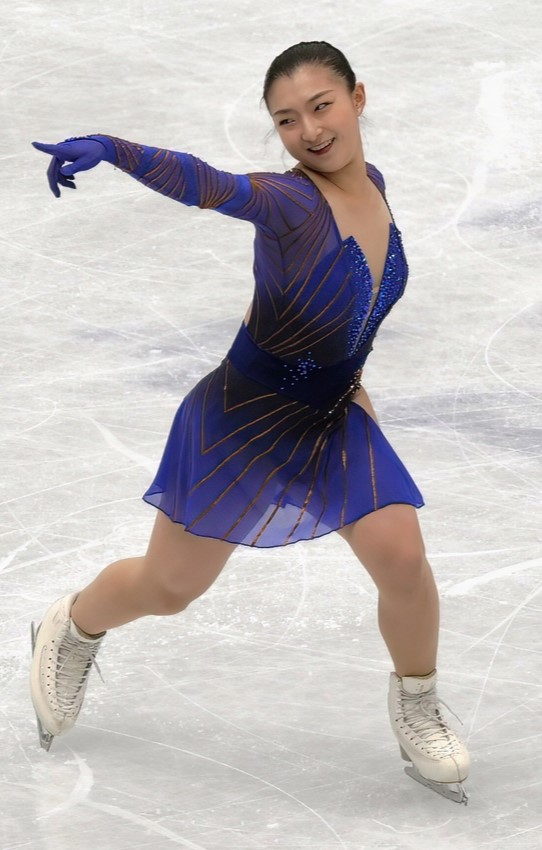
Kaori Sakamoto performing her free skate at the 2022 World Championships

Sakamoto began the 2022 Winter Olympics as the Japanese entry for the women's free skate segment of the Olympic team event. Skating cleanly, she placed second in the segment, albeit 30 points behind first place Kamila Valieva, taking nine points for Team Japan. Japan would win the bronze medal, making the team event podium for the first time and earning Sakamoto her first Olympic medal. In the women's event, Sakamoto skated a clean short program and earned a new personal best of 79.84, ranking third in the segment behind Valieva and Anna Shcherbakova. She said she was "quite satisfied" with the result and contrasted her prior Olympic experience at age 17 with "a lot of ups and downs in these four years" since. Despite placing third in the short program, it was widely assumed going into the free skate that Sakamoto would be passed by Alexandra Trusova, in fourth, whose technical content greatly exceeded hers. This occurred, despite a clean skate from Sakamoto that produced a new personal best score of 153.29. However, frontrunner Valieva faltered in the free skate and dropped to fourth place overall, resulting in Sakamoto winning the bronze medal. She was the fourth Japanese women's singles skater to win a medal at the Olympics and the first in twelve years since Mao Asada in 2010. Speaking afterward, she thanked her coaches for helping her through "very challenging and struggling years."

At the 2022 World Championships Sakamoto entered the championships as the heavy favorite to take the gold medal, since the Russian skaters had been excluded from the competition. Skating cleanly, she won the short program with a new personal best score of 80.32, 5.32 points clear of second-place Loena Hendrickx of Belgium. She went on to win the free skate as well, setting new personal bests in that segment (155.77) and total score (236.09), the latter nearly twenty points clear of silver medalist Hendrickx. She was Japan's first women's singles skater to win the World Championships since 2014. Sakamoto observed afterward that "four years ago, I didn't compete at the Worlds after the Olympic Games because I felt burned out. It wasn't easy to get ready for this just a month after the Games, but I'm glad I did. It was all worth it."

==== 2022–2023 season: Second consecutive World title ====
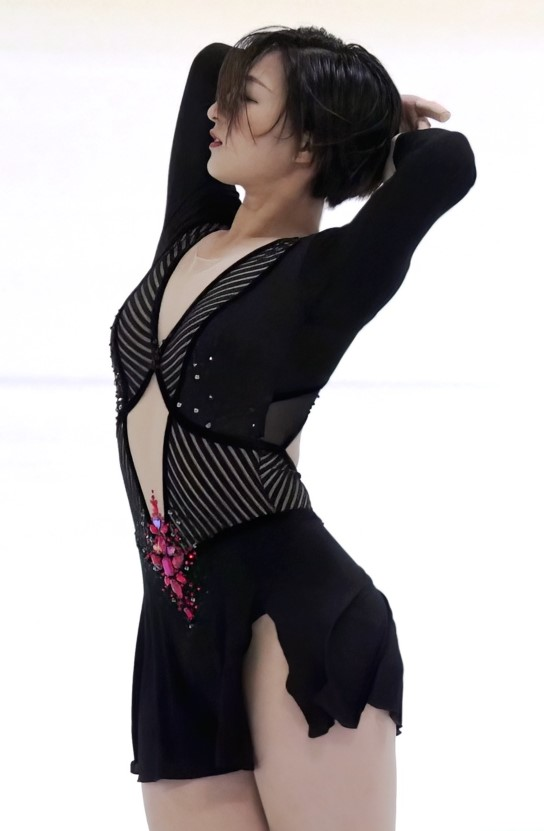
Sakamoto during her short program at the 2022 CS Lombardia Trophy

Sakamoto began the season at the 2022 CS Lombardia Trophy. She finished first in the short program but second in the free skate due to multiple errors, dropping to second place overall behind teammate Rinka Watanabe. At the 2022 Japan Open, she finished first in the women's free skate, helping Team Japan to the gold medal. She opened the Grand Prix series at her fifth Skate America competition. Narrowly first in the short program after performing only a triple-double combination, she won the free skate decisively over American Isabeau Levito to take the gold medal, a result she said left her "filled with joy." Her Janet Jackson medley short program earned praise from Jackson herself. Sakamoto entered the NHK Trophy as the two-time and reigning champion and the favorite for the title. She placed second in the short program, behind South Korea's Kim Ye-lim, after the technical panel deemed one jump underrotated, another a quarter short of rotation, and her Lutz edge unclear. She finished first in the free skate, despite two jumps being called a quarter short of rotation and popping her usually reliable triple loop jump into a single, but remained in second place overall behind Kim. Both women subsequently qualified for the Grand Prix Final. Reflecting on her disappointing result, Sakamoto remarked, "coming into this season, I really wanted to do my best. Inside myself, there were an angel and a devil fighting each other. I want to overcome the devil. It tells me: 'you gave your best last year; this season, you can relax.'"

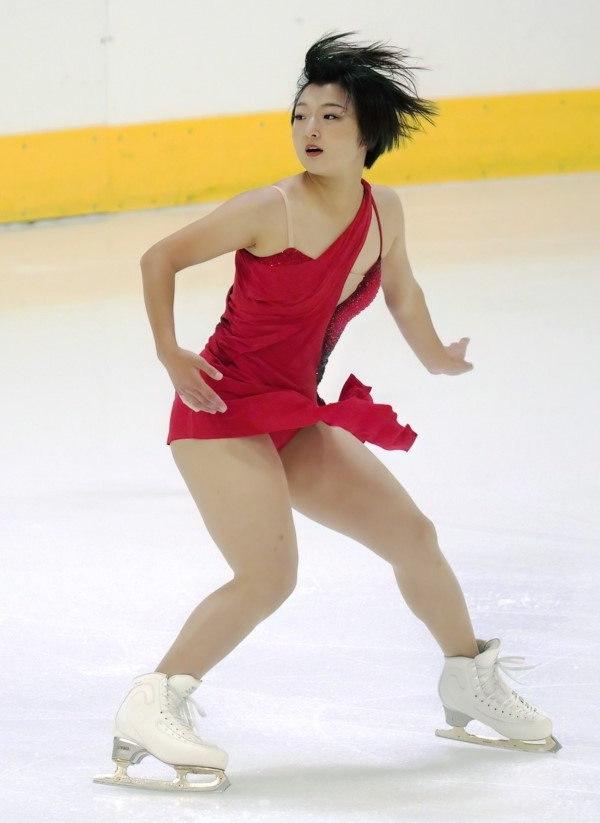
Sakamoto performing her free skate at the 2022 CS Lombardia Trophy

Sakamoto entered the Final as a contender for the title, winning the short program by 1.28 points over longtime friend and training partner Mai Mihara. She successfully landed a triple-triple combination in the short program for the first time in the season, commenting: "I understand that no matter how my short program goes, I have to do well at the free skate. So finishing my short program perfectly after a long time, although I'm relieved, tomorrow's here soon." The free skate saw most participants struggle, with Sakamoto making several critical jump errors, finishing sixth in the segment and dropping to fifth overall. She said afterward that she had struggled in her practice sessions and felt mentally strained, concluding: "In any case, I have no other choice but to accept this result."

At the 2022–23 Japan Championships, Sakamoto skated cleanly in the short program for a score of 77.79, taking the lead with 3.09 points over Mihara. Her free skate score, 155.26, was a new domestic personal best, earning her the national title for the second consecutive year, ahead of Mihara and bronze medalist Mao Shimada. Sakamoto, Mihara, and twelfth-place Rinka Watanabe were named to Japan's 2023 World Championship team. Considered the favourite at the 2023 Winter World University Games in Lake Placid, Sakamoto won the short program over Mihara, but fell on her final triple loop jump in the free skate, finishing with the silver medal overall behind Mihara, the defending event champion. Appearing next at the International Challenge Cup at the end of February, Sakamoto won both segments of the competition to take the gold medal, in the process posting her first international free skate score of over 150 points for the season. Mihara and Mana Kawabe joined her in a Japanese sweep of the podium.

At the 2023 World Championships in Saitama, Sakamoto won the short program with a score of 79.24, more than five points clear of South Korea's Lee Hae-in in second place. In the free skate, she singled a planned triple flip jump, the same jump she had erred on in Saitama four years earlier, but still completed the intended jump combination with a triple toe loop. She skated the rest of the program cleanly, finishing second in the segment behind Lee with a score of 145.37, and remained first overall with a score of 224.61 to win her second World gold medal. In doing so, Sakamoto became the fourth woman to win consecutive World Championships since abolition of compulsory figures in 1991, after Kristi Yamaguchi (1991-1992), Michelle Kwan (2000-2001), and Evgenia Medvedeva (2016-2017). Reflecting on her free skate in comparison to her podium miss in 2019, Sakamoto said that "this time, ideally I wanted to skate clean and end with a happy smile. However, I made the same mistake I did four years ago, so I am disappointed. I was able to recover, though, so I think I have grown from four years ago."

Sakamoto was named captain of Team Japan for the 2023 World Team Trophy. In the short program, she underrotated and fell on the second part of her jump combination, but nevertheless placed second in the segment, behind only Lee of Team South Korea. She was second in the free skate segment as well, again behind Lee, with her only error being another fall on a jump combination. Team Japan won the bronze medal.

==== 2023–2024 season: Undefeated season, third consecutive World title ====
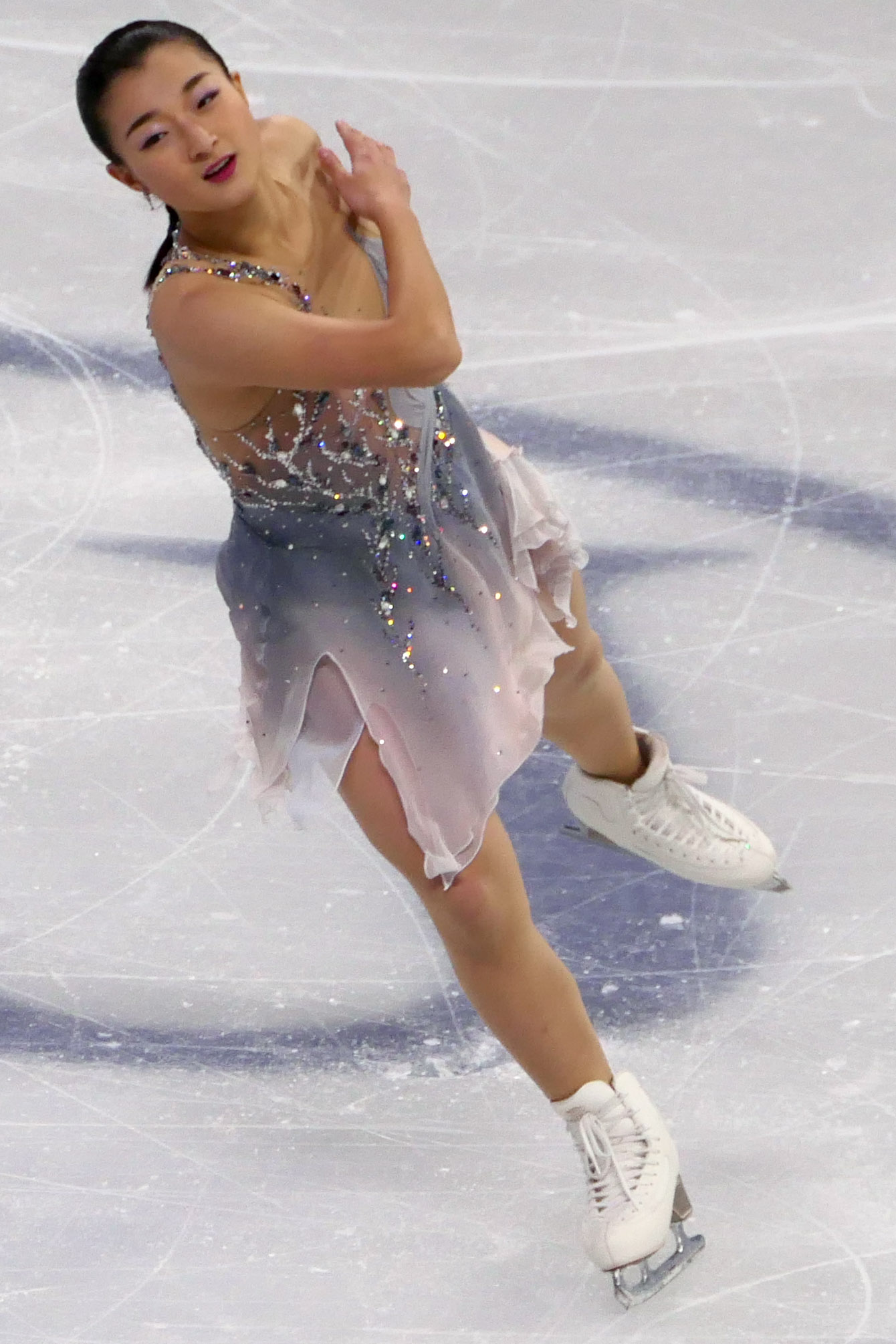
Sakamoto performing her short program at the 2024 World Championships

In preparation for the 2023–24 figure skating season, Sakamoto worked with choreographer Jeffrey Buttle on her short program, having selected the music "Baby, God Bless You" from the soundtrack of Japanese medical drama, Kōnodori. Having become an aunt to a niece and nephew in 2023, Sakamoto stated that she had wanted to dedicate a program specifically to them. As for her free skate, Sakamoto worked with Marie-France Dubreuil for the second year in a row. Regarding the program, Sakamoto said, "It's a jazz program with an image that I've never done before. I've done mature songs before, but it's a genre that I haven't done before, and it has a bit of a sexy part. I think it's a song that I can do because I'm at this age. I'm looking forward to seeing how it will be received." She also worked with retired American ice dancer, Zachary Donohue, over the summer to further improve her skating skills.

Appearing on the Challenger circuit to start the season, Sakamoto won gold at the 2023 CS Autumn Classic International. At the 2023 Japan Open, she finished first in the women's free skate with a score of 149.59, helping Team Japan to win the gold medal.

Sakamoto began the Grand Prix with her first-ever appearance at the Skate Canada International, winning both segments of the competition to take the gold medal by a 25-point margin over silver medalist Kim Chae-yeon of South Korea. With a 151-point free skate score, Sakamoto remarked "not often am I able to skate that well in an international competition." She went on to win the 2023 Grand Prix of Espoo as well, this time defeating fellow Japanese skater Rion Sumiyoshi by exactly 15 points. She commented that "I wanted to skate without major mistakes and to win and I was able to do that. Hopefully it will lead to another first place in the Grand Prix Final."

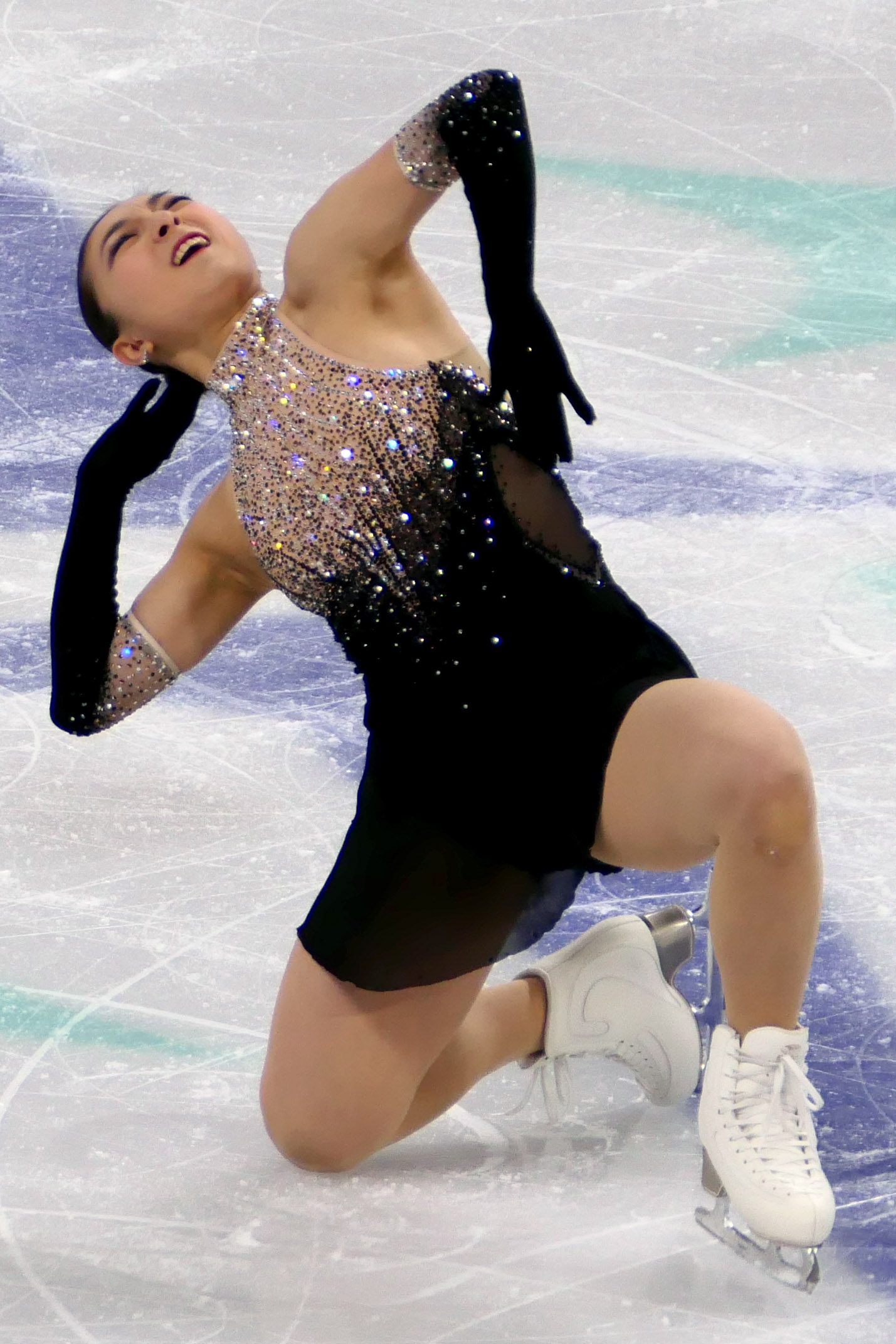
Sakamoto performing her free skate at the 2024 World Championships

At the Final in Beijing, Sakamoto won both segments, capturing her first Grand Prix Final title by over 20 points and thereby completing the "Career Grand Slam" of major event gold medals. “This year, I had a good start with the Grand Prix,” noted Sakamoto, “so I really wanted to keep it going like that." Reflecting on disappointments in prior years, she said she "went into the Final last year confused – and it showed in competition. I think it may have been my worst performance ever. But I knew I couldn't be any worse and I've been a lot more motivated than last season." At the end of the same month, Sakamoto entered the 2023–24 Japan Championships as the heavy favorite for a fourth straight national title. She won the short program by almost nine points over second-place Mako Yamashita. She went on to win the free skate segment by 13.09 points over Mone Chiba, and claimed the gold medal over Chiba by over 23 points.

At the 2024 World Championships in Montreal, Sakamoto placed fourth in the short program after a somewhat shaky performance that saw a rough landing on her triple Lutz and a stumble in her step sequence. She expressed disappointment with the outing, noting "so many mistakes one after another." Despite this, she was only 0.26 points behind Lee Hae-in, in third place, and 3.69 points behind leader Loena Hendrickx. Sakamoto rallied in the free skate, placing first in that segment by a wide margin to take the gold medal over silver medalist Isabeau Levito and bronze medalist Kim Chae-yeon. "I skated well from the beginning of the season, and I feel like I gained confidence going for next season,” she said. Her victory marked the first time in 56 years that a women's singles skater won three consecutive World titles. Reflecting on her performance, Sakamoto remarked, "I was able to calm down today. I was able to keep focused and do my elements one after the other and I am happy with this result."

During the 2024 Paris Olympics, a medal ceremony was held for Sakamoto and her teammates from the 2022 Olympic Figure Skating Team Event, where they were awarded their Olympic silver medals.

==== 2024–2025 season: World silver and Grand Prix Final bronze ====
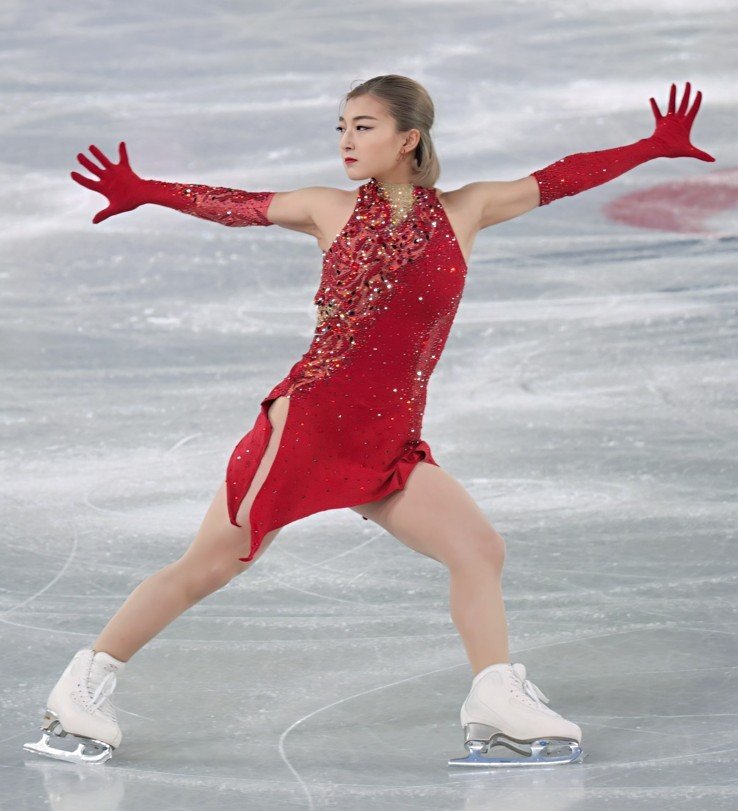
Sakamoto performing her short program at the 2024–25 Grand Prix Final

Sakamoto began the season by finishing third at the 2024 CS Lombardia Trophy behind American skaters, Amber Glenn and Sarah Everhardt. Going on to compete on the 2024–25 Grand Prix series, Sakamoto won the short program at 2024 Skate Canada International but fell twice during the free skate, finishing second in that segment of the competition behind teammate Rino Matsuike. However, her twenty-two point lead over Matsuike in the short program was enough for her to hold onto first place. Following the event, Sakamoto said, "I am happy about the win but I am very disappointed about the content. So, I will take this very big disappointment to heart and make it my motivation to do better."

Two weeks later, at the 2024 NHK Trophy, Sakamoto delivered two clean performances and won the event, almost twenty points ahead of silver medalist Mone Chiba. In a post-event interview, Sakamoto expressed, "I was nervous in a good way. I don't know why, but I had that confidence that I could enjoy myself. I wanted the audience and the judge to have a smile on their faces. I was able to jump well. And at the very end, on the choreography sequence, it was really physically tough. But my coaches encouraged me and I was able to get through." During the event's exhibition gala, all members of the 2022 Olympic Team Event, including Sakamoto, were invited to center stage, wearing their Olympic costumes and Olympic medals, in celebration of their achievement.

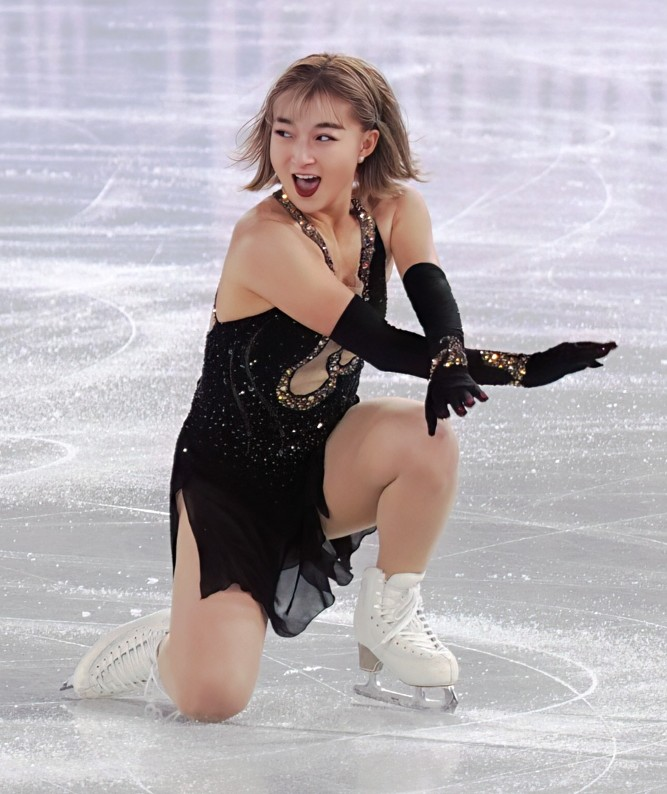
Sakamoto during her free skate at the 2024–25 Grand Prix Final

With her Grand Prix results, she qualified for the Grand Prix Final for a third consecutive year. Competing there, she finished in fourth place in the short program after falling on her jump combination, and she said that she had skated with too much caution. In the free skate, she received under-rotation calls on her jump combinations in the second half of the program but rose to third place overall to win the bronze medal. She noted that she had been struggling with her jumps in practice and said, "I'm glad I was able to get on the podium." After the free skate, she said: “Compared to the short program, I was able to approach it with more confidence. I was able to give it my all with the feeling that I wanted to show what I had been practicing. So, I am satisfied with today’s program."

Two weeks later, she competed at the 2024–25 Japan Championships, winning her fifth national title. She was subsequently named to the World team.

In February, Sakamoto competed at the 2025 Asian Winter Games, where she won the silver medal behind Kim Chae-yeon of South Korea. The following month, at the 2025 World Championships in Boston, Massachusetts, United States, Sakamoto placed fifth in the short program after popping the first part of her planned triple flip-triple toe combination into a double. She came back with a strong free skate, however, placing second in that segment and winning the silver medal overall behind Alysa Liu of the United States. In an interview following the event, Sakamoto shared, "I am so emotional right now. I was actually already emotional all day. I was crying on the bus here and when I was doing my makeup. Wakaba was texting me, ‘Let’s just do our best,’ and that also made me cry and feel so emotional. At the end, when Alysa hugged me, there were also so many mixed emotions inside me. On one hand, I was happy for Alysa, of course, but on the other hand, there was a little bit of frustration. After so many consecutive titles, now everything is back to zero, and I feel like a weight is falling off my shoulders. My coach also told me maybe this is for the better."

A few weeks later, Sakamoto competed for Team Japan at the 2025 World Team Trophy. She placed second in the women's short program behind Alysa Liu and third in the free skate behind Liu and Amber Glenn. These placements helped secure the silver medal for Team Japan.

==== 2025–2026 season: Milano Cortina Olympic silvers, fourth World title, Grand Prix Final bronze, and retirement ====
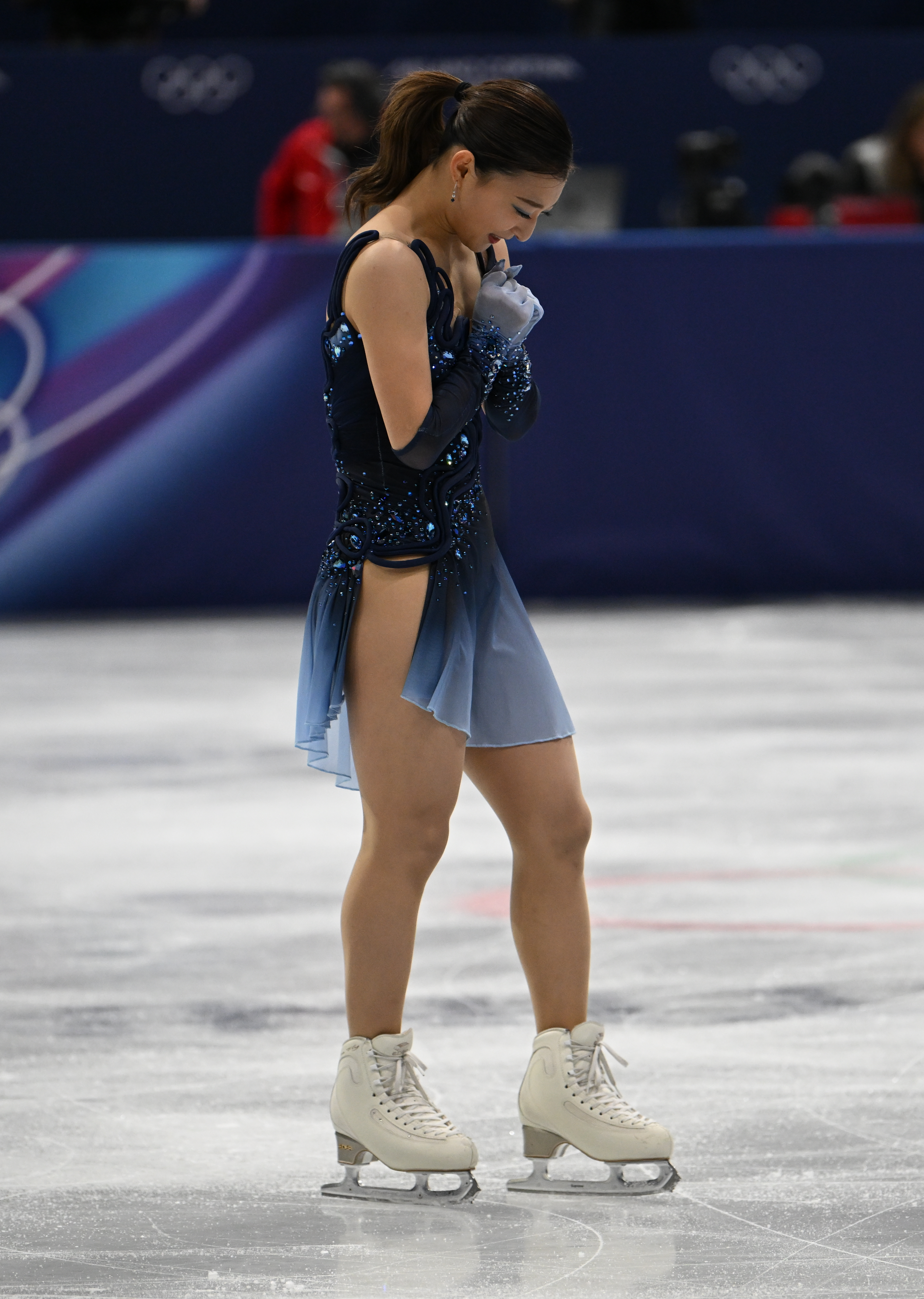
Sakamoto following her short program at the 2026 Winter Olympics

In June, Sakamoto announced her intention to retire from competitive figure skating following the season's conclusion. For her short program, Sakamoto decided to collaborate with Benoît Richaud and selected the song, "Time to Say Goodbye" as her music. Speaking on the intention behind the program, she shared, "The title of the song means goodbye, but rather than it being the end, it's more like I'm looking towards my next self, and since this is a short program to move on to the next thing, it definitely doesn't feel like the end." For her free skate, one of the songs used in the program, "Hymne à l'amour", was music Sakamoto had been saving to use in her last season after having seen fellow Japanese skater Akiko Suzuki, whom she admired, perform to it during her own final season at the 2014 Winter Olympics.

She opened the season at the 2025 CS Kinoshita Group Cup in September, where she won the silver medal behind Mone Chiba.

The following month, she placed a close second behind Ami Nakai at the 2025 Grand Prix de France. She shared that "coming in second was significant" for her. "This is my 20th Grand Prix event, and that experience definitely helps me in a positive way," she said. "I know how to handle these events and what to do. But on the other side, sometimes it also leads me to overthinking."

Three weeks later, Sakamoto dominated the women's discipline at the 2025 NHK Trophy, taking her fourth gold medal at this event, and qualifying for the 2025–26 Grand Prix Final. "To be honest, I’m really very relieved," she said after the free skate. "I’m in a pretty good condition, but still, if I make a mistake, I find that I tend to lose my concentration."

In December, Sakamoto competed at 2025–26 Grand Prix Final in Nagoya, Japan. She placed fifth in the short program after popping her planned triple Lutz into a double, making the element invalid. She came back with a solid free skate, however, winning that segment to rise to the bronze medal position overall. "I basically left something on the table in both the short and free programs," Sakamoto acknowledged. "But despite that, I was able to place third, so I’m satisfied with this result. The Japanese Nationals is only two weeks from now, so I think it was a good experience for me to have been able to do this competition."

At the 2025–26 Japan Championships, Sakamoto won her sixth national title and was subsequently named to the Winter Olympic team for a third consecutive time. The women's short program of the team event was held on 6 February 2026. Sakamoto finished in first place, setting a new personal best score for the season. Sakamoto's performance was described as "dazzling", earning top levels on her spins and step sequence. "I thought I skated really well for my first performance at this Olympics," Sakamoto said in an interview. "I was my usual self. I was nervous like I always am, but it wasn’t to a point where my legs were shaking."

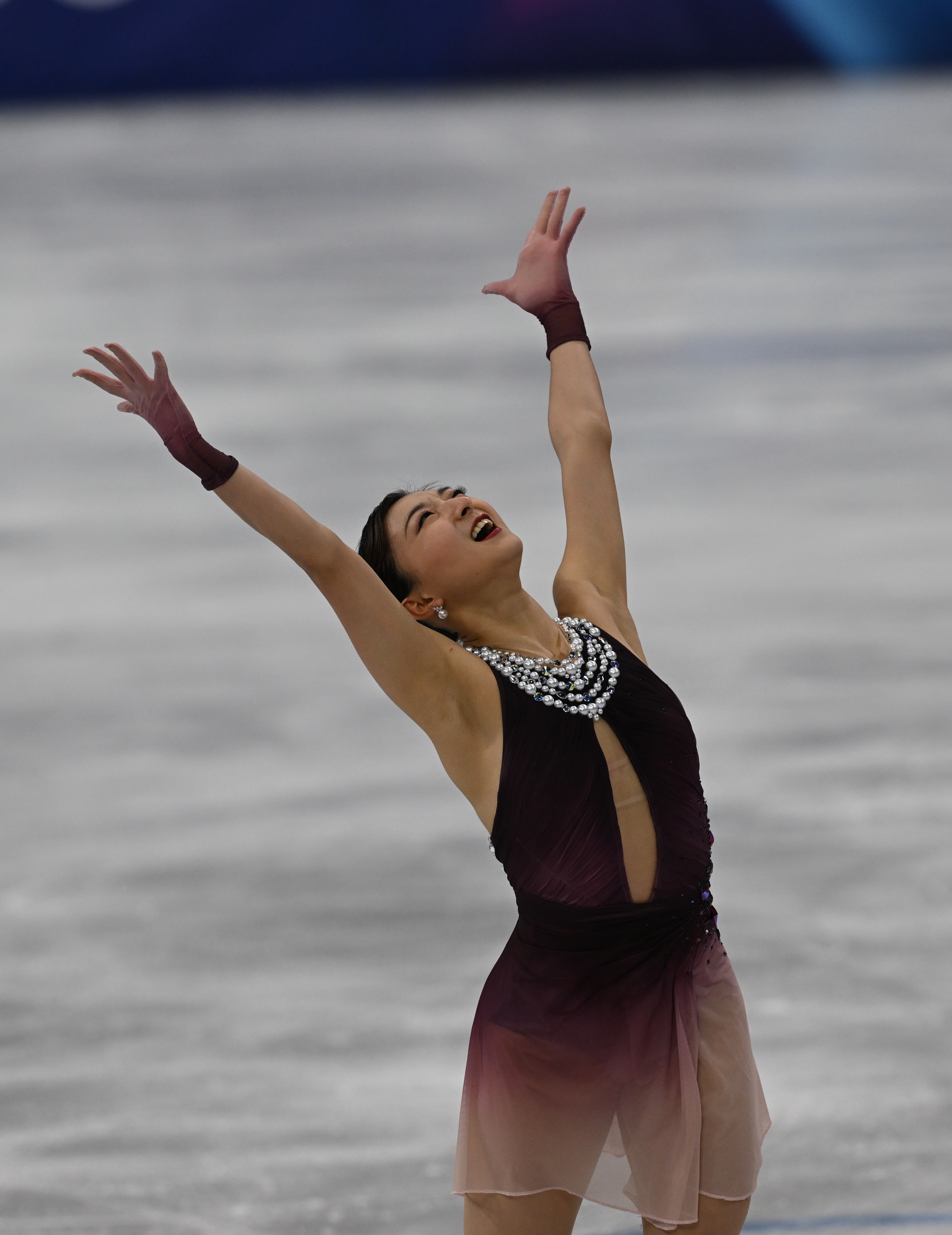
Sakamoto at the end of her free skate at the 2026 Winter Olympics

"The idea of getting the perfect 10 points had been something that made me put pressure on myself internally," she said. "But today, I skated with the mindset of simply doing what I needed to do properly, so instead of it becoming overwhelming pressure, it turned into a good, healthy level of tension." Two days later, Sakamoto also won the free skate segment, helping Team Japan secure the Olympic silver medal for a second consecutive time. "We’ve been talking about this since Paris two years ago, really since Beijing four years ago," she shared after her free skate. Riku, Ryuichi, Yuma, and I talked about doing our best to win another medal at the Milan Olympics four years later. Since winning a medal in Beijing, the team event has become just as important as the individual competition. Of course, there are concerns about physical strain, but it makes me really happy to be trusted as the team that can help Japan win, and we want to answer that trust."

On 17 February, Sakamoto competed in the short program of the Women's singles event. She placed second in the short program behind Ami Nakai after the second part of her triple flip-triple toe combination was called as being underrotated. "Today, I was nervous like usual," she said following her performance. "But I had so much fun while skating. I was probably smiling a lot, wondering why it was so much fun. I'm very satisfied... It's easier to be the one chasing, so I'm grateful to Ami for letting me stay in the chasing position until the very end. I think the generational change is already secure. Japan is in a good place."

Two days later, she competed in the free skate segment. Although she skated a solid program, Sakamoto made a costly mistake of landing too far forward on her second triple flip jump and was unable to execute the planned triple flip-triple toe combination. As a result, she incurred Zayak rule penalties for repeating a jump and omitted a third jump combination from her program. This error caused her to finish second in the free skate and second overall behind Alysa Liu by 1.89 points. After the scores were finalized, American figure skater Amber Glenn sat next to and comforted Sakamoto. A video that later went viral online shows Glenn standing up to wave away a cameraman who tried to get a close-up of Sakamoto's tear-filled face.

"I've always been able to deliver at moments like Nationals or the World Championship, when it really counts," said Sakamoto in an interview following the event. "So honestly, I keep wondering why I couldn't do it here. That feeling is really strong. I'm quite frustrated... Four years ago in Beijing, I won what felt like a miraculous bronze medal. Now, four years later, I came here aiming for gold. I'm frustrated that I couldn't win it and ended up with silver. But the fact that I can feel frustrated even though I moved up a medal color shows how much I’ve grown over these past four years. All the experiences I’ve accumulated have led to this growth, and I think that's something I can be proud of."

Sakamoto and speed skater, Wataru Morishige, were subsequently selected as Japan's flag bearers for the Olympic closing ceremony.

In March, Sakamoto earned her fourth World title at the 2026 World Figure Skating Championships in Prague, Czech Republic. She placed first in the short program, breaking the record for highest program component scores (PCS) awarded in a woman's short program, earning a small gold medal for her result. Two days later, Sakamoto skated her final competitive skating program, the free skate, for which she broke the record for highest PCS awarded in a woman's free skate and set a new personal best score with 158.97 points overall. "I actually took ten days completely away from skating," said Sakamoto. "During that time, I was able to reset both my mind and my body. After that, I had to restart training and get back into competition shape. Even that process was a lot of fun. In the last week of training, I was able to skate both my short program and free program clean, and that's how I got this medal. This whole month after the Olympics was really a lot of fun for me." Following the event, Sakamoto confirmed her retirement from competitive figure skating.

== Reputation and legacy ==
Sakamoto is recognized as one of the most beloved skaters on the competitive circuit. Media coverage has frequently noted her emotional transparency regarding her competitive results. After finishing 1.89 points behind Alysa Liu to win the silver medal at the 2026 Winter Olympics, Sakamoto openly expressed her frustration, stating that the intensity of her disappointment reflected the extent of the work she had committed over the preceding four years.

Ahead of her final competitive appearance at the 2026 World Championships in Prague, Sakamoto stated that her primary focus was not the final placement, but rather performing without regret to express gratitude to her supporters. Her influence on her teammates was evident during her retirement performance. Japanese teammate Mone Chiba, who won silver at the same event, stated she wept at rink-side upon realizing it would be the last time she watched Sakamoto compete.

== Post-competitive career ==
In June 2026, it was announced that Sakamoto had begun working as a coach at the Sysmex Kobe Ice Campus where she had previously trained throughout her competitive career.

== Honours and awards ==
- Hyogo Prefecture Sports Award: Homare Award (2026)
- Hyogo Prefecture Sports Award: Special Athlete Award (2022, 2023, 2024)
- Japanese Olympic Committee, JOC Sports Award: Special Honour Award (2022, 2024)
- Japan Skating Federation: JOC Cup Best Athlete Award (2022, 2024)
- Kansai Sports Award (2023, 2024)
- Kozuki Sports Award (2017, 2022, 2023)
- Kobe City: Kobe Honor Award (2022)
- Kobe City: Special Sports Award (2022, 2023)
- Kobe Shimbun Sports Award (2022)
- TV Asahi: Big Sports Special Award (2022)

== Programs ==
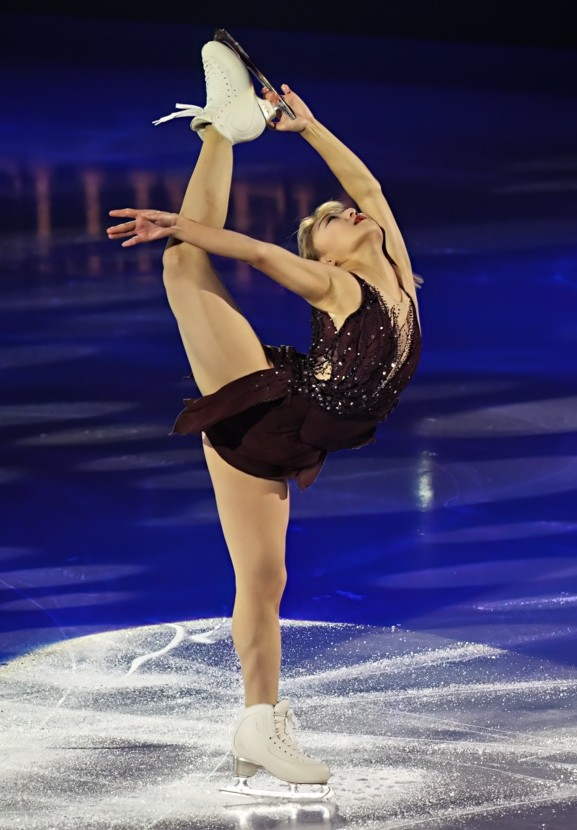
Sakamoto performing a one-handed Biellmann spin during the gala at the 2024–25 Grand Prix Final

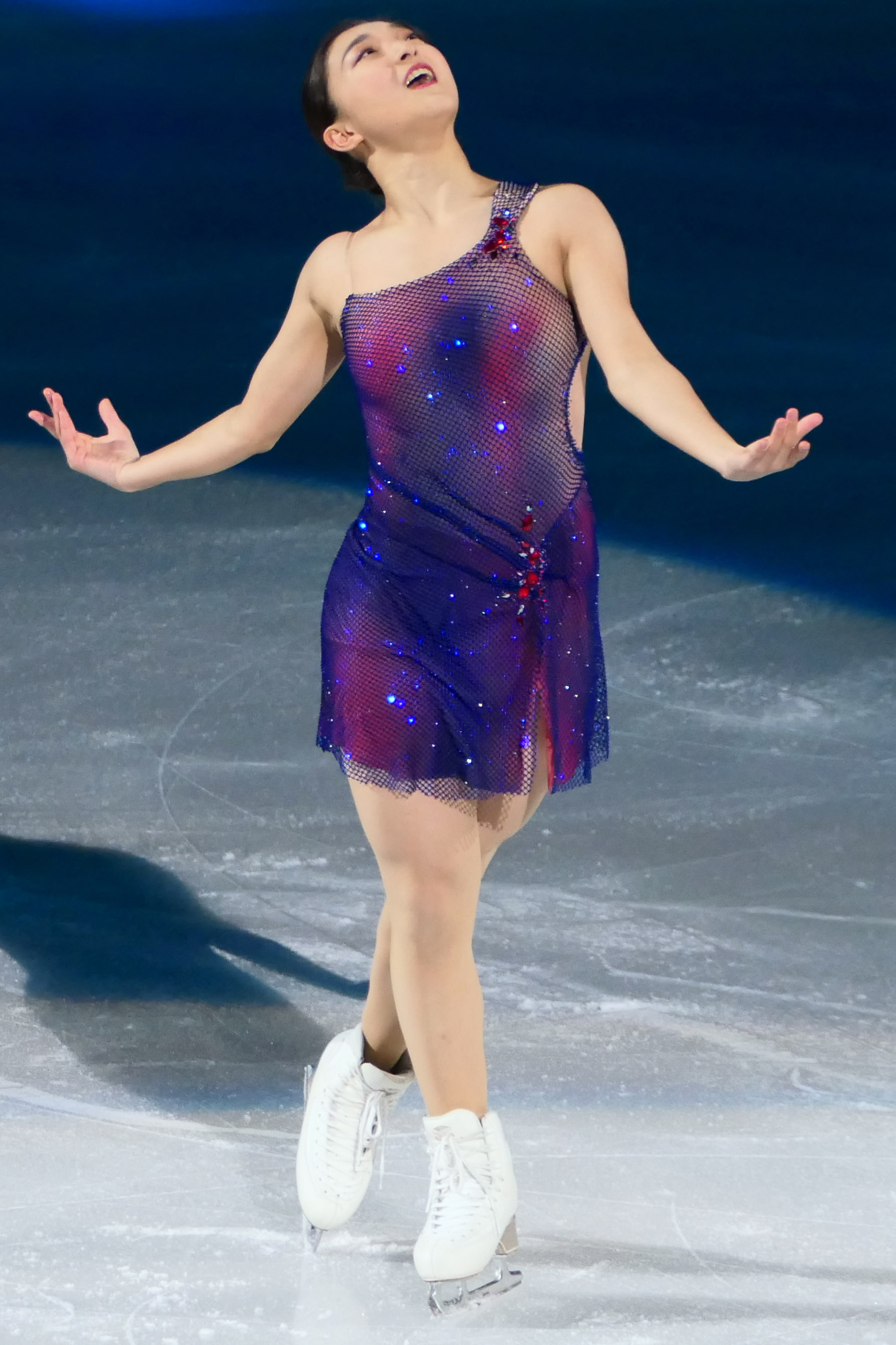
Sakamoto during the gala at the 2024 World Championships

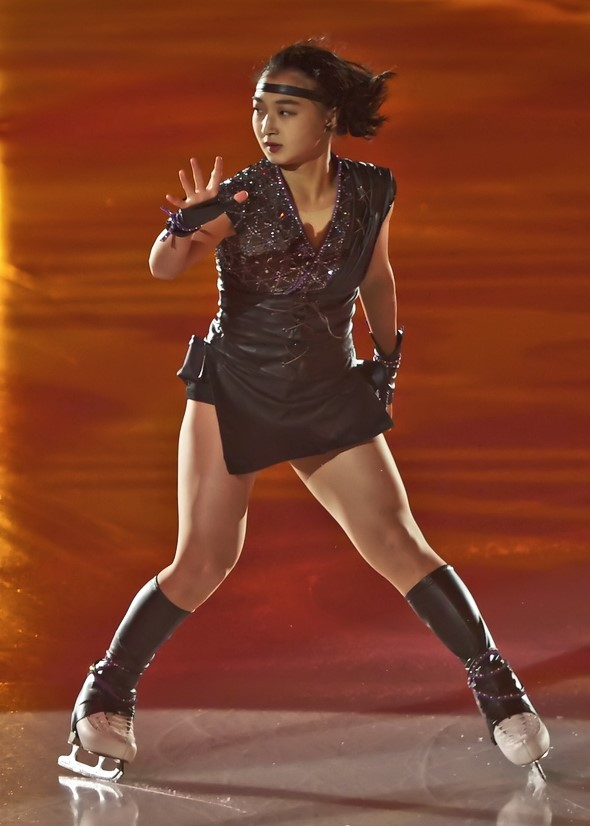
Sakamoto performing her exhibition program at the 2019 Internationaux de France

=== Post-Competitive Career Programs ===
| Season | Exhibition |
|---|---|
| 2026–2027 | Feeling Good (from Birds of Prey) by SOFI TUKKER, choreo. by Wakaba Higuchi |

=== Competition and exhibition programs ===
- Program details mentioned at first occurrence
- Olympic seasons highlighted in blue
- Programs performed at the Winter Olympics highlighted in **bold**

Competition and exhibition programs by season
| Season | Short program | Free skate program | Exhibition program |
|---|---|---|---|
| 2013–14 | Anything Goes: Composed by Cole Porter; Choreo. by Masashiro Kawagoe | Aladdin: Composed by Alan Menken; Choreo. by Masashiro Kawagoe | —N/a |
| 2014–15 | "Dark Eyes": Composed by Florian Hermann; Choreo. by Masashiro Kawagoe, Sonoko Nakano, Yukina Ota | Romeo and Juliet: Composed by Pyotr Ilyich Tchaikovsky; Choreo. by Masashiro Kawagoe, Sonoko Nakano, Yukina Ota | —N/a |
| 2015–16 | "Malagueña": Composed by Ernesto Lecuona; Choreo. by Masashiro Kawagoe | The Color Purple: Composed by Quincy Jones; Choreo. by Masashiro Kawagoe | —N/a |
| 2016–17 | The Artist: Composed by Ludovic Bource; Choreo. by Massimo Scali | The Color Purple | Primavera Porteña: Composed by Astor Piazzolla; Performed by Kazuma Miura; Choreo. by Masashiro Kawagoe |
| 2017–18 | **Moonlight Sonata**: Composed by Ludwig van Beethoven; Choreo. by Benoît Richaud | **Amélie**: Composed by Yann Tiersen; Choreo. by Benoît Richaud; **Tracks used**: 1. "La Valse d'Amélie" (orchestral version); 2. "Sur le fil" 3. "La Noyée" | James Bond Medley: 1. "Diamonds Are Forever"; Performed by Shirley Bassey; 2. "The Name's Bond ... James Bond"; Performed by Nicholas Dodd |
| 2017–18 | **Moonlight Sonata**: Composed by Ludwig van Beethoven; Choreo. by Benoît Richaud | **Amélie**: Composed by Yann Tiersen; Choreo. by Benoît Richaud; **Tracks used**: 1. "La Valse d'Amélie" (orchestral version); 2. "Sur le fil" 3. "La Noyée" | The Color Purple |
| 2017–18 | **Moonlight Sonata**: Composed by Ludwig van Beethoven; Choreo. by Benoît Richaud | **Amélie**: Composed by Yann Tiersen; Choreo. by Benoît Richaud; **Tracks used**: 1. "La Valse d'Amélie" (orchestral version); 2. "Sur le fil" 3. "La Noyée" | Amélie |
| 2017–18 | **Moonlight Sonata**: Composed by Ludwig van Beethoven; Choreo. by Benoît Richaud | **Amélie**: Composed by Yann Tiersen; Choreo. by Benoît Richaud; **Tracks used**: 1. "La Valse d'Amélie" (orchestral version); 2. "Sur le fil" 3. "La Noyée" | Primavera Porteña |
| 2018–19 | "From My First Moment (Gymnopédie No. 1)": Composed by Erik Satie; Performed by Charlotte Church; Choreo. by David Wilson | The Piano: Composed by Michael Nyman; Choreo. by Benoît Richaud; **Tracks used**: 1. "The Embrace"; 2. "The Scent of Love"; 3. "Deep into the Forest"; 4. "Wild Side" (from Tree of Life Suite by Roberto Cacciapaglia) | "Jin": Composed by Tsukuyomi; Choreo. by Misao Sato |
| 2018–19 | "From My First Moment (Gymnopédie No. 1)": Composed by Erik Satie; Performed by Charlotte Church; Choreo. by David Wilson | The Piano: Composed by Michael Nyman; Choreo. by Benoît Richaud; **Tracks used**: 1. "The Embrace"; 2. "The Scent of Love"; 3. "Deep into the Forest"; 4. "Wild Side" (from Tree of Life Suite by Roberto Cacciapaglia) | Cabaret: Composed by John Kander, Fred Ebb; Performed by The West End Orchestra & Singers |
| 2019–20 | "No Roots": Composed by Alice Merton; Choreo. by Shae-Lynn Bourne | The Matrix: Composed by Don Davis; Choreo. by Benoît Richaud | "Jin" |
| 2020–21 | Medley: 1. Prelude No. 2; Composed by Johann Sebastian Bach; Performed by Jacques Loussier Trio; 2. Bach à la Jazz; Composed by Matt Herskowitz, Mary Kerr; Choreo. by Benoît Richaud | The Matrix | Les Demoiselles de Rochefort: Composed by Michel Legrand |
| 2020–21 | Medley: 1. Prelude No. 2; Composed by Johann Sebastian Bach; Performed by Jacques Loussier Trio; 2. Bach à la Jazz; Composed by Matt Herskowitz, Mary Kerr; Choreo. by Benoît Richaud | The Matrix | "Jin" |
| 2021–22 | **Gladiator**: Composed by Lisa Gerrard, Hans Zimmer; Choreo. by Benoît Richaud | **I Am a Woman**: 1. "No More Fight Left In Me"; Composed by Imany, Armand Amar; 2. "Tris"; Performed by Ellie Goulding, Junkie XL; Choreo. by Benoît Richaud | "**Tango Amore**": Composed by Edvin Marton; Choreo. by Misao Sato |
| 2021–22 | **Gladiator**: Composed by Lisa Gerrard, Hans Zimmer; Choreo. by Benoît Richaud | **I Am a Woman**: 1. "No More Fight Left In Me"; Composed by Imany, Armand Amar; 2. "Tris"; Performed by Ellie Goulding, Junkie XL; Choreo. by Benoît Richaud | "Lose You to Love Me": Performed by Selena Gomez; Choreo. by Benoît Richaud |
| 2022–23 | Janet Jackson Medley: 1. "Rock with U"; Performed by Janet Jackson, Ne-Yo; 2. "Feedback"; Performed by Janet Jackson; Choreo. by Rohene Ward | "Elastic Heart" (Original song and Clams Casino remix): Performed by Sia; Choreo. by Marie-France Dubreuil | "Heart Upon My Sleeve": Performed by Avicii, Imagine Dragons; Choreo. by Yuka Sato |
| 2022–23 | Janet Jackson Medley: 1. "Rock with U"; Performed by Janet Jackson, Ne-Yo; 2. "Feedback"; Performed by Janet Jackson; Choreo. by Rohene Ward | "Elastic Heart" (Original song and Clams Casino remix): Performed by Sia; Choreo. by Marie-France Dubreuil | "Tango Amore" |
| 2022–23 | Janet Jackson Medley: 1. "Rock with U"; Performed by Janet Jackson, Ne-Yo; 2. "Feedback"; Performed by Janet Jackson; Choreo. by Rohene Ward | "Elastic Heart" (Original song and Clams Casino remix): Performed by Sia; Choreo. by Marie-France Dubreuil | "Love Shack": Performed by The B-52s |
| 2023–24 | "Baby, God Bless You": Composed by Shinya Kiyozuka; Performed by Orchestra Possible; Choreo. by Jeffrey Buttle | Lauryn Hill Medley: 1. "Wild Is the Wind"; 2. "Feeling Good"; Performed by Lauryn Hill; Choreo. by Marie-France Dubreuil | "Elastic Heart" (Violin cover): Performed by Lena Yokoyama; Choreo. by Marie-France Dubreuil |
| 2023–24 | "Baby, God Bless You": Composed by Shinya Kiyozuka; Performed by Orchestra Possible; Choreo. by Jeffrey Buttle | Lauryn Hill Medley: 1. "Wild Is the Wind"; 2. "Feeling Good"; Performed by Lauryn Hill; Choreo. by Marie-France Dubreuil | "Trampoline": Performed by Shaed |
| 2024–25 | Astor Piazzolla Medley: 1. "Resurreccion del Angel"; 2. "La muerte del Angel"; Composed by Astor Piazzolla; Performed by Gidon Kremer; Choreo. by Rohene Ward | "All That Jazz": From Chicago; Composed by John Kander; Performed by Renée Zellweger, Catherine Zeta-Jones; Choreo. by Marie-France Dubreuil | "Poison": Performed by Freya Ridings; Choreo. by Kana Muramoto |
| 2024–25 | Astor Piazzolla Medley: 1. "Resurreccion del Angel"; 2. "La muerte del Angel"; Composed by Astor Piazzolla; Performed by Gidon Kremer; Choreo. by Rohene Ward | "All That Jazz": From Chicago; Composed by John Kander; Performed by Renée Zellweger, Catherine Zeta-Jones; Choreo. by Marie-France Dubreuil | "Shine": Performed by Leo Ieiri; Choreo. by Akiko Suzuki |
| 2025–26 | **"Time to Say Goodbye"**: Performed by Andrea Bocelli, Sarah Brightman; Choreo. by Benoît Richaud | **Édith Piaf Medley**: 1. "La Vie en rose" 2. "Hymne à l'amour" 3. "Non, je ne regrette rien"; Performed by Patricia Kaas; Choreo. by Marie-France Dubreuil | "Non, je ne regrette rien": Performed by Patricia Kaas; Choreo. by Satoko Miyahara |
| 2025–26 | **"Time to Say Goodbye"**: Performed by Andrea Bocelli, Sarah Brightman; Choreo. by Benoît Richaud | **Édith Piaf Medley**: 1. "La Vie en rose" 2. "Hymne à l'amour" 3. "Non, je ne regrette rien"; Performed by Patricia Kaas; Choreo. by Marie-France Dubreuil | "Poison" |
| 2025–26 | **"Time to Say Goodbye"**: Performed by Andrea Bocelli, Sarah Brightman; Choreo. by Benoît Richaud | **Édith Piaf Medley**: 1. "La Vie en rose" 2. "Hymne à l'amour" 3. "Non, je ne regrette rien"; Performed by Patricia Kaas; Choreo. by Marie-France Dubreuil | **"A Million Dreams"**: From The Greatest Showman; Composed by Pasek and Paul; Performed by Pink; Choreo. by Misato Komatsubara |

== Competitive highlights ==
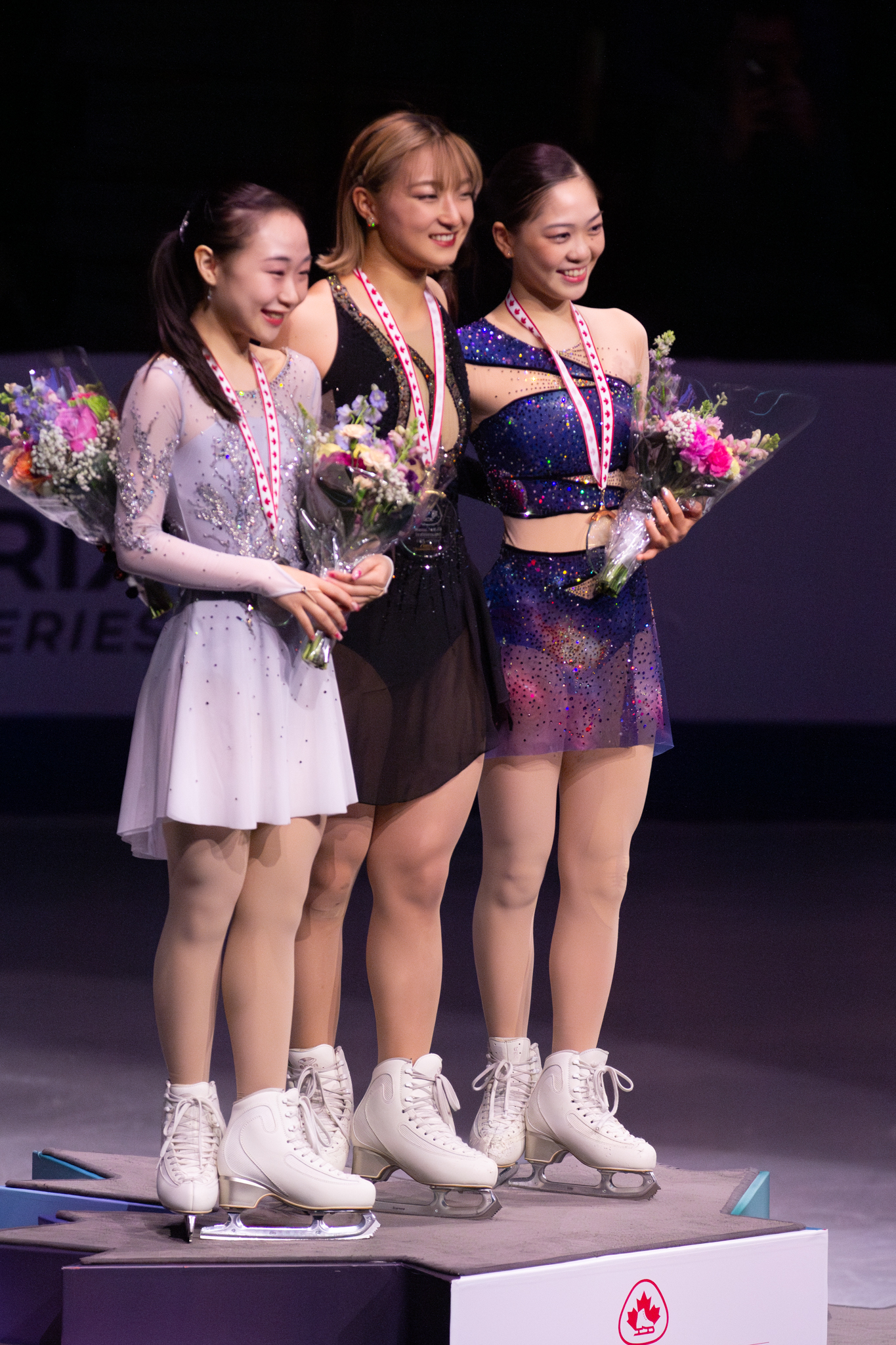
Sakamoto (center) at the 2024 Skate Canada International medal ceremony with Rino Matsuike (left) and Hana Yoshida (right)

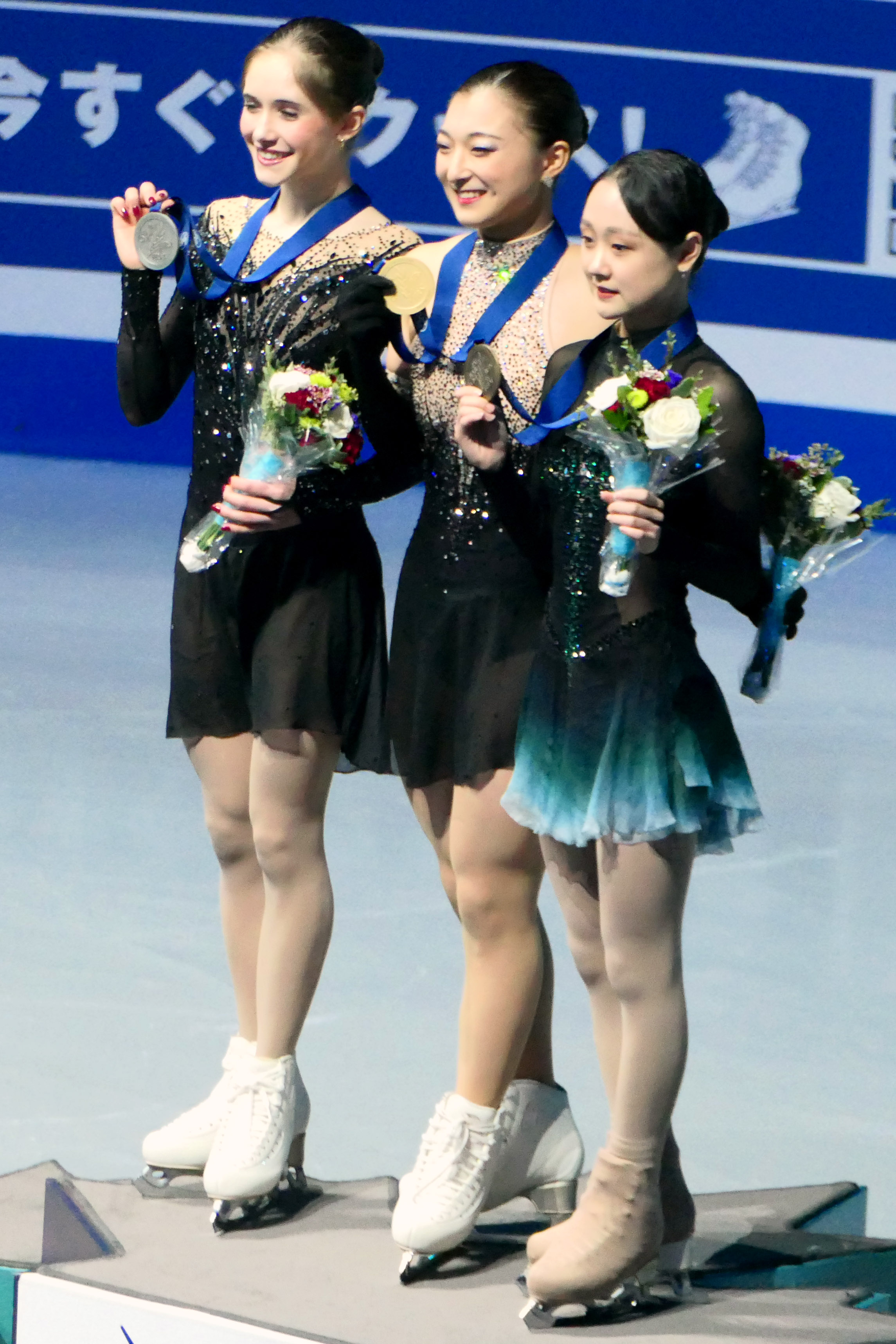
Sakamoto (center) at the 2024 World Championship medal ceremony with Isabeau Levito (left) and Kim Chae-yeon (right)

- GP – Event of the ISU Grand Prix Series
- JGP – Event of the ISU Junior Grand Prix Series
- CS – Event of the ISU Challenger Series
- TBD – Assigned
- WD – Withdrew from competition
- Medals at team events are awarded for the team results only. Individual placements at team events are listed in parentheses.

Competition placements at senior level
| Season | 2013–14 | 2014–15 | 2015–16 | 2016–17 | 2017–18 | 2018–19 | 2019–20 | 2020–21 | 2021–22 | 2022–23 | 2023–24 | 2024–25 | 2025–26 |
|---|---|---|---|---|---|---|---|---|---|---|---|---|---|
| Winter Olympics | | | | | 6th | | | | 3rd | | | | 2nd |
| Winter Olympics (Team event) | | | | | 5th | | | | 2nd | | | | 2nd |
| World Championships | | | | | | 5th | | 6th | 1st | 1st | 1st | 2nd | 1st |
| Four Continents Championships | | | | | 1st | 4th | 5th | | | | | | |
| Grand Prix Final | | | | | | 4th | | | | 5th | 1st | 3rd | 3rd |
| Japan Championships | 15th | 6th | 13th | 7th | 2nd | 1st | 6th | 2nd | 1st | 1st | 1st | 1st | 1st |
| World Team Trophy | | | | | | 2nd (3rd) | | 3rd (2nd) | | 3rd (2nd) | | 2nd (2nd) | |
| GP Finland | | | | | | 3rd | | | | | 1st | | |
| GP France | | | | | | | 4th | | | | | | 2nd |
| GP NHK Trophy | | | | | | | | 1st | 1st | 2nd | | 1st | 1st |
| GP Rostelecom Cup | | | | | 5th | | | | | | | | |
| GP Skate America | | | | | 2nd | 2nd | 4th | | 4th | 1st | | | |
| GP Skate Canada | | | | | | | | | | | 1st | 1st | |
| CS Autumn Classic | | | | | | | | | | | 1st | | |
| CS Kinoshita Group Cup | | | | | | | | | | | | | 2nd |
| CS Lombardia Trophy | | | | | | 4th | | | | 2nd | | 3rd | |
| CS Nepela Memorial | | | | | | | 2nd | | | | | | |
| CS U.S. Classic | | | | | 4th | | | | | | | | |
| Asian Games | | | | | | | | | | | | 2nd | |
| Asian Open Trophy | | | 3rd | | 1st | | | | 2nd | | | | |
| Challenge Cup | | | | | | | | | | 1st | 1st | | |
| Coupe du Printemps | | | | | 2nd | | | | | | | | |
| Japan Open | | | | | | 1st (2nd) | | | 2nd (4th) | 1st (1st) | 1st (1st) | | |
| World University Games | | | | | | | | | | 2nd | | | |

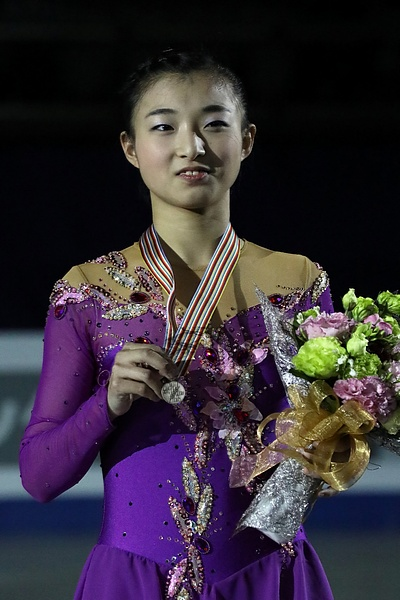
Sakamoto during the medal ceremony at the 2017 World Junior Championships

Competition placements at junior level
| Season | 2012–13 | 2013–14 | 2014–15 | 2015–16 | 2016–17 |
|---|---|---|---|---|---|
| Winter Youth Olympics | | | | 6th | |
| World Junior Championships | | | 6th | | 3rd |
| Junior Grand Prix Final | | | | | 3rd |
| Japan Championships | 9th | 6th | 2nd | 5th | 1st |
| JGP Czech Republic | | 6th | | | |
| JGP France | | | | | 2nd |
| JGP Japan | | | 7th | | 1st |
| JGP Latvia | | | | 2nd | |
| JGP Poland | | | | 4th | |
| Asian Open Trophy | | 1st | | | |
| Challenge Cup | | 1st | | | |

== Detailed results ==
ISU personal best scores in the +5/-5 GOE System
| Segment | Type | Score | Event |
|---|---|---|---|
| Total | **TSS** | **238.28** | 2026 World Championships |
| Short program | **TSS** | **80.32** | 2022 World Championships |
| Short program | TES | 43.25 | 2022 World Championships |
| Short program | PCS | 37.89 | 2026 World Championships |
| Free skating | **TSS** | **158.97** | 2026 World Championships |
| Free skating | TES | 80.87 | 2026 World Championships |
| Free skating | PCS | 78.10 | 2026 World Championships |

ISU personal best scores in the +3/-3 GOE System
| Segment | Type | Score | Event |
|---|---|---|---|
| Total | **TSS** | **214.21** | 2018 Four Continents Championships |
| Short program | **TSS** | **73.18** | 2018 Winter Olympics |
| Short program | TES | 40.36 | 2018 Winter Olympics |
| Short program | PCS | 32.82 | 2018 Winter Olympics |
| Free skating | **TSS** | **142.87** | 2018 Four Continents Championships |
| Free skating | TES | 74.78 | 2018 Four Continents Championships |
| Free skating | PCS | 68.11 | 2018 Winter Olympics |

=== Senior level ===
- Small medals for the short program and free skating are only awarded at ISU Championships.
- Medals at team events are awarded for the team results only. Individual placements at team events are listed in parentheses.
- ISU Personal Bests highlighted in **bold**

Results in the 2017–18 season
| Date | Event | SP | | FS | | Total | |
| Date | Event | P | Score | P | Score | P | Score |
|---|---|---|---|---|---|---|---|
| Aug 2–5, 2017 | (Hong Kong) 2017 Asian Open Trophy | 1 | 63.70 | 1 | 112.41 | 1 | 176.11 |
| Sep 13–17, 2017 | (United States) 2017 CS U.S. International Classic | 5 | 56.82 | 4 | 112.30 | 4 | 169.12 |
| Oct 20–22, 2017 | (Russia) 2017 Rostelecom Cup | 4 | 68.88 | 5 | 125.12 | 5 | 194.00 |
| Nov 24–26, 2017 | (United States) 2017 Skate America | 2 | 69.40 | 2 | 141.19 | 2 | 210.59 |
| Dec 21–24, 2017 | 2017–18 Japan Championships | 1 | 73.59 | 4 | 139.92 | 2 | 213.51 |
| Jan 22–28, 2018 | (Taiwan) 2018 Four Continents Championships | 2 | 71.34 | 1 | 142.87 | 1 | 214.21 |
| Feb 9–12, 2018 | (South Korea) 2018 Winter Olympics (Team event) | —N/a | —N/a | 5 | 131.91 | 5 | —N/a |
| Feb 9–12, 2018 | (South Korea) 2018 Winter Olympics | 5 | 73.18 | 6 | 136.53 | 6 | 209.71 |
| Mar 16–18, 2018 | (Luxembourg) 2018 Coupe du Printemps | 1 | 73.27 | 2 | 129.29 | 2 | 202.56 |

Results in the 2018–19 season
| Date | Event | SP | | FS | | Total | |
| Date | Event | P | Score | P | Score | P | Score |
|---|---|---|---|---|---|---|---|
| Sep 12–16, 2018 | (Italy) 2018 CS Lombardia Trophy | 9 | 49.91 | 2 | 130.94 | 4 | 180.85 |
| Oct 6, 2018 | 2018 Japan Open | —N/a | —N/a | 2 | 130.28 | 1 | —N/a |
| Oct 19–21, 2018 | (United States) 2018 Skate America | 2 | 71.29 | 2 | 142.61 | 2 | 213.90 |
| Nov 2–4, 2018 | (Finland) 2018 Grand Prix of Helsinki | 7 | 57.26 | 2 | 140.16 | 3 | 197.42 |
| Dec 6–9, 2018 | (Canada) 2018–19 Grand Prix Final | 4 | 70.23 | 4 | 141.45 | 4 | 211.68 |
| Dec 20–24, 2018 | 2018–19 Japan Championships | 2 | 75.65 | 2 | 152.36 | 1 | 228.01 |
| Feb 7–10, 2019 | (United States) 2019 Four Continents Championships | 2 | 73.36 | 4 | 133.43 | 4 | 206.79 |
| Mar 18–24, 2019 | (Japan) 2019 World Championships | 2 | 76.86 | 5 | 145.97 | 5 | 222.83 |
| Apr 11–14, 2019 | (Japan) 2019 World Team Trophy | 3 | 76.95 | 3 | 146.70 | 2 (3) | 223.65 |

Results in the 2019–20 season
| Date | Event | SP | | FS | | Total | |
| Date | Event | P | Score | P | Score | P | Score |
|---|---|---|---|---|---|---|---|
| Sep 19–21, 2019 | (Slovakia) 2019 CS Nepela Memorial | 4 | 59.97 | 2 | 134.45 | 2 | 194.42 |
| Oct 18–20, 2019 | (United States) 2019 Skate America | 2 | 73.25 | 4 | 129.22 | 4 | 202.47 |
| Nov 1–3, 2019 | 2019 Internationaux de France | 6 | 64.08 | 4 | 135.16 | 4 | 199.24 |
| Dec 18–22, 2019 | 2019–20 Japan Championships | 3 | 69.95 | 7 | 118.31 | 6 | 188.26 |
| Feb 4–9, 2020 | (South Korea) 2020 Four Continents Championships | 4 | 73.07 | 8 | 129.72 | 5 | 202.79 |

Results in the 2020–21 season
| Date | Event | SP | | FS | | Total | |
| Date | Event | P | Score | P | Score | P | Score |
|---|---|---|---|---|---|---|---|
| Nov 27–29, 2020 | (Japan) 2020 NHK Trophy | 1 | 75.60 | 1 | 153.91 | 1 | 229.51 |
| Dec 24–27, 2020 | 2020–21 Japan Championships | 2 | 71.86 | 2 | 150.31 | 2 | 222.17 |
| Mar 22–28, 2021 | (Sweden) 2021 World Championships | 6 | 70.38 | 5 | 137.42 | 6 | 207.80 |
| Apr 15–18, 2021 | (Japan) 2021 World Team Trophy | 3 | 77.78 | 2 | 150.29 | 3 (2) | 228.07 |

Results in the 2021–22 season
| Date | Event | SP | | FS | | Total | |
| Date | Event | P | Score | P | Score | P | Score |
|---|---|---|---|---|---|---|---|
| Oct 3, 2021 | 2021 Japan Open | —N/a | —N/a | 4 | 133.26 | 2 | —N/a |
| Oct 13–17, 2021 | (China) 2021 Asian Open Trophy | 1 | 76.70 | 2 | 125.58 | 2 | 202.28 |
| Oct 22–24, 2021 | (United States) 2021 Skate America | 4 | 71.16 | 3 | 144.77 | 4 | 215.93 |
| Nov 12–14, 2021 | (Japan) 2021 NHK Trophy | 1 | 76.56 | 1 | 146.78 | 1 | 223.34 |
| Dec 22–26, 2021 | 2021–22 Japan Championships | 1 | 79.23 | 1 | 154.83 | 1 | 234.06 |
| Feb 4–7, 2022 | (China) 2022 Winter Olympics (Team event) | —N/a | —N/a | 1 | 148.66 | 2 | —N/a |
| Feb 15–17, 2022 | (China) 2022 Winter Olympics | 2 | 79.84 | 3 | 153.29 | 3 | 233.13 |
| Mar 21–27, 2022 | (France) 2022 World Championships | 1 | **80.32** | 1 | 155.77 | 1 | 236.09 |

Results in the 2022–23 season
| Date | Event | SP | | FS | | Total | |
| Date | Event | P | Score | P | Score | P | Score |
|---|---|---|---|---|---|---|---|
| Sep 16–19, 2022 | (Italy) 2022 CS Lombardia Trophy | 1 | 72.93 | 2 | 132.40 | 2 | 205.33 |
| Oct 8, 2022 | 2022 Japan Open | —N/a | —N/a | 1 | 146.66 | 1 | —N/a |
| Oct 21–23, 2022 | (United States) 2022 Skate America | 1 | 71.72 | 1 | 145.89 | 1 | 217.61 |
| Nov 17–20, 2022 | (Japan) 2022 NHK Trophy | 2 | 68.07 | 1 | 133.80 | 2 | 201.87 |
| Dec 8–11, 2022 | (Italy) 2022–23 Grand Prix Final | 1 | 75.86 | 6 | 116.70 | 5 | 192.56 |
| Dec 21–25, 2022 | 2022–23 Japan Championships | 1 | 77.79 | 1 | 155.26 | 1 | 233.05 |
| Jan 13–15, 2023 | (United States) 2023 Winter World University Games | 1 | 78.40 | 2 | 139.02 | 2 | 217.42 |
| Feb 23–26, 2023 | (Netherlands) 2023 International Challenge Cup | 1 | 76.85 | 1 | 151.50 | 1 | 228.35 |
| Mar 20–26, 2023 | (Japan) 2023 World Championships | 1 | 79.24 | 2 | 145.37 | 1 | 224.61 |
| Apr 13–16, 2023 | (Japan) 2023 World Team Trophy | 2 | 72.69 | 2 | 145.75 | 3 (2) | 218.44 |

Results in the 2023–24 season
| Date | Event | SP | | FS | | Total | |
| Date | Event | P | Score | P | Score | P | Score |
|---|---|---|---|---|---|---|---|
| Sep 14–16, 2023 | (Canada) 2023 CS Autumn Classic International | 1 | 75.62 | 1 | 127.58 | 1 | 203.20 |
| Oct 7, 2023 | 2023 Japan Open | —N/a | —N/a | 1 | 149.59 | 1 | —N/a |
| October 27–29, 2023 | 2023 Skate Canada International | 1 | 75.13 | 1 | 151.00 | 1 | 226.13 |
| Nov 17–19, 2023 | (Finland) 2023 Grand Prix of Espoo | 1 | 69.69 | 1 | 135.52 | 1 | 205.21 |
| Dec 7–10, 2023 | (China) 2023–24 Grand Prix Final | 1 | 77.35 | 1 | 148.35 | 1 | 225.70 |
| Dec 20–24, 2023 | 2023–24 Japan Championships | 1 | 78.78 | 1 | 154.34 | 1 | 233.12 |
| Feb 22–25, 2024 | (Netherlands) 2024 International Challenge Cup | 2 | 67.76 | 1 | 144.67 | 1 | 212.43 |
| Mar 18–24, 2024 | (Canada) 2024 World Championships | 4 | 73.29 | 1 | 149.67 | 1 | 222.96 |

Results in the 2024–25 season
| Date | Event | SP | | FS | | Total | |
| Date | Event | P | Score | P | Score | P | Score |
|---|---|---|---|---|---|---|---|
| Sep 13–15, 2024 | (Italy) 2024 CS Lombardia Trophy | 2 | 73.53 | 4 | 126.41 | 3 | 199.94 |
| Oct 25–27, 2024 | 2024 Skate Canada International | 1 | 74.97 | 2 | 126.24 | 1 | 201.21 |
| Nov 8–10, 2024 | (Japan) 2024 NHK Trophy | 1 | 78.93 | 1 | 152.95 | 1 | 231.88 |
| Dec 5–8, 2024 | (France) 2024–25 Grand Prix Final | 4 | 63.98 | 3 | 137.15 | 3 | 201.13 |
| Dec 19–22, 2024 | 2024–25 Japan Championships | 1 | 78.92 | 1 | 149.76 | 1 | 228.68 |
| Feb 11–13, 2025 | (China) 2025 Asian Winter Games | 1 | 75.03 | 2 | 136.87 | 2 | 211.90 |
| Mar 25–30, 2025 | (United States) 2025 World Championships | 5 | 71.03 | 2 | 146.95 | 2 | 217.98 |
| Apr 17–20, 2025 | (Japan) 2025 World Team Trophy | 2 | 75.54 | 3 | 145.00 | 2 (2) | 220.54 |

Results in the 2025–26 season
| Date | Event | SP | | FS | | Total | |
| Date | Event | P | Score | P | Score | P | Score |
|---|---|---|---|---|---|---|---|
| Sep 5–7, 2025 | (Japan) 2025 CS Kinoshita Group Cup | 4 | 65.25 | 2 | 138.39 | 2 | 203.64 |
| Oct 17–19, 2025 | 2025 Grand Prix de France | 2 | 76.20 | 2 | 148.03 | 2 | 224.23 |
| Nov 7–9, 2025 | (Japan) 2025 NHK Trophy | 1 | 77.05 | 1 | 150.13 | 1 | 227.18 |
| Dec 4–7, 2025 | (Japan) 2025–26 Grand Prix Final | 5 | 69.40 | 1 | 149.40 | 3 | 218.80 |
| Dec 18–21, 2025 | 2025–26 Japan Championships | 1 | 79.43 | 1 | 154.93 | 1 | 234.36 |
| Feb 6–8, 2026 | (Italy) 2026 Winter Olympics – Team event | 1 | 78.88 | 1 | 148.62 | 2 | —N/a |
| Feb 17–19, 2026 | (Italy) 2026 Winter Olympics | 2 | 77.23 | 2 | 147.67 | 2 | 224.90 |
| Mar 24–29, 2026 | (Czech Republic) 2026 World Championships | 1 | 79.31 | 1 | **158.97** | 1 | **238.28** |

=== Junior level ===
- Small medals for the short program and free skating are only awarded at ISU Championships.

Results in the 2012–13 season
| Date | Event | SP | | FS | | Total | |
| Date | Event | P | Score | P | Score | P | Score |
|---|---|---|---|---|---|---|---|
| Nov 17–28, 2012 | 2012–13 Japan Junior Championships | 13 | 46.56 | 7 | 92.96 | 9 | 139.52 |

Results in the 2013–14 season
| Date | Event | SP | | FS | | Total | |
| Date | Event | P | Score | P | Score | P | Score |
|---|---|---|---|---|---|---|---|
| Aug 8–11, 2013 | (Thailand) 2013 Asian Open Trophy | 1 | 53.20 | 1 | 102.28 | 1 | 155.48 |
| Oct 2–5, 2013 | 2013 JGP Czech Republic | 7 | 52.80 | 6 | 93.69 | 6 | 146.49 |
| Nov 22–24, 2013 | 2013–14 Japan Junior Championships | 8 | 47.14 | 4 | 101.64 | 6 | 148.78 |
| Dec 20–23, 2013 | 2013–14 Japan Senior Championships | 9 | 56.29 | 16 | 95.56 | 15 | 151.85 |
| Mar 14–16, 2014 | (Netherlands) 2014 International Challenge Cup | 1 | 54.98 | 2 | 98.89 | 1 | 153.87 |

Results in the 2014–15 season
| Date | Event | SP | | FS | | Total | |
| Date | Event | P | Score | P | Score | P | Score |
|---|---|---|---|---|---|---|---|
| Sep 11–14, 2014 | 2014 JGP Japan | 6 | 52.70 | 7 | 93.46 | 7 | 146.16 |
| Nov 22–24, 2014 | 2014–15 Japan Junior Championships | 4 | 57.35 | 2 | 111.47 | 2 | 168.82 |
| Dec 26–28, 2014 | 2014–15 Japan Senior Championships | 7 | 57.81 | 6 | 109.65 | 6 | 167.46 |
| Mar 2–8, 2015 | (Estonia) 2015 World Junior Championships | 4 | 58.72 | 6 | 107.53 | 6 | 166.25 |

Results in the 2015–16 season
| Date | Event | SP | | FS | | Total | |
| Date | Event | P | Score | P | Score | P | Score |
|---|---|---|---|---|---|---|---|
| Aug 2–5, 2015 | (Thailand) 2015 Asian Open Trophy (S) | 3 | 39.64 | 3 | 99.36 | 3 | 139.00 |
| Aug 26–30, 2015 | 2015 JGP Latvia | 3 | 58.75 | 2 | 112.20 | 2 | 170.95 |
| Sep 23–27, 2015 | 2015 JGP Poland | 3 | 56.89 | 4 | 101.55 | 4 | 158.44 |
| Nov 21–23, 2015 | 2015–16 Japan Junior Championships | 5 | 58.96 | 6 | 111.76 | 5 | 170.72 |
| Dec 24–27, 2015 | 2015–16 Japan Senior Championships | 17 | 53.90 | 12 | 111.60 | 13 | 165.50 |
| Feb 12–21, 2016 | (Norway) 2016 Winter Youth Olympics | 5 | 56.25 | 6 | 98.98 | 6 | 155.23 |

Results in the 2016–17 season
| Date | Event | SP | | FS | | Total | |
| Date | Event | P | Score | P | Score | P | Score |
|---|---|---|---|---|---|---|---|
| Aug 24–27, 2016 | 2016 JGP France | 2 | 64.12 | 2 | 114.74 | 2 | 178.86 |
| Sep 7–11, 2016 | 2016 JGP Japan | 1 | 65.66 | 2 | 122.15 | 1 | 187.81 |
| Nov 18–20, 2016 | 2016–17 Japan Junior Championships | 1 | 67.45 | 1 | 124.52 | 1 | 191.97 |
| Dec 8–11, 2016 | (France) 2016–17 Junior Grand Prix Final | 2 | 64.48 | 4 | 111.85 | 3 | 176.33 |
| Dec 22–25, 2016 | 2016–17 Japan Senior Championships | 6 | 63.36 | 9 | 120.64 | 7 | 184.00 |
| Mar 13–19, 2017 | (Taiwan) 2017 World Junior Championships | 3 | 67.78 | 3 | 127.76 | 3 | 195.54 |

== Other activity ==
On May 7, 2026, it was revealed that Sakamoto was chosen, together with Kotaro Koizumi and Hey! Say! JUMP's Ryosuke Yamada, as ambassador for the NTV yearly SDGs campaign "Good for the Planet Week".
