= Sonoko Nakano =

Japanese figure skating coach and choreographer

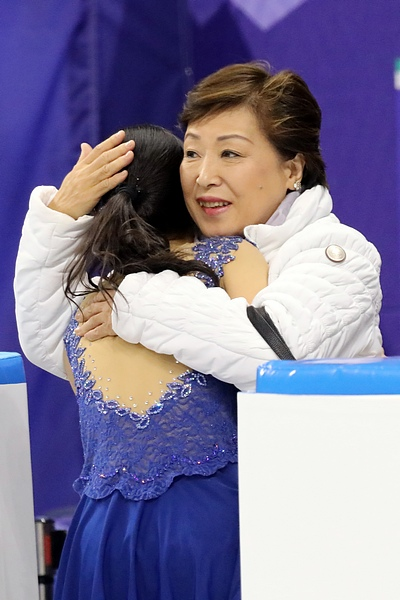
- Nakano at the 2017 Four Continents Championships

Personal information
- Native name: 中野園子
- Born: October 16, 1952 (age 74) Kobe, Hyōgo Prefecture, Japan

Sonoko Nakano (中野園子, Nakano Sonoko; born October 16, 1952) is a Japanese figure skating coach.

Nakano is best known for coaching Kaori Sakamoto, a four-time Olympic medalist and four-time World champion, and Mai Mihara, a two-time Four Continents and the 2022–23 Grand Prix Final champion, for their entire careers.

== Personal life ==
Nakano was born on October 16, 1952 in Kobe, Hyōgo Prefecture. She is a graduate of Nihon University.

== Coaching career ==
Nakano coaches alongside Mitsuko Graham, Masahiro Kawagoe, and Sei Kawahara for the Kobe Figure Skating Club. Following the 1995 Kobe earthquake, Nakano cycled to check on the safety students.

Nakano's team originally trained in rinks in Port Island, Kobe, Himeji, and Osaka as the original rink in Kobe was only open from autumn through spring, up until a full-year facility was built in Nishinomiya in 2013. As of June 2025, the team trains out of the Sysmex Kobe Ice Campus, a new full-year facility in Kobe.

Nakano is a vice chairman of the Japan Figure Skating Instructor Association. She occasionally choreographs for her skaters.

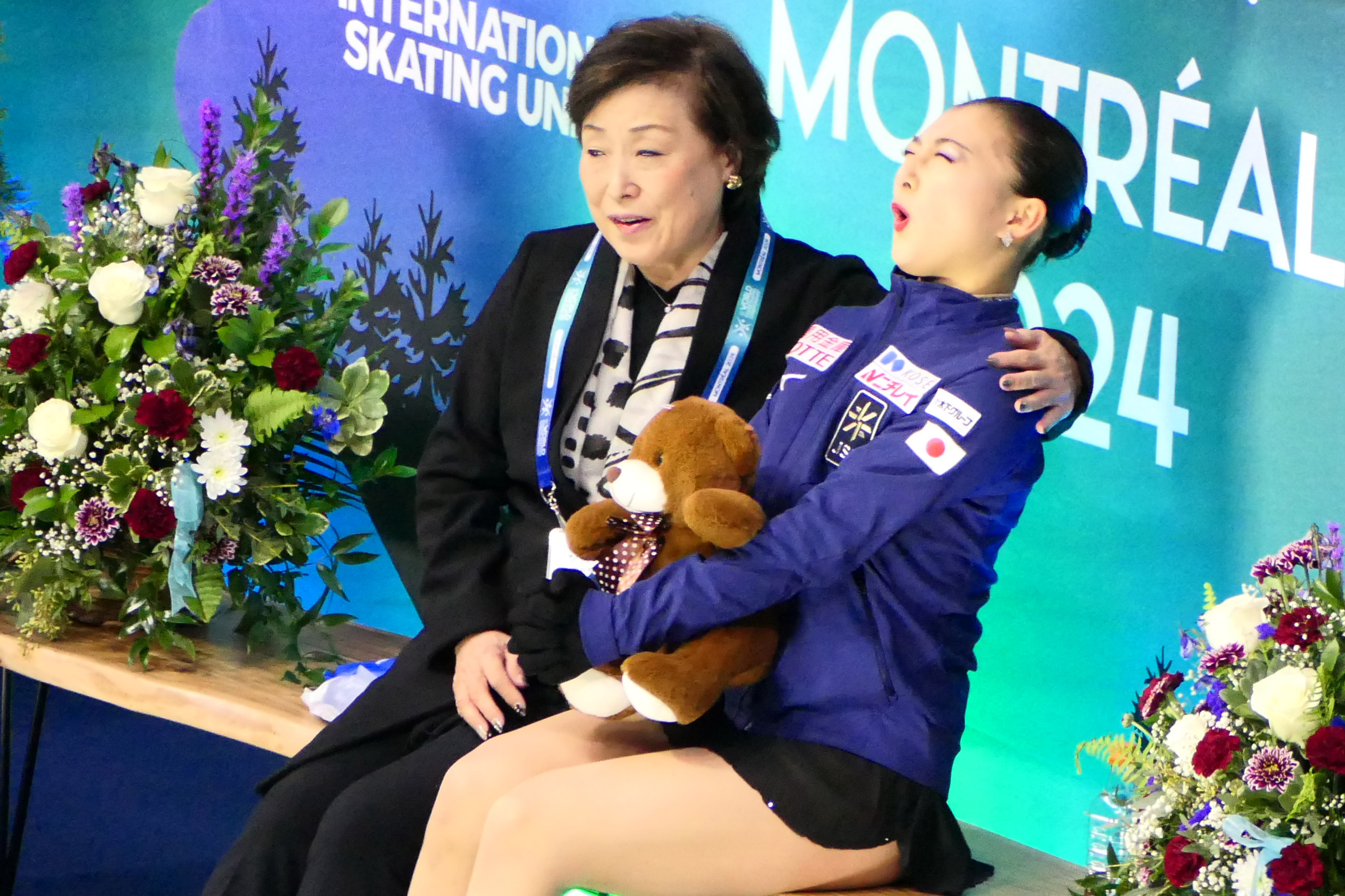
Nakano with Kaori Sakamoto at the 2024 World Championships

Nakano inspired her student Kaori Sakamoto to want to become a coach. After Sakamoto won the silver medal at the 2026 Winter Olympics, Nakano told her: "You won silver, Kaori. That means it’s now your turn to try to raise a gold medallist." She remarked that following their coach-student relationship ending with Sakamoto's retirement: "This time, I need to teach her how to teach technique, not technique. That's the only thing that will change."

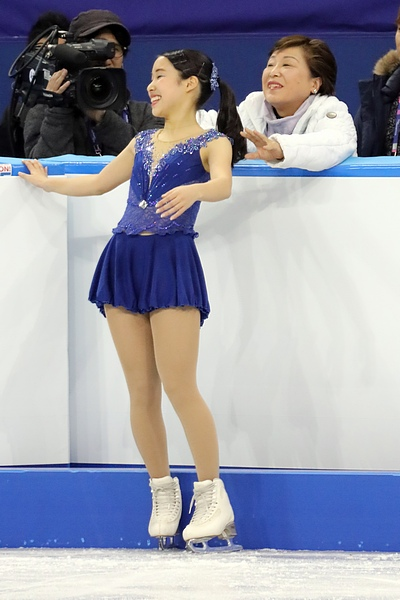
Nakano with Mai Mihara at the 2017 Four Continents Championships

Her current students include:

- Saki Miyake
- Rena Uezono

Her former students include:

- Yōko Ishino
- Ayumi Kagotani
- Mai Mihara
- Rin Nitaya
- Kaori Sakamoto
- Tatsuya Tsuboi
