= Sei Kawahara =

Japanese figure skater

Personal information
- Native name: 川原星
- Born: December 17, 1995 (age 30) Kurume, Fukuoka, Japan
- Height: 1.69 m (5 ft 6 1/2 in)

Figure skating career
- Country: Japan
- Coach: Miwa Ishihara, Kensuke Nakaniwa
- Skating club: Fukuoka University
- Began skating: 2006
- Retired: 2018

Sei Kawahara (Japanese: 川原星, born December 17, 1995) is a Japanese figure skater. He won one medal on the ISU Junior Grand Prix series and made his Grand Prix debut at the 2015 Skate Canada International.

== Post–competitive career ==
Kawahara works as a coach and choreographer with Sonoko Nakano and Mitsuko Graham in Kobe. He also coaches women's figure skaters Kaori Sakamoto and Mai Mihara.

== Programs ==
Season	Short program	Free skating
2017–18	Fly Me to the Moon by Bart Howard	The Mission by Ennio Morricone; Nella Fantasia
2016–17	Tango de los exilados by Vanessa-Mae, Walter Taieb	The Mission by Ennio Morricone; Nella Fantasia
2015–16	Tango de los exilados by Vanessa-Mae, Walter Taieb	Piano Concerto (Shukumei) by Akira Senju
2014–15	The Umbrellas of Cherbourg by Michel Legrand	Asturias (Leyenda) by Isaac Albéniz
2013–14	The Umbrellas of Cherbourg by Michel Legrand	The Last Samurai by Hans Zimmer
2012–13	Sing, Sing, Sing by Louis Prima	The Last Samurai by Hans Zimmer
2011–12	Sing, Sing, Sing by Louis Prima	Lorelei by Raúl Di Blasio
2010–11	Don Quixote by Ludwig Minkus arr. by John Lanchbery; Don Quixote by Ludwig Minkus	The Mummy by Jerry Goldsmith

== Competitive highlights ==
GP: Grand Prix; CS: Challenger Series; JGP: Junior Grand Prix

International
Event	08–09	09–10	10–11	11–12	12–13	13–14	14–15	15–16	16–17	17–18
GP Skate Canada								10th		
CS Nebelhorn									9th	
Universiade									20th	
Golden Spin			8th							
International: Junior or novice
JGP Austria				10th	5th					
JGP Croatia					8th					
JGP Czech Rep.							3rd			
JGP Germany							5th			
JGP Latvia				6th						
JGP Mexico						7th				
JGP Poland						9th				
JGP Romania			10th							
Challenge Cup						1st J				
Mont Blanc		2nd J								
Printemps					3rd J					
National
Japan			28th	16th	17th			12th	11th	12th
Japan Junior	11th	21st	7th	4th	5th	7th	11th			
