= Yuzuru Hanyu =

Japanese figure skater (born 1994)

- 羽生 結弦
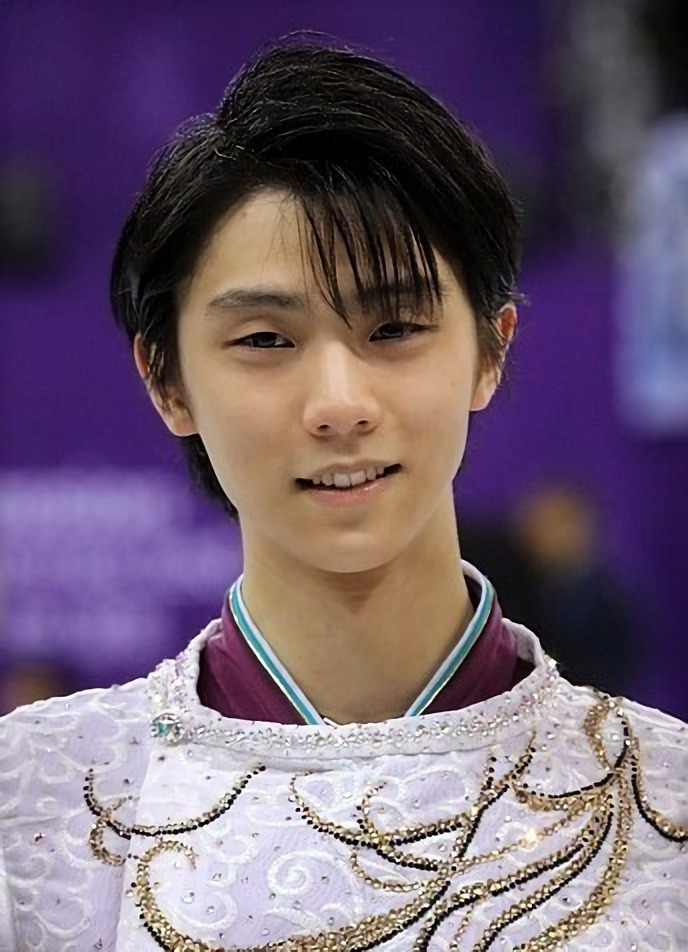
- Hanyu at the 2018 Winter Olympics in Pyeongchang
- Born: December 7, 1994 (age 31); Sendai, Miyagi, Japan
- Education: Waseda University (2020)
- Occupations: Figure skater; Ice show producer and director; author
- Height: 1.72 m (5 ft 8 in)
- Awards: People's Honor Award (2018); Medal of Honor (2014, 2018); Kikuchi Kan Prize (2022)

Yuzuru Hanyu article series
- Skating career: Olympic seasons; Career achievements; Figure skating programs
- Other works: Bibliography
- Solo ice shows: Prologue; Gift; Repray Tour; Echoes of Life Tour; Realive; White Box Tour
- Ensemble ice shows: Fantasy on Ice; Continues with Wings; Yuzuru Hanyu Notte Stellata
- Figure skating career
- Country: Japan
- Discipline: Men's singles
- Began skating: 1998
- Competitive: 2004–2022
- Professional: 2022–present
- Highest WS: 1st (2014–2018)

Medal record
Event	Gold medal – first place	Silver medal – second place	Bronze medal – third place
Olympic Games	2	0	0
World Championships	2	3	2
Four Continents Championships	1	3	0
Grand Prix Final	4	2	0
Japan Championships	6	1	1
World Team Trophy	1	0	2
World Junior Championships	1	0	0
Junior Grand Prix Final	1	0	0
Medal list
Olympic Games
Gold medal – first place	2014 Sochi	Singles
Gold medal – first place	2018 Pyeongchang	Singles
World Championships
Gold medal – first place	2014 Saitama	Singles
Gold medal – first place	2017 Helsinki	Singles
Silver medal – second place	2015 Shanghai	Singles
Silver medal – second place	2016 Boston	Singles
Silver medal – second place	2019 Saitama	Singles
Bronze medal – third place	2012 Nice	Singles
Bronze medal – third place	2021 Stockholm	Singles
Four Continents Championships
Gold medal – first place	2020 Seoul	Singles
Silver medal – second place	2011 Taipei	Singles
Silver medal – second place	2013 Osaka	Singles
Silver medal – second place	2017 Gangneung	Singles
Grand Prix Final
Gold medal – first place	2013–14 Fukuoka	Singles
Gold medal – first place	2014–15 Barcelona	Singles
Gold medal – first place	2015–16 Barcelona	Singles
Gold medal – first place	2016–17 Marseille	Singles
Silver medal – second place	2012–13 Sochi	Singles
Silver medal – second place	2019–20 Turin	Singles
Japan Championships
Gold medal – first place	2012–13 Sapporo	Singles
Gold medal – first place	2013–14 Saitama	Singles
Gold medal – first place	2014–15 Nagano	Singles
Gold medal – first place	2015–16 Sapporo	Singles
Gold medal – first place	2020–21 Nagano	Singles
Gold medal – first place	2021–22 Saitama	Singles
Silver medal – second place	2019–20 Tokyo	Singles
Bronze medal – third place	2011–12 Kadoma	Singles
World Team Trophy
Gold medal – first place	2017 Tokyo	Team
Bronze medal – third place	2015 Tokyo	Team
Bronze medal – third place	2021 Osaka	Team
World Junior Championships
Gold medal – first place	2010 The Hague	Singles
Junior Grand Prix Final
Gold medal – first place	2009–10 Tokyo	Singles

YouTube information
- Channel: HANYU YUZURU
- Years active: 2022–present
- Genre: Figure skating
- Subscribers: 815 thousand
- Views: 50 million
- Last updated: September 2, 2026

Yuzuru Hanyu (羽生 結弦, Ha'nyū Yuzuru; Hiragana: はにゅう ゆづる; born December 7, 1994) is a Japanese figure skater and ice show producer. Widely recognized as one of the greatest figure skaters in history (Note: Various figure skating experts and news outlets have called Hanyu one of the greatest, or made the case for him as the greatest skater in history, including Olympic champion Nathan Chen, world champions Kurt Browning and Brian Orser, and figure skating analyst Jackie Wong.) for his well-rounded skills, achievements, innovations, longevity, popularity, and impact on the sport, he started skating at four years old and competed in the men's singles discipline from 2004 to 2022. Hanyu is the first men's singles skater in 66 years since Dick Button to win back-to-back Olympic titles (2014, 2018), and the first Asian Olympic champion in that discipline. He is a two-time World champion (2014, 2017), six-time Japanese national champion (2012–2015, 2020–2021), and the first singles skater to win four consecutive Grand Prix Finals (2013–2016). With his win at the 2020 Four Continents Championships, he became the first skater in men's singles to complete the Super Slam, having won all major international junior and senior titles in the course of his career. He is also the only singles skater to be ranked first in the ISU World Standings for five consecutive seasons (2014–2018). Hanyu broke world records 19 times, the most in singles since the introduction of the ISU Judging System in 2003, and was the first skater to land a quadruple loop jump in international competition among other achievements. He is also the only male single skater besides German Jan Hoffmann to win seven world championship medals in the post-war era since 1946.

According to Nikkei Asia, Hanyu's move to professional level in 2022 marked the "end of an era" in competitive figure skating. His first major work as a professional is the ongoing Yuzuru Hanyu Ice Story series, with its prelude event Prologue (2022) being the first solo ice show and the Repray Tour (2023–24) the first solo tour production in figure skating. His second solo show Gift (2023) was the first ice skating event to be held at Tokyo Dome, breaking the record for the largest ice show audience with 35,000 people. Hanyu's Ice Story series, which has attracted more than 200,000 spectators in total by April 2026, opened a new genre of performing art and entertainment, weaving live skating performances into comprehensive, philosophical stories with elaborate on-screen narration.

At 16 years old, Hanyu experienced the 2011 Tōhoku earthquake and tsunami in his hometown of Sendai, which fundamentally shaped his life and career, having participated in different charity events and dedicated various performances to the victims of the disaster. He is also the chairperson of Nippon TV's annual 3.11 commemoration ice show Yuzuru Hanyu Notte Stellata, inaugurated in 2023. Since the earthquake, Hanyu has donated a cumulative total of more than $3 million USD for reconstruction, disaster prevention, and other humanitarian efforts. The donations include the full prize money of his Olympic wins and all royalties from his best-selling autobiography series Blue Flames I–IV.

In recognition of his achievements, Hanyu became the youngest recipient of the People's Honor Award (2018), bestowed by the Prime Minister of Japan, received Japan's Medal of Honor with purple ribbon twice (2014, 2018) and was awarded the Kikuchi Kan Prize (2022). He is the first figure skater to be nominated for the Laureus World Sports Award (2019) and was named the Most Valuable Skater at the inaugural ISU Skating Awards (2020). He was also featured in prestigious lists, such as Forbes' 30 Under 30 Asia (2018), ESPN's top 25 of greatest Olympians of the 21st century (#10), and the International Sports Press Association's list of most impactful male athletes of the last 100 years (#6) (both 2024). In 2022, he was ranked sixth in the list of most-searched athletes on Google Search worldwide.

== Early life ==
Yuzuru Hanyu was born on December 7, 1994, in Izumi ward, Sendai, Japan, the second child to father Hidetoshi Hanyu, a junior high school teacher, and mother Yumi Hanyu, a former clerk at a department store. Hanyu's given name 結弦 (Yuzuru; lit. 'tie the bowstring') comes from the idea of "living a dignified life like a strongly-tied string of a bow,” thus symbolizing confidence, strength, and straightness. Hanyu's father was an advisor to the baseball school club and recommended the sport to his son, but Hanyu eventually decided to pursue a career in figure skating. His mother used to make the costumes in his early career, including the free skate costume for the 2010–11 season, which was designed by American figure skater Johnny Weir. In 2012, she moved with Hanyu to Toronto, Canada, and accompanied him during training, while his father and older sister, Saya, stayed in Japan.

At the age of two, Hanyu was diagnosed with asthma, a condition that gradually improved with time yet negatively affected his stamina, especially during his junior career. He began skating at the age of four at Ice Rink Sendai (formerly Konami Sports Club) in Izumi, after coach Mami Yamada had suggested he try the sport instead of being a nuisance during his sister's training. Yamada noted Hanyu's impatience when he first got onto the ice, but also praised him for his sincerity. Coaching him until the end of his second grade in elementary school, Yamada had to move to another prefecture and asked Shōichirō Tsuzuki, former coach of Japan's first World medalist, Minoru Sano, to train Hanyu and "not put his talent to waste". Hanyu described Tsuzuki's practice sessions as particularly strict and exhausting, tempting him to skip lessons at times, but he appreciated Tsuzuki's approach to build a solid foundation of skills and focus on basic training, noting: "He placed so much emphasis on skating and the Axel jump. Perhaps that made me confident to this day that the Axel is my forte."

== Competitive skating career ==
=== Novice and junior career (2004–2010) ===
Hanyu competed for the first time in the 2004–05 season, winning gold at the Japan Championships in the Novice B category, the lower of the two novice level categories. His home rink then closed due to financial issues, forcing him to switch to the Katsuyama Skating Club in Aoba ward, Sendai. The same year, Shōichirō Tsuzuki moved to Yokohama, and Nanami Abe became Hanyu's main coach and choreographer, guiding him until 2012. On weekends, Hanyu travelled three hours from Sendai to Yokohama for additional lessons at Tsuzuki's new skating club. In summer 2006, at 11 years old, Hanyu's confidence showed up when initiating a spin battle against that year's Olympic silver medalist, Stéphane Lambiel, who was known for his world-class spins. Hanyu suffered a disarming defeat, which he remembered as an important career lesson: "After competing against him, I decided to improve my spins as well. You will definitely improve, learning from [the best]." In the 2006–07 season, Hanyu won the bronze medal at the Japan Championships in the Novice A category, which earned him an invitation to the Japan Junior Championships, where he placed seventh. His home rink in Izumi ward eventually reopened in 2007 after being closed for two years. The next season, he placed first at the Japan Championships in the Novice A category and won the bronze medal at the Japan Junior Championships.

In 2008–09, Hanyu moved up to junior level and made his international debut in the ISU Junior Grand Prix at the Merano Cup in Italy, where he placed fifth. The same season, he won gold at the Japan Junior Championships, becoming the youngest male skater with 13 years to win the event. This result earned him an invitation to the Japan Senior Championships for the first time, where he placed eighth. His national junior title also qualified him for the 2009 World Junior Championships in February, where he finished 12th with an ISU personal best score of 161.77 points in the combined total. In that season, Hanyu had included the triple Axel, a jump with three and a half revolutions, in his programs for the first time, though receiving negative grades of execution (GOE) for all three attempts. The following 2009–10 season marked the beginning of an 11-year-long quest for the first Super Slam in the men's singles discipline, with wins at the ISU Junior Grand Prix Final and World Junior Championships. Hanyu placed first at both of his Grand Prix assignments, in Poland and Croatia, and entered the Final as the top qualifier, which he won with a new personal best score of 206.77 points. At Junior Nationals, he successfully defended his title from the previous season, qualifying him for the Senior Nationals, where he finished sixth. Based on his results, Hanyu was selected to compete at the 2010 World Junior Championships, winning gold after placing third in the short program and first in the free skate with a new personal best score of 216.10 points. Hanyu became the fourth and youngest Japanese man to win the junior world title. In that season, he had significantly improved the quality of the triple Axel, his most difficult technical element at that time, having landed nine jumps with positive GOE in ten attempts.

=== First Olympic cycle (2010–2014) ===
==== 2010–11 season: International senior debut ====
In the 2010–11 season, Hanyu moved up to senior level at 15 years old, facing significant competition in the Japanese men's field, including Daisuke Takahashi, Nobunari Oda, Takahiko Kozuka, and Tatsuki Machida, who all had finished ahead of him at the previous Japan Championships. Hanyu skated his short program to "White Legend" from Pyotr Tchaikovsky's ballet Swan Lake, performed by Japanese violinist Ikuko Kawai, and used Zigeunerweisen by Pablo de Sarasate for the free skate. He gave his international senior debut at the 2010 NHK Trophy, where he landed his first successful quadruple jump at an ISU-sanctioned event; a quad toe loop. He placed fourth overall at the competition and seventh at the subsequent Rostelecom Cup, missing out on a medal at his first two senior Grand Prix events. At the 2010–11 Japan Championships, Hanyu was in second place after the short program, but faltered in the free skate and finished fourth overall. The next year, at the 2011 Four Continents Championships, he won his first medal at a main international senior competition, placing second behind Daisuke Takahashi with a new personal best score of 228.01 points. At 16 years old, Hanyu became the youngest medalist at the Four Continents Championships.

On March 11, 2011, he was skating at his home rink in Sendai when the 2011 Tōhoku earthquake and tsunami struck his hometown and the Tōhoku region. With his house being damaged, he had to spend the following three days with his family at an evacuation center. A month later, on April 7, the water pipes at his rink burst as a result of an aftershock, known as the April 2011 Miyagi earthquake, and Hanyu was forced to move his training base to Yokohama and Hachinohe until his home rink reopened on July 24, 2011. In the meantime, he had participated in 60 ice shows across Japan, using them as an opportunity to get additional practice time and raise money for the areas affected by the disaster.

==== 2011–12 season: First world medal ====
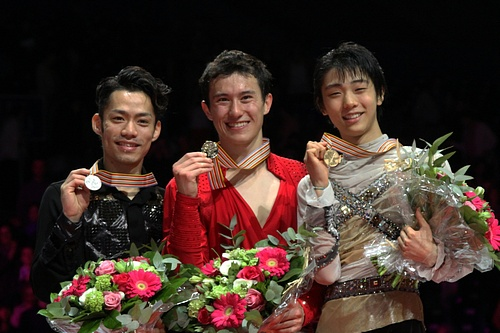
Hanyu with Patrick Chan (center) and Daisuke Takahashi (left) at the 2012 World Championships podium

In the 2011–12 season, Hanyu skated his short program to Alexander Scriabin's Étude in D-sharp minor and the free skate to a medley of Romeo + Juliet by Craig Armstrong. The choreographies were created by Nanami Abe in collaboration with Natalia Bestemianova and Igor Bobrin from Russia. Hanyu opened the season at the Nebelhorn Trophy, where he won his first gold medal at an international senior competition. During the event, he shared his career goals with the media: "My goals for the future are to land all quad jumps in competition. I would also like to learn the quad Axel. Another goal is to win the next two Olympics, or at least win medals." For the 2011–12 Grand Prix series, he was assigned to the Cup of China, where he placed fourth, and the Rostelecom Cup, which he won with one of the closest margins of 0.03 points ahead of Javier Fernández from Spain. The results qualified him for his first senior Grand Prix Final, where he finished fourth. Hanyu then won the bronze medal at the Japan Championships, earning a spot on the Japanese team for the 2012 World Championships. At his senior Worlds debut, he competed on a sprained ankle, placing seventh in the short program, but with a strong free skate he moved up to third place overall, winning the bronze medal with a new personal best score of 251.06 points. He became the youngest Japanese world medalist, finishing behind then two-time world champion Patrick Chan (gold) and Daisuke Takahashi (silver). After the competition, both skaters acknowledged Hanyu as a potential strong rival in the future.

Upon the conclusion of the 2011–12 season, Hanyu changed coaches, training with Brian Orser and Tracy Wilson at the Toronto Cricket, Skating and Curling Club (Toronto CSCC) in Canada, who had coached Korean single skater Yuna Kim to Olympic gold in 2010 among others. Hanyu's main motivation for the change were the consistent quadruple jumps performed by Orser's student Javier Fernández. According to Hidehito Ito, figure skating director of the Japan Skating Federation, the change was also necessary to "challenge" Hanyu and "raise the level [of his skating] more". The first months, Hanyu was making frequent trips to Toronto, but continued to attend high school in Sendai. After moving to Canada, he increased his on-ice training to 3–4 hours a day, up from 1–2 hours, which had been due to limited ice time in Sendai, schooling, and asthma.

==== 2012–13 season: First national senior title ====
In the first season at his new skating club, Hanyu teamed up with two new choreographers. His short program was created by the 2008 World champion, Jeffrey Buttle, to "Parisienne Walkways" by Gary Moore, and the free skate was choreographed by Canadian David Wilson to a medley of Riccardo Cocciante's musical Notre-Dame de Paris. The coaching change resulted in immediate success; At the 2012 Finlandia Trophy, Hanyu landed his first quadruple Salchow in international competition and won the event. In the Grand Prix series, he scored his first two world records in the short program with 95.07 points at the 2012 Skate America, where he finished second behind Takahiko Kozuka, and 95.32 points at the NHK Trophy, which he won ahead of Daisuke Takahashi. The placements qualified him for the Grand Prix Final, where he finished second behind Takahashi and beat Patrick Chan for the first time in competition. At the Japan Championships, Hanyu won his first national senior title, defeating the reigning and five-time national champion, Daisuke Takahashi, scoring an unofficial record of 285.23 points in the combined total. (Note: The International Skating Union (ISU) only records results that were scored at international competitions; scores achieved at national championships are not officially recognized as new highest scores.) However, his win was not well received among spectators and officials, being booed on the podium, but Orser encouraged his student, saying: "They will come around. Just give it some time and they will come your way." After the 2013 Four Continents Championships, where he had finished second behind Canadian Kevin Reynolds, Hanyu suffered a knee injury and resumed training two weeks prior to the World Championships. An additional ankle sprain in practice forced him to compete on painkillers. Placing ninth after the short program, he fought back with a strong free skate, finishing fourth overall behind Patrick Chan (gold), Denis Ten (silver), and Javier Fernández (bronze), and earning a third spot for Japanese men at the 2014 Winter Olympics.

==== 2013–14 season: First Olympic and world title ====
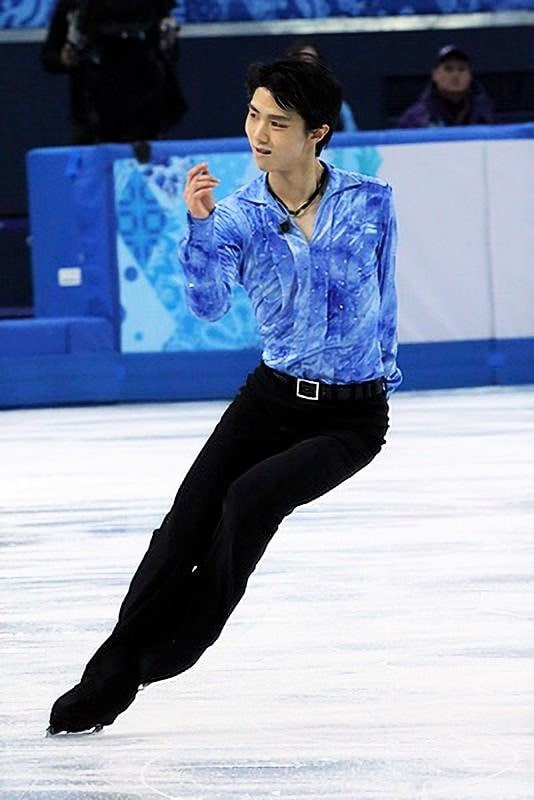
Hanyu skating his program "Parisienne Walkways" at the 2014 Winter Olympics

For his first Olympic season, Hanyu returned to his short program "Parisienne Walkways" and selected Nino Rota's music from Romeo and Juliet for the free skate, choreographed by David Wilson. He launched the season with a win at the 2013 Finlandia Trophy and won silver in both of his Grand Prix events, the 2013 Skate Canada and Trophée Éric Bompard, qualifying him for the 2013–14 Grand Prix Final. At the Final, he set a new world record in the short program with 99.84 points and placed first overall ahead of Patrick Chan (silver) and Nobunari Oda (bronze), winning his first major international senior title. At the Japan Championships, Hanyu went on to win a second national title and was selected to represent the Japanese team at the 2014 Winter Olympics and World Championships. At the Winter Olympics in Sochi, he participated in the men's short program of the figure skating team event, earning ten points for Team Japan. In the individual event, he broke his world record, becoming the first skater to score above 100 points in the short program with a score of 101.45. Despite two falls in the free skate, he managed to win the event with a new Olympic record of 280.09 points in the combined total, finishing ahead of Patrick Chan (silver) and Denis Ten (bronze). With his win, Hanyu became the youngest gold medalist since American Dick Button in 1948. It was the first Olympic title for an Asian skater in the men's singles event and the second for Japan in figure skating, following Shizuka Arakawa's win in the women's event in 2006 in Turin. Hanyu concluded the season with a victory at the World Championships in Saitama, Japan, defeating compatriot Tatsuki Machida with 0.33 points and becoming the first skater to win the Olympics, Worlds, and the Grand Prix Final in the same season after Russian Alexei Yagudin in 2002–01.

=== Second Olympic cycle (2014–2018) ===
==== 2014–15 season: Second Grand Prix Final win ====
After the Sochi Olympics, Hanyu's coaching team was joined by jump expert Ghislain Briand who had coached Canadian skater Elvis Stojko to Olympic silver and two world titles in the 1990s. After Stojko's retirement, Briand was convinced that he would "never have the opportunity to work with another athlete with that much talent, dedication, and passion." However, with Hanyu, Briand had eventually found a student who was open towards his unconventional training methods and analysis of figure skating jumps, stating: "Yuzu is probably the first athlete who really recognizes what I do with him. He is the perfect model and he masters his art like no one else. It sometimes makes the job easier, but his higher level also comes with many challenges."

In the 2014–15 season, Hanyu skated his short program to Frédéric Chopin's Ballade No. 1 in G minor and selected a medley from Andrew Lloyd Webber's musical The Phantom of the Opera for the free skate. The programs were choreographed by Jeffrey Buttle and Shae-Lynn Bourne, respectively, who created all short and free skate programs for Hanyu from 2014 onward. For Hanyu, the 2014–15 season was shaped by a series of injuries, starting with an accident in practice, where he hurt his back and was forced to withdraw from the 2014 Finlandia Trophy. In his first Grand Prix event at the Cup of China, he collided with Chinese skater Yan Han during the free skate warm-up, suffering bruises on his head and chin along with injuring his midriff, left thigh, and right leg. Despite his severe condition, he decided to compete in the free skate and managed to finish second overall behind Maxim Kovtun from Russia. At the NHK Trophy, he came in fourth, securing his place at the Grand Prix Final by one of the slimmest margins of 0.15 points. At the Final, he successfully defended his title with 34.26 points ahead of silver medalist Javier Fernández. In December, Hanyu competed at the 2014–15 Japan Championships, placing first in both segments and winning his third consecutive national title. However, he was forced to withdraw from the exhibition gala due to abdominal pain. He was diagnosed with a tubal residual disease and had to undergo surgery on his bladder, being hospitalized for two weeks and resting for another month. His series of injuries continued with a sprain of his right ankle that forced him to stay in Japan until the 2015 World Championships, where he finished second behind Fernández by less than three points. In April, Hanyu competed for the first time at the ISU World Team Trophy, placing first in both competition segments and earning 24 points to help Team Japan win the bronze medal behind Team USA (gold) and Team Russia (silver).

==== 2015–16 season: Back-to-back world records ====
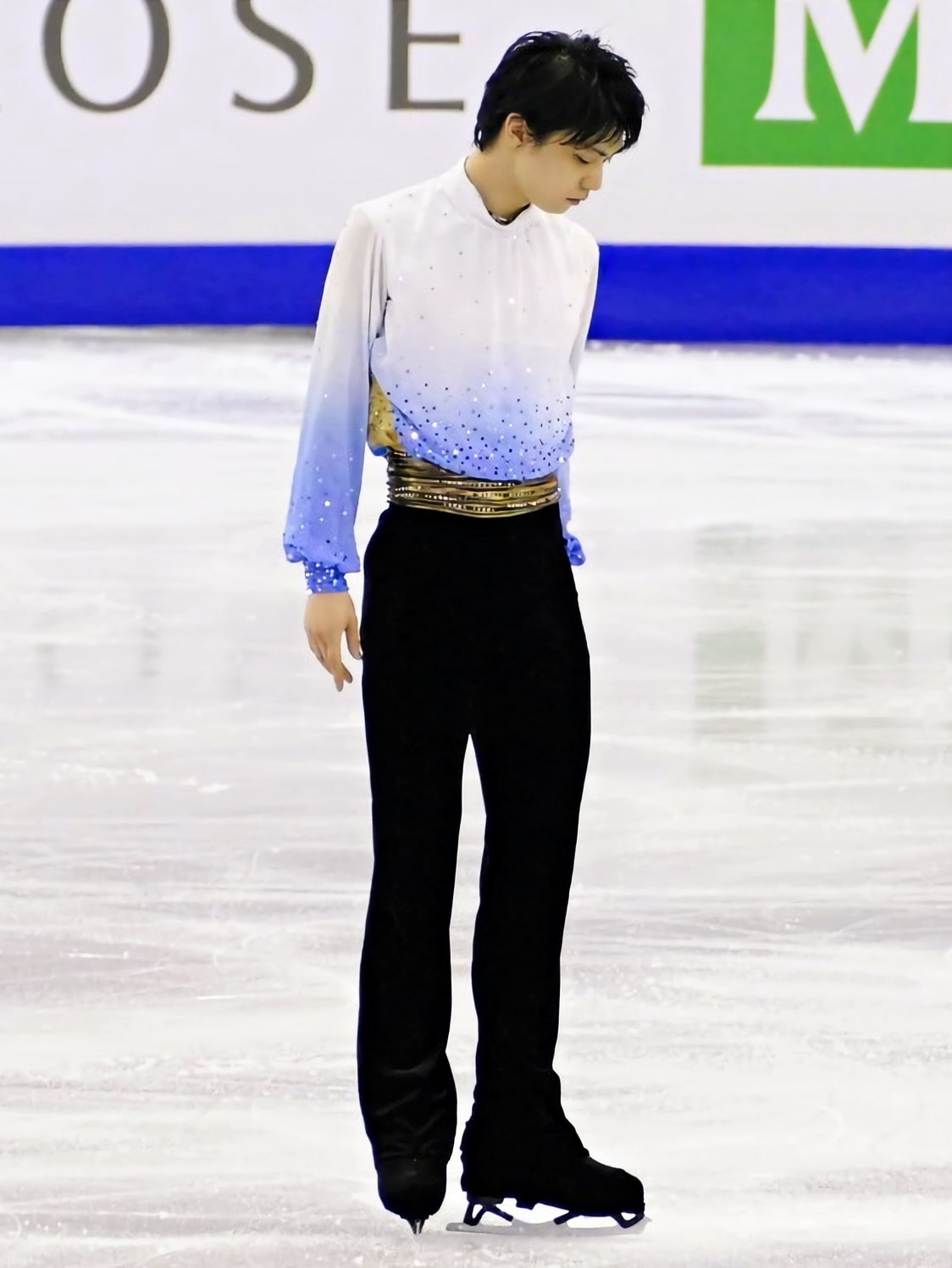
Hanyu skating his short program Ballade No. 1 at the 2015–16 Grand Prix Final

For the 2015–16 season, Hanyu returned to his short program Ballade No. 1 and selected the soundtrack of the films Onmyōji and Onmyōji II by Shigeru Umebayashi for the free skate, portraying the Japanese philosopher and astronomer Abe no Seimei. He started the season by winning gold at the 2015 Autumn Classic, finishing 36 points ahead of silver medalist Nam Nguyen. However, in his first Grand Prix event at Skate Canada, he placed sixth in the short program after invalidating two jumping passes, finishing second overall behind Patrick Chan. Hanyu had been struggling with his short program layout throughout the previous season that included a quad toe loop and a triple Lutz-triple toe loop combination in the second half. While his coach Brian Orser suggested a more "conservative" change, Hanyu decided to add another quad, stating: "I thought by the time of the Pyeongchang Olympics, you cannot win without a short program that includes two quads with difficult entries and exits—plus excellent footwork, spins, and presentation. As the reigning Olympic champion, I want to be absolutely dominant." The offensive strategy earned him a series of back-to-back world records within two weeks: At the 2015 NHK Trophy, he set new highest scores of 106.33 in the short program, 216.07 in the free skate, and 322.40 in the combined total, becoming the first skater to score above 200 and 300 points in the two segments, respectively. It was the first free skate performance of Hanyu's competitive career with all-positive grades of execution, featuring three quadruple jumps and two triple Axels. At the 2015–16 Grand Prix Final in Barcelona, he broke his own records in all three segments with 110.95 points in the short program, 219.48 in the free skate, and 330.43 overall, becoming the first man to win the Grand Prix Final for three consecutive seasons. He finished 37.48 points ahead of Javier Fernández, breaking the record of the largest victory margin at the Grand Prix Final, which was held by Evgeni Plushenko with 35.10 points in 2004. At the Japan Championships, Hanyu won his fourth consecutive national title after placing first in both segments. However, a lingering pain in his left foot worsened throughout the season, threatening his participation at the 2016 World Championships in Boston. At the event, he managed to skate another clean short program of 110.56 points, but faltered in the free skate, placing second overall behind Fernández. It was subsequently announced that Hanyu had been diagnosed with a Lisfranc injury in his left foot, forcing him off ice for two months.

==== 2016–17 season: Second world title ====
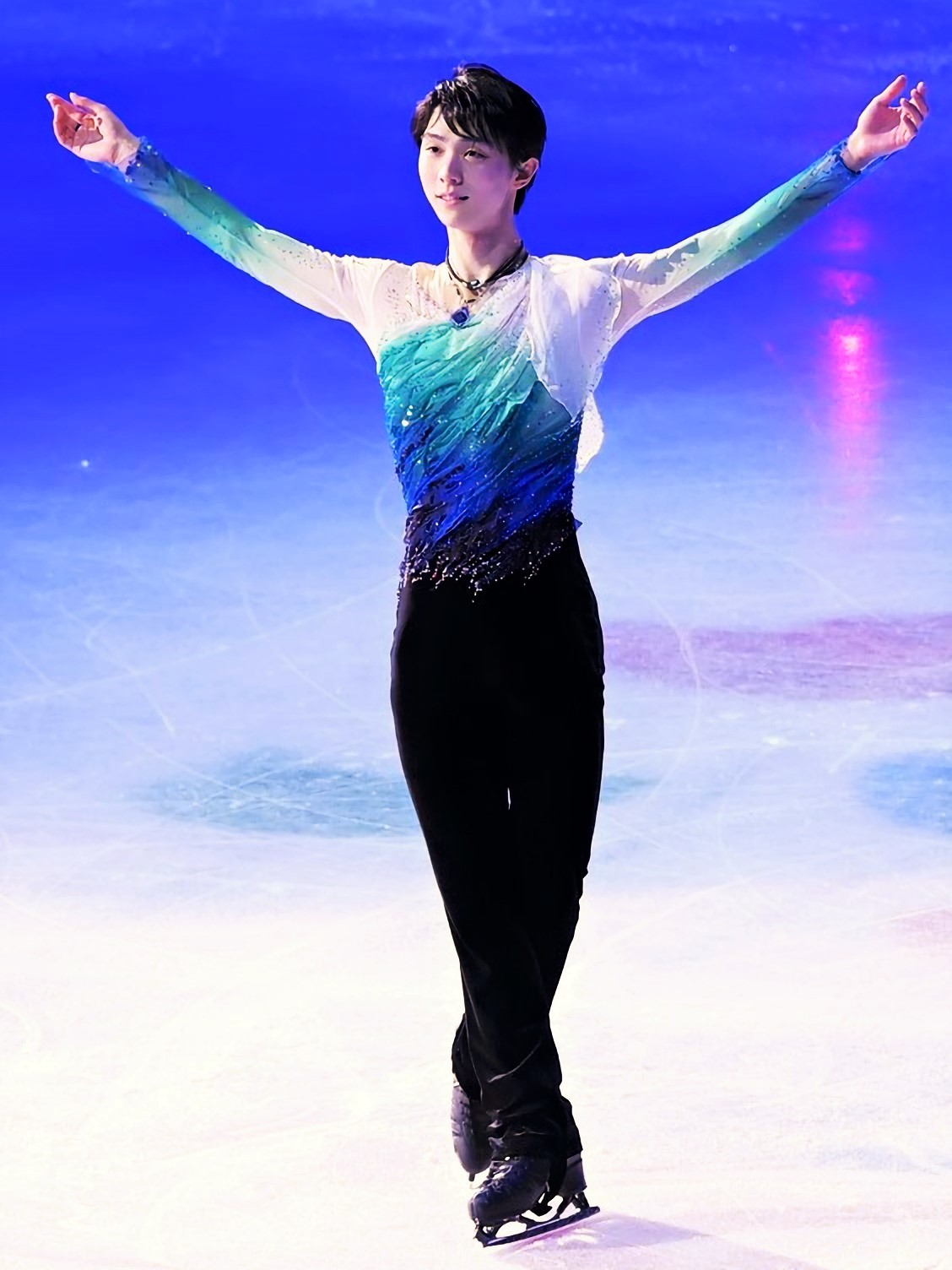
Hanyu at the victory ceremony of the 2017 World Championships in Helsinki

In the 2016–17 season, Hanyu skated to the song "Let's Go Crazy" by Prince in the short program and a medley of "Asian Dream Song" and "View of Silence" by Joe Hisaishi, titled Hope and Legacy, in the free skate. He opened the season with a win at the 2016 Autumn Classic, becoming the first skater to successfully land a quadruple loop jump in competition. After a rough performance at Skate Canada with a second-place finish behind Patrick Chan, Hanyu and Orser had a debate on the approach for the next competitions. While Orser described the performances as a "skeleton of the [planned] choreography" and pleaded to work on the "total package", Hanyu was convinced that landing his jumps was the key to a well-rounded program. The strategy paid off with a win at the NHK Trophy, surpassing the 300 mark with a total score of 301.47. At the 2016–17 Grand Prix Final in Marseille, Hanyu placed first the short program with a season's best score of 106.53. In the free skate, he made mistakes on three jumping passes, placing third in the segment, but his advantage from the short program was enough to stay in first overall, becoming the first male single skater to win four consecutive Grand Prix Finals. After contracting the flu, Hanyu was forced to withdraw from the Japan Championships, missing the event for the first time. At the 2017 Four Continents Championships, he placed third in the short program after turning his quad Salchow into a double, a jump that had caused him issues throughout the season. He fought back with a strong free skate, placing first in the segment and scoring a new season's best of 303.71 points in the combined total. However, he finished second behind American Nathan Chen by about four points, taking the silver medal for a third time. At the World Championships, Hanyu moved up from fifth place after the short program to first with a clean free skate performance that featured four quadruple jumps and two triple Axels. He scored a new world record of 223.20 points in the segment and won his second world title, finishing ahead of his compatriot Shoma Uno (silver) and Jin Boyang from China (bronze). The event marked the first time that all three medalists scored above 300 points. In July 2022, Hanyu named the free skate performance of Hope and Legacy as the one that he thought would represent him best and was the most perfectly executed of his competitive career. At the 2017 World Team Trophy, the final competition of the season, he came in seventh place after an error-filled short program, but placed first in the free skating, becoming the first skater to complete three quadruple jumps in the second half of a skating program. He contributed 18 points to the team score and won gold with Team Japan.

==== 2017–18 season: Second Olympic title ====
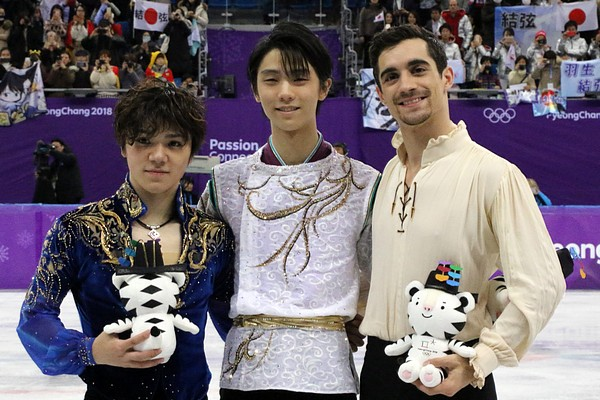
Hanyu with Shoma Uno (left) and Javier Fernández (right) at the 2018 Winter Olympics podium

For the Olympic season, Hanyu returned to his short program Ballade No. 1 and free skate Seimei from the 2015–16 season. At the 2017 CS Autumn Classic, he scored a new world record of 112.72 points in the short program; at the Rostelecom Cup, he landed his first successful quadruple Lutz jump in international competition. However, due to mistakes, he finished second at both events behind Javier Fernández and Nathan Chen, respectively. In November, Hanyu was scheduled to compete at the NHK Trophy, but injured a lateral ligament in his right ankle after a fall on a quad Lutz in practice and was forced to withdraw from all remaining competitions of the year. At the 2018 Winter Olympics in Pyeongchang, he placed first in the short program with a new Olympic record of 111.68 points. In the free skating, he missed a jump combination and stumbled on his final triple Lutz, placing second in the segment, but it was enough to stay in first overall ahead of Shoma Uno (silver) and Javier Fernández (bronze), scoring another Olympic record of 317.85 points in the combined total. With his win, Hanyu became the first male single skater in 66 years to successfully defend his Olympic title since Dick Button in 1952. Upon the conclusion of the Olympics, Hanyu announced the quadruple Axel as his next career goal, a jump that hadn't been landed in competition until then. In order to allow his injured ankle to recover, he decided to withdraw from the World Championships, but remained first in the world standings for a fifth consecutive time at the end of the 2017–18 season.

=== Third Olympic cycle (2018–2022) ===
==== 2018–19 season: Records in new judging system ====
For the 2018–19 season, Hanyu selected his programs with the thought to pay tribute to the skating idols of his childhood. His short program to "Otoñal" by Raúl Di Blasio was dedicated to American skater Johnny Weir who had used the piece for his free skate in the 2004–05 season. Hanyu's new free skate program Origin, a medley of the pieces "Art on Ice" and "Magic Stradivarius" by Edvin Marton, was a homage to Russian Evgeni Plushenko who had skated to the music in his free skate Tribute to Nijinsky in 2003–04. Regarding his program choices, Hanyu remarked: "I am satisfied that as a result [of my Olympic success] I have been released from the pressure that I have to produce results. I think and feel that I can skate for myself from now on. I want to go back to my skating origins."

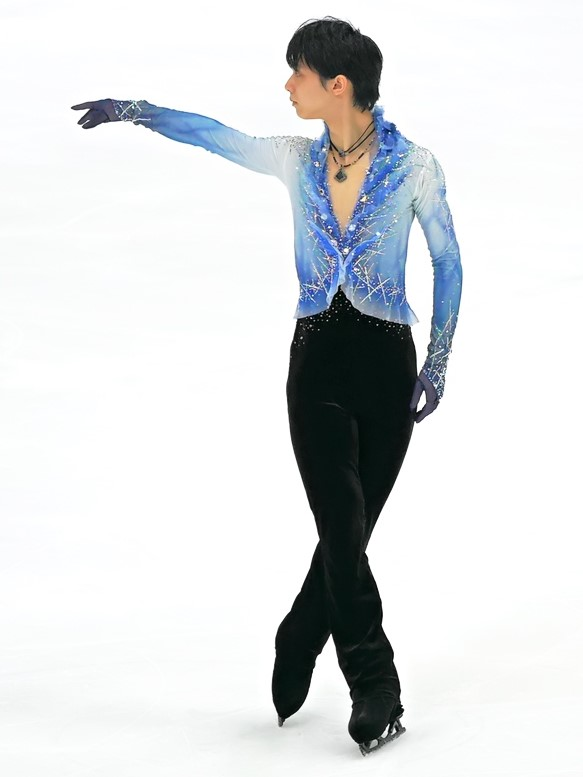
Hanyu in the opening pose of his short program "Otoñal" at the 2018 Helsinki GP

Hanyu opened the season with a win at the 2018 Autumn Classic, but expressed dissatisfaction with his performances, pledging to improve in the next competitions. At the Grand Prix of Helsinki, he set highest scores in all segments under the new +5/-5 GOE judging system, (Note: With the change of the judging system, the ISU decided to start the recording of highest score statistics from zero and declared all records historical that were achieved before the 2018–19 season.) earning 106.69 points in the short program, 190.43 in the free skate, and 297.12 points in the combined total. He also became the first skater to land a quad toe loop-triple Axel jump sequence in competition, winning the event by about 40 points over Michal Březina. At the Rostelecom Cup in Moscow, Hanyu upped the short program record to 110.53 points, but on the following day, he re-injured his right ankle in practice after falling on a quad loop. Yet he opted to compete, aided by painkillers, and managed to place first in all segments, winning gold at both of his Grand Prix assignments for the first time. After the competition, Hanyu admitted: "I thought about withdrawing because of the injury, but it is my choice. I really wanted to skate this program in Russia." Due to the injured ligaments and tendons in his right foot, he was forced to withdraw from the Grand Prix Final and Japan Championships, taking about three weeks of rest and another month of rehabilitation. At the 2019 World Championships in Saitama, Hanyu placed third in the short program after turning his opening quad Salchow into a double, but came back with a strong free skate, becoming the first skater to surpass the 200 and 300 marks in the new judging system with 206.10 points in the free skate and 300.97 in total. However, he finished second behind Nathan Chen who bested both scores later in the event. Similar to his preparations for the Olympics, Hanyu had relied on painkillers before and during the competition to make jumping possible. Due to the injury, he was forced to withdraw from the season's final event, the World Team Trophy.

==== 2019–20 season: Achieving Super Slam ====
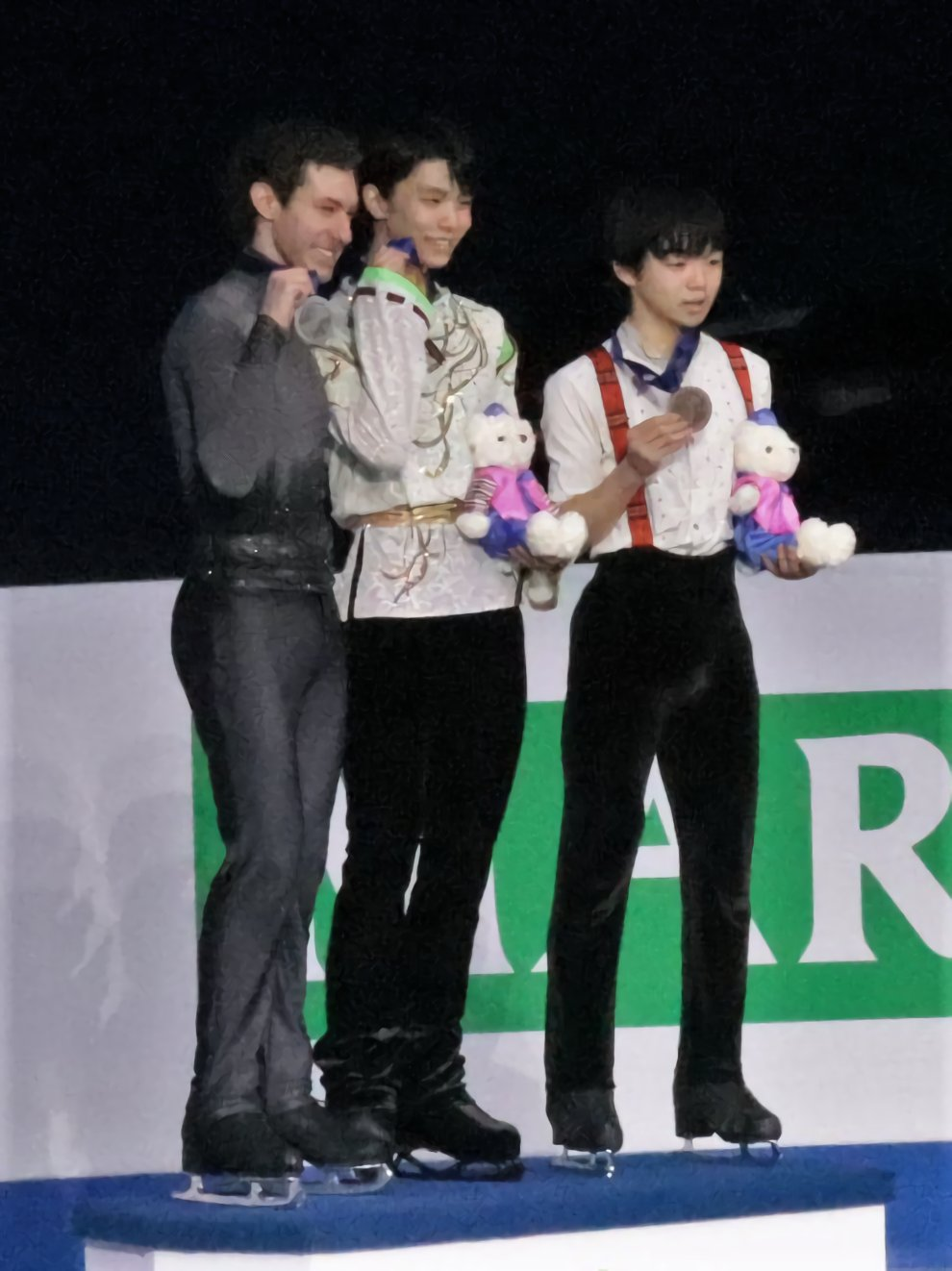
Hanyu (center) at the 2020 Four Continents podium, completing the Super Slam

In 2019–20, Hanyu returned to the short program "Otoñal" and free skate Origin, and launched the new season with a solid win at the 2019 Autumn Classic. Brian Orser praised his student, noting that he has "never seen him at this time of the year to be so focused." In the Grand Prix series, Hanyu won his first gold medal at Skate Canada, scoring new personal bests of 212.99 in the free skate and 322.59 in the combined total. He placed first with a new largest victory margin of 59.82 points ahead of Nam Nguyen, improving his own record of 55.97 points from 2015. Hanyu expressed his satisfaction with the performance, feeling reaffirmed about the image of skating he was aiming for, and added: "For the first in a long time, I genuinely felt being able to win against myself." At the NHK Trophy, he captured another gold with a total score above 300 and more than 55 points ahead of silver medalist Kevin Aymoz. At the Grand Prix Final, Hanyu went into the short program without company due to a delayed arrival of his coach Ghislain Briand. In his performance, he missed a mandatory jump combination, placing second in the segment and trailing Nathan Chen by about 13 points. In the free skate, Hanyu landed five quadruple jumps in one program for the first time in his career, including his first attempt on a quad Lutz since 2017, but missed a planned triple Axel-triple Axel sequence, finishing second overall behind Chen by more than 43 points.

Competing at his first Japanese championships since the 2016–17 season, Hanyu placed first in the short program, 5.01 points ahead of Shoma Uno. Several jump errors in the free skate saw him place third in that segment, behind Uno and Yuma Kagiyama, and win the silver medal overall. It was Hanyu's first loss to Uno. Heading into the Four Continents Championships in Seoul, Hanyu opted to return to his Ballade No. 1 (Chopin) program and his "Seimei" program from prior seasons. Referencing the 2018 Winter Olympics which were held in Pyeongchang, Hanyu noted that while he wanted to win a gold medal once again in South Korea, he wanted to showcase and focus on his own style of figure skating even more. In the short program, Hanyu broke his previous world record with 111.82 points. Hanyu called it "the most perfect performance I've ever done." Despite errors on two of his quad attempts in the free skate, he won that segment as well, taking the gold medal overall with 299.42 points. Hanyu's victory on February 9, made him the first and only male singles skater to win all of the major ISU championship events at the junior and senior levels, a feat known as the Super Slam, previously only achieved by five other competitors in the other three skating disciplines. He was assigned to compete at the World Championships in Montreal, but these were canceled as a result of the coronavirus pandemic. At the ISU Skating Awards in 2020, Hanyu was nominated for Best Costume and Most Valuable Skater for the 2019–2020 season, and proceeded to win the latter.

==== 2020–21 season: Seventh world medal ====
In 2020, due to travel restrictions related to the coronavirus pandemic, Hanyu started to train alone in Sendai with some remote consultation from his coaches. Despite the difficulties of training alone, Hanyu found that it had been a good opportunity to learn how to control and analyze himself, which led him not return to Canada until he turned professional and made Ice Rink Sendai his training base again. Hanyu also opted to receive remote choreography for his programs ever since and has contributed significantly to the choreography of his programs in the 2020–21 season. On August 28, he announced that he would skip the Grand Prix series, citing the risk of COVID-19 for himself, the competition staff, and for his fans who would gather to support him. Despite feeling "conflicted" over whether he should have competed or not as COVID-19 continued and practicing without his coaching team, Hanyu decided to compete in Japanese championships, which doubled as the final qualifier for the upcoming World Championships in Stockholm. He placed first in the short program (103.53 points) and the free skate (215.83 points) with all positive grades of execution on jumping passes and won his fifth national figure skating title with a total score of 319.36 points.

The 2021 World Championships were to be the first direct competition between Hanyu and Nathan Chen since the 2019–20 Grand Prix Final. Hanyu placed first in the short program with a solid performance, 6.02 points ahead of compatriot Yuma Kagiyama. In the free skate, Hanyu opened his program with two quadruple jumps and a triple Axel but received negative grades of execution for all three of them. Scoring 182.20 points, he placed fourth in the free skate and third overall, behind Chen and Kagiyama. It was the first competition Hanyu had placed below second since 2014; however, he became the first male single skater besides German Jan Hoffmann to win seven World medals in the post-war era since 1946. On the following day, Hanyu confirmed the report of his asthma attack by overseas media. He stated that he felt a little painful after finishing the free skate, and explained: "There were few small troubles that kept stacking up ... However, if asked whether that was what led to the huge mistake (in the free skate), I don't think it was as big of a miss as it was in terms of the miss in the score." Hanyu's placement combined with Kagiyama's qualified three berths for Japanese men at the 2022 Winter Olympics. Hanyu competed as part of Team Japan for the 2021 World Team Trophy. He placed second in both the short program and the free skate, only behind Nathan Chen. He achieved a personal season's best score in both the short program and the free skate with 107.12 and 193.76 points respectively and earned a total of 22 points to help his team take home the bronze medal.

==== 2021–22 season: Sixth national title and third Olympics ====
Hanyu confirmed his plans to compete in the 2021–22 Olympic season, and was scheduled to compete at the 2021 NHK Trophy and 2021 Rostelecom Cup in November for the 2021–22 Grand Prix series. On November 4, 2021, the Japan Skating Federation announced Hanyu's withdrawal from the NHK Trophy due to an injury in his right ankle ligament during a fall in practice. The JSF subsequently announced his withdrawal from the Rostelecom Cup prior to the event, but said that he would remain in consideration for the Olympic team.

Hanyu made his season debut at the 2021–22 Japan Figure Skating Championships, placing first in both the short program and free skate, winning his sixth Japanese National title, tying Takeshi Honda's record of most national titles in the last 50 years. He also attempted a quadruple Axel for the first time during the free skate, although it was downgraded to a triple Axel with a two-footed landing. Hanyu was assigned to represent Japan at the 2022 Winter Olympics and the 2022 World Championships.

At the 2022 Winter Olympics, Hanyu missed his opening quadruple Salchow jump in the short program due to a hole in the ice and placed eighth with 95.15 points, qualifying him for the free skate. The score was his lowest in the segment since the 2019 World Championships. In the free skate, he fell twice in his first two opening jumps, a quadruple Axel and a quad Salchow. His quad Axel attempt is the first that was not downgraded to triple Axel. Other than these two mistakes, he delivered a clean skate, placing third in the free skate and fourth place overall with a total score of 283.21 points, behind fellow Japanese compatriot and bronze medalist Shoma Uno. Following his free skate, Hanyu confirmed in a press conference that he had re-injured his right ankle in practice the day before the free skate, but since it was the Olympics and not a normal competition, he chose to compete on painkillers instead of withdrawing. On March 1, 2022, the Japan Skating Federation announced Hanyu's withdrawal from the 2022 World Championships due to the unhealed injury.

== Professional skating career ==
At a press conference on July 19, 2022, Hanyu announced his decision to "step away" from competitive figure skating at amateur level and turn professional, stating that "he had achieved everything he could achieve" and would no longer "seek those kinds of evaluations." He also stated his intention to continue pursuing his "ideal skating" and dream of completing the quadruple Axel as a professional athlete. Nikkei Asia and International Figure Skating noted that Hanyu's exit from the competitive circuit "marks the end of an era". Juliet Macur of The New York Times remarked that "we may never see another skater like Yuzuru Hanyu". Numerous sports figures from and outside figure skating reacted to Hanyu's announcement with gratitude and praise, including Japanese gymnast Kōhei Uchimura, baseball player Shohei Ohtani, and tennis player Naomi Osaka.

=== Launch of social media and Share Practice ===
In August and September 2022, Hanyu opened accounts on social media, having eschewed it for years, that are mainly managed by staff. He stated his intention to show his skating through his YouTube channel and increase opportunities for everyone to watch it, including those who are unable to attend ice shows. On August 10, he live-streamed an open practice session on his channel titled Share Practice where he presented some of his past programs, including three run-throughs and a clean performance of his free skate Seimei with the same elements as used in his layout at the 2018 Winter Olympics. The session was open to the press, followed from the rinkside by numerous journalists and photographers, and was watched live on YouTube by more than 100,000 people, having exceeded a total of 3 million views in less than a month.

=== Yuzuru Hanyu Ice Story solo show series ===
In 2022, Hanyu presented his first ice show as a professional figure skater, titled Prologue, in Yokohama and Hachinohe. It was the first solo ice show production in figure skating, with each show having a duration of 90 minutes and featuring a selection of eight different programs performed at the athletic level of skating competitions, including multiple quadruple jumps and triple Axels. Prologue was a prelude event to the Yuzuru Hanyu Ice Story solo show series, produced and directed by himself in collaboration with choreographer Mikiko.

The first main chapter of the series was the solo show Gift, the first ice skating event to be held at Tokyo Dome, one of Japan's largest and most prestigious entertainment venues, with a new audience record for ice shows of 35,000 spectators. The show was presented on February 26, 2023, and featured 12 skating programs that were woven into a comprehensive, philosophical story of 120 minutes about Hanyu's life and future on ice. In his performances, he was accompanied by the dance group Elevenplay, the Tokyo Philharmonic Orchestra, and a special band led by Satoshi Takebe. The Olympics' official news site called Hanyu's programs "performances for the ages", noting that it was "more a concert for a blockbuster artist than an ice show." On July 14, Gift became the first ice show to be distributed on the streaming platform Disney+ worldwide.

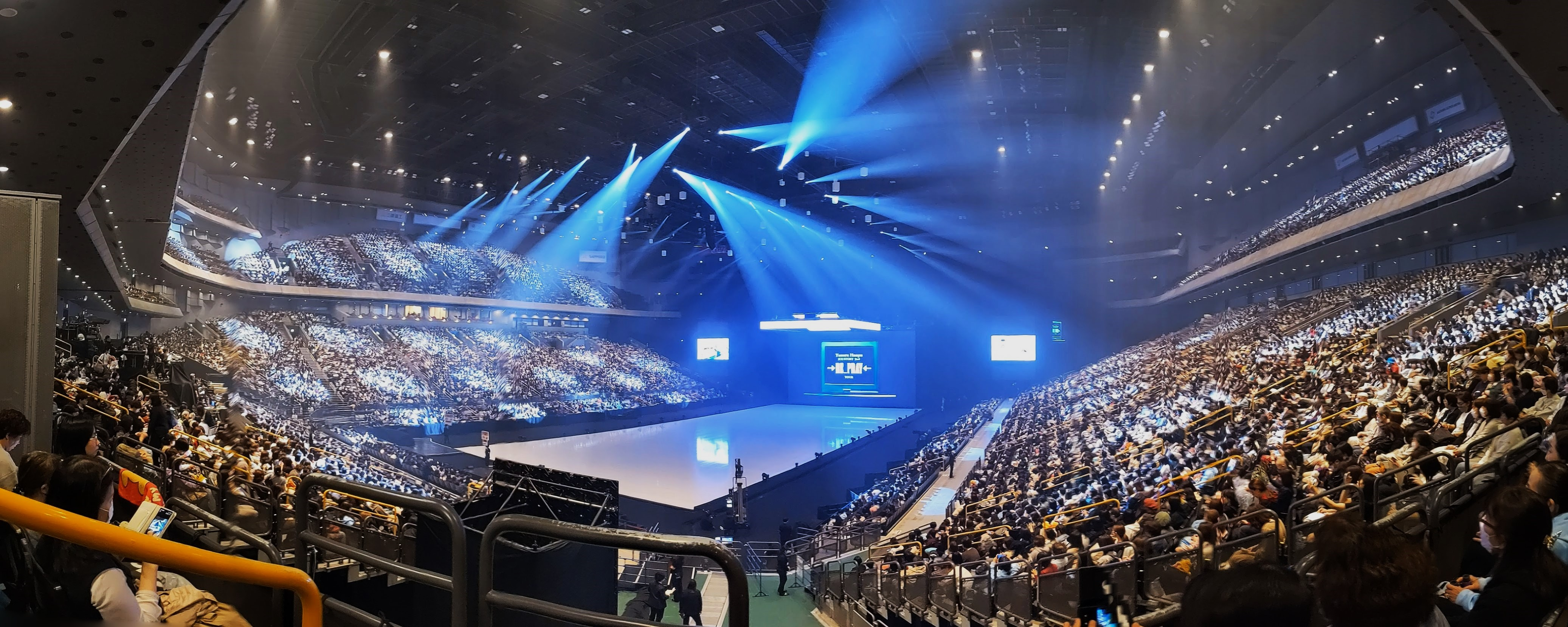
Crowd on the first day of Hanyu's Repray Tour at Saitama Super Arena in 2023 before the start of the show

The Repray Tour, a sequel to Gift and the second main chapter of Hanyu's Ice Story series, was the first solo ice show tour to be produced in figure skating, (Note: A show or concert tour usually consists of a minimum of three stops in three different cities or prefectures. For that reason, Hanyu's first solo show Prologue may not qualify as a "tour".) scheduled with four stops across Japan in Saitama, Saga, Yokohama, and Rifu from November 2023 to April 2024. Similar to Gift, each show had a duration of 120 minutes with 12 programs being merged into a gaming-themed story that picked up the contrasts between the virtual and real world, giving "food for thought about life and the series of choices we make." Hanyu's performances to soundtracks from popular video games like Final Fantasy or Undertale attracted many fans not only from figure skating but also the gaming scene. Due to high ticket demand, an additional performance in Rifu was added to the three initial tour stops.

On October 4, 2024, Hanyu announced the third installment of the series with the Echoes of Life Tour, which was held with three stops from December 2024 to February 2025. For Echoes of Life, Hanyu wrote the script in the form of a storybook that was released in advance in Japanese and English. The story came to life through a futuristic staging that included light effects and elaborated videos created with 3D computer graphics, which were combined with twelve figure skating programs performed by Hanyu and sometimes accompanied from the stage by the dance troupe Elevenplay. The theme of Echoes of Life centered around the philosophical question: “What does it mean to live?”

On January 11, 2026, the production of another solo show titled Realive was announced. The project was held in Sekisui Heim Super Arena on April 11–12, 2026. Realive is a one-off live performance that builds on the Ice Story series, bringing the programs that Hanyu has created up to now to life once again. This marked Hanyu's first solo production after the announcement of his maintenance period in August 2025. As in previous Ice Stories, Hanyu served as executive producer, with Mikiko serving as the director.

Particular to Hanyu's Ice Story show series is that the programs are part of a cohesive narrative. With Hanyu's Ice Story series, a new genre of performing art and entertainment has been created, weaving live skating performances with high-level technical elements into deep stories with elaborate on-screen narration. The series has attracted more than 200,000 spectators in total, with all 23 solo performances being sold out by lottery. The shows received universal acclaim in Japan and overseas, including figure skating world champions Patrick Chan and Elizaveta Tuktamysheva who praised Hanyu's remarkable athleticism and stamina, being able to skate up to 12 programs in one show. Japanese sportswriter Takaomi Matsubara named Hanyu's solo shows a new milestone in professional skating and, according to USC Annenberg columnist Valerie Fang, "we are witnessing the rise of a figure skating franchise."

=== Yuzuru Hanyu Notte Stellata and other charity shows ===
In March 2023, the annual ice show Yuzuru Hanyu Notte Stellata, a commemoration event of the 2011 Tōhoku earthquake and tsunami, was inaugurated at Sekisui Heim Super Arena in Rifu, which had served as a morgue at the time of the disaster. The show is produced by Nippon TV with Hanyu as the chairperson, featuring a cast of international professional skaters as well as a guest artist from a different sport or performing art field. The special guests of the first three editions were three-time Olympic gymnastics champion Kohei Uchimura, renowned stage actor Mao Daichi, and Japanese kyōgen actor Mansai Nomura. On December 11, 2025, a new installment of Notte Stellata was announced. The event was held on March 7–9, 2026, and the special guest was the Tohoku Youth Orchestra.

On September 15, 2024, Hanyu led a charity performance titled "Challenge" in Ishikawa Prefecture, accompanied by Satoko Miyahara, Akiko Suzuki, and Takahito Mura. The event was streamed live and on-demand via video streaming services, selling more than 10,000 tickets. The ¥53,662,728 ($367,758) proceeds from the event were donated to the Ishikawa Prefecture and Noto local government for the reconstruction of the areas affected by the 2024 Noto earthquake, which occurred on January 1, 2024.

== Skating technique and style ==
Hanyu's signature moves

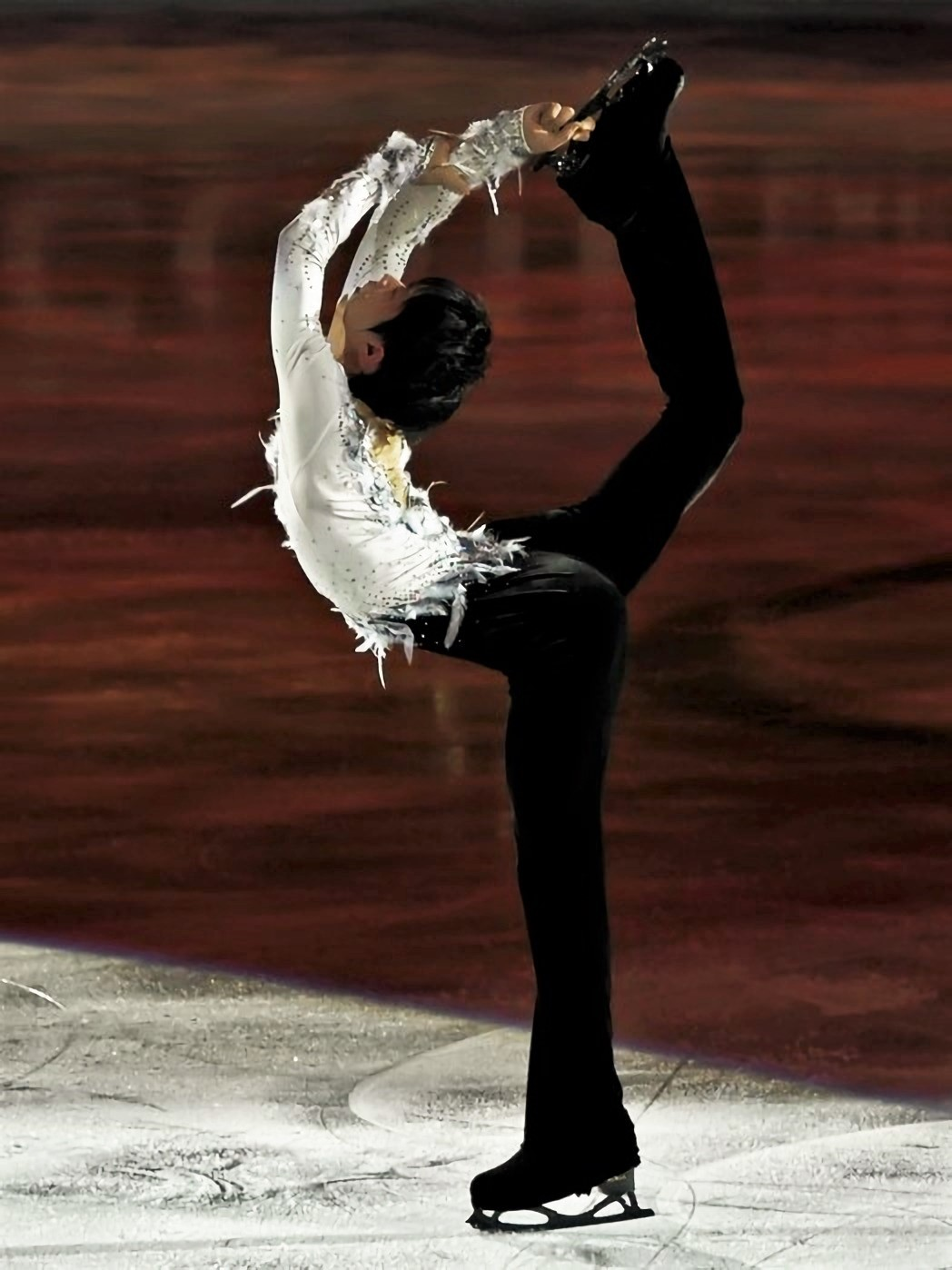
Layback Biellmann spin

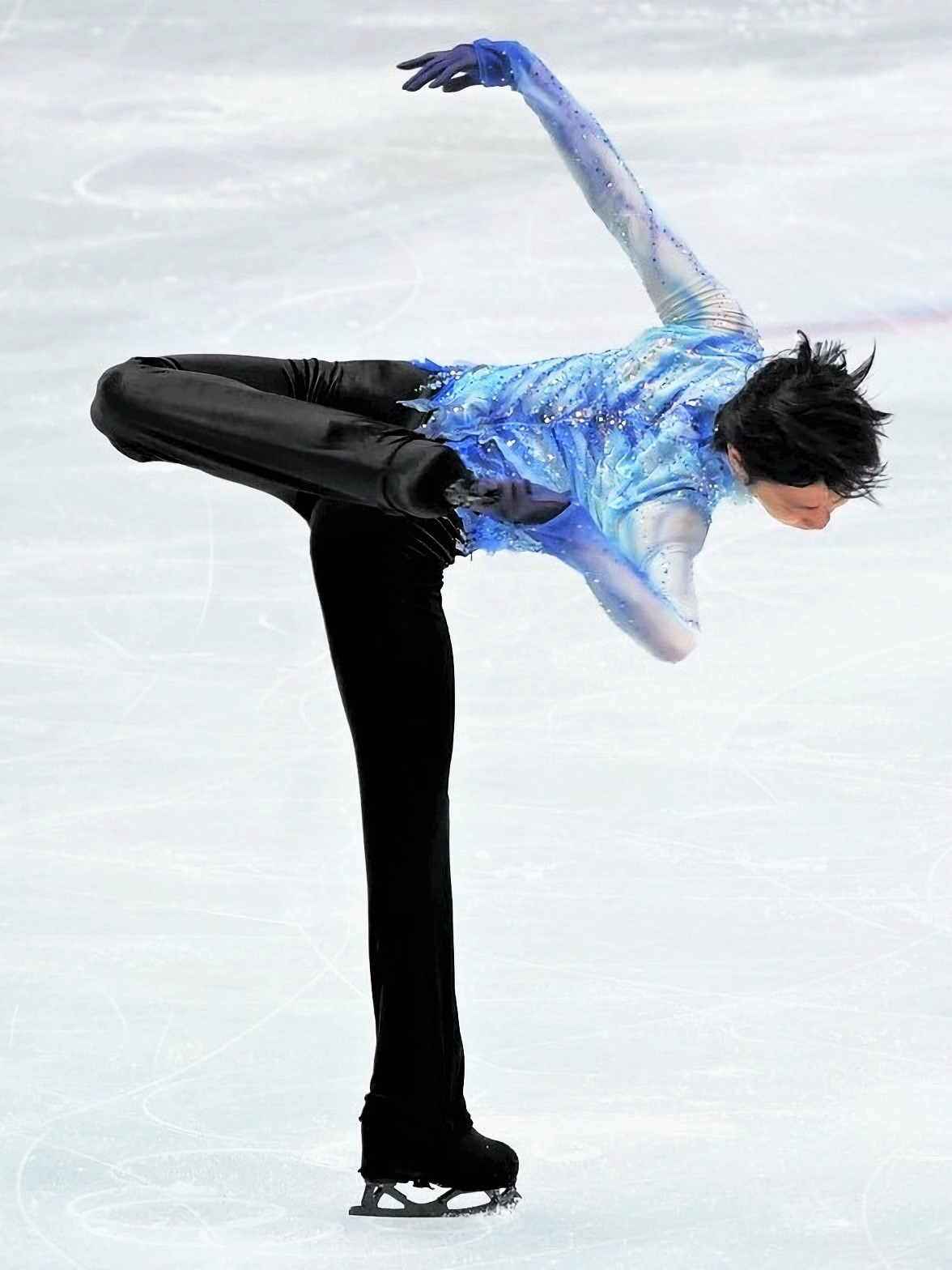
Doughnut camel spin

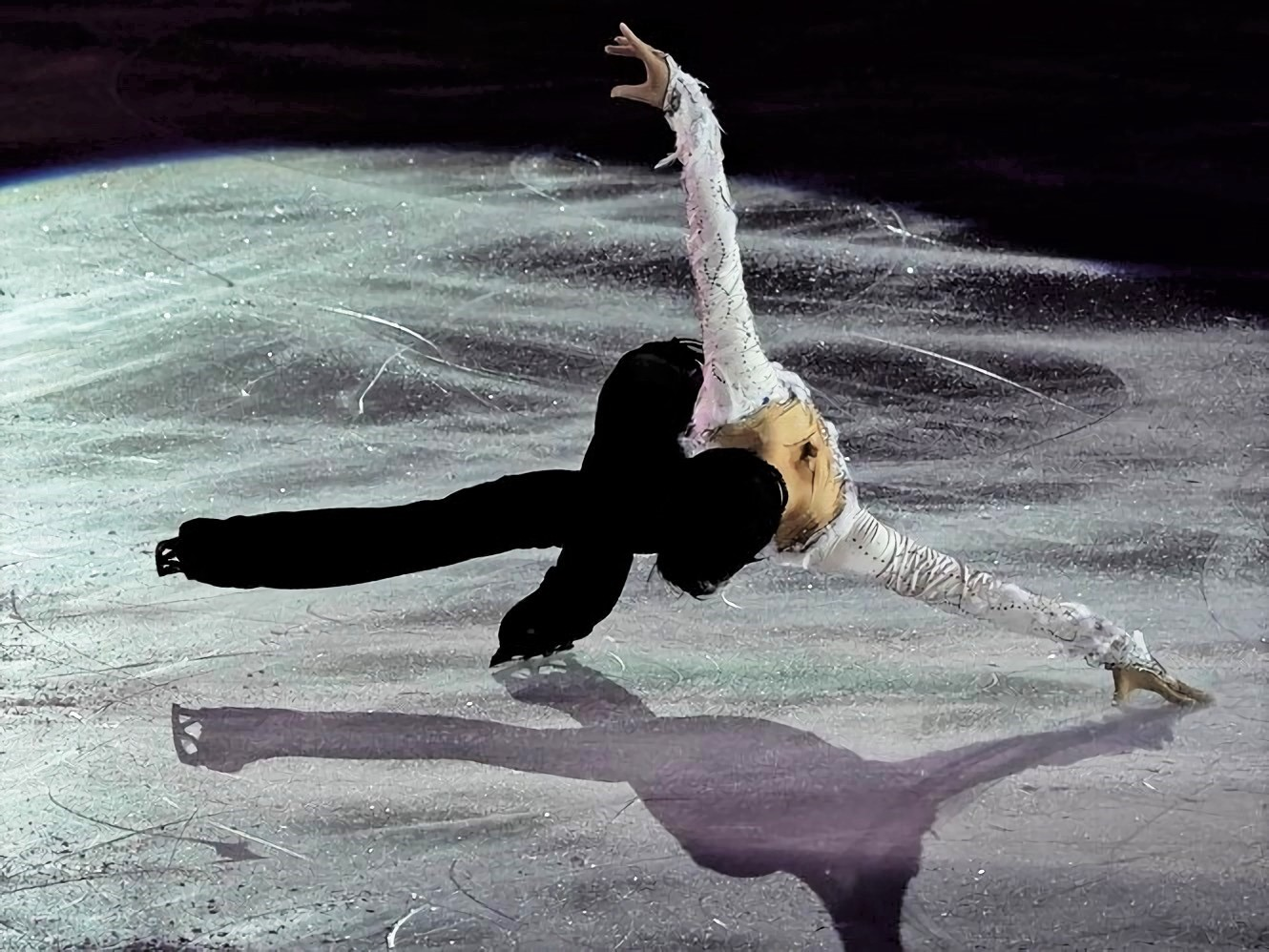
One-handed hydroblading

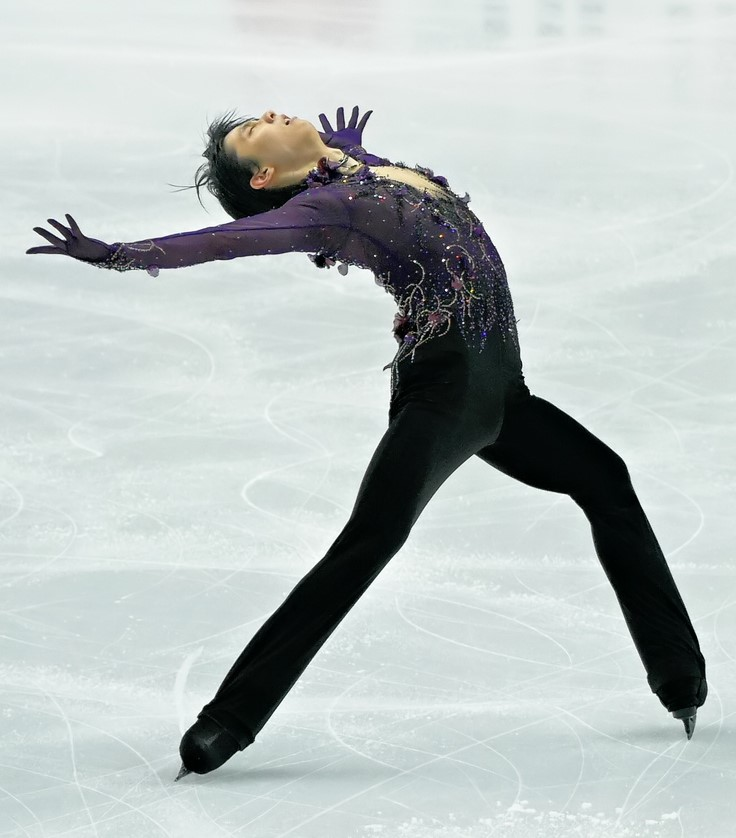
Layback Ina Bauer

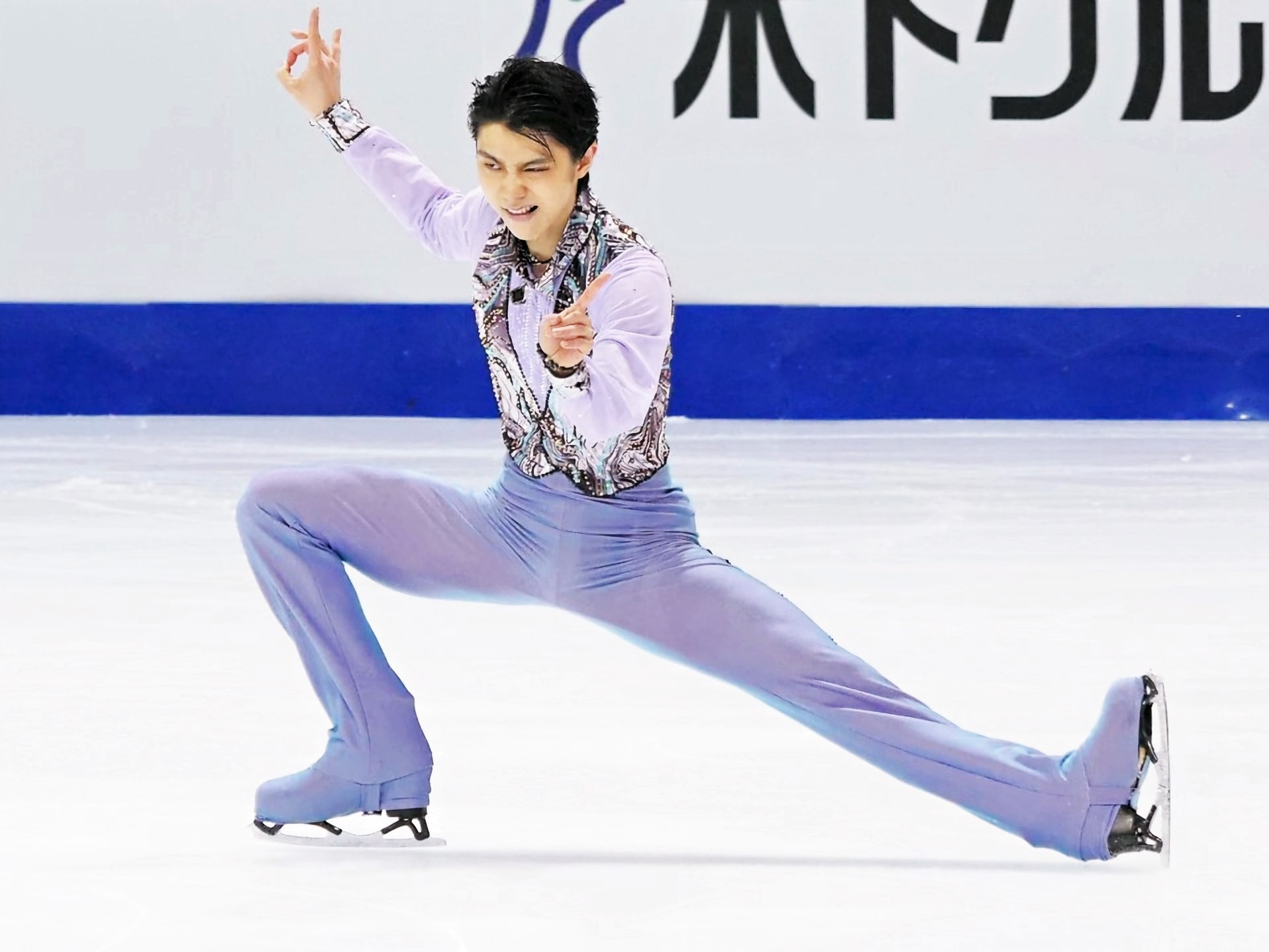
Side lunge (pistol pose)

Hanyu is regarded by analysts as an accomplished skater known for his high-level technical elements as well as mature and versatile artistry. His performance is often characterized as "the perfect combination of skills, strength and elegance", tending to "[blur] rigid gender lines". According to four-time Olympic medalist Evgeni Plushenko, Hanyu had a "decided edge over other skaters in the completeness of his performance—spins, skating skills, transitions between jumps and musical interpretation". Two-time world champion Stephane Lambiel described him as "the most complete athlete in figure skating, probably ever."

Hanyu is known for his ability to generate skating speed "out of nowhere" and cover long distances with only a few strokes. At the 2021–22 Japan Championships, he managed to perform a clean short program without using consecutive crossovers and reduce the number of basic skating movements to a minimum. This is a feat that has long been considered near impossible, as stated by former competitive skater John Misha Petkevich in his book Figure Skating: Championship Techniques from 1989: "Without a doubt, crossovers are the staple of every skater. Not only are they used to negotiate corners, but they are also used to pick up speed. Skating without crossovers would be virtually unthinkable."

The ability to accelerate with a few strokes allows Hanyu to execute his jumps from a variety of difficult entries. Notable are the backward counter turn, twizzle, and spread eagle into his signature triple Axel jump. Hanyu is also known for his strong vaulting technique with minimal pre-rotation on the ice at the take-off, (Note: Since the 2022–23 season, jumps with "excessive rotation on the ice at the take-off" are listed under "poor take-off" and result in a deduction of -1 to -3 in the raw GOE mark.) achieving trajectories of impressive size. With a height of 70 centimeters and covering a distance of 3.62 meters, his triple Axel was the largest measured jump in the men's short program at the 2019 World Championships. In 2018, Hanyu's triple Axel from the 2018 Winter Olympics was used as a demonstration example by the ISU for the GOE judging criteria "very good height and very good length" as well as "steps before the jump, unexpected or creative entry". Despite the complex preceding steps and big trajectory, he manages to land his jumps smoothly and increase his skating speed from take-off to landing. With the toe loop, Salchow, loop, and Lutz, Hanyu has successfully executed four different types of quadruple jumps in the course of his competitive career. He stated his preference for edge jumps, and notably featured all three types in his short program of the 2016–17 season.

Hanyu is able to execute the layback Biellmann and doughnut camel spin, which are more commonly seen in women's singles and known for their difficulty among male skaters due to the high flexibility required in spine, hips, and shoulders. Other signature moves include the layback Ina Bauer, hydroblading, and the side lunge. Overall, Hanyu's technical elements stand out for their high quality of execution, having received a total of 29 maximum scores in international competition, (Note: In the ISU Judging System, a technical element is awarded a perfect score if it is credited with the full base value by the technical panel and the maximum grade of execution (GOE) after dropping the highest and lowest mark across the judging panel (+3 GOE before and +5 GOE since the 2018–19 season).) covering all four types of required elements in the men's singles discipline: jumps, spins, steps, and choreographic sequences. Beyond that, his elements are noted for their seamless embedding into the choreography and his movements for their precise timing with the music, the latter being awarded a perfect 10.00 in the interpretation component at the 2021–22 Japan Championships.

Hanyu's programs cover a variety of different music genres, including classical pieces, modern pop rock, musicals, and traditional Japanese music. He notably portrayed the historical Japanese figures Abe no Seimei and Uesugi Kenshin in his free skate programs at the 2018 and 2022 Winter Olympics. He also dedicated various exhibition programs to the victims of the 2011 Tōhoku earthquake and tsunami and performed them as live music collaborations at shows like Fantasy on Ice among others. Hanyu is known to be involved in all aspects of his programs, from the music selection and editing process to the costume design and choreography. As his choreographer Shae-Lynn Bourne stated, "He knows what costume he wants. He knows what jump order he wants. He makes a lot of the decisions on his own. You can't say 'no' to that ever. You know, with music especially, because he is going to skate with conviction."

Figure skaters Hanyu looked up to while growing up are Evgeni Plushenko and Johnny Weir. With his competitive programs for the 2018–19 season, he paid homage to the two skaters by skating to "Otoñal" by Raúl Di Blasio as well as "Art on Ice" and "Magic Stradivarius" by Edvin Marton, which had been used by Weir and Plushenko, respectively, in their programs. At the press conference of the 2018 Winter Olympics, Hanyu also mentioned Stephane Lambiel, Javier Fernández, and Dick Button as the skaters who had influenced him as a skater.

== Public life ==
=== Endorsements and ambassadorships ===
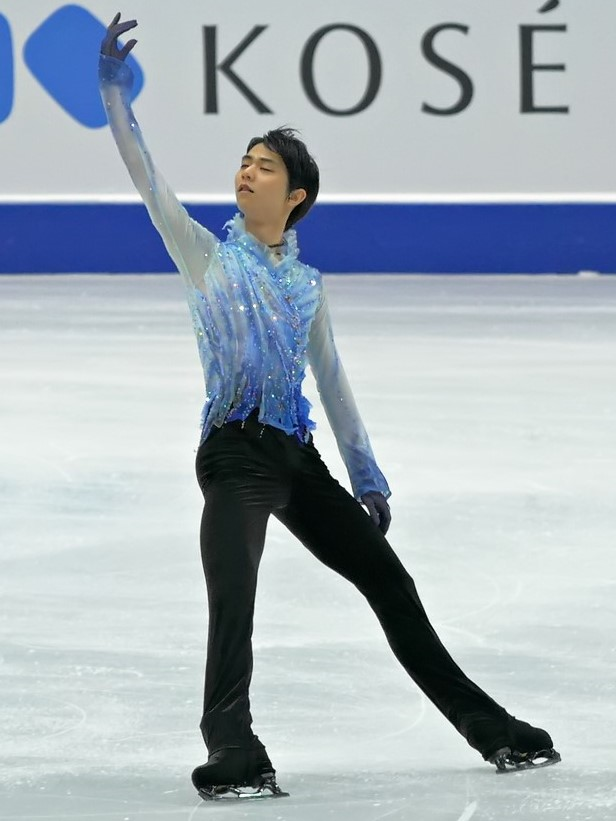
Hanyu pictured with his endorsing cosmetics brand Kosé at the 2019–20 Grand Prix Final

Hanyu has appeared in many commercials and advertising campaigns over the years. In 2013, Hanyu, alongside fellow Japanese figure skater Daisuke Takahashi, became the 2014 Sochi Winter Olympics campaign ambassador for P&G's global "Proud Sponsor of Moms" campaign. He also signed an affiliation contract with All Nippon Airways which ended when he turned professional in 2022 but he remained sponsored by the company till September 2023. From February 8 to 23, 2014, Hanyu endorsed ANA's new line of flight attendant outfits, which were designed by Prabal Gurung and appeared in a TV commercial for their 2018 Pyeongchang Winter Olympics "Hello Blue Hello Future" campaign. In September 2014, Hanyu starred in a TV commercial for Capcom's new video game Monster Hunter 4G and endorsed Lotte's Ghana milk chocolate with Mao Asada, singer Airi Matsui, and actresses Suzu Hirose and Tao Tsuchiya, in following years he also endorsed Lotte's Xylitol Whites and GUM FOR THE GAME.

Hanyu has also worked with other brands such as Ajinomoto endorsing their sport nutritional products Amino Vital and nutritional meals along with other athletes like Uta Abe, bath salts Bathclin Kikiyu, bedding products Nishikawa Sangyo co., and Phiten for their Aqua-Titanium sports socks and line of Rakuwa nylon-coated necklaces and bracelets including Hanyu's inspired 'Wings Gold' models. In 2019, Hanyu became the ambassador for Citizen in China, Hong Kong, and Macau, as well as the global ambassador of the Sekkisei series by Kosé. He was later appointed as the global "muse" of the Sekkisei Miyabi brand in 2020. In October 2021, Hanyu was chosen as a face of Towa Pharmaceutical co. appearing in a TV commercial with veteran actress Tetsuko Kuroyanagi and endorsed ANA's new teleportation services "avatarin".

In 2013 and 2021, Hanyu was appointed as the model for Miyagi Prefecture Police's traffic safety poster aiming to encourage compliance with traffic rules and spread awareness of safe driving. According to an official in March 2021, Hanyu was chosen because "he embodies sportsmanship". In June 2021, Hanyu was appointed as the ambassador of the world's first official Paralympics game The Pegasus Dream Tour, making his video game debut with his avatar appearing in the game. According to the representative of the game's developer company, Hanyu was chosen because "he is an athlete as well as a person who has artistry in his way of life". Since April 2014, Hanyu has been acting as the tourism ambassador of Sendai and featured in the city's tourism posters as well as tourist guidebooks. On March 14, 2024, he was announced as a new brand ambassador for the Italian luxury fashion house Gucci, joining Italian tennis player Jannik Sinner, Chinese actor and singer Xiao Zhan, British soccer player Jack Grealish, and American rapper and hip-hop dancer Jay Park among others. On November 21, 2024, he was announced as the brand ambassador for Chinese multinational home appliances and consumer electronics company Haier in Japan for their brands Haier and Aqua.

=== Philanthropy ===
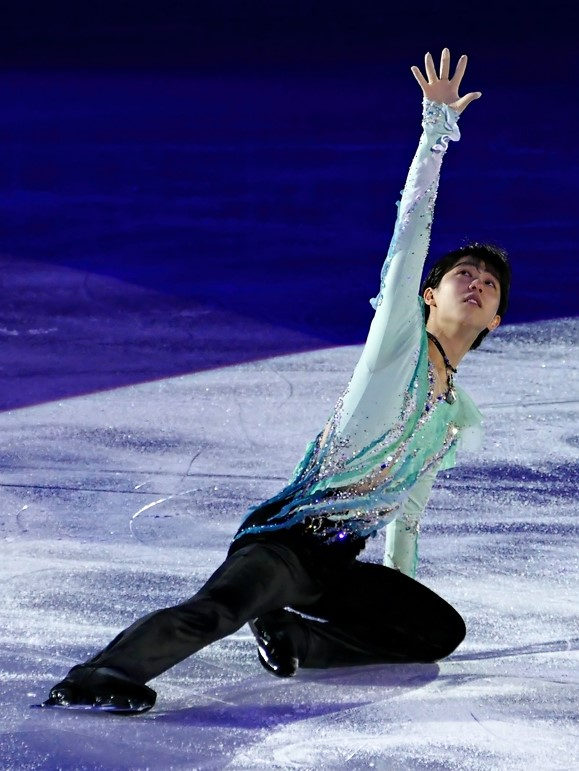
Hanyu in "Requiem of Heaven and Earth", a tribute to the victims of 3.11

Since the 2011 Tōhoku earthquake and tsunami, Hanyu has been an advocate for and supporter of various campaigns to help earthquake victims, as he was also directly affected by the disaster, stating: "When the earthquake hit, I was on the ice at my home rink in Sendai". Shortly after the disaster, he and other skaters skated in ice shows to raise money for the victims, raising a total of more than US$150,000. He also sold his personal belongings at the show, raising an additional ¥2,954,323 ($35,387). Since the disaster, Hanyu has been lending his image to the Great East Japan Earthquake Employment, Education and Health Support Organization to use for posters encouraging donations for the disaster area.

Hanyu donated his 2014 Olympic gold medal ¥6 million ($55,000) prize money as well as his 2018 Olympic gold medal ¥10 million ($92,000) prize money received from the Japan Skating Federation and Japanese Olympic Committee to Sendai and Miyagi Prefecture to help with the reconstruction of the disaster areas. Additionally, he donated all the royalties and part of the proceeds of his autobiography series to Ice Rink Sendai, which was rendered unusable after the earthquake. It was revealed in 2026 that a total of ¥109,971,996 ($741,230) had been donated to the rink.

In September 2014, Hanyu was appointed as the Tsunami Disaster Prevention Ambassador for one year, in which he participated in activities to spread public awareness of tsunami disaster prevention. In February 2015, Hanyu became the spokesman for reconstruction efforts led by the Japanese Red Cross Society. He also lent his image as the spokesman for the Red Cross' "Hatachi no Kenketsu" donation campaign where he starred in the promotional video with patients. In April 2016, upon his request to his sponsor Phiten, drinking water was donated to the areas affected by the 2016 Kumamoto earthquakes. In March 2019, he donated a pair of figure skates to an online charity auction which raised 7.12 million yen ($64,000) for the disaster area reconstruction. He also collaborated with Line Corporation supervising the creation of "Yuzuru Hanyu 3.11 Smile Stamp". All revenue from the stamp was donated to the Nippon Foundation's "Special Fund for Disaster Reconstruction" to support reconstruction and future disaster preparation. On August 21, 2019, Hanyu appeared in a series of posters alongside the protagonist of the anime Yowamushi Pedal to promote Tour de Tohoku, an annual charity cycling event. To mark the 10th anniversary of Tohoku earthquake and tsunami in 2021, Hanyu organized the "Together, Forward" exhibition, which revisited the affected people and places of the disaster. The exhibition was held in multiple Japanese cities to remind everyone of the importance of disaster prevention and preparation.

In cooperation with Yomiuri Shimbun, a free entry exhibition of Hanyu's photos, costumes, and medals was held in multiple locations in Japan in 2018 and 2022 and online in 2020. A total sum of more than 150 million yen was donated from the sales of the exhibition's merchandise. Around 42 million yen was donated in 2018 to support victims of the Great East Japan Earthquake and other disasters, and around 27 million yen was donated in 2020 to the National Corona Medical Welfare Support Fund. The donation from the 2022 exhibition that exceeded 85 million yen was donated to the Yomiuri Light and Love Foundation which was used to create a disaster relief fund in preparation for any future large-scale disaster that occurs in Japan. In February 2023, it was announced that 10 million yen from the fund would be donated for relief and reconstruction efforts in areas affected by the 2023 Turkey–Syria earthquake in Turkey. In January 2024, it was announced that 10 million yen from the fund would be donated to the Ishikawa Prefecture which was severely impacted by the 2024 Noto Peninsula earthquake. In July 2024, it was announced that a total of 2 million yen from a portion of the sales from Costume Kewpie® dolls dressed in Hanyu's costumes, plus a donation from Hanyu himself, would be sent to Ishikawa Prefecture to help with the reconstruction of the disaster-stricken areas through the Yomiuri Light and Love Foundation. In July 2026, it was announced that a total of ¥1,543,680 from a portion of the sales for Tamamushi-nuri Compact Mirror inspired by Hanyu's Costume, would be donated to the Yomiuri Light and Love Foundation and at the end of the same month it was announced that the foundation donated 10 million yen to Kumamoto Prefecture after the 2026 Kumamoto earthquake to support victims and aid in reconstruction efforts.

From 2014 to 2022, Hanyu regularly participated in Nippon TV's annual charity program 24-Hour Television, holding special ice shows and visiting victims in disaster areas. In 2014, he held a one-night ice show to bring in donations. In 2015, he and Hey! Say! JUMP member Yuri Chinen designed "Chari-T-shirts" for the program under the slogan "To connect: a smile beyond time". Profits from the t-shirt sales were donated to charity. He also visited earthquake-affected areas in Fukushima and Ishinomaki, interviewing the victims as part of the program segment.

In December 2022, Hanyu was appointed as a special messenger for NTV's program news every. presenting a new segment called "Yuzuru Hanyu, Thoughts I want to convey" every few months to promote awareness about natural disaster areas and disaster prevention. Since 2011, Hanyu has donated a cumulative total of more than $3 million for reconstruction, disaster prevention, and other humanitarian efforts.

On February 1, 2025, the "Ishikawa Prefecture Support Project" was launched, featuring Hanyu in life-size panels and posters installed at tourist facilities throughout Ishikawa Prefecture. The project, which will run until March 31, 2027, aims to encourage people to travel around the Prefecture and develop an interest in Noto to help the region's recovery after the 2024 Noto earthquake.

On January 24, 2026, it was revealed that Hanyu had donated ¥54,205,800 to local skating rink, "Bell Sunpia Miyagi Izumi", in Miyagi prefecture. The information had been shared three days before by a fan who posted a photo of a notice board at the facility on X. The donation supported renovation work carried out between June and September, 2025 which included installation of six dehumidifiers and eight air blowers, application of anti-condensation paint to the steel framework, and the replacement of the battery of Zamboni used to maintain the ice surface after Hanyu had expressed concern about the condition of the ice rink due to condensation problems, which could cause that children skating there might fall and get injured.

=== Film and television ===
Hanyu served as a judge on Japan's popular New Year's Eve music show Kōhaku Uta Gassen twice, in 2015 and 2022. He made his on-screen debut as Date Shigemura, a samurai lord, in the 2016 movie, The Magnificent Nine. In May 2023, Hanyu guested on a special episode celebrating the 48th-anniversary of the world's longest-running single-host talk show, Tetsuko's Room. Hanyu was one of the athletes featured in the 2022 Winter Olympics official documentary film Beijing 2022 released in May 2023. On March 5, 2025, Hanyu collaborated with Japanese singer Kenshi Yonezu to perform a figure skating program for the music video of the latter's song Bow and Arrow, which was used as the opening theme of the anime Medalist. The two versions of the music video of Bow and Arrow (the standard version and the Yuzuru Hanyu Short Program version) were included in the "installer device version" of the Plazma/Bow and Arrow single, which was released in June 2025.

Hanyu released two video albums compiling some of his competitive career performances, the first titled Time of Awakening was released on May 21, 2014, including performances till the 2014 Winter Olympics. Time of Awakening became the first album from an athlete to top Oricon's DVD weekly chart since its establishment in 1999 and peaked at number 3 on the Blu-ray weekly chart after selling 44,000 copies in its first week. The second album titled Time of Evolution was released on September 15, 2019, including performances from the 2015–16 season to the 2018 winter Olympics. Time of Evolution became the first sports-related work to top Oricon's Blu-ray weekly chart and peaked at number 2 on the DVD weekly chart after selling over 38,000 copies in its first week.

On December 18, 2015, NHK Enterprises released the DVD of The Flowers Bloom on Ice, featuring behind-the-scenes and interviews with Shizuka Arakawa and Yuzuru Hanyu as they skate at the ice show together to support reconstruction after the 2011 Japan earthquake.

In 2018, Hanyu's first self-produced show Continues with Wings was live broadcast on CS TV Asahi and live-streamed at 66 movie theaters throughout Japan. He is also one of the lead cast members besides Stéphane Lambiel and Johnny Weir at the annual touring ice show Fantasy on Ice, having participated in all editions of the tour since its revival in 2010 with one exception, having missed the shows in 2016 due to rehabilitation from a ligament injury.

=== Books and magazines ===
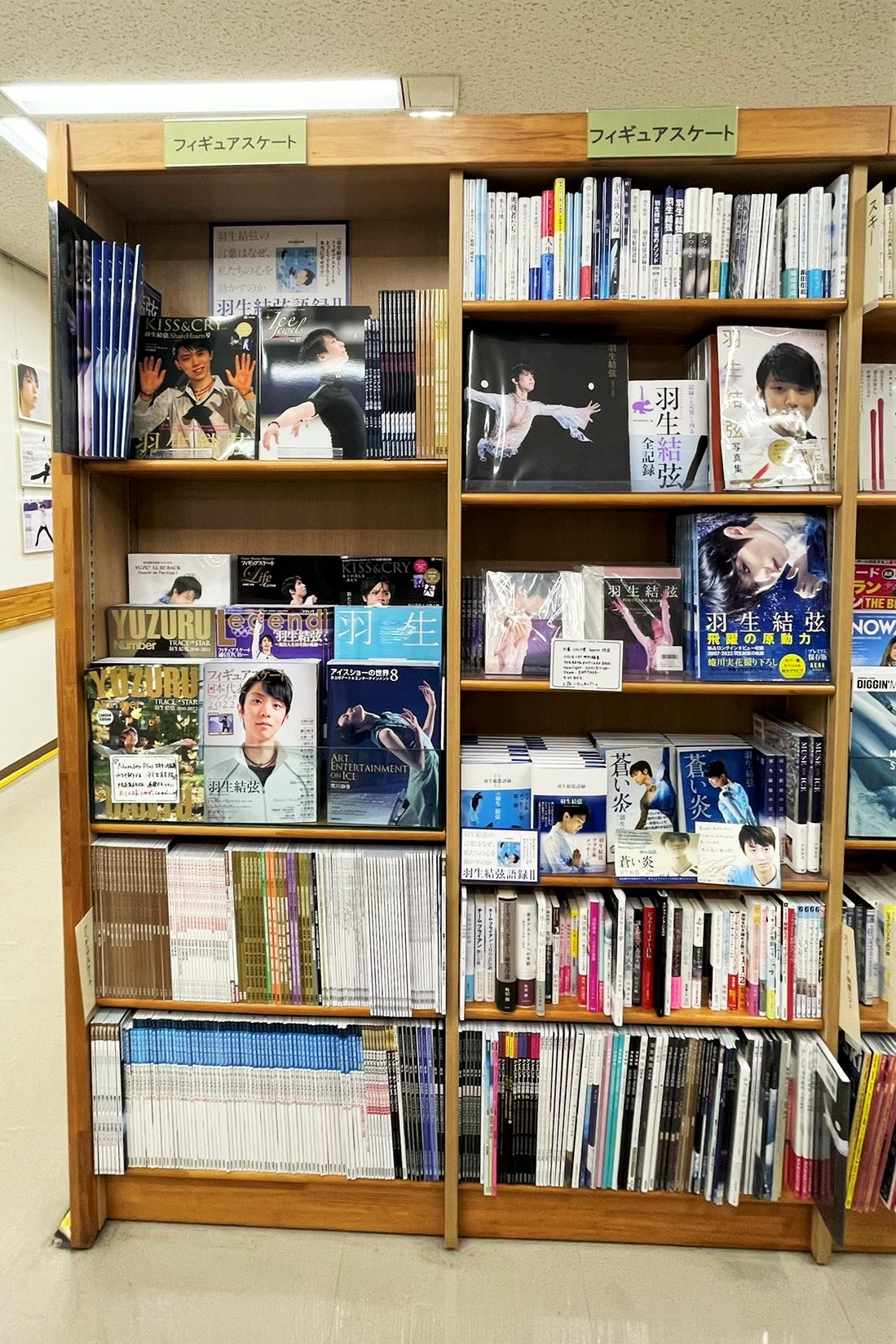
Print media with Hanyu on the cover at the Junkudo bookshop in Ikebukuro, Tokyo

Hanyu released the first two parts of his autobiography series Blue Flames and Blue Flames II in 2012 and 2016, respectively. In 2023, the third part Blue Flames III and the fourth and final part of the series Blue Flames IV were released. As of 2023, the series has sold over 400,000 copies.

Hanyu released various photobooks, cooperating with multiple publishers and photographers. His first photo book, Yuzuru, was released on October 4, 2014, selling over 23,000 copies in the first week. It ranked first in Oricon's weekly charts for photos and sport-related categories, as well as second in the chart's general books category.

On September 25, 2015, Yuzuru Hanyu Sayings was released, containing pictures and quotes by the skater. The book topped Amazon's reservation sales rankings. On October 2, 2022, a second part of the book was released. On March 1, 2018, the book Live Your Dream including a collection of interviews with Hanyu from 2015 to 2018, was released. The book sold 28,000 copies, ranking third in Oricon's weekly general books chart. On October 11, 2018, Yuzuru Hanyu Soul Program was released. The book includes photos and descriptions of programs performed by Hanyu. In November 2022, Yuzuru Hanyu Amateur Era Complete Record was released. The book looks back on Hanyu's competitive skating life, including press photos and competition results.

Hanyu has graced the cover of numerous sports magazines, including the 100th edition of World Figure Skating, Japan's oldest figure skating magazine. He also appeared on the covers of famous fashion and lifestyle magazines, such as Elle Japan, GQ Japan, Aera, An An, Brutus, Harper's Bazaar Japan, and T Japan. AERA's special issue about Hanyu, titled The driving force behind the leap, sold over 29,000 copies in the first week, topping Oricon's weekly general books chart in October 2022. In August 2024, he also became the first person to be featured on the cover of two consecutive editions of the AERA magazine. In February 2026, Hanyu became the athlete with the most number of appearances on the cover of An An.

== Accolades and impact ==
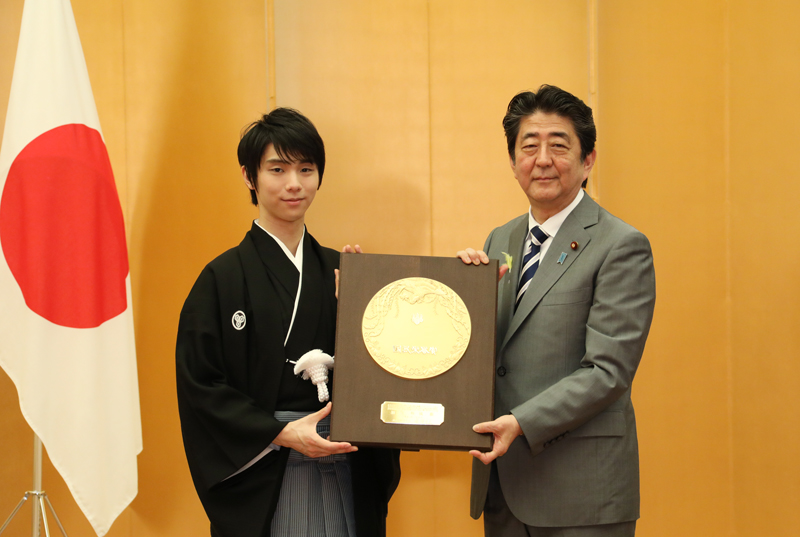
Hanyu receiving the People's Honor Award from then Japanese prime minister Shinzo Abe in 2018

Many sport writers, commentators, and skaters have made the case for Hanyu as the greatest skater in history, particularly after his second Olympic victory, for his well-rounded skills, longevity at the top in a highly competitive field, and ability to deliver under pressure. His decision to attempt the quadruple Axel at the 2022 Winter Olympics instead of taking a conservative option was seen to have strengthened his status.

Hanyu is regarded as part of the vanguard of the quad revolution in men's figure skating. He was one of the few skaters who challenged quadruple Salchow at the 2014 Olympics. He is credited as the first figure skater to successfully land a quadruple loop in competition after performing it in the short program at the Autumn Classic International in Montreal, Canada on September 30, 2016. He is also the only skater who has landed a quadruple toe loop-triple Axel sequence in competition, doing so for the first time at Grand Prix Helsinki 2018. Hanyu is also the first skater to land a quadruple toe loop-Euler-triple flip combination at Skate Canada 2019. At the 2022 Winter Olympics, Hanyu made his first attempt on the quadruple Axel in an international competition. Despite falling on the jump, he received the base value of quad Axel before being reduced for under-rotation. It was the closest quad Axel attempt in a competition until American Ilia Malinin successfully landed one at the 2022 CS U.S. Classic, who cited Hanyu as his inspiration to attempt the jump. However, in regard to the ongoing debate on jumps versus artistry in the sport, Hanyu spoke through an interpreter after his second Olympic win in 2018:

"I believe [...] that this artistry is very much based on having the correct technique and a strong foundation at the core of everything. It is upon these that the artistry is built, and without that strong foundation and that basis in technique, it is not possible to have that full artistry required as well. [...] Of course there are some other figure skaters who perhaps place a much higher priority on the jumps themselves and they are also successful in winning in competitions through this as well. However, personally I believe that within these different difficult jumps these are used as the basis for the artistry, and this relationship is balanced, which comes together to form what is most important."

In recognition of his achievements, Hanyu has been awarded numerous accolades, including the People's Honor Award in 2018 becoming the first figure skater and the youngest recipient of the award. He was also awarded the Medal of Honour with Purple Ribbon in 2014 and 2018, and received two monuments depicting his trademark poses performed at the 2014 and 2018 Olympics in his hometown of Sendai. He was also nominated for the Laureus World Sports Award for Comeback of the Year in 2019 becoming the first figure skater to be nominated for the award, and was awarded the Most Valuable Skater of the 2019–20 season at the inaugural ISU Skating Awards in 2020. In 2021, he was awarded the Azusa Ono Memorial Award, the most prestigious award that can be conferred to students and given to those recognized as a model, from Waseda University. On October 11, 2022, he was announced as a recipient of the Kikuchi Kan Prize for his accomplishments as a competitive figure skater as well as his attitude of "continuing to take on challenges".

In 2022, Hanyu placed sixth in the list of most-searched athletes on Google Search worldwide, behind Novak Djokovic, Rafael Nadal, Serena Williams (all tennis), Manti Te'o (American football), and Shaun White (snowboard). He was also featured in prestigious lists, such as Forbes' 30 Under 30 Asia 2018 as well as ESPN's World Fame 100 and The Dominant 20, received multiple awards and ranked high in various lists and popularity polls by media outlets. In 2024, Hanyu was featured in ESPN's top 25 selection of the greatest Olympic athletes of the 21st century, being the highest-ranked figure skater in the list (10th place) ahead of three-time Olympic ice dance champions Tessa Virtue and Scott Moir (11th place). He was also featured in the 10 10 list of most impactful and representative male athletes of the last century, published by the International Sports Press Association (AIPS). The rankings were based on an online vote by 913 established international sports journalists from 137 countries, with the results being presented at the AIPS' 100-year anniversary ceremony at the UNESCO headquarters in Paris during the 2024 Summer Olympics. Hanyu ranked 6th behind Muhammad Ali (boxing), Usain Bolt (athletics), Michael Jordan (basketball), Pelé (soccer), and Roger Federer (tennis).

== Personal life and education ==
Since Hanyu began carrying a Winnie-the-Pooh tissue box to competitions in 2010, his supporters and fans eventually made it a custom to acknowledge the end of his performances by throwing Pooh bears onto the ice instead of other kinds of stuffed toys or gifts, which has been a tradition in figure skating. Hanyu donates the bears to disadvantaged children at local hospitals and charities surrounding the arena that hosted the event.

Hanyu studied at Nanakita Elementary and Junior High School. In 2013, Hanyu graduated from Tohoku High School then entered an e-school program on Human Information Science at Waseda University. He attended from his training base in Canada. In August 2020, it was revealed that his graduation thesis summarizes how 3D motion capture technology could be used in figure skating, and in particular its potential for use in figure skating judging. One area of research he did is recording and analyzing his movement while doing the triple Axel jump off-ice which he hopes can be used to improve the skills of athletes and A.I. judging. He officially graduated from the university in September 2020, but was unable to attend the ceremony due to the COVID-19 pandemic in Japan. In March 2021, a bulletin paper summarizing his graduation thesis was published in the Waseda Journal of Human Sciences.

On August 4, 2023, Hanyu announced his marriage to an unnamed spouse through his official social network account. On November 17, 2023, he announced he and his spouse had divorced, citing harassment by the press as cause for the separation.

== World records and other achievements ==
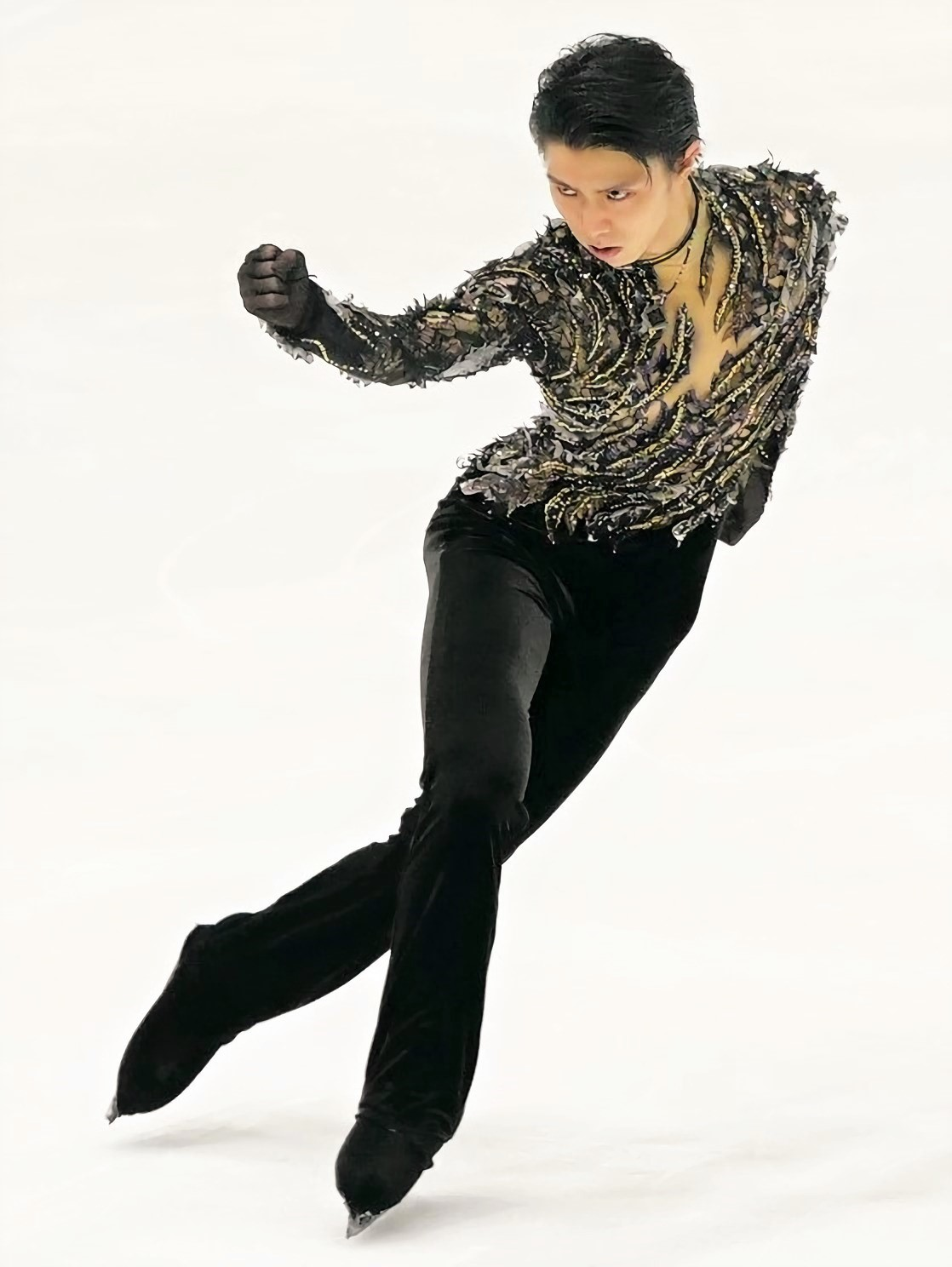
Hanyu at the 2018 Grand Prix of Helsinki, where he reset the world record scores in all competition segments

Throughout his career, Hanyu has broken world records nineteen times – seven times under the current +5/-5 GOE System and twelve times in the former +3/-3 GOE System. He holds the historical world record in all three competition segments: the short program, free skating, and combined total score.

- The table only lists Hanyu's world records in the +5/-5 GOE System.

Chronological list of world record scores in the +5/-5 GOE System
Date	Score	Segment	Event
Nov 3, 2018	106.69	Short program	2018 Grand Prix of Helsinki
Nov 4, 2018	190.43	Free skating	2018 Grand Prix of Helsinki
Nov 4, 2018	297.12	Combined total	2018 Grand Prix of Helsinki
Nov 16, 2018	110.53	Short program	2018 Rostelecom Cup
Mar 23, 2019	206.10	Free skating	2019 World Championships
Mar 23, 2019	300.97	Combined total	2019 World Championships
Feb 7, 2020	111.82	Short program	2020 Four Continents Championships

== Programs and ice show productions ==
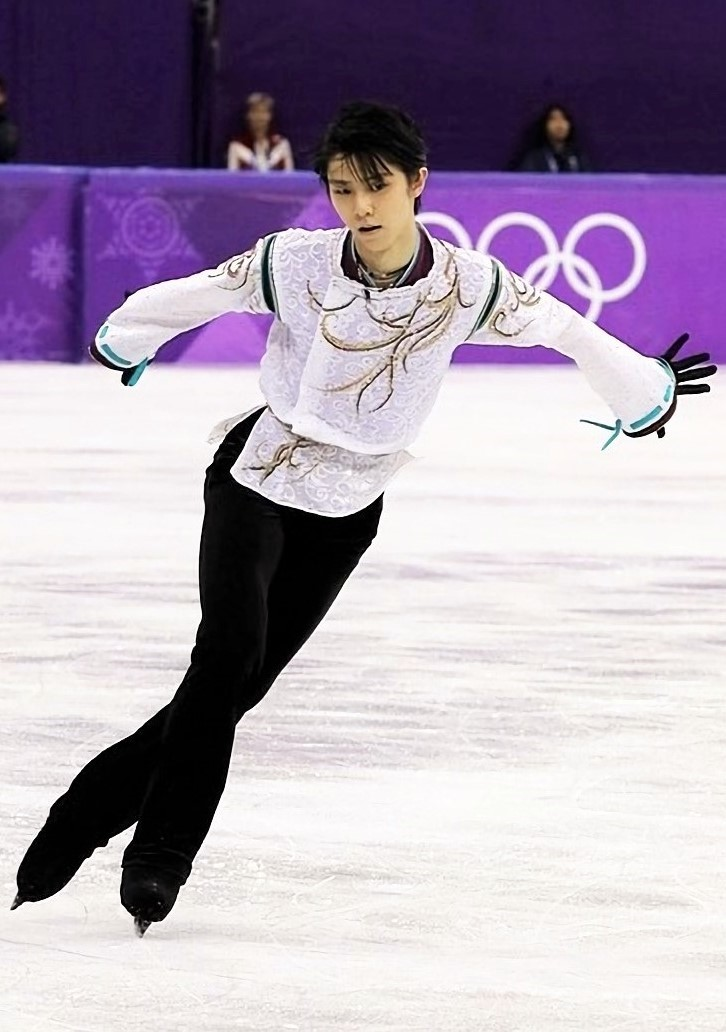
Hanyu performing his free skate program Seimei at the 2018 Winter Olympics

- Programs performed at the Winter Olympics highlighted in bold and blue

Shortlist of senior competition programs by season
Season	Short program	Free skate program
2010–11	"White Legend"	Zigeunerweisen
2011–12	Étude in D-sharp minor	Romeo + Juliet
2012–13	"Parisienne Walkways"	Notre-Dame de Paris
2013–14	"**Parisienne Walkways**" (Background and making)	**Romeo and Juliet** (Background and making)
2014–15	Ballade No. 1 in G minor	The Phantom of the Opera
2015–16	Ballade No. 1 in G minor	Seimei
2016–17	"Let's Go Crazy"	Hope and Legacy
2017–18	**Ballade No. 1 in G minor** (Background and making)	**Seimei** (Background and making)
2018–19	"Otoñal"	Origin
2019–20	"Otoñal"	Origin
2019–20	Ballade No. 1 in G minor	Seimei
2020–21	"Let Me Entertain You"	Heaven and Earth (天と地と)
2021–22	**Introduction and Rondo Capriccioso** (Background and making)	**Heaven and Earth** (天と地と) (Background and making)

Solo ice shows

- Prologue (2022)
- Gift (2023)
- Repray Tour (2023–24)
- Echoes of Life Tour (2024–25)
- Realive (2026)

Ensemble ice shows

- Fantasy on Ice (2010–2024, lead cast member)
- Continues with Wings (2018, chairperson)
- Yuzuru Hanyu Notte Stellata (2023–present, chairperson)
- Noto Peninsula Reconstruction Support Charity Performance (2024, lead cast member)
- The First Skate (2025, lead cast member)

== Competitive highlights ==
- GP – Event of the ISU Grand Prix Series
- CS – Event of the ISU Challenger Series
- C – Cancelled event, WD – Withdrawal
- Medals at team events are awarded for the team result only. The individual placement at the ISU World Team Trophy is listed in parentheses.

Competition placements since the 2010–11 season
Season	2010–11	2011–12	2012–13	2013–14	2014–15	2015–16	2016–17	2017–18	2018–19	2019–20	2020–21	2021–22
Winter Olympics				1st				1st				4th
Winter Olympics (Team)				5th								
World Championships		3rd	4th	1st	2nd	2nd	1st	WD	2nd	C	3rd	WD
Four Continents	2nd		2nd				2nd			1st	C	
Grand Prix Final		4th	2nd	1st	1st	1st	1st		WD	2nd		
GP Cup of China		4th			2nd							
GP Finland									1st			
GP France				2nd								
GP NHK Trophy	4th		1st		4th	1st	1st	WD		1st		WD
GP Rostelecom Cup	7th	1st						2nd	1st			WD
GP Skate America			2nd									
GP Skate Canada				2nd		2nd	2nd			1st		
CS Autumn Classic						1st	1st	2nd	1st	1st		
Finlandia Trophy			1st	1st	WD							
Nebelhorn Trophy		1st										
Japan Championships	4th	3rd	1st	1st	1st	1st	WD	WD	WD	2nd	1st	1st
World Team Trophy		WD	WD		3rd (1st)		1st (3rd)		WD		3rd (2nd)	

- JGP – Event of the ISU Junior Grand Prix Series

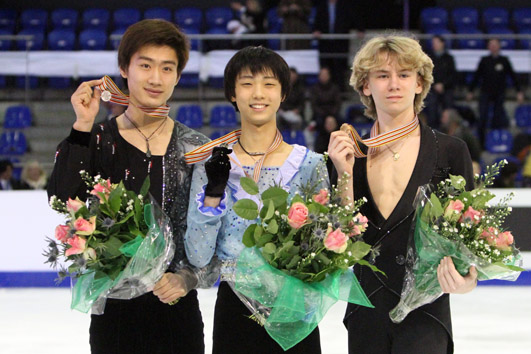
Hanyu with Song Nan (left) and Artur Gachinski (right) at the 2010 World Junior Championships podium

Competition placements until the 2009–10 season
Season	2004–05	2005–06	2006–07	2007–08	2008–09	2009–10
Junior Worlds					12th	1st
JGP Final						1st
JGP Italy					5th	
JGP Croatia						1st
JGP Poland						1st
Santa Claus Cup	1st					
Mladost Trophy			1st			
Skate Copenhagen				1st		
Japan Senior					8th	6th
Japan Junior			7th	3rd	1st	1st

== See also ==
- List of Olympic medalists in figure skating
- List of highest historical scores in figure skating
- Grand Slam (figure skating)

== Notes and references ==
=== Books and magazines cited ===
- Hanyu, Yuzuru (March 1, 2018a). 夢を生きる [Live Your Dream] (in Japanese). Chiyoda, Tokyo: Chuokoron-Shinsha. ch. 10: Special Interview Pyeongchang Olympics. ISBN 978-4120050497.
- Hanyu, Yuzuru (November 1, 2022). 羽生結弦 アマチュア時代 全記録 [Yuzuru Hanyu amateur career complete record] (in Japanese). Shinagawa, Tokyo: CCC Media House. ISBN 978-4484222233.
- Ice Jewels (February 9, 2017). 羽生結弦インタビュー「進化の方程式」 [Special Interview with Yuzuru Hanyu: "The Formula of Evolution"]. Ice Jewels (mook) (in Japanese). Vol. 5. Minato, Tokyo: Kazi Co., Ltd. ISBN 978-4807295746.
- Jojima, Mitsuru (April 2, 2015). ユヅルが初めてリンクに立った日 [The day Yuzuru stood on the ice for the first time]. Sports Graphic Number (in Japanese). Vol. 785. Chiyoda, Tokyo: Bungeishunjū. ch. 4. JAN 4910268530453.
- Makabe, Kikuo (February 1, 2021). 志～アイスショーに賭ける夢～ [Aspiration: Dream to bet on an ice show] (in Japanese). Bunkyo, Tokyo: Shinshokan. ISBN 978-4403231278.
- Petkevich, John Misha (March 1, 1989). "Figure Skating: Championship Techniques". Sports Illustrated. New York City: Penguin Books. ISBN 978-0452262096.
- Russell, Susan D. (September 6, 2022). "Yuzuru Hanyu – An icon leaves the competitive stage". International Figure Skating. Denville Township, New Jersey. pp. 22–33. IFSISS22-05.
- Todoroki, Aimi (October 7, 2021). 羽生結弦 – フィギュアスケート史に燦然と輝く栄光の軌跡 [Yuzuru Hanyu – The track of glory shining brightly in the history of figure skating]. Non-no (in Japanese). Chiyoda, Tokyo: Shueisha. Archived from the original on October 8, 2021.
- Utsunomiya, Naoko (June 22, 2016). 羽生結弦の扉 [Yuzuru Hanyu's Door]. オール讀物 (All Read) (in Japanese). Chiyoda, Tokyo: Bungeishunjū. ch. 4. JAN 4910021030763.

World Record Holders
Preceded by Shoma Uno	Men's Short Program; November 3, 2018 – February 8, 2022	Succeeded by Nathan Chen
Preceded by Nathan Chen; Shoma Uno	Men's Free Skating; November 4, 2018 – February 9, 2019; March 23, 2019	Succeeded by Shoma Uno; Nathan Chen
Preceded by Nathan Chen	Men's Total Score; November 4, 2018 – March 23, 2019	Succeeded by Nathan Chen

Historical World Record Holders (before season 2018–19)
Preceded by Daisuke Takahashi; Patrick Chan	Men's Short Program; October 19, 2012 – March 13, 2013; December 5, 2013 – July 1, 2018	Succeeded by Patrick Chan; Historic record, the GOE system was changed.
Preceded by Patrick Chan	Men's Free Skating; November 28, 2015 – July 1, 2018	Succeeded by Historic record, the GOE system was changed.
Preceded by Patrick Chan	Men's Total Score; November 28, 2015 – July 1, 2018	Succeeded by Historic record, the GOE system was changed.
