= Ghislain Briand =

Canadian figure skating coach

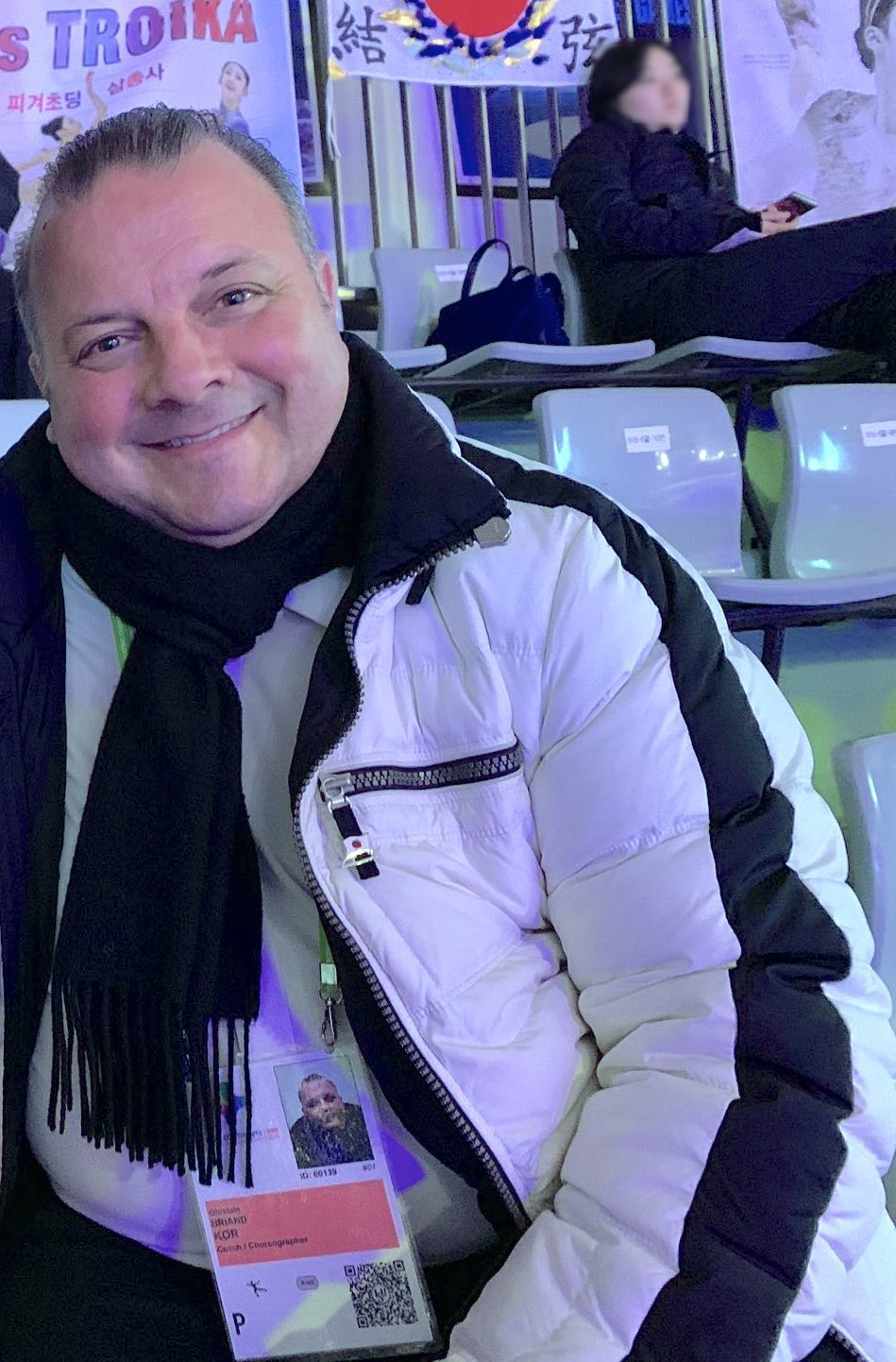
- Ghislain Briand at 2020 Four Continents Championships

Personal information
- Full name: 22 November 1962 (age 63)
- Born: Saint-Michel, Montreal, Québec

Figure skating career
- Country: Canada
- Skating club: Toronto Cricket Skating and Curling Club

Ghislain Briand is a Canadian figure skating coach and former competitor. Among his students are Elvis Stojko, two-time Olympic silver medallist, and Yuzuru Hanyu, two-time Olympic gold medallist.

== Coaching career ==
His coaching career has evolved in the metropolitan area of Toronto. After retiring from his skating career, Briand ran clubs in Gaspé Peninsula and the Montreal area for 12 years before accepting a job at the Mariposa School of Skating in Barrie. Until 2001, he had notably been working with Elvis Stojko, two-time Olympic silver medallist (1994, 1998) and three-time World Champion (1994, 1995, 1997).

In 2005, Ghislain Briand was hired by the Toronto Cricket Skating and Curling Club. He was already transitioning to a position of financial adviser when he applied to the Toronto Cricket Skating and Curling Club, upon the invitation from long-time friend Brian Orser. He is working as a jump specialist. In this regard, he goes regularly to the Skating School of Switzerland to teach jumping technique during the off-season.

At the Toronto Cricket Skating and Curling Club, he coached for a short time Adam Rippon. Since 2014, he is coaching Yuzuru Hanyu, two-time Olympic gold medallist (2014, 2018) and two-time World Champion (2014, 2017) after Brian Orser asked him to supervise him a few weeks before the 2014 Olympic Games.″I've always liked to push my analysis of jump biomechanics. I've developed my own way to work on it, which is a bit different from others and Yuzu (ie. Yuzuru Hanyu) adhered to my technique.″ Briand also pointed out that "the health of young athletes is very valuable and injury prevention should be the number one priority for all coaches."

His current and former students have included:

- (Switzerland) Noah Bodenstein
- (South Korea) Choi Da-bin
- (United States) Christina Gao
- (Georgia (country)) Elene Gedevanishvili
- (Japan) Yuzuru Hanyu
- (Sweden) Joshi Helgesson
- (South Korea) Cha Jun-hwan
- (Spain) Sonia Lafuente
- (Japan) Shingo Nishiyama
- (Spain) Javier Raya
- (United States) Adam Rippon
- (South Korea) An So-hyun
- (Canada) Elvis Stojko
- (Switzerland) Ean Weiler
- (South Korea) You Young
