= International Sports Press Association =

International organisation of sports journalists

- Association Internationale de la Presse Sportive
- Abbreviation: AIPS
- Formation: 1924
- Headquarters: Lausanne, Switzerland
- President: Gianni Merlo
- Website: Official website

International Sports Press Association (AIPS; French: Association Internationale de la Presse Sportive) is an international organization representing sports journalists and sports media professionals. It was founded in Paris in 1924 and is headquartered in Lausanne, Switzerland.

== History ==
=== Foundation ===
The International Sports Press Association was founded in Paris in 1924, shortly before the 1924 Summer Olympics. French sports journalist and sports administrator Frantz Reichel was a leading figure in its establishment and became its first president.

Belgian journalist and Olympian Victor Boin was also involved in the establishment of the organization and later succeeded Reichel as president.

Reichel had competed at the 1896 Summer Olympics and 1900 Summer Olympics and worked as a sports journalist. He remained president of AIPS until his death in 1932.

Boin succeeded Reichel as president and served until 1956. A former Olympic competitor in swimming, water polo and fencing, Boin was involved in the development of sports journalism and the Olympic movement.

=== Development ===
AIPS subsequently developed into an international organization representing national associations of sports journalists. Its activities include promoting cooperation among sports journalists and defending their professional interests and independence.

The organization has maintained links with the Olympic movement and international sports organizations. Its statutes define AIPS as an international non-profit association representing sports journalists and media professionals.

In 2006, AIPS established its legal seat in Lausanne, Switzerland.

=== Centenary ===
AIPS marked its centenary in 2024. Centenary events were held in Paris during the 2024 Summer Olympics, including a celebration at UNESCO headquarters. As part of the centenary celebrations, AIPS conducted its "Best Champions of the Century" poll, with 913 sports journalists participating. The poll produced separate top-10 rankings for male and female champions. Serena Williams was voted the best female champion, while Muhammad Ali was voted the best male champion.

== Organization ==
AIPS is governed by its statutes and consists of national sports journalists' associations. It is organized into four continental sections: Africa, America, Asia and Europe.

According to Special Olympics, AIPS has 161 member National Sports Journalists Associations across its four continental sections and almost 10,000 individual members.

The organization states that its objectives include strengthening cooperation between its members, defending the professional interests and independence of sports journalists, promoting solidarity among sports journalists, and improving working conditions for sports media professionals.

== Activities ==
AIPS works with international and continental sports federations on matters concerning working conditions for professional sports media.

AIPS issues the AIPS Card, an international press credential for sports journalists. It also operates programs intended to support young sports journalists, including the AIPS Young Reporters Programme.

The Young Reporters Programme provides aspiring journalists with opportunities to cover major sporting events and receive training in areas including print, photography and online reporting.

== Partnerships ==
In 2014, AIPS became the first Global Impact Partner of Special Olympics. The partnership uses sports and media to increase awareness of and promote inclusion for people with intellectual disabilities.

Through the partnership, AIPS and its network of journalists have supported the promotion of Special Olympics and its mission of respect and acceptance for people with intellectual disabilities.

== AIPS Sport Media Awards ==
The AIPS Sport Media Awards are international awards organized by AIPS to recognize excellence in sports journalism and sports media. The awards recognize work across multiple media categories.

== World Sports Journalists Day ==
World Sports Journalists Day is observed annually on 2 July in connection with the founding of AIPS in 1924.
