= 2019–20 ISU World Standings and Season's World Ranking =

Merit-based ice skating ranking

Season-end No. 1 skaters
- Men's singles: (United States) Nathan Chen
- Ladies' singles: (Japan) Rika Kihira
- Pairs: (Russia) Evgenia Tarasova / Vladimir Morozov
- Ice dance: (Russia) Victoria Sinitsina / Nikita Katsalapov

Season's No. 1 skaters
- Men's singles: (Japan) Yuzuru Hanyu
- Ladies' singles: (Russia) Alena Kostornaia
- Pairs: (China) Peng Cheng / Jin Yang
- Ice dance: (United States) Madison Chock / Evan Bates

Season-end No. 1 teams
- Senior Synchronized: (Finland) Team Marigold Ice Unity
- Junior Synchronized: (Russia) Team Junost Junior

Season's No. 1 teams
- Senior Synchronized: (Finland) Team Helsinki Rockettes
- Junior Synchronized: (Russia) Team Junost Junior

Navigation

The 2019–20 ISU World Standings and Season's World Ranking are the World Standings and Season's World Ranking published by the International Skating Union (ISU) during the 2019–20 season.

The single & pair skating and ice dance rankings take into account results of the 2017–18, 2018–19, and 2019–20 seasons.

The 2019-20 ISU season's world ranking is based on the results of the 2019–20 season only.

The 2019–20 ISU world standings for synchronized skating are based on the results of the 2017–18, 2018–19, and 2019–20 seasons.

== World Standings for single & pair skating and ice dance ==
=== Season-end standings ===
==== Men's singles ====
As of March 6, 2020.

Rank	Nation	Skater	Points	Season	ISU Championships or Olympics	(Junior) Grand Prix and Final		Selected International Competition	
Rank	Nation	Skater	Points	Season	Best	Best	2nd Best	Best	2nd Best
1	USA	Nathan Chen	4810	2019/2020 season (100%)		800	400		
1	USA	Nathan Chen	4810	2018/2019 season (100%)	1200	800	(400)		
1	USA	Nathan Chen	4810	2017/2018 season (70%)	840	560	(280)	210	
2	JPN	Yuzuru Hanyu	4629	2019/2020 season (100%)	840	720	400	300	
2	JPN	Yuzuru Hanyu	4629	2018/2019 season (100%)	1080	400	400	300	
2	JPN	Yuzuru Hanyu	4629	2017/2018 season (70%)	(840)	(252)		189	
3	JPN	Shoma Uno	4607	2019/2020 season (100%)		292	(191)	300	250
3	JPN	Shoma Uno	4607	2018/2019 season (100%)	875	720	400	300	
3	JPN	Shoma Uno	4607	2017/2018 season (70%)	756	504	(280)	210	
4	RUS	Dmitri Aliev	3805	2019/2020 season (100%)	840	472	360	300	270
4	RUS	Dmitri Aliev	3805	2018/2019 season (100%)		292	262	270	(198)
4	RUS	Dmitri Aliev	3805	2017/2018 season (70%)	529	(165)	(134)	210	
5	RUS	Mikhail Kolyada	3670	2019/2020 season (100%)					
5	RUS	Mikhail Kolyada	3670	2018/2019 season (100%)	709	292	292	300	300
5	RUS	Mikhail Kolyada	3670	2017/2018 season (70%)	680	454	280	210	153
6	USA	Jason Brown	3627	2019/2020 season (100%)	756	360	262	300	
6	USA	Jason Brown	3627	2018/2019 season (100%)	551	360	(236)	300	219
6	USA	Jason Brown	3627	2017/2018 season (70%)	(476)	330	(252)	189	
7	RUS	Alexander Samarin	3612	2019/2020 season (100%)	(325)	583	400	250	219
7	RUS	Alexander Samarin	3612	2018/2019 season (100%)	756	324	292	243	198
7	RUS	Alexander Samarin	3612	2017/2018 season (70%)	347	(227)	(204)	(139)	
8	ITA	Matteo Rizzo	3389	2019/2020 season (100%)	551	324	236	270	243
8	ITA	Matteo Rizzo	3389	2018/2019 season (100%)	680	324	292	250	219
8	ITA	Matteo Rizzo	3389	2017/2018 season (70%)	(284)	(175)	(104)	(210)	(158)
9	CHN	Jin Boyang	3349	2019/2020 season (100%)	(612)	525	400	300	
9	CHN	Jin Boyang	3349	2018/2019 season (100%)	787	262			
9	CHN	Jin Boyang	3349	2017/2018 season (70%)	613	252	(204)	210	
10	KOR	Cha Jun-hwan	3205	2019/2020 season (100%)	551	236	191	219	
10	KOR	Cha Jun-hwan	3205	2018/2019 season (100%)	496	648	324	270	270
10	KOR	Cha Jun-hwan	3205	2017/2018 season (70%)	(193)				
11	CAN	Keegan Messing	3196	2019/2020 season (100%)	402	292	292	243	
11	CAN	Keegan Messing	3196	2018/2019 season (100%)	612	525	360	300	
11	CAN	Keegan Messing	3196	2017/2018 season (70%)	(402)	(183)	(134)	170	
12	USA	Vincent Zhou	3147	2019/2020 season (100%)				243	
12	USA	Vincent Zhou	3147	2018/2019 season (100%)	972	292	262	270	219
12	USA	Vincent Zhou	3147	2017/2018 season (70%)	496	204		189	
13	ITA	Daniel Grassl	3082	2019/2020 season (100%)	612	250	207	300	300
13	ITA	Daniel Grassl	3082	2018/2019 season (100%)	496	203	164	300	250
13	ITA	Daniel Grassl	3082	2017/2018 season (70%)		(104)	(93)	(175)	(175)
14	GEO	Morisi Kvitelashvili	3057	2019/2020 season (100%)	680	292	213	270	250
14	GEO	Morisi Kvitelashvili	3057	2018/2019 season (100%)	339	360	191	243	219
14	GEO	Morisi Kvitelashvili	3057	2017/2018 season (70%)	(185)	(183)	(165)	(210)	(189)
15	LAT	Deniss Vasiļjevs	2812	2019/2020 season (100%)	496	262	236	243	
15	LAT	Deniss Vasiļjevs	2812	2018/2019 season (100%)	(293)	213	191	250	250
15	LAT	Deniss Vasiļjevs	2812	2017/2018 season (70%)	496	(165)	(134)	175	(153)
16	JPN	Keiji Tanaka	2785	2019/2020 season (100%)		324	262	300	225
16	JPN	Keiji Tanaka	2785	2018/2019 season (100%)	446	191	191	243	
16	JPN	Keiji Tanaka	2785	2017/2018 season (70%)	428	(149)		175	101
17	FRA	Kévin Aymoz	2738	2019/2020 season (100%)		648	360	270	
17	FRA	Kévin Aymoz	2738	2018/2019 season (100%)	612	262	213	198	
17	FRA	Kévin Aymoz	2738	2017/2018 season (70%)				175	
18	CAN	Nam Nguyen	2599	2019/2020 season (100%)	496	360	262	219	
18	CAN	Nam Nguyen	2599	2018/2019 season (100%)	325	262	236	300	
18	CAN	Nam Nguyen	2599	2017/2018 season (70%)	(253)	(149)		139	
19	JPN	Kazuki Tomono	2578	2019/2020 season (100%)	446	262	191	160	
19	JPN	Kazuki Tomono	2578	2018/2019 season (100%)	(264)	324		198	
19	JPN	Kazuki Tomono	2578	2017/2018 season (70%)	551	149		158	139
20	CZE	Michal Březina	2523	2019/2020 season (100%)	446				
20	CZE	Michal Březina	2523	2018/2019 season (100%)	574	583	360	270	
20	CZE	Michal Březina	2523	2017/2018 season (70%)	(326)	165		125	
21	RUS	Sergei Voronov	2379	2019/2020 season (100%)		292	(236)	178	
21	RUS	Sergei Voronov	2379	2018/2019 season (100%)		472	360	270	
21	RUS	Sergei Voronov	2379	2017/2018 season (70%)		408	(280)	210	189
22	ISR	Alexei Bychenko	2374	2019/2020 season (100%)	(264)	213		243	219
22	ISR	Alexei Bychenko	2374	2018/2019 season (100%)	362				
22	ISR	Alexei Bychenko	2374	2017/2018 season (70%)	613	227	183	189	127
23	USA	Camden Pulkinen	2261	2019/2020 season (100%)	293	292	(191)	198	178
23	USA	Camden Pulkinen	2261	2018/2019 season (100%)	239	250	230	182	178
23	USA	Camden Pulkinen	2261	2017/2018 season (70%)	(207)	221	(175)		
24	USA	Tomoki Hiwatashi	2157	2019/2020 season (100%)	362	262		198	
24	USA	Tomoki Hiwatashi	2157	2018/2019 season (100%)	500	225	225	243	
24	USA	Tomoki Hiwatashi	2157	2017/2018 season (70%)	(186)	142	(142)		
25	RUS	Artur Danielian	2136	2019/2020 season (100%)	756	225	225	219	
25	RUS	Artur Danielian	2136	2018/2019 season (100%)	365	182	164		
25	RUS	Artur Danielian	2136	2017/2018 season (70%)	(315)	(93)			
26	FRA	Adam Siao Him Fa	2055	2019/2020 season (100%)	293	164	120	243	160
26	FRA	Adam Siao Him Fa	2055	2018/2019 season (100%)	295	255	250	160	
26	FRA	Adam Siao Him Fa	2055	2017/2018 season (70%)	(65)	(76)	(76)	115	
27	RUS	Petr Gumennik	1914	2019/2020 season (100%)	405	250	230	270	
27	RUS	Petr Gumennik	1914	2018/2019 season (100%)	194	315	250		
27	RUS	Petr Gumennik	1914	2017/2018 season (70%)					
28	USA	Andrew Torgashev	1905	2019/2020 season (100%)	239	182	182	270	
28	USA	Andrew Torgashev	1905	2018/2019 season (100%)		250	182	250	225
28	USA	Andrew Torgashev	1905	2017/2018 season (70%)		(158)	(145)	125	
29	RUS	Andrei Lazukin	1858	2019/2020 season (100%)		191		160	
29	RUS	Andrei Lazukin	1858	2018/2019 season (100%)	465	236	213	243	225
29	RUS	Andrei Lazukin	1858	2017/2018 season (70%)				125	(101)
30	USA	Alexei Krasnozhon	1854	2019/2020 season (100%)				219	
30	USA	Alexei Krasnozhon	1854	2018/2019 season (100%)	174	213	191	250	198
30	USA	Alexei Krasnozhon	1854	2017/2018 season (70%)		245	175	189	(127)
31	JPN	Yuma Kagiyama	1817	2019/2020 season (100%)	680	255	250		
31	JPN	Yuma Kagiyama	1817	2018/2019 season (100%)		225	182	225	
31	JPN	Yuma Kagiyama	1817	2017/2018 season (70%)					
32	AUS	Brendan Kerry	1792	2019/2020 season (100%)	264	213		250	203
32	AUS	Brendan Kerry	1792	2018/2019 season (100%)	362			250	250
32	AUS	Brendan Kerry	1792	2017/2018 season (70%)	(166)			(170)	(170)
33	RUS	Andrei Mozalev	1763	2019/2020 season (100%)	500	315	250	300	
33	RUS	Andrei Mozalev	1763	2018/2019 season (100%)		250	148		
33	RUS	Andrei Mozalev	1763	2017/2018 season (70%)					
34	RUS	Roman Savosin	1683	2019/2020 season (100%)					
34	RUS	Roman Savosin	1683	2018/2019 season (100%)	450	203	164	198	
34	RUS	Roman Savosin	1683	2017/2018 season (70%)	230	158	127	153	
35	RUS	Makar Ignatov	1668	2019/2020 season (100%)		324	213	300	243
35	RUS	Makar Ignatov	1668	2018/2019 season (100%)					
35	RUS	Makar Ignatov	1668	2017/2018 season (70%)		179	158	139	112
36	AZE	Vladimir Litvintsev	1632	2019/2020 season (100%)	362			250	203
36	AZE	Vladimir Litvintsev	1632	2018/2019 season (100%)	222	120		250	225
36	AZE	Vladimir Litvintsev	1632	2017/2018 season (70%)					
37	JPN	Sōta Yamamoto	1562	2019/2020 season (100%)		236		270	270
37	JPN	Sōta Yamamoto	1562	2018/2019 season (100%)		236		300	250
37	JPN	Sōta Yamamoto	1562	2017/2018 season (70%)				(115)	
38	EST	Aleksandr Selevko	1527	2019/2020 season (100%)	215	164	120	225	219
38	EST	Aleksandr Selevko	1527	2018/2019 season (100%)	156			225	2013
38	EST	Aleksandr Selevko	1527	2017/2018 season (70%)					
39	CHN	Yan Han	1454	2019/2020 season (100%)	325	360			
39	CHN	Yan Han	1454	2018/2019 season (100%)					
39	CHN	Yan Han	1454	2017/2018 season (70%)	228	183	183	175	
40	JPN	Koshiro Shimada	1452	2019/2020 season (100%)				270	
40	JPN	Koshiro Shimada	1452	2018/2019 season (100%)	215	284	225	250	
40	JPN	Koshiro Shimada	1452	2017/2018 season (70%)		115	93		
41	ISR	Daniel Samohin	1430	2019/2020 season (100%)				198	
41	ISR	Daniel Samohin	1430	2018/2019 season (100%)	237	191		219	178
41	ISR	Daniel Samohin	1430	2017/2018 season (70%)	237			170	
42	GER	Paul Fentz	1424	2019/2020 season (100%)	402				
42	GER	Paul Fentz	1424	2018/2019 season (100%)	(192)	236		225	144
42	GER	Paul Fentz	1424	2017/2018 season (70%)	193			112	112
43	CAN	Stephen Gogolev	1410	2019/2020 season (100%)	93	225	164		
43	CAN	Stephen Gogolev	1410	2018/2019 season (100%)	328	350	250		
43	CAN	Stephen Gogolev	1410	2017/2018 season (70%)					
44	ISR	Mark Gorodnitsky	1376	2019/2020 season (100%)	156	164	133	164	160
44	ISR	Mark Gorodnitsky	1376	2018/2019 season (100%)	93	148	113	225	
44	ISR	Mark Gorodnitsky	1376	2017/2018 season (70%)	(89)	(115)	(68)		
45	ITA	Gabriele Frangipani	1370	2019/2020 season (100%)	237	133	108	219	
45	ITA	Gabriele Frangipani	1370	2018/2019 season (100%)	49	120	97	225	182
45	ITA	Gabriele Frangipani	1370	2017/2018 season (70%)					
46	GEO	Irakli Maysuradze	1335	2019/2020 season (100%)	214			250	225
46	GEO	Irakli Maysuradze	1335	2018/2019 season (100%)	266	133	120		
46	GEO	Irakli Maysuradze	1335	2017/2018 season (70%)	(110)	127			
47	JPN	Mitsuki Sumoto	1331	2019/2020 season (100%)				198	
47	JPN	Mitsuki Sumoto	1331	2018/2019 season (100%)		225	164	219	
47	JPN	Mitsuki Sumoto	1331	2017/2018 season (70%)	151	199	175		
48	TUR	Başar Oktar	1286	2019/2020 season (100%)	75	97	97	225	
48	TUR	Başar Oktar	1286	2018/2019 season (100%)	75			164	164
48	TUR	Başar Oktar	1286	2017/2018 season (70%)		127	104	158	
49	CAN	Joseph Phan	1284	2019/2020 season (100%)	157	164	148	198	
49	CAN	Joseph Phan	1284	2018/2019 season (100%)	(157)	203	(108)		
49	CAN	Joseph Phan	1284	2017/2018 season (70%)	256	158	(127)		
50	CAN	Roman Sadovsky	1253	2019/2020 season (100%)	173	324		243	
50	CAN	Roman Sadovsky	1253	2018/2019 season (100%)				270	243
50	CAN	Roman Sadovsky	1253	2017/2018 season (70%)					
51	CAN	Nicolas Nadeau	1212	2019/2020 season (100%)		213	213		
51	CAN	Nicolas Nadeau	1212	2018/2019 season (100%)	293			219	
51	CAN	Nicolas Nadeau	1212	2017/2018 season (70%)		149		125	
52	UKR	Ivan Shmuratko	1211	2019/2020 season (100%)	114	203	133	225	
52	UKR	Ivan Shmuratko	1211	2018/2019 season (100%)	103	133	97	203	
52	UKR	Ivan Shmuratko	1211	2017/2018 season (70%)					
53	AUT	Luc Maierhofer	1203	2019/2020 season (100%)		120		225	178
53	AUT	Luc Maierhofer	1203	2018/2019 season (100%)	113	108	97	198	164
53	AUT	Luc Maierhofer	1203	2017/2018 season (70%)				(115)	
54	JPN	Shun Sato	1145	2019/2020 season (100%)	295	350	250	250	
54	JPN	Shun Sato	1145	2018/2019 season (100%)					
54	JPN	Shun Sato	1145	2017/2018 season (70%)					
55	KOR	Lee Si-hyeong	1121	2019/2020 season (100%)	214	225	148	198	
55	KOR	Lee Si-hyeong	1121	2018/2019 season (100%)	192				
55	KOR	Lee Si-hyeong	1121	2017/2018 season (70%)	(122)	76	68		
56	USA	Adam Rippon	1116	2019/2020 season (100%)					
56	USA	Adam Rippon	1116	2018/2019 season (100%)					
56	USA	Adam Rippon	1116	2017/2018 season (70%)	326	368	252	170	
57	CAN	Conrad Orzel	1101	2019/2020 season (100%)				178	
57	CAN	Conrad Orzel	1101	2018/2019 season (100%)		182	182	225	
57	CAN	Conrad Orzel	1101	2017/2018 season (70%)	99	142	93		
58	ARM	Slavik Hayrapetyan	1060	2019/2020 season (100%)	140			182	182
58	ARM	Slavik Hayrapetyan	1060	2018/2019 season (100%)				219	203
58	ARM	Slavik Hayrapetyan	1060	2017/2018 season (70%)	134			(101)	
59	RUS	Egor Murashov	1059	2019/2020 season (100%)				198	
59	RUS	Egor Murashov	1059	2018/2019 season (100%)		182		250	203
59	RUS	Egor Murashov	1059	2017/2018 season (70%)		142	84		
60	MAS	Julian Zhi Jie Yee	1054	2019/2020 season (100%)				178	
60	MAS	Julian Zhi Jie Yee	1054	2018/2019 season (100%)	118	213		160	
60	MAS	Julian Zhi Jie Yee	1054	2017/2018 season (70%)	121			139	125
61	USA	Ryan Dunk	1031	2019/2020 season (100%)		164	148	243	
61	USA	Ryan Dunk	1031	2018/2019 season (100%)		164	148	164	
61	USA	Ryan Dunk	1031	2017/2018 season (70%)		(76)			
62	NOR	Sondre Oddvoll Bøe	1019	2019/2020 season (100%)	102			182	
62	NOR	Sondre Oddvoll Bøe	1019	2018/2019 season (100%)	140			250	203
62	NOR	Sondre Oddvoll Bøe	1019	2017/2018 season (70%)	(64)			142	
63	BLR	Alexander Lebedev	968	2019/2020 season (100%)	92	120		164	164
63	BLR	Alexander Lebedev	968	2018/2019 season (100%)				225	203
63	BLR	Alexander Lebedev	968	2017/2018 season (70%)					
64	AUT	Maurizio Zandron	1059	2019/2020 season (100%)				250	225
64	AUT	Maurizio Zandron	1059	2018/2019 season (100%)				250	225
64	AUT	Maurizio Zandron	1059	2017/2018 season (70%)				(175)	(158)
65	UZB	Misha Ge	946	2019/2020 season (100%)					
65	UZB	Misha Ge	946	2018/2019 season (100%)					
65	UZB	Misha Ge	946	2017/2018 season (70%)	362	227	204	153	
66	GBR	Graham Newberry	933	2019/2020 season (100%)				225	178
66	GBR	Graham Newberry	933	2018/2019 season (100%)	102			225	203
66	GBR	Graham Newberry	933	2017/2018 season (70%)				(175)	(158)
67	TUR	Burak Demirboğa	927	2019/2020 season (100%)	74			225	203
67	TUR	Burak Demirboğa	927	2018/2019 season (100%)				203	164
67	TUR	Burak Demirboğa	927	2017/2018 season (70%)	58			(142)	(127)
68	FRA	Luc Economides	919	2019/2020 season (100%)				250	
68	FRA	Luc Economides	919	2018/2019 season (100%)				160	144
68	FRA	Luc Economides	919	2017/2018 season (70%)	80	158	127		
69	CZE	Matyáš Bělohradský	914	2019/2020 season (100%)	113	148			
69	CZE	Matyáš Bělohradský	914	2018/2019 season (100%)	126	148	97	178	
69	CZE	Matyáš Bělohradský	914	2017/2018 season (70%)		104			
70	JPN	Yuto Kishina	904	2019/2020 season (100%)				203	
70	JPN	Yuto Kishina	904	2018/2019 season (100%)		203	108	182	
70	JPN	Yuto Kishina	904	2017/2018 season (70%)		115	93		
71	KOR	Lee June-hyoung	896	2019/2020 season (100%)	156			243	144
71	KOR	Lee June-hyoung	896	2018/2019 season (100%)	214				
71	KOR	Lee June-hyoung	896	2017/2018 season (70%)	(150)			139	
72	SUI	Lukas Britschgi	872	2019/2020 season (100%)	126			203	182
72	SUI	Lukas Britschgi	872	2018/2019 season (100%)				203	(144)
72	SUI	Lukas Britschgi	872	2017/2018 season (70%)				158	(142)
73	USA	Jimmy Ma	865	2019/2020 season (100%)				219	178
73	USA	Jimmy Ma	865	2018/2019 season (100%)				243	225
73	USA	Jimmy Ma	865	2017/2018 season (70%)					
74	SWE	Nikolaj Majorov	863	2019/2020 season (100%)	192			225	144
74	SWE	Nikolaj Majorov	863	2018/2019 season (100%)	61	133	108		
74	SWE	Nikolaj Majorov	863	2017/2018 season (70%)					
75	RUS	Alexey Erokhov	860	2019/2020 season (100%)					
75	RUS	Alexey Erokhov	860	2018/2019 season (100%)				160	
75	RUS	Alexey Erokhov	860	2017/2018 season (70%)	350	175	175		
76	TPE	Tsao Chih-i	814	2019/2020 season (100%)	83				
76	TPE	Tsao Chih-i	814	2018/2019 season (100%)				270	225
76	TPE	Tsao Chih-i	814	2017/2018 season (70%)	109			127	
77	BUL	Nicky Obreykov	774	2019/2020 season (100%)				203	164
77	BUL	Nicky Obreykov	774	2018/2019 season (100%)				225	182
77	BUL	Nicky Obreykov	774	2017/2018 season (70%)				(115)	
78	FIN	Valtter Virtanen	752	2019/2020 season (100%)				182	
78	FIN	Valtter Virtanen	752	2018/2019 season (100%)				164	160
78	FIN	Valtter Virtanen	752	2017/2018 season (70%)	88			158	(142)
79	BUL	Larry Loupolover	747	2019/2020 season (100%)	83			250	182
79	BUL	Larry Loupolover	747	2018/2019 season (100%)				164	
79	BUL	Larry Loupolover	747	2017/2018 season (70%)		68			
79	EST	Daniel Albert Naurits	747	2019/2020 season (100%)				203	182
79	EST	Daniel Albert Naurits	747	2018/2019 season (100%)				164	
79	EST	Daniel Albert Naurits	747	2017/2018 season (70%)	71			127	(127)
81	SUI	Nicola Todeschini	732	2019/2020 season (100%)				164	
81	SUI	Nicola Todeschini	732	2018/2019 season (100%)				250	203
81	SUI	Nicola Todeschini	732	2017/2018 season (70%)				115	
82	GER	Jonathan Hess	719	2019/2020 season (100%)				182	164
82	GER	Jonathan Hess	719	2018/2019 season (100%)	55			182	
82	GER	Jonathan Hess	719	2017/2018 season (70%)	136				
83	KOR	Cha Young-hyun	698	2019/2020 season (100%)		164		160	
83	KOR	Cha Young-hyun	698	2018/2019 season (100%)	68	133	120		
83	KOR	Cha Young-hyun	698	2017/2018 season (70%)	53				
84	POL	Igor Reznichenko	694	2019/2020 season (100%)					
84	POL	Igor Reznichenko	694	2018/2019 season (100%)				164	164
84	POL	Igor Reznichenko	694	2017/2018 season (70%)	52			175	139
85	GBR	Peter James Hallam	687	2019/2020 season (100%)				144	
85	GBR	Peter James Hallam	687	2018/2019 season (100%)				203	182
85	GBR	Peter James Hallam	687	2017/2018 season (70%)				158	
86	FRA	Adrien Tesson	680	2019/2020 season (100%)				203	160
86	FRA	Adrien Tesson	680	2018/2019 season (100%)					
86	FRA	Adrien Tesson	680	2017/2018 season (70%)				175	142
87	FRA	Romain Ponsart	678	2019/2020 season (100%)					
87	FRA	Romain Ponsart	678	2018/2019 season (100%)		236			
87	FRA	Romain Ponsart	678	2017/2018 season (70%)	173			142	127
88	RUS	Artem Kovalev	668	2019/2020 season (100%)				270	250
88	RUS	Artem Kovalev	668	2018/2019 season (100%)		148			
88	RUS	Artem Kovalev	668	2017/2018 season (70%)					
89	CZE	Jiří Bělohradský	666	2019/2020 season (100%)				160	
89	CZE	Jiří Bělohradský	666	2018/2019 season (100%)				182	144
89	CZE	Jiří Bělohradský	666	2017/2018 season (70%)		104	76		
90	EST	Mihhail Selevko	653	2019/2020 season (100%)		108	97	250	198
90	EST	Mihhail Selevko	653	2018/2019 season (100%)					
90	EST	Mihhail Selevko	653	2017/2018 season (70%)					
91	ITA	Jari Kessler	651	2019/2020 season (100%)					
91	ITA	Jari Kessler	651	2018/2019 season (100%)				203	164
91	ITA	Jari Kessler	651	2017/2018 season (70%)				142	142
92	HKG	Harrison Jon-Yen Wong	647	2019/2020 season (100%)	92				
92	HKG	Harrison Jon-Yen Wong	647	2018/2019 season (100%)	102			178	160
92	HKG	Harrison Jon-Yen Wong	647	2017/2018 season (70%)				115	
93	HUN	Alexander Maszljanko	639	2019/2020 season (100%)					
93	HUN	Alexander Maszljanko	639	2018/2019 season (100%)				203	182
93	HUN	Alexander Maszljanko	639	2017/2018 season (70%)				127	127
94	UKR	Yaroslav Paniot	636	2019/2020 season (100%)					
94	UKR	Yaroslav Paniot	636	2018/2019 season (100%)				164	144
94	UKR	Yaroslav Paniot	636	2017/2018 season (70%)				170	158
95	SVK	Michael Neuman	625	2019/2020 season (100%)				164	
95	SVK	Michael Neuman	625	2018/2019 season (100%)				182	164
95	SVK	Michael Neuman	625	2017/2018 season (70%)				115	
96	RUS	Anton Shulepov	594	2019/2020 season (100%)		191			
96	RUS	Anton Shulepov	594	2018/2019 season (100%)				243	160
96	RUS	Anton Shulepov	594	2017/2018 season (70%)					
97	JPN	Sena Miyake	586	2019/2020 season (100%)		97			
97	JPN	Sena Miyake	586	2018/2019 season (100%)		97		250	
97	JPN	Sena Miyake	586	2017/2018 season (70%)	58	84			
98	CAN	Iliya Kovler	581	2019/2020 season (100%)		148	97		
98	CAN	Iliya Kovler	581	2018/2019 season (100%)		203	133		
98	CAN	Iliya Kovler	581	2017/2018 season (70%)					
99	RUS	Ilya Yablokov	579	2019/2020 season (100%)	194	203	182		
99	RUS	Ilya Yablokov	579	2018/2019 season (100%)					
99	RUS	Ilya Yablokov	579	2017/2018 season (70%)					
100	BLR	Konstantin Milyukov	576	2019/2020 season (100%)				182	
100	BLR	Konstantin Milyukov	576	2018/2019 season (100%)				219	
100	BLR	Konstantin Milyukov	576	2017/2018 season (70%)				175	
101	BUL	Alexander Zlatkov	567	2019/2020 season (100%)				182	
101	BUL	Alexander Zlatkov	567	2018/2019 season (100%)				203	182
101	BUL	Alexander Zlatkov	567	2017/2018 season (70%)					
101	RUS	Gleb Lutfullin	567	2019/2020 season (100%)		203	182	182	
101	RUS	Gleb Lutfullin	567	2018/2019 season (100%)					
101	RUS	Gleb Lutfullin	567	2017/2018 season (70%)					
103	KOR	An Geon-hyeong	550	2019/2020 season (100%)					
103	KOR	An Geon-hyeong	550	2018/2019 season (100%)		164	97		
103	KOR	An Geon-hyeong	550	2017/2018 season (70%)	79	68		142	
104	USA	Maxim Naumov	545	2019/2020 season (100%)	328	133			
104	USA	Maxim Naumov	545	2018/2019 season (100%)					
104	USA	Maxim Naumov	545	2017/2018 season (70%)		84			
105	RUS	Daniil Samsonov	534	2019/2020 season (100%)		284	250		
105	RUS	Daniil Samsonov	534	2018/2019 season (100%)					
105	RUS	Daniil Samsonov	534	2017/2018 season (70%)					
106	FIN	Roman Galay	520	2019/2020 season (100%)				178	160
106	FIN	Roman Galay	520	2018/2019 season (100%)				182	
106	FIN	Roman Galay	520	2017/2018 season (70%)					
107	AUS	Andrew Dodds	511	2019/2020 season (100%)					
107	AUS	Andrew Dodds	511	2018/2019 season (100%)	237			203	
107	AUS	Andrew Dodds	511	2017/2018 season (70%)	71				
108	UKR	Ivan Pavlov	498	2019/2020 season (100%)					
108	UKR	Ivan Pavlov	498	2018/2019 season (100%)					
108	UKR	Ivan Pavlov	498	2017/2018 season (70%)	167	115	104	112	
109	CZE	Petr Kotlařík	494	2019/2020 season (100%)					
109	CZE	Petr Kotlařík	494	2018/2019 season (100%)				160	144
109	CZE	Petr Kotlařík	494	2017/2018 season (70%)	48			142	
110	CAN	Aleksa Rakic	493	2019/2020 season (100%)		225			
110	CAN	Aleksa Rakic	493	2018/2019 season (100%)		148	120		
110	CAN	Aleksa Rakic	493	2017/2018 season (70%)					
111	AUS	James Min	490	2019/2020 season (100%)	126			144	
111	AUS	James Min	490	2018/2019 season (100%)				144	
111	AUS	James Min	490	2017/2018 season (70%)		76			
112	ITA	Mattia Dalla Torre	476	2019/2020 season (100%)				203	
112	ITA	Mattia Dalla Torre	476	2018/2019 season (100%)					
112	ITA	Mattia Dalla Torre	476	2017/2018 season (70%)				158	115
113	RUS	Mark Kondratiuk	475	2019/2020 season (100%)				250	225
113	RUS	Mark Kondratiuk	475	2018/2019 season (100%)					
113	RUS	Mark Kondratiuk	475	2017/2018 season (70%)					
114	MON	Davide Lewton Brain	463	2019/2020 season (100%)				164	
114	MON	Davide Lewton Brain	463	2018/2019 season (100%)	74			225	
114	MON	Davide Lewton Brain	463	2017/2018 season (70%)					
114	RUS	Alexander Petrov	463	2019/2020 season (100%)					
114	RUS	Alexander Petrov	463	2018/2019 season (100%)				250	
114	RUS	Alexander Petrov	463	2017/2018 season (70%)				112	101
116	FRA	Chafik Besseghier	459	2019/2020 season (100%)					
116	FRA	Chafik Besseghier	459	2018/2019 season (100%)					
116	FRA	Chafik Besseghier	459	2017/2018 season (70%)	205			142	112
117	RUS	Egor Rukhin	457	2019/2020 season (100%)		182			
117	RUS	Egor Rukhin	457	2018/2019 season (100%)		133			
117	RUS	Egor Rukhin	457	2017/2018 season (70%)		142			
118	PHI	Christopher Caluza	444	2019/2020 season (100%)	140			160	144
118	PHI	Christopher Caluza	444	2018/2019 season (100%)					
118	PHI	Christopher Caluza	444	2017/2018 season (70%)					
119	MEX	Donovan Carrillo	441	2019/2020 season (100%)	192				
119	MEX	Donovan Carrillo	441	2018/2019 season (100%)	156				
119	MEX	Donovan Carrillo	441	2017/2018 season (70%)	(98)	93			
120	SUI	Stéphane Walker	429	2019/2020 season (100%)					
120	SUI	Stéphane Walker	429	2018/2019 season (100%)					
120	SUI	Stéphane Walker	429	2017/2018 season (70%)	98			189	142
120	USA	Ross Miner	429	2019/2020 season (100%)					
120	USA	Ross Miner	429	2018/2019 season (100%)					
120	USA	Ross Miner	429	2017/2018 season (70%)		165		139	125
122	KOR	Byun Se-jong	421	2019/2020 season (100%)				178	
122	KOR	Byun Se-jong	421	2018/2019 season (100%)				243	
122	KOR	Byun Se-jong	421	2017/2018 season (70%)					
123	USA	Ilia Malinin	418	2019/2020 season (100%)	103	182	133		
123	USA	Ilia Malinin	418	2018/2019 season (100%)					
123	USA	Ilia Malinin	418	2017/2018 season (70%)					
124	RUS	Artur Dmitriev	413	2019/2020 season (100%)					
124	RUS	Artur Dmitriev	413	2018/2019 season (100%)				243	
124	RUS	Artur Dmitriev	413	2017/2018 season (70%)				170	
125	SUI	Nurullah Sahaka	411	2019/2020 season (100%)				164	
125	SUI	Nurullah Sahaka	411	2018/2019 season (100%)					
125	SUI	Nurullah Sahaka	411	2017/2018 season (70%)	72			175	
126	CHN	Zhang He	410	2019/2020 season (100%)	237				
126	CHN	Zhang He	410	2018/2019 season (100%)	173				
126	CHN	Zhang He	410	2017/2018 season (70%)	(88)				
127	RUS	Kirill Iakovlev	407	2019/2020 season (100%)					
127	RUS	Kirill Iakovlev	407	2018/2019 season (100%)		225	182		
127	RUS	Kirill Iakovlev	407	2017/2018 season (70%)					
128	GER	Thomas Stoll	403	2019/2020 season (100%)					
128	GER	Thomas Stoll	403	2018/2019 season (100%)				144	144
128	GER	Thomas Stoll	403	2017/2018 season (70%)				115	
129	THA	Micah Kai Lynette	388	2019/2020 season (100%)	102			160	
129	THA	Micah Kai Lynette	388	2018/2019 season (100%)	126				
129	THA	Micah Kai Lynette	388	2017/2018 season (70%)	(34)				
130	USA	Grant Hochstein	358	2019/2020 season (100%)					
130	USA	Grant Hochstein	358	2018/2019 season (100%)					
130	USA	Grant Hochstein	358	2017/2018 season (70%)	205			153	
131	JPN	Tatsuya Tsuboi	357	2019/2020 season (100%)					
131	JPN	Tatsuya Tsuboi	357	2018/2019 season (100%)	127				
131	JPN	Tatsuya Tsuboi	357	2017/2018 season (70%)		115	115		
132	GER	Catalin Dimitrescu	346	2019/2020 season (100%)					
132	GER	Catalin Dimitrescu	346	2018/2019 season (100%)				182	164
132	GER	Catalin Dimitrescu	346	2017/2018 season (70%)					
133	FRA	Philip Warren	494	2019/2020 season (100%)				203	
133	FRA	Philip Warren	494	2018/2019 season (100%)					
133	FRA	Philip Warren	494	2017/2018 season (70%)				142	
134	RUS	Evgeni Semenenko	329	2019/2020 season (100%)				225	
134	RUS	Evgeni Semenenko	329	2018/2019 season (100%)					
134	RUS	Evgeni Semenenko	329	2017/2018 season (70%)		104			
135	ITA	Ivan Righini	328	2019/2020 season (100%)					
135	ITA	Ivan Righini	328	2018/2019 season (100%)					
135	ITA	Ivan Righini	328	2017/2018 season (70%)				175	153
136	NED	Thomas Kennes	322	2019/2020 season (100%)				164	
136	NED	Thomas Kennes	322	2018/2019 season (100%)					
136	NED	Thomas Kennes	322	2017/2018 season (70%)				158	
137	ESP	Javier Raya	316	2019/2020 season (100%)					
137	ESP	Javier Raya	316	2018/2019 season (100%)					
137	ESP	Javier Raya	316	2017/2018 season (70%)				158	158
138	JPN	Hiroaki Sato	305	2019/2020 season (100%)					
138	JPN	Hiroaki Sato	305	2018/2019 season (100%)				178	
138	JPN	Hiroaki Sato	305	2017/2018 season (70%)				127	
139	AUS	Mark Webster	302	2019/2020 season (100%)					
139	AUS	Mark Webster	302	2018/2019 season (100%)	74				
139	AUS	Mark Webster	302	2017/2018 season (70%)				127	101
140	KAZ	Abzal Rakimgaliev	300	2019/2020 season (100%)					
140	KAZ	Abzal Rakimgaliev	300	2018/2019 season (100%)					
140	KAZ	Abzal Rakimgaliev	300	2017/2018 season (70%)	58			127	115
141	TPE	Micah Tang	284	2019/2020 season (100%)				144	
141	TPE	Micah Tang	284	2018/2019 season (100%)	140				
141	TPE	Micah Tang	284	2017/2018 season (70%)					
142	JPN	Ryuju Hino	273	2019/2020 season (100%)					
142	JPN	Ryuju Hino	273	2018/2019 season (100%)					
142	JPN	Ryuju Hino	273	2017/2018 season (70%)				158	115
143	USA	Sean Rabbitt	261	2019/2020 season (100%)					
143	USA	Sean Rabbitt	261	2018/2019 season (100%)				160	
143	USA	Sean Rabbitt	261	2017/2018 season (70%)				101	
144	PHI	Edrian Paul Celestino	257	2019/2020 season (100%)	113			144	
144	PHI	Edrian Paul Celestino	257	2018/2019 season (100%)					
144	PHI	Edrian Paul Celestino	257	2017/2018 season (70%)					
145	RUS	Igor Efimchuk	257	2019/2020 season (100%)					
145	RUS	Igor Efimchuk	257	2018/2019 season (100%)					
145	RUS	Igor Efimchuk	257	2017/2018 season (70%)		142	115		
146	CHN	Chen Yudong	256	2019/2020 season (100%)		148	108		
146	CHN	Chen Yudong	256	2018/2019 season (100%)					
146	CHN	Chen Yudong	256	2017/2018 season (70%)					
147	RUS	Matvei Vetlugin	245	2019/2020 season (100%)		97			
147	RUS	Matvei Vetlugin	245	2018/2019 season (100%)		148			
147	RUS	Matvei Vetlugin	245	2017/2018 season (70%)					
148	CAN	Beres Clements	228	2019/2020 season (100%)		108			
148	CAN	Beres Clements	228	2018/2019 season (100%)		120			
148	CAN	Beres Clements	228	2017/2018 season (70%)					
148	KOR	Kyeong Jae-seok	228	2019/2020 season (100%)		120			
148	KOR	Kyeong Jae-seok	228	2018/2019 season (100%)		108			
148	KOR	Kyeong Jae-seok	228	2017/2018 season (70%)					
150	CZE	Daniel Mrázek	225	2019/2020 season (100%)					
150	CZE	Daniel Mrázek	225	2018/2019 season (100%)				225	
150	CZE	Daniel Mrázek	225	2017/2018 season (70%)					
151	SWE	Andreas Nordebäck	216	2019/2020 season (100%)					
151	SWE	Andreas Nordebäck	216	2018/2019 season (100%)		108	108		
151	SWE	Andreas Nordebäck	216	2017/2018 season (70%)					
152	USA	Dinh Tran	205	2019/2020 season (100%)		108			
152	USA	Dinh Tran	205	2018/2019 season (100%)		97			
152	USA	Dinh Tran	205	2017/2018 season (70%)					
153	RUS	Andrei Kutovoi	203	2019/2020 season (100%)		203			
153	RUS	Andrei Kutovoi	203	2018/2019 season (100%)					
153	RUS	Andrei Kutovoi	203	2017/2018 season (70%)					
154	RUS	Artem Lezheev	198	2019/2020 season (100%)					
154	RUS	Artem Lezheev	198	2018/2019 season (100%)				198	
154	RUS	Artem Lezheev	198	2017/2018 season (70%)					
155	FRA	Maxence Collet	195	2019/2020 season (100%)					
155	FRA	Maxence Collet	195	2018/2019 season (100%)					
155	FRA	Maxence Collet	195	2017/2018 season (70%)		68		127	
156	GER	Denis Gurdzhi	188	2019/2020 season (100%)	68	120			
156	GER	Denis Gurdzhi	188	2018/2019 season (100%)					
156	GER	Denis Gurdzhi	188	2017/2018 season (70%)					
157	CAN	Alec Guinzbourg	182	2019/2020 season (100%)		182			
157	CAN	Alec Guinzbourg	182	2018/2019 season (100%)					
157	CAN	Alec Guinzbourg	182	2017/2018 season (70%)					
157	IRL	Conor Stakelum	182	2019/2020 season (100%)					
157	IRL	Conor Stakelum	182	2018/2019 season (100%)				182	
157	IRL	Conor Stakelum	182	2017/2018 season (70%)					
159	CAN	Bennet Toman	178	2019/2020 season (100%)					
159	CAN	Bennet Toman	178	2018/2019 season (100%)				178	
159	CAN	Bennet Toman	178	2017/2018 season (70%)					
160	CHN	Hao Yan	168	2019/2020 season (100%)					
160	CHN	Hao Yan	168	2018/2019 season (100%)					
160	CHN	Hao Yan	168	2017/2018 season (70%)		84	84		
161	GER	Kai Jagoda	164	2019/2020 season (100%)				164	
161	GER	Kai Jagoda	164	2018/2019 season (100%)					
161	GER	Kai Jagoda	164	2017/2018 season (70%)					
161	KAZ	Rakhat Bralin	164	2019/2020 season (100%)				164	
161	KAZ	Rakhat Bralin	164	2018/2019 season (100%)					
161	KAZ	Rakhat Bralin	164	2017/2018 season (70%)					
163	KOR	Park Sung-hoon	160	2019/2020 season (100%)					
163	KOR	Park Sung-hoon	160	2018/2019 season (100%)				160	
163	KOR	Park Sung-hoon	160	2017/2018 season (70%)					
164	ITA	Alessandro Fadini	158	2019/2020 season (100%)					
164	ITA	Alessandro Fadini	158	2018/2019 season (100%)					
164	ITA	Alessandro Fadini	158	2017/2018 season (70%)				158	
164	RUS	Vladimir Samoilov	158	2019/2020 season (100%)					
164	RUS	Vladimir Samoilov	158	2018/2019 season (100%)					
164	RUS	Vladimir Samoilov	158	2017/2018 season (70%)		158			
166	USA	Matthew Nielsen	148	2019/2020 season (100%)		148			
166	USA	Matthew Nielsen	148	2018/2019 season (100%)					
166	USA	Matthew Nielsen	148	2017/2018 season (70%)					
167	HKG	Leslie Man Cheuk Ip	144	2019/2020 season (100%)					
167	HKG	Leslie Man Cheuk Ip	144	2018/2019 season (100%)	92				
167	HKG	Leslie Man Cheuk Ip	144	2017/2018 season (70%)	52				
168	JPN	Kao Miura	133	2019/2020 season (100%)		133			
168	JPN	Kao Miura	133	2018/2019 season (100%)					
168	JPN	Kao Miura	133	2017/2018 season (70%)					
168	USA	Joseph Klein	133	2019/2020 season (100%)		133			
168	USA	Joseph Klein	133	2018/2019 season (100%)					
168	USA	Joseph Klein	133	2017/2018 season (70%)					
170	ITA	Adrien Bannister	127	2019/2020 season (100%)					
170	ITA	Adrien Bannister	127	2018/2019 season (100%)					
170	ITA	Adrien Bannister	127	2017/2018 season (70%)				127	
170	JPN	Jun Suzuki	127	2019/2020 season (100%)					
170	JPN	Jun Suzuki	127	2018/2019 season (100%)					
170	JPN	Jun Suzuki	127	2017/2018 season (70%)				127	
170	POL	Krzyszstof Gala	127	2019/2020 season (100%)					
170	POL	Krzyszstof Gala	127	2018/2019 season (100%)					
170	POL	Krzyszstof Gala	127	2017/2018 season (70%)				127	
173	SWE	Gabriel Folkesson	123	2019/2020 season (100%)					
173	SWE	Gabriel Folkesson	123	2018/2019 season (100%)					
173	SWE	Gabriel Folkesson	123	2017/2018 season (70%)	39	84			
174	CAN	Eric Liu	120	2019/2020 season (100%)		120			
174	CAN	Eric Liu	120	2018/2019 season (100%)					
174	CAN	Eric Liu	120	2017/2018 season (70%)					
174	CZE	Radek Jakubka	120	2019/2020 season (100%)					
174	CZE	Radek Jakubka	120	2018/2019 season (100%)		120			
174	CZE	Radek Jakubka	120	2017/2018 season (70%)					
176	FRA	Landry Le May	115	2019/2020 season (100%)					
176	FRA	Landry Le May	115	2018/2019 season (100%)					
176	FRA	Landry Le May	115	2017/2018 season (70%)				115	
176	POL	Lukas Kedzierski	115	2019/2020 season (100%)					
176	POL	Lukas Kedzierski	115	2018/2019 season (100%)					
176	POL	Lukas Kedzierski	115	2017/2018 season (70%)				115	
176	SVK	Marco Klepoch	115	2019/2020 season (100%)					
176	SVK	Marco Klepoch	115	2018/2019 season (100%)					
176	SVK	Marco Klepoch	115	2017/2018 season (70%)				115	
176	SWE	Illya Solomin	115	2019/2020 season (100%)					
176	SWE	Illya Solomin	115	2018/2019 season (100%)					
176	SWE	Illya Solomin	115	2017/2018 season (70%)				115	
176	TUR	Engin Ali Artan	115	2019/2020 season (100%)					
176	TUR	Engin Ali Artan	115	2018/2019 season (100%)					
176	TUR	Engin Ali Artan	115	2017/2018 season (70%)				115	
181	CHN	Li Luanfeng	108	2019/2020 season (100%)		108			
181	CHN	Li Luanfeng	108	2018/2019 season (100%)					
181	CHN	Li Luanfeng	108	2017/2018 season (70%)					
181	GBR	Edward Appleby	108	2019/2020 season (100%)		108			
181	GBR	Edward Appleby	108	2018/2019 season (100%)					
181	GBR	Edward Appleby	108	2017/2018 season (70%)					
183	PHI	Michael Christian Martinez	101	2019/2020 season (100%)					
183	PHI	Michael Christian Martinez	101	2018/2019 season (100%)					
183	PHI	Michael Christian Martinez	101	2017/2018 season (70%)				101	
184	CAN	Corey Circelli	97	2019/2020 season (100%)		97			
184	CAN	Corey Circelli	97	2018/2019 season (100%)					
184	CAN	Corey Circelli	97	2017/2018 season (70%)					
185	CHN	Fang Shuai	93	2019/2020 season (100%)					
185	CHN	Fang Shuai	93	2018/2019 season (100%)					
185	CHN	Fang Shuai	93	2017/2018 season (70%)		93			
186	USA	Eric Sjoberg	84	2019/2020 season (100%)					
186	USA	Eric Sjoberg	84	2018/2019 season (100%)					
186	USA	Eric Sjoberg	84	2017/2018 season (70%)		84			
187	GEO	Nika Egadze	83	2019/2020 season (100%)	83				
187	GEO	Nika Egadze	83	2018/2019 season (100%)					
187	GEO	Nika Egadze	83	2017/2018 season (70%)					
187	KAZ	Nikita Manko	83	2019/2020 season (100%)					
187	KAZ	Nikita Manko	83	2018/2019 season (100%)	83				
187	KAZ	Nikita Manko	83	2017/2018 season (70%)					
189	ESP	Felipe Montoya	79	2019/2020 season (100%)					
189	ESP	Felipe Montoya	79	2018/2019 season (100%)					
189	ESP	Felipe Montoya	79	2017/2018 season (70%)	79				
190	MAS	Chew Kai Xiang	76	2019/2020 season (100%)					
190	MAS	Chew Kai Xiang	76	2018/2019 season (100%)					
190	MAS	Chew Kai Xiang	76	2017/2018 season (70%)		76			
191	AUS	Jordan Dodds	74	2019/2020 season (100%)	74				
191	AUS	Jordan Dodds	74	2018/2019 season (100%)					
191	AUS	Jordan Dodds	74	2017/2018 season (70%)					
192	ITA	Nik Folini	68	2019/2020 season (100%)					
192	ITA	Nik Folini	68	2018/2019 season (100%)					
192	ITA	Nik Folini	68	2017/2018 season (70%)		68			
192	JPN	Taichiro Yamakuma	68	2019/2020 season (100%)					
192	JPN	Taichiro Yamakuma	68	2018/2019 season (100%)					
192	JPN	Taichiro Yamakuma	68	2017/2018 season (70%)		68			
194	KAZ	Mikhail Shaidorov	55	2019/2020 season (100%)	55				
194	KAZ	Mikhail Shaidorov	55	2018/2019 season (100%)					
194	KAZ	Mikhail Shaidorov	55	2017/2018 season (70%)					
195	CZE	Filip Scerba	44	2019/2020 season (100%)	44				
195	CZE	Filip Scerba	44	2018/2019 season (100%)					
195	CZE	Filip Scerba	44	2017/2018 season (70%)					
195	GER	Nikita Starostin	44	2019/2020 season (100%)					
195	GER	Nikita Starostin	44	2018/2019 season (100%)	44				
195	GER	Nikita Starostin	44	2017/2018 season (70%)					

==== Ladies' singles ====
As of March 7, 2020.

Rank	Nation	Skater	Points	Season	ISU Championships or Olympics	(Junior) Grand Prix and Final		Selected International Competition	
Rank	Nation	Skater	Points	Season	Best	Best	2nd Best	Best	2nd Best
1	JPN	Rika Kihira	4958	2019/2020 season (100%)	840	583	360	300	250
1	JPN	Rika Kihira	4958	2018/2019 season (100%)	875	800	400	300	250
1	JPN	Rika Kihira	4958	2017/2018 season (70%)	(167)	(179)	(158)		
2	RUS	Alina Zagitova	4702	2019/2020 season (100%)		472	(360)		
2	RUS	Alina Zagitova	4702	2018/2019 season (100%)	1200	720	400	300	
2	RUS	Alina Zagitova	4702	2017/2018 season (70%)	840	560	(280)	210	
3	JPN	Satoko Miyahara	4089	2019/2020 season (100%)		360	(292)	300	250
3	JPN	Satoko Miyahara	4089	2018/2019 season (100%)	709	472	400	300	250
3	JPN	Satoko Miyahara	4089	2017/2018 season (70%)	680	368	(280)		
4	USA	Bradie Tennell	3864	2019/2020 season (100%)	680	525	360	270	
4	USA	Bradie Tennell	3864	2018/2019 season (100%)	638	324	292	300	300
4	USA	Bradie Tennell	3864	2017/2018 season (70%)	(496)	(227)		175	(153)
5	RUS	Evgenia Medvedeva	3734	2019/2020 season (100%)		360	(262)	270	
5	RUS	Evgenia Medvedeva	3734	2018/2019 season (100%)	972	324	292	270	
5	RUS	Evgenia Medvedeva	3734	2017/2018 season (70%)	756	280	(280)	210	
6	JPN	Kaori Sakamoto	3724	2019/2020 season (100%)	(551)	292	292	270	
6	JPN	Kaori Sakamoto	3724	2018/2019 season (100%)	787	583	360	219	
6	JPN	Kaori Sakamoto	3724	2017/2018 season (70%)	588	(252)	(183)	175	158
7	RUS	Alena Kostornaia	3255	2019/2020 season (100%)	840	800	400	300	
7	RUS	Alena Kostornaia	3255	2018/2019 season (100%)		350	250		
7	RUS	Alena Kostornaia	3255	2017/2018 season (70%)	315	(221)	(175)		
8	JPN	Wakaba Higuchi	3187	2019/2020 season (100%)	612	236	236	(144)	
8	JPN	Wakaba Higuchi	3187	2018/2019 season (100%)		(236)		203	198
8	JPN	Wakaba Higuchi	3187	2017/2018 season (70%)	756	330	252	189	175
9	RUS	Anna Shcherbakova	3126	2019/2020 season (100%)	756	720	400	300	
9	RUS	Anna Shcherbakova	3126	2018/2019 season (100%)	450	250	250		
9	RUS	Anna Shcherbakova	3126	2017/2018 season (70%)					
10	KAZ	Elizabet Tursynbaeva	3108	2019/2020 season (100%)					
10	KAZ	Elizabet Tursynbaeva	3108	2018/2019 season (100%)	1080	262	236	270	270
10	KAZ	Elizabet Tursynbaeva	3108	2017/2018 season (70%)	293	183	134	210	170
11	RUS	Alexandra Trusova	3093	2019/2020 season (100%)	680	648	400	300	
11	RUS	Alexandra Trusova	3093	2018/2019 season (100%)	500	315	250		
11	RUS	Alexandra Trusova	3093	2017/2018 season (70%)	(345)	(245)	(175)		
12	KOR	Lim Eun-soo	3015	2019/2020 season (100%)	402	262	213	300	243
12	KOR	Lim Eun-soo	3015	2018/2019 season (100%)	465	324	236	300	270
12	KOR	Lim Eun-soo	3015	2017/2018 season (70%)	(230)	(158)	(127)		
13	RUS	Sofia Samodurova	3012	2019/2020 season (100%)		262	236	300	219
13	RUS	Sofia Samodurova	3012	2018/2019 season (100%)	840	525	360	270	
13	RUS	Sofia Samodurova	3012	2017/2018 season (70%)		(175)	(175)		
14	USA	Mariah Bell	3006	2019/2020 season (100%)		324	324	300	
14	USA	Mariah Bell	3006	2018/2019 season (100%)	517	292	262	243	219
14	USA	Mariah Bell	3006	2017/2018 season (70%)	386	(165)		139	
15	JPN	Mai Mihara	2903	2019/2020 season (100%)					
15	JPN	Mai Mihara	2903	2018/2019 season (100%)	680	360	292	270	
15	JPN	Mai Mihara	2903	2017/2018 season (70%)	529	204	204	189	175
16	RUS	Elizaveta Tuktamysheva	2866	2019/2020 season (100%)		324	324	300	270
16	RUS	Elizaveta Tuktamysheva	2866	2018/2019 season (100%)		648	400	300	300
16	RUS	Elizaveta Tuktamysheva	2866	2017/2018 season (70%)		(149)		(170)	(170)
17	KOR	You Young	2572	2019/2020 season (100%)	756	324	292	270	250
17	KOR	You Young	2572	2018/2019 season (100%)	295	203	182		
17	KOR	You Young	2572	2017/2018 season (70%)	(151)	(127)	(115)		
18	RUS	Stanislava Konstantinova	2514	2019/2020 season (100%)				(160)	
18	RUS	Stanislava Konstantinova	2514	2018/2019 season (100%)	612	360	262	243	219
18	RUS	Stanislava Konstantinova	2514	2017/2018 season (70%)	256	142		210	210
19	KOR	Kim Ye-lim	2420	2019/2020 season (100%)	496	213		270	219
19	KOR	Kim Ye-lim	2420	2018/2019 season (100%)	402	225	225	243	
19	KOR	Kim Ye-lim	2420	2017/2018 season (70%)		127	(104)		
20	SUI	Alexia Paganini	2386	2019/2020 season (100%)	612	213		178	
20	SUI	Alexia Paganini	2386	2018/2019 season (100%)	496	292		250	144
20	SUI	Alexia Paganini	2386	2017/2018 season (70%)	(312)			175	170
21	AZE	Ekaterina Ryabova	2289	2019/2020 season (100%)	496	262		243	225
21	AZE	Ekaterina Ryabova	2289	2018/2019 season (100%)	339	148	148	250	178
21	AZE	Ekaterina Ryabova	2289	2017/2018 season (70%)					
22	USA	Starr Andrews	2178	2019/2020 season (100%)	239	262	191	198	198
22	USA	Starr Andrews	2178	2018/2019 season (100%)		213		225	225
22	USA	Starr Andrews	2178	2017/2018 season (70%)	312	115		(125)	
23	JPN	Yuna Shiraiwa	1949	2019/2020 season (100%)					
23	JPN	Yuna Shiraiwa	1949	2018/2019 season (100%)	328	292	262	270	198
23	JPN	Yuna Shiraiwa	1949	2017/2018 season (70%)		165	134	158	142
24	JPN	Mako Yamashita	1941	2019/2020 season (100%)		262		178	
24	JPN	Mako Yamashita	1941	2018/2019 season (100%)		360	213	243	243
24	JPN	Mako Yamashita	1941	2017/2018 season (70%)	284	158	(142)		
25	FIN	Viveca Lindfors	1931	2019/2020 season (100%)					
25	FIN	Viveca Lindfors	1931	2018/2019 season (100%)	680	191		243	243
25	FIN	Viveca Lindfors	1931	2017/2018 season (70%)	173	68		175	158
26	USA	Karen Chen	1827	2019/2020 season (100%)	446	191		225	219
26	USA	Karen Chen	1827	2018/2019 season (100%)					
26	USA	Karen Chen	1827	2017/2018 season (70%)	293	149	134	170	
27	RUS	Maria Sotskova	1805	2019/2020 season (100%)					
27	RUS	Maria Sotskova	1805	2018/2019 season (100%)		213		198	
27	RUS	Maria Sotskova	1805	2017/2018 season (70%)	428	504	252	210	
28	FRA	Maé-Bérénice Méité	1801	2019/2020 season (100%)	362			160	
28	FRA	Maé-Bérénice Méité	1801	2018/2019 season (100%)	446	191		243	164
28	FRA	Maé-Bérénice Méité	1801	2017/2018 season (70%)	(281)	134		101	
29	GER	Nicole Schott	1782	2019/2020 season (100%)	237	213		243	243
29	GER	Nicole Schott	1782	2018/2019 season (100%)	247			225	225
29	GER	Nicole Schott	1782	2017/2018 season (70%)	(237)	149		(170)	(153)
30	JPN	Yuhana Yokoi	1769	2019/2020 season (100%)		292	236	243	225
30	JPN	Yuhana Yokoi	1769	2018/2019 season (100%)	215	203	148		
30	JPN	Yuhana Yokoi	1769	2017/2018 season (70%)	207	(115)			
31	FRA	Laurine Lecavelier	1736	2019/2020 season (100%)					
31	FRA	Laurine Lecavelier	1736	2018/2019 season (100%)	551	262		250	198
31	FRA	Laurine Lecavelier	1736	2017/2018 season (70%)	214	134		127	
32	FIN	Emmi Peltonen	1733	2019/2020 season (100%)	551			225	182
32	FIN	Emmi Peltonen	1733	2018/2019 season (100%)	402			198	
32	FIN	Emmi Peltonen	1733	2017/2018 season (70%)	(253)			175	(127)
33	JPN	Marin Honda	1687	2019/2020 season (100%)		236	213	225	198
33	JPN	Marin Honda	1687	2018/2019 season (100%)		236	191	178	
33	JPN	Marin Honda	1687	2017/2018 season (70%)		(183)	(183)	210	142
34	ITA	Carolina Kostner	1632	2019/2020 season (100%)					
34	ITA	Carolina Kostner	1632	2018/2019 season (100%)					
34	ITA	Carolina Kostner	1632	2017/2018 season (70%)	613	408	252	189	170
34	KOR	Kim Ha-nul	1632	2019/2020 season (100%)				270	270
34	KOR	Kim Ha-nul	1632	2018/2019 season (100%)	237	213			
34	KOR	Kim Ha-nul	1632	2017/2018 season (70%)	347			142	112
36	BUL	Alexandra Feigin	1569	2019/2020 season (100%)	156			250	250
36	BUL	Alexandra Feigin	1569	2018/2019 season (100%)	293	120		250	250
36	BUL	Alexandra Feigin	1569	2017/2018 season (70%)	(80)				
36	HKG	Yi Christy Leung	1569	2019/2020 season (100%)		191		198	
36	HKG	Yi Christy Leung	1569	2018/2019 season (100%)	305	182	133	219	219
36	HKG	Yi Christy Leung	1569	2017/2018 season (70%)	122				
38	USA	Amber Glenn	1529	2019/2020 season (100%)	362	236	213	243	
38	USA	Amber Glenn	1529	2018/2019 season (100%)				182	178
38	USA	Amber Glenn	1529	2017/2018 season (70%)				115	(101)
39	BEL	Loena Hendrickx	1502	2019/2020 season (100%)					
39	BEL	Loena Hendrickx	1502	2018/2019 season (100%)	377	262		243	
39	BEL	Loena Hendrickx	1502	2017/2018 season (70%)	386	76		158	
40	CAN	Gabrielle Daleman	1498	2019/2020 season (100%)					
40	CAN	Gabrielle Daleman	1498	2018/2019 season (100%)	418			178	
40	CAN	Gabrielle Daleman	1498	2017/2018 season (70%)	447	165	165	125	
41	EST	Eva-Lotta Kiibus	1483	2019/2020 season (100%)	446	133	120	225	178
41	EST	Eva-Lotta Kiibus	1483	2018/2019 season (100%)	131			250	
41	EST	Eva-Lotta Kiibus	1483	2017/2018 season (70%)					
42	USA	Ting Cui	1481	2019/2020 season (100%)				219	
42	USA	Ting Cui	1481	2018/2019 season (100%)	405	164	133	270	
42	USA	Ting Cui	1481	2017/2018 season (70%)	186	104			
43	KOR	Lee Hae-in	1452	2019/2020 season (100%)	328	250	250		
43	KOR	Lee Hae-in	1452	2018/2019 season (100%)	239	203	182		
43	KOR	Lee Hae-in	1452	2017/2018 season (70%)					
44	RUS	Serafima Sakhanovich	1413	2019/2020 season (100%)		191		250	219
44	RUS	Serafima Sakhanovich	1413	2018/2019 season (100%)				300	270
44	RUS	Serafima Sakhanovich	1413	2017/2018 season (70%)		183		(210)	(189)
45	CZE	Eliška Březinová	1348	2019/2020 season (100%)	(92)			203	182
45	CZE	Eliška Březinová	1348	2018/2019 season (100%)	325			250	203
45	CZE	Eliška Březinová	1348	2017/2018 season (70%)	185			(175)	(158)
46	AUS	Kailani Craine	1329	2019/2020 season (100%)	264			219	(198)
46	AUS	Kailani Craine	1329	2018/2019 season (100%)	192			225	219
46	AUS	Kailani Craine	1329	2017/2018 season (70%)	(155)			210	(158)
47	HUN	Ivett Tóth	1260	2019/2020 season (100%)	(102)			182	(144)
47	HUN	Ivett Tóth	1260	2018/2019 season (100%)	237			250	250
47	HUN	Ivett Tóth	1260	2017/2018 season (70%)	166			175	
48	CHN	Chen Hongyi	1224	2019/2020 season (100%)	293	191			
48	CHN	Chen Hongyi	1224	2018/2019 season (100%)	214	120		178	160
48	CHN	Chen Hongyi	1224	2017/2018 season (70%)	(58)	68			
49	GEO	Alina Urushadze	1210	2019/2020 season (100%)	192	148	120	225	203
49	GEO	Alina Urushadze	1210	2018/2019 season (100%)	174	148			
49	GEO	Alina Urushadze	1210	2017/2018 season (70%)					
50	ITA	Alessia Tornaghi	1182	2019/2020 season (100%)	402	203	108	250	219
50	ITA	Alessia Tornaghi	1182	2018/2019 season (100%)					
50	ITA	Alessia Tornaghi	1182	2017/2018 season (70%)					
51	POL	Ekaterina Kurakova	1172	2019/2020 season (100%)	325	164	133	300	250
51	POL	Ekaterina Kurakova	1172	2018/2019 season (100%)					
51	POL	Ekaterina Kurakova	1172	2017/2018 season (70%)					
52	ITA	Lara Naki Gutmann	1145	2019/2020 season (100%)		148	133	250	225
52	ITA	Lara Naki Gutmann	1145	2018/2019 season (100%)				225	164
52	ITA	Lara Naki Gutmann	1145	2017/2018 season (70%)					
53	SWE	Anita Östlund	1140	2019/2020 season (100%)	140			144	
53	SWE	Anita Östlund	1140	2018/2019 season (100%)	140			225	164
53	SWE	Anita Östlund	1140	2017/2018 season (70%)	(109)	93	76	158	(139)
54	RUS	Anastasiia Guliakova	1133	2019/2020 season (100%)				250	225
54	RUS	Anastasiia Guliakova	1133	2018/2019 season (100%)				250	250
54	RUS	Anastasiia Guliakova	1133	2017/2018 season (70%)		158			
55	SVK	Nicole Rajičová	1130	2019/2020 season (100%)					
55	SVK	Nicole Rajičová	1130	2018/2019 season (100%)	362			182	
55	SVK	Nicole Rajičová	1130	2017/2018 season (70%)	347			127	112
56	SUI	Yasmine Kimiko Yamada	1118	2019/2020 season (100%)	126			203	203
56	SUI	Yasmine Kimiko Yamada	1118	2018/2019 season (100%)	192			250	144
56	SUI	Yasmine Kimiko Yamada	1118	2017/2018 season (70%)				(115)	
57	RUS	Kamila Valieva	1100	2019/2020 season (100%)	500	350	250		
57	RUS	Kamila Valieva	1100	2018/2019 season (100%)					
57	RUS	Kamila Valieva	1100	2017/2018 season (70%)					
58	SLO	Daša Grm	1098	2019/2020 season (100%)	113			225	203
58	SLO	Daša Grm	1098	2018/2019 season (100%)	200			182	(164)
58	SLO	Daša Grm	1098	2017/2018 season (70%)	(92)			175	(158)
59	RUS	Ksenia Sinitsyna	1073	2019/2020 season (100%)		255	250		
59	RUS	Ksenia Sinitsyna	1073	2018/2019 season (100%)	365	203			
59	RUS	Ksenia Sinitsyna	1073	2017/2018 season (70%)					
60	KOR	Wi Seo-yeong	1066	2019/2020 season (100%)	295	225	182		
60	KOR	Wi Seo-yeong	1066	2018/2019 season (100%)		182	182		
60	KOR	Wi Seo-yeong	1066	2017/2018 season (70%)					
61	GBR	Natasha McKay	1065	2019/2020 season (100%)	83			225	203
61	GBR	Natasha McKay	1065	2018/2019 season (100%)	146			250	
61	GBR	Natasha McKay	1065	2017/2018 season (70%)				158	(142)
62	RUS	Polina Tsurskaya	1054	2019/2020 season (100%)					
62	RUS	Polina Tsurskaya	1054	2018/2019 season (100%)		213	191	219	
62	RUS	Polina Tsurskaya	1054	2017/2018 season (70%)		227	204		
63	ITA	Lucrezia Gennaro	1038	2019/2020 season (100%)		108	97		
63	ITA	Lucrezia Gennaro	1038	2018/2019 season (100%)	126			225	225
63	ITA	Lucrezia Gennaro	1038	2017/2018 season (70%)				142	115
64	USA	Gabriella Izzo	977	2019/2020 season (100%)		120	108	243	
64	USA	Gabriella Izzo	977	2018/2019 season (100%)		148	108	250	
64	USA	Gabriella Izzo	977	2017/2018 season (70%)					
65	USA	Alysa Liu	970	2019/2020 season (100%)	405	315	250		
65	USA	Alysa Liu	970	2018/2019 season (100%)					
65	USA	Alysa Liu	970	2017/2018 season (70%)					
66	RUS	Daria Usacheva	959	2019/2020 season (100%)	450	284	225		
66	RUS	Daria Usacheva	959	2018/2019 season (100%)					
66	RUS	Daria Usacheva	959	2017/2018 season (70%)					
67	CAN	Alicia Pineault	954	2019/2020 season (100%)	325			160	
67	CAN	Alicia Pineault	954	2018/2019 season (100%)				178	
67	CAN	Alicia Pineault	954	2017/2018 season (70%)	166			125	
67	CAN	Alison Schumacher	954	2019/2020 season (100%)	215	133		144	
67	CAN	Alison Schumacher	954	2018/2019 season (100%)	194	108			
67	CAN	Alison Schumacher	954	2017/2018 season (70%)		84	76		
69	FIN	Linnea Ceder	950	2019/2020 season (100%)	264	120		203	160
69	FIN	Linnea Ceder	950	2018/2019 season (100%)				203	
69	FIN	Linnea Ceder	950	2017/2018 season (70%)					
70	KOR	Choi Da-bin	942	2019/2020 season (100%)				182	160
70	KOR	Choi Da-bin	942	2018/2019 season (100%)					
70	KOR	Choi Da-bin	942	2017/2018 season (70%)	447			153	
71	BRA	Isadora Williams	941	2019/2020 season (100%)				164	
71	BRA	Isadora Williams	941	2018/2019 season (100%)	156			225	164
71	BRA	Isadora Williams	941	2017/2018 season (70%)	74			158	(139)
72	JPN	Tomoe Kawabata	940	2019/2020 season (100%)	127	164	164		
72	JPN	Tomoe Kawabata	940	2018/2019 season (100%)	157	164	164		
72	JPN	Tomoe Kawabata	940	2017/2018 season (70%)					
73	ARM	Anastasia Galustyan	930	2019/2020 season (100%)				250	203
73	ARM	Anastasia Galustyan	930	2018/2019 season (100%)	92			203	182
73	ARM	Anastasia Galustyan	930	2017/2018 season (70%)				(101)	
74	CAN	Alaine Chartrand	928	2019/2020 season (100%)					
74	CAN	Alaine Chartrand	928	2018/2019 season (100%)	173	191		144	
74	CAN	Alaine Chartrand	928	2017/2018 season (70%)	281			139	
75	FRA	Léa Serna	911	2019/2020 season (100%)	173	191			
75	FRA	Léa Serna	911	2018/2019 season (100%)				225	164
75	FRA	Léa Serna	911	2017/2018 season (70%)				158	
75	RUS	Anastasia Tarakanova	911	2019/2020 season (100%)		203	203		
75	RUS	Anastasia Tarakanova	911	2018/2019 season (100%)		255	250		
75	RUS	Anastasia Tarakanova	911	2017/2018 season (70%)		(199)	(175)		
77	ITA	Lucrezia Beccari	901	2019/2020 season (100%)				250	250
77	ITA	Lucrezia Beccari	901	2018/2019 season (100%)	103	133			
77	ITA	Lucrezia Beccari	901	2017/2018 season (70%)	72	93			
78	FIN	Jenni Saarinen	897	2019/2020 season (100%)				219	203
78	FIN	Jenni Saarinen	897	2018/2019 season (100%)				250	225
78	FIN	Jenni Saarinen	897	2017/2018 season (70%)				(127)	
79	USA	Courtney Hicks	878	2019/2020 season (100%)					
79	USA	Courtney Hicks	878	2018/2019 season (100%)		191		160	
79	USA	Courtney Hicks	878	2017/2018 season (70%)		204		170	153
80	ROU	Julia Sauter	860	2019/2020 season (100%)					
80	ROU	Julia Sauter	860	2018/2019 season (100%)	214			225	164
80	ROU	Julia Sauter	860	2017/2018 season (70%)				142	115
81	USA	Hanna Harrell	828	2019/2020 season (100%)		133		203	
81	USA	Hanna Harrell	828	2018/2019 season (100%)	266	133			
81	USA	Hanna Harrell	828	2017/2018 season (70%)		93			
82	RUS	Alena Leonova	805	2019/2020 season (100%)					
82	RUS	Alena Leonova	805	2018/2019 season (100%)		213			
82	RUS	Alena Leonova	805	2017/2018 season (70%)		165	149	139	139
83	HUN	Júlia Láng	796	2019/2020 season (100%)		97		250	225
83	HUN	Júlia Láng	796	2018/2019 season (100%)	127	97			
83	HUN	Júlia Láng	796	2017/2018 season (70%)					
84	ITA	Chenny Paolucci	791	2019/2020 season (100%)				203	182
84	ITA	Chenny Paolucci	791	2018/2019 season (100%)				203	203
84	ITA	Chenny Paolucci	791	2017/2018 season (70%)				(115)	(115)
85	ITA	Elisabetta Leccardi	774	2019/2020 season (100%)					
85	ITA	Elisabetta Leccardi	774	2018/2019 season (100%)				203	
85	ITA	Elisabetta Leccardi	774	2017/2018 season (70%)	102	68	68	175	158
86	RUS	Daria Panenkova	770	2019/2020 season (100%)					
86	RUS	Daria Panenkova	770	2018/2019 season (100%)		236		198	
86	RUS	Daria Panenkova	770	2017/2018 season (70%)		175	161		
87	EST	Gerli Liinamäe	764	2019/2020 season (100%)				182	
87	EST	Gerli Liinamäe	764	2018/2019 season (100%)				225	182
87	EST	Gerli Liinamäe	764	2017/2018 season (70%)				175	
88	PHI	Alisson Krystle Perticheto	755	2019/2020 season (100%)	140				
88	PHI	Alisson Krystle Perticheto	755	2018/2019 season (100%)	140			250	225
88	PHI	Alisson Krystle Perticheto	755	2017/2018 season (70%)					
89	SWE	Josefin Taljegård	752	2019/2020 season (100%)				178	
89	SWE	Josefin Taljegård	752	2018/2019 season (100%)				250	182
89	SWE	Josefin Taljegård	752	2017/2018 season (70%)				142	(115)
90	RUS	Maiia Khromykh	750	2019/2020 season (100%)	365	203	182		
90	RUS	Maiia Khromykh	750	2018/2019 season (100%)					
90	RUS	Maiia Khromykh	750	2017/2018 season (70%)					
90	RUS	Anna Tarusina	750	2019/2020 season (100%)					
90	RUS	Anna Tarusina	750	2018/2019 season (100%)		225	225	300	
90	RUS	Anna Tarusina	750	2017/2018 season (70%)					
92	ITA	Elettra Maria Olivotto	747	2019/2020 season (100%)				182	
92	ITA	Elettra Maria Olivotto	747	2018/2019 season (100%)				225	182
92	ITA	Elettra Maria Olivotto	747	2017/2018 season (70%)				158	
93	AUT	Olga Mikutina	740	2019/2020 season (100%)	74			250	225
93	AUT	Olga Mikutina	740	2018/2019 season (100%)	83	108			
93	AUT	Olga Mikutina	740	2017/2018 season (70%)					
94	SRB	Antonina Dubinina	735	2019/2020 season (100%)				182	
94	SRB	Antonina Dubinina	735	2018/2019 season (100%)	74			182	182
94	SRB	Antonina Dubinina	735	2017/2018 season (70%)				115	(115)
95	BLR	Viktoriia Safonova	734	2019/2020 season (100%)	214			270	250
95	BLR	Viktoriia Safonova	734	2018/2019 season (100%)					
95	BLR	Viktoriia Safonova	734	2017/2018 season (70%)					
96	AUT	Sophia Schaller	724	2019/2020 season (100%)				203	164
96	AUT	Sophia Schaller	724	2018/2019 season (100%)				182	(164)
96	AUT	Sophia Schaller	724	2017/2018 season (70%)				175	
97	AZE	Morgan Flood	722	2019/2020 season (100%)					
97	AZE	Morgan Flood	722	2018/2019 season (100%)				203	203
97	AZE	Morgan Flood	722	2017/2018 season (70%)				158	158
98	USA	Mirai Nagasu	719	2019/2020 season (100%)					
98	USA	Mirai Nagasu	719	2018/2019 season (100%)					
98	USA	Mirai Nagasu	719	2017/2018 season (70%)	326	204		189	
99	USA	Angela Wang	708	2019/2020 season (100%)					
99	USA	Angela Wang	708	2018/2019 season (100%)				144	
99	USA	Angela Wang	708	2017/2018 season (70%)	253			158	153
100	USA	Megan Wessenberg	704	2019/2020 season (100%)				164	144
100	USA	Megan Wessenberg	704	2018/2019 season (100%)		236		160	
100	USA	Megan Wessenberg	704	2017/2018 season (70%)					
101	JPN	Nana Araki	692	2019/2020 season (100%)		182	182		
101	JPN	Nana Araki	692	2018/2019 season (100%)		164	164		
101	JPN	Nana Araki	692	2017/2018 season (70%)		(158)	(127)		
102	GBR	Karly Robertson	676	2019/2020 season (100%)				164	
102	GBR	Karly Robertson	676	2018/2019 season (100%)				225	160
102	GBR	Karly Robertson	676	2017/2018 season (70%)				127	
103	FRA	Maïa Mazzara	662	2019/2020 season (100%)	293	108		164	
103	FRA	Maïa Mazzara	662	2018/2019 season (100%)		97			
103	FRA	Maïa Mazzara	662	2017/2018 season (70%)					
104	JPN	Rika Hongo	661	2019/2020 season (100%)					
104	JPN	Rika Hongo	661	2018/2019 season (100%)					
104	JPN	Rika Hongo	661	2017/2018 season (70%)		165	149	189	158
105	SWE	Matilda Algotsson	639	2019/2020 season (100%)				144	
105	SWE	Matilda Algotsson	639	2018/2019 season (100%)				164	
105	SWE	Matilda Algotsson	639	2017/2018 season (70%)				189	142
106	RUS	Viktoria Vasilieva	635	2019/2020 season (100%)		225	207		
106	RUS	Viktoria Vasilieva	635	2018/2019 season (100%)		203			
106	RUS	Viktoria Vasilieva	635	2017/2018 season (70%)					
107	ITA	Micol Cristini	628	2019/2020 season (100%)					
107	ITA	Micol Cristini	628	2018/2019 season (100%)				144	
107	ITA	Micol Cristini	628	2017/2018 season (70%)	134			175	175
108	AUS	Brooklee Han	617	2019/2020 season (100%)					
108	AUS	Brooklee Han	617	2018/2019 season (100%)				243	
108	AUS	Brooklee Han	617	2017/2018 season (70%)	150			112	112
109	RUS	Anastasiia Gubanova	616	2019/2020 season (100%)					
109	RUS	Anastasiia Gubanova	616	2018/2019 season (100%)				270	219
109	RUS	Anastasiia Gubanova	616	2017/2018 season (70%)		127			
110	ITA	Marina Piredda	613	2019/2020 season (100%)				160	
110	ITA	Marina Piredda	613	2018/2019 season (100%)				250	203
110	ITA	Marina Piredda	613	2017/2018 season (70%)					
111	GER	Nathalie Weinzierl	612	2019/2020 season (100%)					
111	GER	Nathalie Weinzierl	612	2018/2019 season (100%)	102			160	
111	GER	Nathalie Weinzierl	612	2017/2018 season (70%)				175	175
112	ITA	Roberta Rodeghiero	610	2019/2020 season (100%)				250	
112	ITA	Roberta Rodeghiero	610	2018/2019 season (100%)				182	178
112	ITA	Roberta Rodeghiero	610	2017/2018 season (70%)					
113	RUS	Elena Radionova	601	2019/2020 season (100%)					
113	RUS	Elena Radionova	601	2018/2019 season (100%)					
113	RUS	Elena Radionova	601	2017/2018 season (70%)		227	204	170	
114	NED	Niki Wories	581	2019/2020 season (100%)				203	
114	NED	Niki Wories	581	2018/2019 season (100%)				203	
114	NED	Niki Wories	581	2017/2018 season (70%)				175	
115	GER	Lea Johanna Dastich	561	2019/2020 season (100%)					
115	GER	Lea Johanna Dastich	561	2018/2019 season (100%)					
115	GER	Lea Johanna Dastich	561	2017/2018 season (70%)	136	104	84	125	112
116	UKR	Anastasiia Arkhipova	560	2019/2020 season (100%)					
116	UKR	Anastasiia Arkhipova	560	2018/2019 season (100%)	93	182			
116	UKR	Anastasiia Arkhipova	560	2017/2018 season (70%)	99	93	93		
117	GBR	Kristen Spours	556	2019/2020 season (100%)					
117	GBR	Kristen Spours	556	2018/2019 season (100%)	68			203	
117	GBR	Kristen Spours	556	2017/2018 season (70%)	43			127	115
118	SGP	Chloe Ing	554	2019/2020 season (100%)				182	
118	SGP	Chloe Ing	554	2018/2019 season (100%)					
118	SGP	Chloe Ing	554	2017/2018 season (70%)	88			142	142
119	KAZ	Aiza Mambekova	548	2019/2020 season (100%)	102				
119	KAZ	Aiza Mambekova	548	2018/2019 season (100%)				225	
119	KAZ	Aiza Mambekova	548	2017/2018 season (70%)	79			142	
120	CAN	Véronik Mallet	540	2019/2020 season (100%)					
120	CAN	Véronik Mallet	540	2018/2019 season (100%)	362			178	
120	CAN	Véronik Mallet	540	2017/2018 season (70%)					
121	ITA	Sara Conti	521	2019/2020 season (100%)					
121	ITA	Sara Conti	521	2018/2019 season (100%)				203	203
121	ITA	Sara Conti	521	2017/2018 season (70%)				115	
121	USA	Ashley Lin	521	2019/2020 season (100%)					
121	USA	Ashley Lin	521	2018/2019 season (100%)				219	198
121	USA	Ashley Lin	521	2017/2018 season (70%)		104			
123	CHN	Li Xiangning	520	2019/2020 season (100%)					
123	CHN	Li Xiangning	520	2018/2019 season (100%)					
123	CHN	Li Xiangning	520	2017/2018 season (70%)	228	134		158	
124	JPN	Mana Kawabe	520	2019/2020 season (100%)	174	182	164		
124	JPN	Mana Kawabe	520	2018/2019 season (100%)					
124	JPN	Mana Kawabe	520	2017/2018 season (70%)					
125	CAN	Emily Bausback	518	2019/2020 season (100%)	192	148		178	
125	CAN	Emily Bausback	518	2018/2019 season (100%)					
125	CAN	Emily Bausback	518	2017/2018 season (70%)					
126	LTU	Greta Morkytė	510	2019/2020 season (100%)				182	164
126	LTU	Greta Morkytė	510	2018/2019 season (100%)				164	
126	LTU	Greta Morkytė	510	2017/2018 season (70%)					
126	TUR	Sinem Kuyucu	510	2019/2020 season (100%)				164	
126	TUR	Sinem Kuyucu	510	2018/2019 season (100%)				182	164
126	TUR	Sinem Kuyucu	510	2017/2018 season (70%)					
128	RUS	Alena Kanysheva	509	2019/2020 season (100%)					
128	RUS	Alena Kanysheva	509	2018/2019 season (100%)		284	225		
128	RUS	Alena Kanysheva	509	2017/2018 season (70%)					
129	JPN	Rion Sumiyoshi	505	2019/2020 season (100%)		120			
129	JPN	Rion Sumiyoshi	505	2018/2019 season (100%)		203	182		
129	JPN	Rion Sumiyoshi	505	2017/2018 season (70%)					
129	RUS	Alisa Fedichkina	505	2019/2020 season (100%)					
129	RUS	Alisa Fedichkina	505	2018/2019 season (100%)					
129	RUS	Alisa Fedichkina	505	2017/2018 season (70%)		127		189	189
131	FIN	Vera Stolt	503	2019/2020 season (100%)					
131	FIN	Vera Stolt	503	2018/2019 season (100%)		97		203	203
131	FIN	Vera Stolt	503	2017/2018 season (70%)					
132	BUL	Maria Levushkina	484	2019/2020 season (100%)	49	133	108		
132	BUL	Maria Levushkina	484	2018/2019 season (100%)		97	97		
132	BUL	Maria Levushkina	484	2017/2018 season (70%)					
132	MEX	Andrea Montesinos Cantú	484	2019/2020 season (100%)	173			198	
132	MEX	Andrea Montesinos Cantú	484	2018/2019 season (100%)	113				
132	MEX	Andrea Montesinos Cantú	484	2017/2018 season (70%)					
134	GBR	Nina Povey	477	2019/2020 season (100%)					
134	GBR	Nina Povey	477	2018/2019 season (100%)				182	
134	GBR	Nina Povey	477	2017/2018 season (70%)				153	142
135	AUT	Stefanie Pesendorfer	474	2019/2020 season (100%)	114			250	
135	AUT	Stefanie Pesendorfer	474	2018/2019 season (100%)					
135	AUT	Stefanie Pesendorfer	474	2017/2018 season (70%)	110				
136	USA	Emmy Ma	449	2019/2020 season (100%)					
136	USA	Emmy Ma	449	2018/2019 season (100%)					
136	USA	Emmy Ma	449	2017/2018 season (70%)	53	142	115	139	
137	USA	Katie McBeath	448	2019/2020 season (100%)					
137	USA	Katie McBeath	448	2018/2019 season (100%)				250	198
137	USA	Katie McBeath	448	2017/2018 season (70%)					
138	ITA	Giada Russo	438	2019/2020 season (100%)					
138	ITA	Giada Russo	438	2018/2019 season (100%)					
138	ITA	Giada Russo	438	2017/2018 season (70%)	88			175	175
139	CAN	Aurora Cotop	437	2019/2020 season (100%)					
139	CAN	Aurora Cotop	437	2018/2019 season (100%)				203	
139	CAN	Aurora Cotop	437	2017/2018 season (70%)	65	93	76		
140	DEN	Pernille Sørensen	429	2019/2020 season (100%)					
140	DEN	Pernille Sørensen	429	2018/2019 season (100%)	83			160	
140	DEN	Pernille Sørensen	429	2017/2018 season (70%)	71			115	
141	POL	Elżbieta Gabryszak	428	2019/2020 season (100%)				225	
141	POL	Elżbieta Gabryszak	428	2018/2019 season (100%)				203	
141	POL	Elżbieta Gabryszak	428	2017/2018 season (70%)					
141	RUS	Anna Frolova	428	2019/2020 season (100%)		225	203		
141	RUS	Anna Frolova	428	2018/2019 season (100%)					
141	RUS	Anna Frolova	428	2017/2018 season (70%)					
143	KOR	To Ji-hun	405	2019/2020 season (100%)		108			
143	KOR	To Ji-hun	405	2018/2019 season (100%)		164	133		
143	KOR	To Ji-hun	405	2017/2018 season (70%)					
144	SWE	Selma Ihr	405	2019/2020 season (100%)					
144	SWE	Selma Ihr	405	2018/2019 season (100%)		120	120		
144	SWE	Selma Ihr	405	2017/2018 season (70%)	89	76			
145	TPE	Amy Lin	399	2019/2020 season (100%)	113				
145	TPE	Amy Lin	399	2018/2019 season (100%)	126			160	
145	TPE	Amy Lin	399	2017/2018 season (70%)	(98)				
146	JPN	Riko Takino	390	2019/2020 season (100%)					
146	JPN	Riko Takino	390	2018/2019 season (100%)		133			
146	JPN	Riko Takino	390	2017/2018 season (70%)		142	115		
147	KOR	Park Yeon-jeong	389	2019/2020 season (100%)		225	164		
147	KOR	Park Yeon-jeong	389	2018/2019 season (100%)					
147	KOR	Park Yeon-jeong	389	2017/2018 season (70%)					
148	RUS	Anastasia Kolomiets	389	2019/2020 season (100%)				164	
148	RUS	Anastasia Kolomiets	389	2018/2019 season (100%)				225	
148	RUS	Anastasia Kolomiets	389	2017/2018 season (70%)					
149	FRA	Anna Kuzmenko	382	2019/2020 season (100%)					
149	FRA	Anna Kuzmenko	382	2018/2019 season (100%)	114	148	120		
149	FRA	Anna Kuzmenko	382	2017/2018 season (70%)					
150	LAT	Angelīna Kučvaļska	380	2019/2020 season (100%)				198	182
150	LAT	Angelīna Kučvaļska	380	2018/2019 season (100%)					
150	LAT	Angelīna Kučvaļska	380	2017/2018 season (70%)					
151	CAN	Michelle Long	379	2019/2020 season (100%)				144	
151	CAN	Michelle Long	379	2018/2019 season (100%)					
151	CAN	Michelle Long	379	2017/2018 season (70%)	134			101	
152	USA	Akari Nakahara	369	2019/2020 season (100%)					
152	USA	Akari Nakahara	369	2018/2019 season (100%)				225	144
152	USA	Akari Nakahara	369	2017/2018 season (70%)					
153	ISR	Alina Iushchenkova	367	2019/2020 season (100%)				203	
153	ISR	Alina Iushchenkova	367	2018/2019 season (100%)				164	
153	ISR	Alina Iushchenkova	367	2017/2018 season (70%)					
154	FIN	Laura Karhunen	364	2019/2020 season (100%)				182	
154	FIN	Laura Karhunen	364	2018/2019 season (100%)				182	
154	FIN	Laura Karhunen	364	2017/2018 season (70%)					
154	POL	Oliwia Rzepiel	364	2019/2020 season (100%)				198	182
154	POL	Oliwia Rzepiel	364	2018/2019 season (100%)				182	182
154	POL	Oliwia Rzepiel	364	2017/2018 season (70%)					
154	SUI	Shaline Rüegger	364	2019/2020 season (100%)					
154	SUI	Shaline Rüegger	364	2018/2019 season (100%)				182	182
154	SUI	Shaline Rüegger	364	2017/2018 season (70%)					
157	JPN	Yuna Aoki	358	2019/2020 season (100%)					
157	JPN	Yuna Aoki	358	2018/2019 season (100%)		133		225	
157	JPN	Yuna Aoki	358	2017/2018 season (70%)					
158	JPN	Shiika Yoshioka	351	2019/2020 season (100%)					
158	JPN	Shiika Yoshioka	351	2018/2019 season (100%)		203	148		
158	JPN	Shiika Yoshioka	351	2017/2018 season (70%)					
159	KOR	Park So-youn	349	2019/2020 season (100%)					
159	KOR	Park So-youn	349	2018/2019 season (100%)				144	
159	KOR	Park So-youn	349	2017/2018 season (70%)	205				
160	NOR	Marianne Stalen	346	2019/2020 season (100%)				164	
160	NOR	Marianne Stalen	346	2018/2019 season (100%)				182	
160	NOR	Marianne Stalen	346	2017/2018 season (70%)					
161	KOR	Choi Yu-jin	338	2019/2020 season (100%)					
161	KOR	Choi Yu-jin	338	2018/2019 season (100%)				178	160
161	KOR	Choi Yu-jin	338	2017/2018 season (70%)					
162	LAT	Diāna Ņikitina	333	2019/2020 season (100%)					
162	LAT	Diāna Ņikitina	333	2018/2019 season (100%)					
162	LAT	Diāna Ņikitina	333	2017/2018 season (70%)				175	158
162	NED	Caya Scheepens	333	2019/2020 season (100%)					
162	NED	Caya Scheepens	333	2018/2019 season (100%)		108		225	
162	NED	Caya Scheepens	333	2017/2018 season (70%)					
164	KOR	Ji Seo-yeon	330	2019/2020 season (100%)		182	148		
164	KOR	Ji Seo-yeon	330	2018/2019 season (100%)					
164	KOR	Ji Seo-yeon	330	2017/2018 season (70%)					
165	JPN	Chisato Uramatsu	328	2019/2020 season (100%)		164	164		
165	JPN	Chisato Uramatsu	328	2018/2019 season (100%)					
165	JPN	Chisato Uramatsu	328	2017/2018 season (70%)					
166	AUT	Kerstin Frank	316	2019/2020 season (100%)					
166	AUT	Kerstin Frank	316	2018/2019 season (100%)					
166	AUT	Kerstin Frank	316	2017/2018 season (70%)				158	158
167	EST	Kristina Shkuleta-Gromova	316	2019/2020 season (100%)				164	
167	EST	Kristina Shkuleta-Gromova	316	2018/2019 season (100%)					
167	EST	Kristina Shkuleta-Gromova	316	2017/2018 season (70%)		84	68		
168	ISR	Taylor Morris	308	2019/2020 season (100%)				164	144
168	ISR	Taylor Morris	308	2018/2019 season (100%)					
168	ISR	Taylor Morris	308	2017/2018 season (70%)					
169	ITA	Anna Memola	306	2019/2020 season (100%)					
169	ITA	Anna Memola	306	2018/2019 season (100%)				164	
169	ITA	Anna Memola	306	2017/2018 season (70%)				142	
170	HKG	Hiu Ching Kwong	304	2019/2020 season (100%)				160	
170	HKG	Hiu Ching Kwong	304	2018/2019 season (100%)				144	
170	HKG	Hiu Ching Kwong	304	2017/2018 season (70%)					
171	JPN	Rin Nitaya	300	2019/2020 season (100%)					
171	JPN	Rin Nitaya	300	2018/2019 season (100%)					
171	JPN	Rin Nitaya	300	2017/2018 season (70%)				175	125
172	JPN	Yura Matsuda	297	2019/2020 season (100%)					
172	JPN	Yura Matsuda	297	2018/2019 season (100%)					
172	JPN	Yura Matsuda	297	2017/2018 season (70%)				158	139
172	KOR	An So-hyun	297	2019/2020 season (100%)					
172	KOR	An So-hyun	297	2018/2019 season (100%)					
172	KOR	An So-hyun	297	2017/2018 season (70%)				170	127
174	NED	Kyarha van Tiel	281	2019/2020 season (100%)				250	
174	NED	Kyarha van Tiel	281	2018/2019 season (100%)					
174	NED	Kyarha van Tiel	281	2017/2018 season (70%)	31				
175	USA	Isabelle Inthisone	279	2019/2020 season (100%)		182	97		
175	USA	Isabelle Inthisone	279	2018/2019 season (100%)					
175	USA	Isabelle Inthisone	279	2017/2018 season (70%)					
176	USA	Caroline Zhang	278	2019/2020 season (100%)					
176	USA	Caroline Zhang	278	2018/2019 season (100%)					
176	USA	Caroline Zhang	278	2017/2018 season (70%)				153	125
177	CAN	Hannah Dawson	275	2019/2020 season (100%)				178	
177	CAN	Hannah Dawson	275	2018/2019 season (100%)		97			
177	CAN	Hannah Dawson	275	2017/2018 season (70%)					
178	TUR	Güzide Irmak Bayır	271	2019/2020 season (100%)				203	
178	TUR	Güzide Irmak Bayır	271	2018/2019 season (100%)					
178	TUR	Güzide Irmak Bayır	271	2017/2018 season (70%)		68			
179	AUT	Natalie Klotz	269	2019/2020 season (100%)					
179	AUT	Natalie Klotz	269	2018/2019 season (100%)					
179	AUT	Natalie Klotz	269	2017/2018 season (70%)				142	127
179	GBR	Danielle Harrison	269	2019/2020 season (100%)				203	
179	GBR	Danielle Harrison	269	2018/2019 season (100%)					
179	GBR	Danielle Harrison	269	2017/2018 season (70%)				142	127
179	SVK	Nina Letenayova	269	2019/2020 season (100%)					
179	SVK	Nina Letenayova	269	2018/2019 season (100%)					
179	SVK	Nina Letenayova	269	2017/2018 season (70%)				142	127
182	ISR	Alina Soupian	261	2019/2020 season (100%)					
182	ISR	Alina Soupian	261	2018/2019 season (100%)	44	120	97		
182	ISR	Alina Soupian	261	2017/2018 season (70%)					
183	AUT	Alisa Stomakhina	254	2019/2020 season (100%)					
183	AUT	Alisa Stomakhina	254	2018/2019 season (100%)					
183	AUT	Alisa Stomakhina	254	2017/2018 season (70%)				127	127
184	RUS	Ksenia Tsibinova	250	2019/2020 season (100%)				250	
184	RUS	Ksenia Tsibinova	250	2018/2019 season (100%)					
184	RUS	Ksenia Tsibinova	250	2017/2018 season (70%)					
184	SUI	Tanja Odermatt	250	2019/2020 season (100%)					
184	SUI	Tanja Odermatt	250	2018/2019 season (100%)				250	
184	SUI	Tanja Odermatt	250	2017/2018 season (70%)					
184	UKR	Anastasia Gozhva	250	2019/2020 season (100%)				203	
184	UKR	Anastasia Gozhva	250	2018/2019 season (100%)				250	
184	UKR	Anastasia Gozhva	250	2017/2018 season (70%)					
187	LTU	Elžbieta Kropa	246	2019/2020 season (100%)					
187	LTU	Elžbieta Kropa	246	2018/2019 season (100%)				182	
187	LTU	Elžbieta Kropa	246	2017/2018 season (70%)	64				
188	EST	Niina Petrokina	245	2019/2020 season (100%)		148	97		
188	EST	Niina Petrokina	245	2018/2019 season (100%)					
188	EST	Niina Petrokina	245	2017/2018 season (70%)					
189	RUS	Elizaveta Nugumanova	243	2019/2020 season (100%)				243	
189	RUS	Elizaveta Nugumanova	243	2018/2019 season (100%)					
189	RUS	Elizaveta Nugumanova	243	2017/2018 season (70%)					
190	CHN	Zhu Yi	237	2019/2020 season (100%)	237				
190	CHN	Zhu Yi	237	2018/2019 season (100%)					
190	CHN	Zhu Yi	237	2017/2018 season (70%)					
191	USA	Kaitlyn Nguyen	230	2019/2020 season (100%)					
191	USA	Kaitlyn Nguyen	230	2018/2019 season (100%)					
191	USA	Kaitlyn Nguyen	230	2017/2018 season (70%)		115	115		
192	USA	Ashley Wagner	227	2019/2020 season (100%)					
192	USA	Ashley Wagner	227	2018/2019 season (100%)					
192	USA	Ashley Wagner	227	2017/2018 season (70%)		227			
193	UKR	Maryna Zhdanovych	225	2019/2020 season (100%)				225	
193	UKR	Maryna Zhdanovych	225	2018/2019 season (100%)					
193	UKR	Maryna Zhdanovych	225	2017/2018 season (70%)					
193	USA	Emily Zhang	225	2019/2020 season (100%)				225	
193	USA	Emily Zhang	225	2018/2019 season (100%)					
193	USA	Emily Zhang	225	2017/2018 season (70%)					
195	JPN	Akari Matsuoka	220	2019/2020 season (100%)					
195	JPN	Akari Matsuoka	220	2018/2019 season (100%)					
195	JPN	Akari Matsuoka	220	2017/2018 season (70%)		127	93		
196	RUS	Alexandra Avstriyskaya	213	2019/2020 season (100%)					
196	RUS	Alexandra Avstriyskaya	213	2018/2019 season (100%)					
196	RUS	Alexandra Avstriyskaya	213	2017/2018 season (70%)				112	101
196	SUI	Anaïs Coraducci	213	2019/2020 season (100%)				164	
196	SUI	Anaïs Coraducci	213	2018/2019 season (100%)	49				
196	SUI	Anaïs Coraducci	213	2017/2018 season (70%)					
198	CAN	Madeline Schizas	203	2019/2020 season (100%)				203	
198	CAN	Madeline Schizas	203	2018/2019 season (100%)					
198	CAN	Madeline Schizas	203	2017/2018 season (70%)					
198	GBR	Bethany Powell	203	2019/2020 season (100%)					
198	GBR	Bethany Powell	203	2018/2019 season (100%)				203	
198	GBR	Bethany Powell	203	2017/2018 season (70%)					
198	JPN	Rino Matsuike	203	2019/2020 season (100%)		203			
198	JPN	Rino Matsuike	203	2018/2019 season (100%)					
198	JPN	Rino Matsuike	203	2017/2018 season (70%)					
198	USA	Brynne McIsaac	203	2019/2020 season (100%)					
198	USA	Brynne McIsaac	203	2018/2019 season (100%)				203	
198	USA	Brynne McIsaac	203	2017/2018 season (70%)					
202	SVK	Silvia Hugec	196	2019/2020 season (100%)					
202	SVK	Silvia Hugec	196	2018/2019 season (100%)				144	
202	SVK	Silvia Hugec	196	2017/2018 season (70%)		52			
203	SWE	Cassandra Johansson	182	2019/2020 season (100%)				182	
203	SWE	Cassandra Johansson	182	2018/2019 season (100%)					
203	SWE	Cassandra Johansson	182	2017/2018 season (70%)					
203	USA	Maxine Bautista	182	2019/2020 season (100%)					
203	USA	Maxine Bautista	182	2018/2019 season (100%)				182	
203	USA	Maxine Bautista	182	2017/2018 season (70%)					
205	KOR	Lee Si-won	178	2019/2020 season (100%)				178	
205	KOR	Lee Si-won	178	2018/2019 season (100%)					
205	KOR	Lee Si-won	178	2017/2018 season (70%)					
206	HKG	Joanna So	173	2019/2020 season (100%)					
206	HKG	Joanna So	173	2018/2019 season (100%)	102				
206	HKG	Joanna So	173	2017/2018 season (70%)	71				
206	THA	Thita Lamsam	173	2019/2020 season (100%)					
206	THA	Thita Lamsam	173	2018/2019 season (100%)					
206	THA	Thita Lamsam	173	2017/2018 season (70%)	58			115	
208	BUL	Kristina Grigorova	164	2019/2020 season (100%)					
208	BUL	Kristina Grigorova	164	2018/2019 season (100%)				164	
208	BUL	Kristina Grigorova	164	2017/2018 season (70%)					
208	CZE	Klára Štěpánová	164	2019/2020 season (100%)				164	
208	CZE	Klára Štěpánová	164	2018/2019 season (100%)					
208	CZE	Klára Štěpánová	164	2017/2018 season (70%)					
208	FIN	Oona Ounasvuori	164	2019/2020 season (100%)				164	
208	FIN	Oona Ounasvuori	164	2018/2019 season (100%)					
208	FIN	Oona Ounasvuori	164	2017/2018 season (70%)					
208	FIN	Jade Rautiainen	164	2019/2020 season (100%)					
208	FIN	Jade Rautiainen	164	2018/2019 season (100%)				164	
208	FIN	Jade Rautiainen	164	2017/2018 season (70%)					
208	GRE	Dimitra Korri	164	2019/2020 season (100%)					
208	GRE	Dimitra Korri	164	2018/2019 season (100%)				164	
208	GRE	Dimitra Korri	164	2017/2018 season (70%)					
208	ISR	Nelli Ioffe	164	2019/2020 season (100%)				164	
208	ISR	Nelli Ioffe	164	2018/2019 season (100%)					
208	ISR	Nelli Ioffe	164	2017/2018 season (70%)					
208	SVK	Bronislava Dobiášová	164	2019/2020 season (100%)					
208	SVK	Bronislava Dobiášová	164	2018/2019 season (100%)				164	
208	SVK	Bronislava Dobiášová	164	2017/2018 season (70%)					
208	SWE	Natasja Remstedt	164	2019/2020 season (100%)					
208	SWE	Natasja Remstedt	164	2018/2019 season (100%)				164	
208	SWE	Natasja Remstedt	164	2017/2018 season (70%)					
208	USA	Sierra Venetta	164	2019/2020 season (100%)				164	
208	USA	Sierra Venetta	164	2018/2019 season (100%)					
208	USA	Sierra Venetta	164	2017/2018 season (70%)					
217	KOR	Lee Hyun-soo	160	2019/2020 season (100%)					
217	KOR	Lee Hyun-soo	160	2018/2019 season (100%)					
217	KOR	Lee Hyun-soo	160	2017/2018 season (70%)		84	76		
218	BLR	Milana Ramashova	157	2019/2020 season (100%)	157				
218	BLR	Milana Ramashova	157	2018/2019 season (100%)					
218	BLR	Milana Ramashova	157	2017/2018 season (70%)					
219	TPE	Jenny Shyu	156	2019/2020 season (100%)	156				
219	TPE	Jenny Shyu	156	2018/2019 season (100%)					
219	TPE	Jenny Shyu	156	2017/2018 season (70%)					
220	RUS	Anastasia Gracheva	153	2019/2020 season (100%)					
220	RUS	Anastasia Gracheva	153	2018/2019 season (100%)					
220	RUS	Anastasia Gracheva	153	2017/2018 season (70%)				153	
221	RUS	Valeriia Mikhailova	149	2019/2020 season (100%)					
221	RUS	Valeriia Mikhailova	149	2018/2019 season (100%)					
221	RUS	Valeriia Mikhailova	149	2017/2018 season (70%)		149			
222	CAN	Kaiya Ruiter	148	2019/2020 season (100%)		148			
222	CAN	Kaiya Ruiter	148	2018/2019 season (100%)					
222	CAN	Kaiya Ruiter	148	2017/2018 season (70%)					
222	USA	Kate Wang	148	2019/2020 season (100%)		148			
222	USA	Kate Wang	148	2018/2019 season (100%)					
222	USA	Kate Wang	148	2017/2018 season (70%)					
224	CHN	Zhang Yixuan	144	2019/2020 season (100%)				144	
224	CHN	Zhang Yixuan	144	2018/2019 season (100%)					
224	CHN	Zhang Yixuan	144	2017/2018 season (70%)					
225	JPN	Rino Kasakake	142	2019/2020 season (100%)					
225	JPN	Rino Kasakake	142	2018/2019 season (100%)					
225	JPN	Rino Kasakake	142	2017/2018 season (70%)		142			
226	USA	Emilia Murdock	133	2019/2020 season (100%)		133			
226	USA	Emilia Murdock	133	2018/2019 season (100%)					
226	USA	Emilia Murdock	133	2017/2018 season (70%)					
227	CAN	Sandra Ramond	127	2019/2020 season (100%)					
227	CAN	Sandra Ramond	127	2018/2019 season (100%)					
227	CAN	Sandra Ramond	127	2017/2018 season (70%)				127	
227	KAZ	Zhansaya Adykhanova	127	2019/2020 season (100%)					
227	KAZ	Zhansaya Adykhanova	127	2018/2019 season (100%)					
227	KAZ	Zhansaya Adykhanova	127	2017/2018 season (70%)				127	
229	HKG	Cheuk Ka Kahlen Cheung	126	2019/2020 season (100%)	126				
229	HKG	Cheuk Ka Kahlen Cheung	126	2018/2019 season (100%)					
229	HKG	Cheuk Ka Kahlen Cheung	126	2017/2018 season (70%)					
230	CAN	Emy Decelles	125	2019/2020 season (100%)					
230	CAN	Emy Decelles	125	2018/2019 season (100%)					
230	CAN	Emy Decelles	125	2017/2018 season (70%)				125	
231	USA	Pooja Kalyan	120	2019/2020 season (100%)					
231	USA	Pooja Kalyan	120	2018/2019 season (100%)		120			
231	USA	Pooja Kalyan	120	2017/2018 season (70%)					
231	USA	Jessica Lin	120	2019/2020 season (100%)		120			
231	USA	Jessica Lin	120	2018/2019 season (100%)					
231	USA	Jessica Lin	120	2017/2018 season (70%)					
231	USA	Lindsay Thorngren	120	2019/2020 season (100%)		120			
231	USA	Lindsay Thorngren	120	2018/2019 season (100%)					
231	USA	Lindsay Thorngren	120	2017/2018 season (70%)					
234	BUL	Svetoslava Ryadkova	115	2019/2020 season (100%)					
234	BUL	Svetoslava Ryadkova	115	2018/2019 season (100%)					
234	BUL	Svetoslava Ryadkova	115	2017/2018 season (70%)				115	
234	FRA	Julie Froetscher	115	2019/2020 season (100%)					
234	FRA	Julie Froetscher	115	2018/2019 season (100%)					
234	FRA	Julie Froetscher	115	2017/2018 season (70%)				115	
234	KOR	Son Suh-hyun	115	2019/2020 season (100%)					
234	KOR	Son Suh-hyun	115	2018/2019 season (100%)					
234	KOR	Son Suh-hyun	115	2017/2018 season (70%)				115	
234	BLR	Elin Hallberg	115	2019/2020 season (100%)					
234	BLR	Elin Hallberg	115	2018/2019 season (100%)					
234	BLR	Elin Hallberg	115	2017/2018 season (70%)				115	
238	BLR	Fruzsina Medgyesi	112	2019/2020 season (100%)					
238	BLR	Fruzsina Medgyesi	112	2018/2019 season (100%)					
238	BLR	Fruzsina Medgyesi	112	2017/2018 season (70%)				112	
239	CHN	Zhao Ziquan	109	2019/2020 season (100%)					
239	CHN	Zhao Ziquan	109	2018/2019 season (100%)					
239	CHN	Zhao Ziquan	109	2017/2018 season (70%)	109				
240	CAN	Sarah-Maude Blanchard	108	2019/2020 season (100%)					
240	CAN	Sarah-Maude Blanchard	108	2018/2019 season (100%)		108			
240	CAN	Sarah-Maude Blanchard	108	2017/2018 season (70%)					
240	CAN	Emma Bulawka	108	2019/2020 season (100%)					
240	CAN	Emma Bulawka	108	2018/2019 season (100%)		108			
240	CAN	Emma Bulawka	108	2017/2018 season (70%)					
240	LTU	Paulina Ramanauskaitė	108	2019/2020 season (100%)					
240	LTU	Paulina Ramanauskaitė	108	2018/2019 season (100%)		108			
240	LTU	Paulina Ramanauskaitė	108	2017/2018 season (70%)					
243	JPN	Akari Matsubara	104	2019/2020 season (100%)					
243	JPN	Akari Matsubara	104	2018/2019 season (100%)					
243	JPN	Akari Matsubara	104	2017/2018 season (70%)		104			
243	USA	Tessa Hong	104	2019/2020 season (100%)					
243	USA	Tessa Hong	104	2018/2019 season (100%)					
243	USA	Tessa Hong	104	2017/2018 season (70%)		104			
245	USA	Hannah Miller	101	2019/2020 season (100%)					
245	USA	Hannah Miller	101	2018/2019 season (100%)					
245	USA	Hannah Miller	101	2017/2018 season (70%)				101	
246	CHN	Jin Hengxin	97	2019/2020 season (100%)		97			
246	CHN	Jin Hengxin	97	2018/2019 season (100%)					
246	CHN	Jin Hengxin	97	2017/2018 season (70%)					
246	ITA	Ginevra Lavinia Negrello	97	2019/2020 season (100%)		97			
246	ITA	Ginevra Lavinia Negrello	97	2018/2019 season (100%)					
246	ITA	Ginevra Lavinia Negrello	97	2017/2018 season (70%)					
246	USA	Sarah Jung	97	2019/2020 season (100%)		97			
246	USA	Sarah Jung	97	2018/2019 season (100%)					
246	USA	Sarah Jung	97	2017/2018 season (70%)					
249	TPE	Tzu-Han Ting	93	2019/2020 season (100%)	93				
249	TPE	Tzu-Han Ting	93	2018/2019 season (100%)					
249	TPE	Tzu-Han Ting	93	2017/2018 season (70%)					
250	FIN	Sofia Sula	84	2019/2020 season (100%)					
250	FIN	Sofia Sula	84	2018/2019 season (100%)					
250	FIN	Sofia Sula	84	2017/2018 season (70%)		84			
250	KOR	Jeon Su-been	84	2019/2020 season (100%)					
250	KOR	Jeon Su-been	84	2018/2019 season (100%)					
250	KOR	Jeon Su-been	84	2017/2018 season (70%)		84			
250	UKR	Sofiia Nesterova	84	2019/2020 season (100%)					
250	UKR	Sofiia Nesterova	84	2018/2019 season (100%)					
250	UKR	Sofiia Nesterova	84	2017/2018 season (70%)		84			
253	KOR	Ko Eun-bi	76	2019/2020 season (100%)					
253	KOR	Ko Eun-bi	76	2018/2019 season (100%)					
253	KOR	Ko Eun-bi	76	2017/2018 season (70%)		76			
254	GER	Nargiz Süleymanova	75	2019/2020 season (100%)	75				
254	GER	Nargiz Süleymanova	75	2018/2019 season (100%)					
254	GER	Nargiz Süleymanova	75	2017/2018 season (70%)					
255	UKR	Anastasiia Shabotova	68	2019/2020 season (100%)	68				
255	UKR	Anastasiia Shabotova	68	2018/2019 season (100%)					
255	UKR	Anastasiia Shabotova	68	2017/2018 season (70%)					
255	USA	Angelina Huang	68	2019/2020 season (100%)					
255	USA	Angelina Huang	68	2018/2019 season (100%)					
255	USA	Angelina Huang	68	2017/2018 season (70%)		68			
257	THA	Natalie Sangkagalo	64	2019/2020 season (100%)					
257	THA	Natalie Sangkagalo	64	2018/2019 season (100%)					
257	THA	Natalie Sangkagalo	64	2017/2018 season (70%)	64				
258	LAT	Anete Lace	61	2019/2020 season (100%)	61				
258	LAT	Anete Lace	61	2018/2019 season (100%)					
258	LAT	Anete Lace	61	2017/2018 season (70%)					
259	GER	Ann-Christin Marold	48	2019/2020 season (100%)					
259	GER	Ann-Christin Marold	48	2018/2019 season (100%)					
259	GER	Ann-Christin Marold	48	2017/2018 season (70%)	48				
260	HUN	Regina Schermann	44	2019/2020 season (100%)	44				
260	HUN	Regina Schermann	44	2018/2019 season (100%)					
260	HUN	Regina Schermann	44	2017/2018 season (70%)					
261	KAZ	Alana Toktarova	39	2019/2020 season (100%)					
261	KAZ	Alana Toktarova	39	2018/2019 season (100%)					
261	KAZ	Alana Toktarova	39	2017/2018 season (70%)	39				

==== Pairs ====
As of March 5, 2020.

Rank	Nation	Couple	Points	Season	ISU Championships or Olympics	(Junior) Grand Prix and Final		Selected International Competition	
Rank	Nation	Couple	Points	Season	Best	Best	2nd Best	Best	2nd Best
1	RUS	Evgenia Tarasova / Vladimir Morozov	4392	2019/2020 season (100%)	756	360	(324)	270	
1	RUS	Evgenia Tarasova / Vladimir Morozov	4392	2018/2019 season (100%)	1080	648	400	300	
1	RUS	Evgenia Tarasova / Vladimir Morozov	4392	2017/2018 season (70%)	(756)	368	(280)	210	
2	CHN	Peng Cheng / Jin Yang	4284	2019/2020 season (100%)	756	720	400	243	
2	CHN	Peng Cheng / Jin Yang	4284	2018/2019 season (100%)	875	720	360		
2	CHN	Peng Cheng / Jin Yang	4284	2017/2018 season (70%)	(362)	(183)	(183)	210	
3	RUS	Aleksandra Boikova / Dmitrii Kozlovskii	4060	2019/2020 season (100%)	840	583	400		
3	RUS	Aleksandra Boikova / Dmitrii Kozlovskii	4060	2018/2019 season (100%)	709	324	292	270	243
3	RUS	Aleksandra Boikova / Dmitrii Kozlovskii	4060	2017/2018 season (70%)		(161)	(158)	210	189
4	CHN	Sui Wenjing / Han Cong	4024	2019/2020 season (100%)	840	800	400		
4	CHN	Sui Wenjing / Han Cong	4024	2018/2019 season (100%)	1200				
4	CHN	Sui Wenjing / Han Cong	4024	2017/2018 season (70%)	(756)	504	240		
5	CAN	Kirsten Moore-Towers / Michael Marinaro	3987	2019/2020 season (100%)	680	525	360	300	
5	CAN	Kirsten Moore-Towers / Michael Marinaro	3987	2018/2019 season (100%)	756	324	292	270	270
5	CAN	Kirsten Moore-Towers / Michael Marinaro	3987	2017/2018 season (70%)	(496)	(227)	(165)	210	
6	FRA	Vanessa James / Morgan Ciprès	3709	2019/2020 season (100%)					
6	FRA	Vanessa James / Morgan Ciprès	3709	2018/2019 season (100%)	840	800	400	300	
6	FRA	Vanessa James / Morgan Ciprès	3709	2017/2018 season (70%)	680	252	227	210	
7	RUS	Natalia Zabiiako / Alexander Enbert	3696	2019/2020 season (100%)					
7	RUS	Natalia Zabiiako / Alexander Enbert	3696	2018/2019 season (100%)	972	583	400	300	
7	RUS	Natalia Zabiiako / Alexander Enbert	3696	2017/2018 season (70%)	613	204	204	210	210
8	ITA	Nicole Della Monica / Matteo Guarise	3474	2019/2020 season (100%)	612	292	(191)	225	
8	ITA	Nicole Della Monica / Matteo Guarise	3474	2018/2019 season (100%)	612	525	360	243	
8	ITA	Nicole Della Monica / Matteo Guarise	3474	2017/2018 season (70%)	(551)	227	(204)	189	189
9	USA	Ashley Cain-Gribble / Timothy LeDuc	3353	2019/2020 season (100%)		292	262	300	300
9	USA	Ashley Cain-Gribble / Timothy LeDuc	3353	2018/2019 season (100%)	612	324	236	300	198
9	USA	Ashley Cain-Gribble / Timothy LeDuc	3353	2017/2018 season (70%)	529	(165)		(153)	
10	RUS	Daria Pavliuchenko / Denis Khodykin	3260	2019/2020 season (100%)	680	472	360		
10	RUS	Daria Pavliuchenko / Denis Khodykin	3260	2018/2019 season (100%)	551	472	324	203	198
10	RUS	Daria Pavliuchenko / Denis Khodykin	3260	2017/2018 season (70%)	(350)	(199)	(175)		
11	USA	Tarah Kayne / Danny O'Shea	3162	2019/2020 season (100%)	551	236	236	270	219
11	USA	Tarah Kayne / Danny O'Shea	3162	2018/2019 season (100%)	(496)	360	262	270	
11	USA	Tarah Kayne / Danny O'Shea	3162	2017/2018 season (70%)	588			170	
12	AUT	Miriam Ziegler / Severin Kiefer	3118	2019/2020 season (100%)	496	292	262	250	219
12	AUT	Miriam Ziegler / Severin Kiefer	3118	2018/2019 season (100%)	465	292	292	300	250
12	AUT	Miriam Ziegler / Severin Kiefer	3118	2017/2018 season (70%)	(312)	(165)	(165)	(153)	
13	RUS	Anastasia Mishina / Aleksandr Galliamov	2982	2019/2020 season (100%)		648	400	300	250
13	RUS	Anastasia Mishina / Aleksandr Galliamov	2982	2018/2019 season (100%)	500	350	250		
13	RUS	Anastasia Mishina / Aleksandr Galliamov	2982	2017/2018 season (70%)	284				
14	GER	Minerva Fabienne Hase / Nolan Seegert	2969	2019/2020 season (100%)	551	324	213	243	198
14	GER	Minerva Fabienne Hase / Nolan Seegert	2969	2018/2019 season (100%)	496	262	213	250	219
14	GER	Minerva Fabienne Hase / Nolan Seegert	2969	2017/2018 season (70%)				170	(153)
15	USA	Alexa Scimeca Knierim / Chris Knierim	2313	2019/2020 season (100%)		292	213	270	
15	USA	Alexa Scimeca Knierim / Chris Knierim	2313	2018/2019 season (100%)		324	292	270	270
15	USA	Alexa Scimeca Knierim / Chris Knierim	2313	2017/2018 season (70%)	193	(183)	(183)	189	
16	RUS	Alisa Efimova / Alexander Korovin	2164	2019/2020 season (100%)		292	191	270	
16	RUS	Alisa Efimova / Alexander Korovin	2164	2018/2019 season (100%)		360	262	300	300
16	RUS	Alisa Efimova / Alexander Korovin	2164	2017/2018 season (70%)				189	(170)
17	RUS	Apollinariia Panfilova / Dmitry Rylov	2059	2019/2020 season (100%)	500	350	250		
17	RUS	Apollinariia Panfilova / Dmitry Rylov	2059	2018/2019 season (100%)	450	284	225		
17	RUS	Apollinariia Panfilova / Dmitry Rylov	2059	2017/2018 season (70%)		(221)	(175)		
18	ITA	Rebecca Ghilardi / Filippo Ambrosini	2004	2019/2020 season (100%)	402	213	191	250	203
18	ITA	Rebecca Ghilardi / Filippo Ambrosini	2004	2018/2019 season (100%)	362			219	164
18	ITA	Rebecca Ghilardi / Filippo Ambrosini	2004	2017/2018 season (70%)				(142)	
19	USA	Haven Denney / Brandon Frazier	1980	2019/2020 season (100%)		324	324		
19	USA	Haven Denney / Brandon Frazier	1980	2018/2019 season (100%)	551	236		243	
19	USA	Haven Denney / Brandon Frazier	1980	2017/2018 season (70%)		149	(149)	153	
20	PRK	Ryom Tae-ok / Kim Ju-sik	1953	2019/2020 season (100%)		262		243	
20	PRK	Ryom Tae-ok / Kim Ju-sik	1953	2018/2019 season (100%)	418	292	262		
20	PRK	Ryom Tae-ok / Kim Ju-sik	1953	2017/2018 season (70%)	476				
21	USA	Jessica Calalang / Brian Johnson	1902	2019/2020 season (100%)	612	292	236	300	
21	USA	Jessica Calalang / Brian Johnson	1902	2018/2019 season (100%)				243	219
21	USA	Jessica Calalang / Brian Johnson	1902	2017/2018 season (70%)					
22	USA	Audrey Lu / Misha Mitrofanov	1876	2019/2020 season (100%)		191		225	198
22	USA	Audrey Lu / Misha Mitrofanov	1876	2018/2019 season (100%)		236	213	270	198
22	USA	Audrey Lu / Misha Mitrofanov	1876	2017/2018 season (70%)	230	115	(115)		
23	GER	Aljona Savchenko / Bruno Massot	1869	2019/2020 season (100%)					
23	GER	Aljona Savchenko / Bruno Massot	1869	2018/2019 season (100%)					
23	GER	Aljona Savchenko / Bruno Massot	1869	2017/2018 season (70%)	840	560	280	189	
24	AUS	Ekaterina Alexandrovskaya / Harley Windsor	1854	2019/2020 season (100%)		213			
24	AUS	Ekaterina Alexandrovskaya / Harley Windsor	1854	2018/2019 season (100%)		213	213	243	
24	AUS	Ekaterina Alexandrovskaya / Harley Windsor	1854	2017/2018 season (70%)	347	245	(175)	210	170
25	CAN	Camille Ruest / Andrew Wolfe	1837	2019/2020 season (100%)		236	236		
25	CAN	Camille Ruest / Andrew Wolfe	1837	2018/2019 season (100%)	402	262	191	198	
25	CAN	Camille Ruest / Andrew Wolfe	1837	2017/2018 season (70%)	312				
26	CAN	Evelyn Walsh / Trennt Michaud	1822	2019/2020 season (100%)	496	236	191		
26	CAN	Evelyn Walsh / Trennt Michaud	1822	2018/2019 season (100%)	446	262	191		
26	CAN	Evelyn Walsh / Trennt Michaud	1822	2017/2018 season (70%)	(207)	(142)	(127)		
27	GBR	Zoe Jones / Christopher Boyadji	1699	2019/2020 season (100%)	264	191		182	
27	GBR	Zoe Jones / Christopher Boyadji	1699	2018/2019 season (100%)	325			225	203
27	GBR	Zoe Jones / Christopher Boyadji	1699	2017/2018 season (70%)		134		175	127
28	RUS	Polina Kostiukovich / Dmitrii Ialin	1564	2019/2020 season (100%)					
28	RUS	Polina Kostiukovich / Dmitrii Ialin	1564	2018/2019 season (100%)	405	315	250		
28	RUS	Polina Kostiukovich / Dmitrii Ialin	1564	2017/2018 season (70%)	315	175	104		
29	RUS	Kseniia Akhanteva / Valerii Kolesov	1489	2019/2020 season (100%)	450	284	250		
29	RUS	Kseniia Akhanteva / Valerii Kolesov	1489	2018/2019 season (100%)		255	250		
29	RUS	Kseniia Akhanteva / Valerii Kolesov	1489	2017/2018 season (70%)		(104)			
30	CHN	Tang Feiyao / Yang Yongchao	1417	2019/2020 season (100%)		213	213	219	
30	CHN	Tang Feiyao / Yang Yongchao	1417	2018/2019 season (100%)	365	164	133		
30	CHN	Tang Feiyao / Yang Yongchao	1417	2017/2018 season (70%)	110	(127)			
31	CAN	Liubov Ilyushechkina / Charlie Bilodeau	1275	2019/2020 season (100%)	446	324	262	243	
31	CAN	Liubov Ilyushechkina / Charlie Bilodeau	1275	2018/2019 season (100%)					
31	CAN	Liubov Ilyushechkina / Charlie Bilodeau	1275	2017/2018 season (70%)					
32	ITA	Valentina Marchei / Ondřej Hotárek	1263	2019/2020 season (100%)					
32	ITA	Valentina Marchei / Ondřej Hotárek	1263	2018/2019 season (100%)					
32	ITA	Valentina Marchei / Ondřej Hotárek	1263	2017/2018 season (70%)	496	204	183	210	170
33	CHN	Yu Xiaoyu / Zhang Hao	1204	2019/2020 season (100%)					
33	CHN	Yu Xiaoyu / Zhang Hao	1204	2018/2019 season (100%)					
33	CHN	Yu Xiaoyu / Zhang Hao	1204	2017/2018 season (70%)	447	330	252	175	
34	RUS	Alina Pepeleva / Roman Pleshkov	1156	2019/2020 season (100%)		230	203	270	250
34	RUS	Alina Pepeleva / Roman Pleshkov	1156	2018/2019 season (100%)		203			
34	RUS	Alina Pepeleva / Roman Pleshkov	1156	2017/2018 season (70%)					
35	CRO	Lana Petranović / Antonio Souza-Kordeiru	1153	2019/2020 season (100%)	192				
35	CRO	Lana Petranović / Antonio Souza-Kordeiru	1153	2018/2019 season (100%)	402			250	182
35	CRO	Lana Petranović / Antonio Souza-Kordeiru	1153	2017/2018 season (70%)	(185)			127	
36	FRA	Cléo Hamon / Denys Strekalin	1093	2019/2020 season (100%)	362	120			
36	FRA	Cléo Hamon / Denys Strekalin	1093	2018/2019 season (100%)	215	164	148		
36	FRA	Cléo Hamon / Denys Strekalin	1093	2017/2018 season (70%)	(122)	84			
37	GER	Annika Hocke / Robert Kunkel	1081	2019/2020 season (100%)	446	207	203	225	
37	GER	Annika Hocke / Robert Kunkel	1081	2018/2019 season (100%)					
37	GER	Annika Hocke / Robert Kunkel	1081	2017/2018 season (70%)					
38	USA	Kate Finster / Balazs Nagy	950	2019/2020 season (100%)	295	225	148		
38	USA	Kate Finster / Balazs Nagy	950	2018/2019 season (100%)	174	108			
38	USA	Kate Finster / Balazs Nagy	950	2017/2018 season (70%)					
39	RUS	Iuliia Artemeva / Mikhail Nazarychev	910	2019/2020 season (100%)	405	255	250		
39	RUS	Iuliia Artemeva / Mikhail Nazarychev	910	2018/2019 season (100%)					
39	RUS	Iuliia Artemeva / Mikhail Nazarychev	910	2017/2018 season (70%)					
40	UKR	Sofiia Nesterova / Artem Darenskyi	873	2019/2020 season (100%)		97		164	
40	UKR	Sofiia Nesterova / Artem Darenskyi	873	2018/2019 season (100%)	239	164	120		
40	UKR	Sofiia Nesterova / Artem Darenskyi	873	2017/2018 season (70%)	89				
41	USA	Laiken Lockley / Keenan Prochnow	855	2019/2020 season (100%)					
41	USA	Laiken Lockley / Keenan Prochnow	855	2018/2019 season (100%)	295	182	148		
41	USA	Laiken Lockley / Keenan Prochnow	855	2017/2018 season (70%)		115	115		
42	ISR	Anna Vernikov / Evgeni Krasnopolski	807	2019/2020 season (100%)	237			203	164
42	ISR	Anna Vernikov / Evgeni Krasnopolski	807	2018/2019 season (100%)					
42	ISR	Anna Vernikov / Evgeni Krasnopolski	807	2017/2018 season (70%)					
43	CAN	Brooke McIntosh / Brandon Toste	767	2019/2020 season (100%)		164	148		
43	CAN	Brooke McIntosh / Brandon Toste	767	2018/2019 season (100%)	194	164	97		
43	CAN	Brooke McIntosh / Brandon Toste	767	2017/2018 season (70%)					
44	HUN	Ioulia Chtchetinina / Márk Magyar	705	2019/2020 season (100%)	325			198	182
44	HUN	Ioulia Chtchetinina / Márk Magyar	705	2018/2019 season (100%)					
44	HUN	Ioulia Chtchetinina / Márk Magyar	705	2017/2018 season (70%)					
45	JPN	Riku Miura / Ryuichi Kihara	664	2019/2020 season (100%)	402	262			
45	JPN	Riku Miura / Ryuichi Kihara	664	2018/2019 season (100%)					
45	JPN	Riku Miura / Ryuichi Kihara	664	2017/2018 season (70%)					
46	ESP	Laura Barquero / Tòn Cónsul	636	2019/2020 season (100%)	214			219	203
46	ESP	Laura Barquero / Tòn Cónsul	636	2018/2019 season (100%)					
46	ESP	Laura Barquero / Tòn Cónsul	636	2017/2018 season (70%)					
47	RUS	Karina Akopova / Maksim Shagalov	626	2019/2020 season (100%)				225	219
47	RUS	Karina Akopova / Maksim Shagalov	626	2018/2019 season (100%)				182	
47	RUS	Karina Akopova / Maksim Shagalov	626	2017/2018 season (70%)					
48	CHN	Wang Yuchen / Huang Yihang	575	2019/2020 season (100%)	239	108	108		
48	CHN	Wang Yuchen / Huang Yihang	575	2018/2019 season (100%)		120			
48	CHN	Wang Yuchen / Huang Yihang	575	2017/2018 season (70%)					
49	CHN	Wang Huidi / Jia Ziqi	561	2019/2020 season (100%)	215	182	164		
49	CHN	Wang Huidi / Jia Ziqi	561	2018/2019 season (100%)					
49	CHN	Wang Huidi / Jia Ziqi	561	2017/2018 season (70%)					
50	RUS	Diana Mukhametzianova / Ilya Mironov	540	2019/2020 season (100%)		315	225		
50	RUS	Diana Mukhametzianova / Ilya Mironov	540	2018/2019 season (100%)					
50	RUS	Diana Mukhametzianova / Ilya Mironov	540	2017/2018 season (70%)					
51	GEO	Alina Butaeva / Luka Berulava	534	2019/2020 season (100%)	266	148	120		
51	GEO	Alina Butaeva / Luka Berulava	534	2018/2019 season (100%)					
51	GEO	Alina Butaeva / Luka Berulava	534	2017/2018 season (70%)					
52	ISR	Hailey Kops / Artem Tsoglin	502	2019/2020 season (100%)					
52	ISR	Hailey Kops / Artem Tsoglin	502	2018/2019 season (100%)	266			164	
52	ISR	Hailey Kops / Artem Tsoglin	502	2017/2018 season (70%)	72				
53	USA	Nica Digerness / Danny Neudecker	455	2019/2020 season (100%)					
53	USA	Nica Digerness / Danny Neudecker	455	2018/2019 season (100%)		236		219	
53	USA	Nica Digerness / Danny Neudecker	455	2017/2018 season (70%)					
54	CAN	Lori-Ann Matte / Thierry Ferland	433	2019/2020 season (100%)					
54	CAN	Lori-Ann Matte / Thierry Ferland	433	2018/2019 season (100%)				198	
54	CAN	Lori-Ann Matte / Thierry Ferland	433	2017/2018 season (70%)	151	84			
55	UKR	Kateryna Dzitsiuk / Ivan Pavlov	423	2019/2020 season (100%)	157	133	133		
55	UKR	Kateryna Dzitsiuk / Ivan Pavlov	423	2018/2019 season (100%)					
55	UKR	Kateryna Dzitsiuk / Ivan Pavlov	423	2017/2018 season (70%)					
56	FRA	Coline Keriven / Noël-Antoine Pierre	408	2019/2020 season (100%)	293				
56	FRA	Coline Keriven / Noël-Antoine Pierre	408	2018/2019 season (100%)					
56	FRA	Coline Keriven / Noël-Antoine Pierre	408	2017/2018 season (70%)				115	
57	CAN	Patricia Andrew / Zachary Daleman	391	2019/2020 season (100%)	174	120	97		
57	CAN	Patricia Andrew / Zachary Daleman	391	2018/2019 season (100%)					
57	CAN	Patricia Andrew / Zachary Daleman	391	2017/2018 season (70%)					
58	GER	Elena Pavlova / Ruben Blommaert	380	2019/2020 season (100%)				198	182
58	GER	Elena Pavlova / Ruben Blommaert	380	2018/2019 season (100%)					
58	GER	Elena Pavlova / Ruben Blommaert	380	2017/2018 season (70%)					
59	CAN	Gabrielle Levesque / Pier-Alexandre Hudon	367	2019/2020 season (100%)		133			
59	CAN	Gabrielle Levesque / Pier-Alexandre Hudon	367	2018/2019 season (100%)	114	120			
59	CAN	Gabrielle Levesque / Pier-Alexandre Hudon	367	2017/2018 season (70%)					
60	PHI	Isabella Gamez / David-Alexandre Paradis	362	2019/2020 season (100%)	362				
60	PHI	Isabella Gamez / David-Alexandre Paradis	362	2018/2019 season (100%)					
60	PHI	Isabella Gamez / David-Alexandre Paradis	362	2017/2018 season (70%)					
61	RUS	Anna Shcheglova / Ilia Kalashnikov	346	2019/2020 season (100%)		182	164		
61	RUS	Anna Shcheglova / Ilia Kalashnikov	346	2018/2019 season (100%)					
61	RUS	Anna Shcheglova / Ilia Kalashnikov	346	2017/2018 season (70%)					
62	USA	Anastasiia Smirnova / Danylo Siianytsia	327	2019/2020 season (100%)	194	133			
62	USA	Anastasiia Smirnova / Danylo Siianytsia	327	2018/2019 season (100%)					
62	USA	Anastasiia Smirnova / Danylo Siianytsia	327	2017/2018 season (70%)					
63	ITA	Vivienne Contarino / Marco Pauletti	305	2019/2020 season (100%)				164	
63	ITA	Vivienne Contarino / Marco Pauletti	305	2018/2019 season (100%)	141				
63	ITA	Vivienne Contarino / Marco Pauletti	305	2017/2018 season (70%)					
64	USA	Jessica Pfund / Joshua Santillan	292	2019/2020 season (100%)					
64	USA	Jessica Pfund / Joshua Santillan	292	2018/2019 season (100%)					
64	USA	Jessica Pfund / Joshua Santillan	292	2017/2018 season (70%)				153	139
65	CAN	Kelly-Ann Laurin / Loucas Éthier	275	2019/2020 season (100%)	127	148			
65	CAN	Kelly-Ann Laurin / Loucas Éthier	275	2018/2019 season (100%)					
65	CAN	Kelly-Ann Laurin / Loucas Éthier	275	2017/2018 season (70%)					
66	RUS	Ksenia Stolbova / Andrei Novoselov	262	2019/2020 season (100%)		262			
66	RUS	Ksenia Stolbova / Andrei Novoselov	262	2018/2019 season (100%)					
66	RUS	Ksenia Stolbova / Andrei Novoselov	262	2017/2018 season (70%)					
67	SVK	Tereza Zendulkova / Simon Fukas	251	2019/2020 season (100%)					
67	SVK	Tereza Zendulkova / Simon Fukas	251	2018/2019 season (100%)	103	148			
67	SVK	Tereza Zendulkova / Simon Fukas	251	2017/2018 season (70%)					
68	CAN	Justine Brasseur / Mark Bardei	243	2019/2020 season (100%)				243	
68	CAN	Justine Brasseur / Mark Bardei	243	2018/2019 season (100%)					
68	CAN	Justine Brasseur / Mark Bardei	243	2017/2018 season (70%)					
69	CAN	Chloe Panetta / Benjamin Mimar	228	2019/2020 season (100%)		120			
69	CAN	Chloe Panetta / Benjamin Mimar	228	2018/2019 season (100%)		108			
69	CAN	Chloe Panetta / Benjamin Mimar	228	2017/2018 season (70%)					
70	CHN	Liu Motong / Wang Tianze	205	2019/2020 season (100%)		108			
70	CHN	Liu Motong / Wang Tianze	205	2018/2019 season (100%)		97			
70	CHN	Liu Motong / Wang Tianze	205	2017/2018 season (70%)					
71	USA	Olivia Serafini / Mervin Tran	198	2019/2020 season (100%)				198	
71	USA	Olivia Serafini / Mervin Tran	198	2018/2019 season (100%)					
71	USA	Olivia Serafini / Mervin Tran	198	2017/2018 season (70%)					
72	NED	Liubov Efimenko / Dmitry Epstein	182	2019/2020 season (100%)					
72	NED	Liubov Efimenko / Dmitry Epstein	182	2018/2019 season (100%)				182	
72	NED	Liubov Efimenko / Dmitry Epstein	182	2017/2018 season (70%)					
72	RUS	Stanislava Vislobokova / Aleksei Briukhanov	182	2019/2020 season (100%)		182			
72	RUS	Stanislava Vislobokova / Aleksei Briukhanov	182	2018/2019 season (100%)					
72	RUS	Stanislava Vislobokova / Aleksei Briukhanov	182	2017/2018 season (70%)					
74	NED	Daria Danilova / Michel Tsiba	173	2019/2020 season (100%)	173				
74	NED	Daria Danilova / Michel Tsiba	173	2018/2019 season (100%)					
74	NED	Daria Danilova / Michel Tsiba	173	2017/2018 season (70%)					
75	CHN	Sui Jiaying / Guo Yunzhi	169	2019/2020 season (100%)					
75	CHN	Sui Jiaying / Guo Yunzhi	169	2018/2019 season (100%)					
75	CHN	Sui Jiaying / Guo Yunzhi	169	2017/2018 season (70%)		93	76		
76	PRK	Ro Hyang-mi / Han Kum-chol	164	2019/2020 season (100%)		164			
76	PRK	Ro Hyang-mi / Han Kum-chol	164	2018/2019 season (100%)					
76	PRK	Ro Hyang-mi / Han Kum-chol	164	2017/2018 season (70%)					
76	ITA	Sara Conti / Niccolò Macii	164	2019/2020 season (100%)				164	
76	ITA	Sara Conti / Niccolò Macii	164	2018/2019 season (100%)					
76	ITA	Sara Conti / Niccolò Macii	164	2017/2018 season (70%)					
76	SUI	Alexandra Herbríková / Nicolas Roulet	164	2019/2020 season (100%)					
76	SUI	Alexandra Herbríková / Nicolas Roulet	164	2018/2019 season (100%)				164	
76	SUI	Alexandra Herbríková / Nicolas Roulet	164	2017/2018 season (70%)					
79	CHN	Zhang Mingyang / Song Bowen	149	2019/2020 season (100%)					
79	CHN	Zhang Mingyang / Song Bowen	149	2018/2019 season (100%)					
79	CHN	Zhang Mingyang / Song Bowen	149	2017/2018 season (70%)		149			
80	USA	Winter Deardorff / Mikhail Johnson	141	2019/2020 season (100%)	141				
80	USA	Winter Deardorff / Mikhail Johnson	141	2018/2019 season (100%)					
80	USA	Winter Deardorff / Mikhail Johnson	141	2017/2018 season (70%)					
81	FRA	Camille Mendoza / Pavel Kovalev	139	2019/2020 season (100%)					
81	FRA	Camille Mendoza / Pavel Kovalev	139	2018/2019 season (100%)					
81	FRA	Camille Mendoza / Pavel Kovalev	139	2017/2018 season (70%)				139	
82	SWE	Greta Crafoord / John Crafoord	114	2019/2020 season (100%)	114				
82	SWE	Greta Crafoord / John Crafoord	114	2018/2019 season (100%)					
82	SWE	Greta Crafoord / John Crafoord	114	2017/2018 season (70%)					
83	CAN	Camille Perrault / William St-Louis	1008	2019/2020 season (100%)		108			
83	CAN	Camille Perrault / William St-Louis	1008	2018/2019 season (100%)					
83	CAN	Camille Perrault / William St-Louis	1008	2017/2018 season (70%)					
84	ITA	Alyssa Montan / Manuel Piazza	103	2019/2020 season (100%)	103				
84	ITA	Alyssa Montan / Manuel Piazza	103	2018/2019 season (100%)					
84	ITA	Alyssa Montan / Manuel Piazza	103	2017/2018 season (70%)					
85	USA	Isabelle Martins / Ryan Bedard	97	2019/2020 season (100%)		97			
85	USA	Isabelle Martins / Ryan Bedard	97	2018/2019 season (100%)					
85	USA	Isabelle Martins / Ryan Bedard	97	2017/2018 season (70%)					
86	CAN	Chloe Choinard / Mathieu Ostiguy	93	2019/2020 season (100%)					
86	CAN	Chloe Choinard / Mathieu Ostiguy	93	2018/2019 season (100%)					
86	CAN	Chloe Choinard / Mathieu Ostiguy	93	2017/2018 season (70%)		93			

==== Ice dance ====
As of March 7, 2020.

Rank	Nation	Couple	Points	Season	ISU Championships or Olympics	(Junior) Grand Prix and Final		Selected International Competition	
Rank	Nation	Couple	Points	Season	Best	Best	2nd Best	Best	2nd Best
1	RUS	Victoria Sinitsina / Nikita Katsalapov	4642	2019/2020 season (100%)	840	472	400	300	
1	RUS	Victoria Sinitsina / Nikita Katsalapov	4642	2018/2019 season (100%)	1080	720	360	300	
1	RUS	Victoria Sinitsina / Nikita Katsalapov	4642	2017/2018 season (70%)		(227)	(204)	170	
2	USA	Madison Hubbell / Zachary Donohue	4494	2019/2020 season (100%)	(680)	648	400		
2	USA	Madison Hubbell / Zachary Donohue	4494	2018/2019 season (100%)	972	800	400	300	
2	USA	Madison Hubbell / Zachary Donohue	4494	2017/2018 season (70%)	756	408	(252)	210	
3	FRA	Gabriella Papadakis / Guillaume Cizeron	4410	2019/2020 season (100%)	(756)	800	400		
3	FRA	Gabriella Papadakis / Guillaume Cizeron	4410	2018/2019 season (100%)	1200	400			
3	FRA	Gabriella Papadakis / Guillaume Cizeron	4410	2017/2018 season (70%)	840	560	(280)	210	
4	USA	Madison Chock / Evan Bates	4230	2019/2020 season (100%)	840	720	360	300	300
4	USA	Madison Chock / Evan Bates	4230	2018/2019 season (100%)	840			250	
4	USA	Madison Chock / Evan Bates	4230	2017/2018 season (70%)	(551)	368	252		
5	ITA	Charlène Guignard / Marco Fabbri	4148	2019/2020 season (100%)	612	324	324	300	300
5	ITA	Charlène Guignard / Marco Fabbri	4148	2018/2019 season (100%)	680	648	360	300	300
5	ITA	Charlène Guignard / Marco Fabbri	4148	2017/2018 season (70%)	(386)	(183)	(183)	(210)	(189)
6	CAN	Piper Gilles / Paul Poirier	4079	2019/2020 season (100%)	756	525	400	300	
6	CAN	Piper Gilles / Paul Poirier	4079	2018/2019 season (100%)	680	324	324	300	300
6	CAN	Piper Gilles / Paul Poirier	4079	2017/2018 season (70%)	(496)	(204)	(204)	170	
7	RUS	Alexandra Stepanova / Ivan Bukin	3970	2019/2020 season (100%)	680	583	360		
7	RUS	Alexandra Stepanova / Ivan Bukin	3970	2018/2019 season (100%)	875	583	400	300	
7	RUS	Alexandra Stepanova / Ivan Bukin	3970	2017/2018 season (70%)	(476)	(227)	(227)	189	
8	USA	Kaitlin Hawayek / Jean-Luc Baker	3194	2019/2020 season (100%)	(496)	292	262	270	
8	USA	Kaitlin Hawayek / Jean-Luc Baker	3194	2018/2019 season (100%)	551	472	400		
8	USA	Kaitlin Hawayek / Jean-Luc Baker	3194	2017/2018 season (70%)	588	(204)	(183)	189	170
9	GBR	Lilah Fear / Lewis Gibson	3123	2019/2020 season (100%)	551	324	292	270	219
9	GBR	Lilah Fear / Lewis Gibson	3123	2018/2019 season (100%)	496	292	262	219	198
9	GBR	Lilah Fear / Lewis Gibson	3123	2017/2018 season (70%)				(175)	(158)
10	ESP	Sara Hurtado / Kirill Khaliavin	3118	2019/2020 season (100%)	446	324	262	300	270
10	ESP	Sara Hurtado / Kirill Khaliavin	3118	2018/2019 season (100%)	446	360	292	243	
10	ESP	Sara Hurtado / Kirill Khaliavin	3118	2017/2018 season (70%)	(281)			175	(153)
11	CHN	Wang Shiyue / Liu Xinyu	3098	2019/2020 season (100%)	612	292	262	270	225
11	CHN	Wang Shiyue / Liu Xinyu	3098	2018/2019 season (100%)	446	236	236	300	219
11	CHN	Wang Shiyue / Liu Xinyu	3098	2017/2018 season (70%)	(386)	(165)	(134)	(158)	
12	POL	Natalia Kaliszek / Maksym Spodyriev	2972	2019/2020 season (100%)	362	292	236	270	250
12	POL	Natalia Kaliszek / Maksym Spodyriev	2972	2018/2019 season (100%)	551	262	236	270	243
12	POL	Natalia Kaliszek / Maksym Spodyriev	2972	2017/2018 season (70%)	228	(134)		(210)	(175)
13	ESP	Olivia Smart / Adrián Díaz	2872	2019/2020 season (100%)	402	292	292	250	219
13	ESP	Olivia Smart / Adrián Díaz	2872	2018/2019 season (100%)	402	262	213	270	270
13	ESP	Olivia Smart / Adrián Díaz	2872	2017/2018 season (70%)	(264)	(165)		(153)	(139)
14	RUS	Tiffany Zahorski / Jonathan Guerreiro	2871	2019/2020 season (100%)	496	262	262		
14	RUS	Tiffany Zahorski / Jonathan Guerreiro	2871	2018/2019 season (100%)		525	360	250	
14	RUS	Tiffany Zahorski / Jonathan Guerreiro	2871	2017/2018 season (70%)	402	(204)	(165)	189	125
15	CAN	Carolane Soucisse / Shane Firus	2735	2019/2020 season (100%)	446	213	191	243	198
15	CAN	Carolane Soucisse / Shane Firus	2735	2018/2019 season (100%)		262	191	243	219
15	CAN	Carolane Soucisse / Shane Firus	2735	2017/2018 season (70%)	529	(149)		(153)	(139)
16	USA	Christina Carreira / Anthony Ponomarenko	2513	2019/2020 season (100%)		236	236	300	270
16	USA	Christina Carreira / Anthony Ponomarenko	2513	2018/2019 season (100%)		324	262	300	270
16	USA	Christina Carreira / Anthony Ponomarenko	2513	2017/2018 season (70%)	315	221	(175)		
17	FRA	Marie-Jade Lauriault / Romain Le Gac	2501	2019/2020 season (100%)		191	191	300	243
17	FRA	Marie-Jade Lauriault / Romain Le Gac	2501	2018/2019 season (100%)	325	292	236	243	243
17	FRA	Marie-Jade Lauriault / Romain Le Gac	2501	2017/2018 season (70%)	237	(134)	(134)	(142)	(125)
18	CAN	Laurence Fournier Beaudry / Nikolaj Sørensen	2473	2019/2020 season (100%)		324	324	300	270
18	CAN	Laurence Fournier Beaudry / Nikolaj Sørensen	2473	2018/2019 season (100%)	496				
18	CAN	Laurence Fournier Beaudry / Nikolaj Sørensen	2473	2017/2018 season (70%)	253	183		170	153
19	CAN	Kaitlyn Weaver / Andrew Poje	2412	2019/2020 season (100%)					
19	CAN	Kaitlyn Weaver / Andrew Poje	2412	2018/2019 season (100%)	787			300	
19	CAN	Kaitlyn Weaver / Andrew Poje	2412	2017/2018 season (70%)	680	252	204	189	
20	GEO	Maria Kazakova / Georgy Reviya	2263	2019/2020 season (100%)	450	350	250	243	225
20	GEO	Maria Kazakova / Georgy Reviya	2263	2018/2019 season (100%)	295	225	225		
20	GEO	Maria Kazakova / Georgy Reviya	2263	2017/2018 season (70%)	(151)				
21	USA	Lorraine McNamara / Quinn Carpenter	2229	2019/2020 season (100%)				243	219
21	USA	Lorraine McNamara / Quinn Carpenter	2229	2018/2019 season (100%)		324	292	270	270
21	USA	Lorraine McNamara / Quinn Carpenter	2229	2017/2018 season (70%)	428	183		(189)	(175)
22	CAN	Marjorie Lajoie / Zachary Lagha	2224	2019/2020 season (100%)	551	236	213	219	
22	CAN	Marjorie Lajoie / Zachary Lagha	2224	2018/2019 season (100%)	500	255	250		
22	CAN	Marjorie Lajoie / Zachary Lagha	2224	2017/2018 season (70%)	(256)	(175)	(158)		
23	RUS	Anastasia Skoptsova / Kirill Aleshin	1941	2019/2020 season (100%)		213		250	225
23	RUS	Anastasia Skoptsova / Kirill Aleshin	1941	2018/2019 season (100%)		213		270	
23	RUS	Anastasia Skoptsova / Kirill Aleshin	1941	2017/2018 season (70%)	350	245	175		
24	USA	Avonley Nguyen / Vadym Kolesnik	1910	2019/2020 season (100%)	500	315	250		
24	USA	Avonley Nguyen / Vadym Kolesnik	1910	2018/2019 season (100%)	365	250	230		
24	USA	Avonley Nguyen / Vadym Kolesnik	1910	2017/2018 season (70%)		(115)	(104)		
25	RUS	Sofia Shevchenko / Igor Eremenko	1877	2019/2020 season (100%)		213		250	
25	RUS	Sofia Shevchenko / Igor Eremenko	1877	2018/2019 season (100%)	405	350	250		
25	RUS	Sofia Shevchenko / Igor Eremenko	1877	2017/2018 season (70%)	230	179	(175)		
26	LTU	Allison Reed / Saulius Ambrulevičius	1865	2019/2020 season (100%)	293	262		250	198
26	LTU	Allison Reed / Saulius Ambrulevičius	1865	2018/2019 season (100%)	237	236		225	164
26	LTU	Allison Reed / Saulius Ambrulevičius	1865	2017/2018 season (70%)	(113)			(125)	(115)
27	UKR	Oleksandra Nazarova / Maxim Nikitin	1804	2019/2020 season (100%)	325			250	243
27	UKR	Oleksandra Nazarova / Maxim Nikitin	1804	2018/2019 season (100%)	(162)	191		250	
27	UKR	Oleksandra Nazarova / Maxim Nikitin	1804	2017/2018 season (70%)	205	165		175	(170)
28	RUS	Sofia Evdokimova / Egor Bazin	1746	2019/2020 season (100%)		236		203	
28	RUS	Sofia Evdokimova / Egor Bazin	1746	2018/2019 season (100%)	362	292		250	250
28	RUS	Sofia Evdokimova / Egor Bazin	1746	2017/2018 season (70%)				153	(142)
29	RUS	Betina Popova / Sergey Mozgov	1715	2019/2020 season (100%)		191		243	219
29	RUS	Betina Popova / Sergey Mozgov	1715	2018/2019 season (100%)		213	191	250	243
29	RUS	Betina Popova / Sergey Mozgov	1715	2017/2018 season (70%)		165		(210)	(170)
30	JPN	Misato Komatsubara / Tim Koleto	1650	2019/2020 season (100%)	293				
30	JPN	Misato Komatsubara / Tim Koleto	1650	2018/2019 season (100%)	362	191	191	243	243
30	JPN	Misato Komatsubara / Tim Koleto	1650	2017/2018 season (70%)	(228)			127	
31	UKR	Darya Popova / Volodymyr Byelikov	1647	2019/2020 season (100%)				182	164
31	UKR	Darya Popova / Volodymyr Byelikov	1647	2018/2019 season (100%)	174	203	182	203	198
31	UKR	Darya Popova / Volodymyr Byelikov	1647	2017/2018 season (70%)	122	115	104	(158)	
32	RUS	Arina Ushakova / Maxim Nekrasov	1594	2019/2020 season (100%)	365				
32	RUS	Arina Ushakova / Maxim Nekrasov	1594	2018/2019 season (100%)	328	315	250		
32	RUS	Arina Ushakova / Maxim Nekrasov	1594	2017/2018 season (70%)	(284)	175	161		
33	FRA	Adelina Galyavieva / Louis Thauron	1532	2019/2020 season (100%)	264	191		225	203
33	FRA	Adelina Galyavieva / Louis Thauron	1532	2018/2019 season (100%)	264			203	182
33	FRA	Adelina Galyavieva / Louis Thauron	1532	2017/2018 season (70%)					
34	ITA	Jasmine Tessari / Francesco Fioretti	1500	2019/2020 season (100%)	173			250	203
34	ITA	Jasmine Tessari / Francesco Fioretti	1500	2018/2019 season (100%)	214	191		250	219
34	ITA	Jasmine Tessari / Francesco Fioretti	1500	2017/2018 season (70%)	(98)			(158)	(158)
35	RUS	Ekaterina Bobrova / Dmitri Soloviev	1450	2019/2020 season (100%)					
35	RUS	Ekaterina Bobrova / Dmitri Soloviev	1450	2018/2019 season (100%)					
35	RUS	Ekaterina Bobrova / Dmitri Soloviev	1450	2017/2018 season (70%)	551	252	227	210	210
36	USA	Maia Shibutani / Alex Shibutani	1414	2019/2020 season (100%)					
36	USA	Maia Shibutani / Alex Shibutani	1414	2018/2019 season (100%)					
36	USA	Maia Shibutani / Alex Shibutani	1414	2017/2018 season (70%)	680	454	280		
37	ITA	Anna Cappellini / Luca Lanotte	1405	2019/2020 season (100%)					
37	ITA	Anna Cappellini / Luca Lanotte	1405	2018/2019 season (100%)					
37	ITA	Anna Cappellini / Luca Lanotte	1405	2017/2018 season (70%)	613	330	252	210	
38	RUS	Elizaveta Shanaeva / Devid Naryzhnyy	1346	2019/2020 season (100%)	405	284	250		
38	RUS	Elizaveta Shanaeva / Devid Naryzhnyy	1346	2018/2019 season (100%)		225	182		
38	RUS	Elizaveta Shanaeva / Devid Naryzhnyy	1346	2017/2018 season (70%)					
39	FRA	Loïcia Demougeot / Théo Le Mercier	1335	2019/2020 season (100%)	295	230	225		
39	FRA	Loïcia Demougeot / Théo Le Mercier	1335	2018/2019 season (100%)	239	182	164		
39	FRA	Loïcia Demougeot / Théo Le Mercier	1335	2017/2018 season (70%)	(80)	(84)	(68)		
40	FIN	Juulia Turkkila / Matthias Versluis	1346	2019/2020 season (100%)				250	
40	FIN	Juulia Turkkila / Matthias Versluis	1346	2018/2019 season (100%)	293	236		225	
40	FIN	Juulia Turkkila / Matthias Versluis	1346	2017/2018 season (70%)				115	(115)
41	HUN	Anna Yanovskaya / Ádám Lukács	1291	2019/2020 season (100%)					
41	HUN	Anna Yanovskaya / Ádám Lukács	1291	2018/2019 season (100%)	180	213		250	198
41	HUN	Anna Yanovskaya / Ádám Lukács	1291	2017/2018 season (70%)	150			158	142
42	GER	Katharina Müller / Tim Dieck	1282	2019/2020 season (100%)	237			250	182
42	GER	Katharina Müller / Tim Dieck	1282	2018/2019 season (100%)		213		225	(164)
42	GER	Katharina Müller / Tim Dieck	1282	2017/2018 season (70%)				175	(139)
43	CHN	Chen Hong / Sun Zhuoming	1280	2019/2020 season (100%)	325	191			
43	CHN	Chen Hong / Sun Zhuoming	1280	2018/2019 season (100%)	402			198	164
43	CHN	Chen Hong / Sun Zhuoming	1280	2017/2018 season (70%)					
44	RUS	Anastasia Shpilevaya / Grigory Smirnov	1260	2019/2020 season (100%)		236		219	178
44	RUS	Anastasia Shpilevaya / Grigory Smirnov	1260	2018/2019 season (100%)				250	219
44	RUS	Anastasia Shpilevaya / Grigory Smirnov	1260	2017/2018 season (70%)		158			
45	GBR	Robynne Tweedale / Joseph Buckland	1109	2019/2020 season (100%)				182	182
45	GBR	Robynne Tweedale / Joseph Buckland	1109	2018/2019 season (100%)	156	213		198	178
45	GBR	Robynne Tweedale / Joseph Buckland	1109	2017/2018 season (70%)				(115)	
46	AUS	Chantelle Kerry / Andrew Dodds	1104	2019/2020 season (100%)	214			182	
46	AUS	Chantelle Kerry / Andrew Dodds	1104	2018/2019 season (100%)	325			219	164
46	AUS	Chantelle Kerry / Andrew Dodds	1104	2017/2018 season (70%)	(166)				
47	CHN	Ning Wanqi / Wang Chao	1077	2019/2020 season (100%)	264			178	
47	CHN	Ning Wanqi / Wang Chao	1077	2018/2019 season (100%)	293			198	
47	CHN	Ning Wanqi / Wang Chao	1077	2017/2018 season (70%)		76	68		
48	GER	Shari Koch / Christian Nüchtern	1067	2019/2020 season (100%)				225	198
48	GER	Shari Koch / Christian Nüchtern	1067	2018/2019 season (100%)	200			225	219
48	GER	Shari Koch / Christian Nüchtern	1067	2017/2018 season (70%)				(142)	(142)
49	RUS	Diana Davis / Gleb Smolkin	981	2019/2020 season (100%)	328	225	225		
49	RUS	Diana Davis / Gleb Smolkin	981	2018/2019 season (100%)		203			
49	RUS	Diana Davis / Gleb Smolkin	981	2017/2018 season (70%)					
50	CAN	Emmy Bronsard / Aissa Bouaraguia	930	2019/2020 season (100%)	215	203	182		
50	CAN	Emmy Bronsard / Aissa Bouaraguia	930	2018/2019 season (100%)		182	148		
50	CAN	Emmy Bronsard / Aissa Bouaraguia	930	2017/2018 season (70%)					
51	USA	Caroline Green / Michael Parsons	912	2019/2020 season (100%)		213	213	243	243
51	USA	Caroline Green / Michael Parsons	912	2018/2019 season (100%)					
51	USA	Caroline Green / Michael Parsons	912	2017/2018 season (70%)					
52	CAN	Natalie D'Alessandro / Bruce Waddell	911	2019/2020 season (100%)	174	225	182		
52	CAN	Natalie D'Alessandro / Bruce Waddell	911	2018/2019 season (100%)		182	148		
52	CAN	Natalie D'Alessandro / Bruce Waddell	911	2017/2018 season (70%)		(104)			
53	CAN	Haley Sales / Nikolas Wamsteeker	878	2019/2020 season (100%)				203	
53	CAN	Haley Sales / Nikolas Wamsteeker	878	2018/2019 season (100%)				219	203
53	CAN	Haley Sales / Nikolas Wamsteeker	878	2017/2018 season (70%)	253				
54	CZE	Natálie Taschlerová / Filip Taschler	845	2019/2020 season (100%)	126	203	164	225	
54	CZE	Natálie Taschlerová / Filip Taschler	845	2018/2019 season (100%)	127				
54	CZE	Natálie Taschlerová / Filip Taschler	845	2017/2018 season (70%)	(58)				
55	AUS	Matilda Friend / William Badaoui	839	2019/2020 season (100%)	192			178	
55	AUS	Matilda Friend / William Badaoui	839	2018/2019 season (100%)	264	108	97		
55	AUS	Matilda Friend / William Badaoui	839	2017/2018 season (70%)	(150)				
56	GER	Jennifer Janse van Rensburg / Benjamin Steffan	820	2019/2020 season (100%)				219	198
56	GER	Jennifer Janse van Rensburg / Benjamin Steffan	820	2018/2019 season (100%)				225	178
56	GER	Jennifer Janse van Rensburg / Benjamin Steffan	820	2017/2018 season (70%)				(127)	(125)
57	ARM	Tina Garabedian / Simon Proulx-Sénécal	797	2019/2020 season (100%)	156			225	203
57	ARM	Tina Garabedian / Simon Proulx-Sénécal	797	2018/2019 season (100%)					
57	ARM	Tina Garabedian / Simon Proulx-Sénécal	797	2017/2018 season (70%)	88			125	
58	FRA	Evgeniia Lopareva / Geoffrey Brissaud	783	2019/2020 season (100%)	192			219	178
58	FRA	Evgeniia Lopareva / Geoffrey Brissaud	783	2018/2019 season (100%)	194				
58	FRA	Evgeniia Lopareva / Geoffrey Brissaud	783	2017/2018 season (70%)					
59	KOR	Yura Min / Daniel Eaton	766	2019/2020 season (100%)	402			182	182
59	KOR	Yura Min / Daniel Eaton	766	2018/2019 season (100%)					
59	KOR	Yura Min / Daniel Eaton	766	2017/2018 season (70%)					
60	POL	Justyna Plutowska / Jérémie Flemin	756	2019/2020 season (100%)				198	178
60	POL	Justyna Plutowska / Jérémie Flemin	756	2018/2019 season (100%)				198	182
60	POL	Justyna Plutowska / Jérémie Flemin	756	2017/2018 season (70%)					
61	UKR	Maria Golubtsova / Kirill Belobrov	752	2019/2020 season (100%)	127	164	133		
61	UKR	Maria Golubtsova / Kirill Belobrov	752	2018/2019 season (100%)	164	164			
61	UKR	Maria Golubtsova / Kirill Belobrov	752	2017/2018 season (70%)		(104)	(76)		
62	CAN	Molly Lanaghan / Dmitre Razgulajevs	743	2019/2020 season (100%)				219	164
62	CAN	Molly Lanaghan / Dmitre Razgulajevs	743	2018/2019 season (100%)				182	178
62	CAN	Molly Lanaghan / Dmitre Razgulajevs	743	2017/2018 season (70%)					
62	RUS	Ksenia Konkina / Pavel Drozd	743	2019/2020 season (100%)				270	270
62	RUS	Ksenia Konkina / Pavel Drozd	743	2018/2019 season (100%)				203	
62	RUS	Ksenia Konkina / Pavel Drozd	743	2017/2018 season (70%)					
64	BLR	Emiliya Kalehanova / Uladzislau Palkhouski	731	2019/2020 season (100%)					
64	BLR	Emiliya Kalehanova / Uladzislau Palkhouski	731	2018/2019 season (100%)	114	148	108	164	
64	BLR	Emiliya Kalehanova / Uladzislau Palkhouski	731	2017/2018 season (70%)		104	93		
65	CAN	Miku Makita / Tyler Gunara	723	2019/2020 season (100%)	239	182	182		
65	CAN	Miku Makita / Tyler Gunara	723	2018/2019 season (100%)		120			
65	CAN	Miku Makita / Tyler Gunara	723	2017/2018 season (70%)					
66	USA	Oona Brown / Gage Brown	719	2019/2020 season (100%)	194	164	133		
66	USA	Oona Brown / Gage Brown	719	2018/2019 season (100%)		120	108		
66	USA	Oona Brown / Gage Brown	719	2017/2018 season (70%)					
67	HUN	Emily Monaghan / Ilias Fourati	709	2019/2020 season (100%)				203	164
67	HUN	Emily Monaghan / Ilias Fourati	709	2018/2019 season (100%)				178	164
67	HUN	Emily Monaghan / Ilias Fourati	709	2017/2018 season (70%)					
68	CAN	Alicia Fabbri / Paul Ayer	708	2019/2020 season (100%)				178	
68	CAN	Alicia Fabbri / Paul Ayer	708	2018/2019 season (100%)	215	182	133		
68	CAN	Alicia Fabbri / Paul Ayer	708	2017/2018 season (70%)					
69	USA	Katarina Wolfkostin / Jeffrey Chen	612	2019/2020 season (100%)	266	182	164		
69	USA	Katarina Wolfkostin / Jeffrey Chen	612	2018/2019 season (100%)					
69	USA	Katarina Wolfkostin / Jeffrey Chen	612	2017/2018 season (70%)					
70	ITA	Francesca Righi / Aleksei Dubrovin	611	2019/2020 season (100%)		133	97		
70	ITA	Francesca Righi / Aleksei Dubrovin	611	2018/2019 season (100%)	141	120	120		
70	ITA	Francesca Righi / Aleksei Dubrovin	611	2017/2018 season (70%)					
71	FRA	Julia Wagret / Pierre Souquet-Basiege	578	2019/2020 season (100%)				198	198
71	FRA	Julia Wagret / Pierre Souquet-Basiege	578	2018/2019 season (100%)				182	
71	FRA	Julia Wagret / Pierre Souquet-Basiege	578	2017/2018 season (70%)					
72	GBR	Emily Rose Brown / James Hernandez	561	2019/2020 season (100%)	141	97			
72	GBR	Emily Rose Brown / James Hernandez	561	2018/2019 season (100%)		133	97		
72	GBR	Emily Rose Brown / James Hernandez	561	2017/2018 season (70%)		93			
73	FIN	Yuka Orihara / Juho Pirinen	546	2019/2020 season (100%)	140			203	203
73	FIN	Yuka Orihara / Juho Pirinen	546	2018/2019 season (100%)					
73	FIN	Yuka Orihara / Juho Pirinen	546	2017/2018 season (70%)					
74	GBR	Sasha Fear / George Waddell	524	2019/2020 season (100%)		120	120		
74	GBR	Sasha Fear / George Waddell	524	2018/2019 season (100%)	83	108			
74	GBR	Sasha Fear / George Waddell	524	2017/2018 season (70%)		93	(68)		
75	ITA	Chiara Calderone / Pietro Papetti	521	2019/2020 season (100%)					
75	ITA	Chiara Calderone / Pietro Papetti	521	2018/2019 season (100%)				225	
75	ITA	Chiara Calderone / Pietro Papetti	521	2017/2018 season (70%)	99	104	93		
76	RUS	Elizaveta Khudaiberdieva / Andrey Filatov	505	2019/2020 season (100%)		255	250		
76	RUS	Elizaveta Khudaiberdieva / Andrey Filatov	505	2018/2019 season (100%)					
76	RUS	Elizaveta Khudaiberdieva / Andrey Filatov	505	2017/2018 season (70%)					
77	BLR	Anna Kublikova / Yuri Hulitski	504	2019/2020 season (100%)					
77	BLR	Anna Kublikova / Yuri Hulitski	504	2018/2019 season (100%)	140			182	182
77	BLR	Anna Kublikova / Yuri Hulitski	504	2017/2018 season (70%)					
78	FRA	Lou Terreaux / Noé Perron	502	2019/2020 season (100%)	114	148	120		
78	FRA	Lou Terreaux / Noé Perron	502	2018/2019 season (100%)		120			
78	FRA	Lou Terreaux / Noé Perron	502	2017/2018 season (70%)					
79	CAN	Nadiia Bashynska / Peter Beaumont	493	2019/2020 season (100%)		203	182		
79	CAN	Nadiia Bashynska / Peter Beaumont	493	2018/2019 season (100%)		108			
79	CAN	Nadiia Bashynska / Peter Beaumont	493	2017/2018 season (70%)					
80	RUS	Annabelle Morozov / Andrei Bagin	489	2019/2020 season (100%)				270	219
80	RUS	Annabelle Morozov / Andrei Bagin	489	2018/2019 season (100%)					
80	RUS	Annabelle Morozov / Andrei Bagin	489	2017/2018 season (70%)					
81	JPN	Utana Yoshida / Shingo Nishiyama	453	2019/2020 season (100%)	157	148	148		
81	JPN	Utana Yoshida / Shingo Nishiyama	453	2018/2019 season (100%)					
81	JPN	Utana Yoshida / Shingo Nishiyama	453	2017/2018 season (70%)					
82	RUS	Sofya Tyutyunina / Alexander Shustitskiy	428	2019/2020 season (100%)		225	203		
82	RUS	Sofya Tyutyunina / Alexander Shustitskiy	428	2018/2019 season (100%)					
82	RUS	Sofya Tyutyunina / Alexander Shustitskiy	428	2017/2018 season (70%)					
83	USA	Chloe Lewis / Logan Bye	416	2019/2020 season (100%)					
83	USA	Chloe Lewis / Logan Bye	416	2018/2019 season (100%)					
83	USA	Chloe Lewis / Logan Bye	416	2017/2018 season (70%)	186	115	115		
84	RUS	Ekaterina Katashinskaia / Aleksandr Vaskovich	406	2019/2020 season (100%)		203	203		
84	RUS	Ekaterina Katashinskaia / Aleksandr Vaskovich	406	2018/2019 season (100%)					
84	RUS	Ekaterina Katashinskaia / Aleksandr Vaskovich	406	2017/2018 season (70%)					
85	CAN	Irina Galiyanova / Grayson Lochhead	405	2019/2020 season (100%)		164	108		
85	CAN	Irina Galiyanova / Grayson Lochhead	405	2018/2019 season (100%)		133			
85	CAN	Irina Galiyanova / Grayson Lochhead	405	2017/2018 season (70%)					
86	ITA	Carolina Portesi Peroni / Michael Chrastecky	402	2019/2020 season (100%)	93	133	108		
86	ITA	Carolina Portesi Peroni / Michael Chrastecky	402	2018/2019 season (100%)					
86	ITA	Carolina Portesi Peroni / Michael Chrastecky	402	2017/2018 season (70%)		68			
87	ITA	Sara Campanini / Francesco Riva	392	2019/2020 season (100%)		108			
87	ITA	Sara Campanini / Francesco Riva	392	2018/2019 season (100%)		164	120		
87	ITA	Sara Campanini / Francesco Riva	392	2017/2018 season (70%)					
88	ITA	Carolina Moscheni / Andrea Fabbri	364	2019/2020 season (100%)					
88	ITA	Carolina Moscheni / Andrea Fabbri	364	2018/2019 season (100%)				182	182
88	ITA	Carolina Moscheni / Andrea Fabbri	364	2017/2018 season (70%)					
89	AUS	Holly Harris / Jason Chan	362	2019/2020 season (100%)	362				
89	AUS	Holly Harris / Jason Chan	362	2018/2019 season (100%)					
89	AUS	Holly Harris / Jason Chan	362	2017/2018 season (70%)					
90	HUN	Villő Marton / Danyil Semko	360	2019/2020 season (100%)	75	120			
90	HUN	Villő Marton / Danyil Semko	360	2018/2019 season (100%)					
90	HUN	Villő Marton / Danyil Semko	360	2017/2018 season (70%)	89	76			
91	HUN	Leia Dozzi / Michael Albert Valdez	346	2019/2020 season (100%)				182	164
91	HUN	Leia Dozzi / Michael Albert Valdez	346	2018/2019 season (100%)					
91	HUN	Leia Dozzi / Michael Albert Valdez	346	2017/2018 season (70%)					
92	USA	Ella Ales / Daniel Tsarik	312	2019/2020 season (100%)		164	148		
92	USA	Ella Ales / Daniel Tsarik	312	2018/2019 season (100%)					
92	USA	Ella Ales / Daniel Tsarik	312	2017/2018 season (70%)					
93	USA	Molly Cesanek / Yehor Yehorov	296	2019/2020 season (100%)		148	148		
93	USA	Molly Cesanek / Yehor Yehorov	296	2018/2019 season (100%)					
93	USA	Molly Cesanek / Yehor Yehorov	296	2017/2018 season (70%)					
93	USA	Sophia Elder / Christopher Elder	296	2019/2020 season (100%)					
93	USA	Sophia Elder / Christopher Elder	296	2018/2019 season (100%)		148	148		
93	USA	Sophia Elder / Christopher Elder	296	2017/2018 season (70%)					
95	USA	Katerina DelCamp / Ian Somerville	279	2019/2020 season (100%)		182	97		
95	USA	Katerina DelCamp / Ian Somerville	279	2018/2019 season (100%)					
95	USA	Katerina DelCamp / Ian Somerville	279	2017/2018 season (70%)					
96	SUI	Victoria Manni / Carlo Röthlisberger	277	2019/2020 season (100%)	113				
96	SUI	Victoria Manni / Carlo Röthlisberger	277	2018/2019 season (100%)				164	
96	SUI	Victoria Manni / Carlo Röthlisberger	277	2017/2018 season (70%)					
97	FRA	Marie Dupayage / Thomas Nabais	266	2019/2020 season (100%)		133	133		
97	FRA	Marie Dupayage / Thomas Nabais	266	2018/2019 season (100%)					
97	FRA	Marie Dupayage / Thomas Nabais	266	2017/2018 season (70%)					
98	CAN	Olivia McIsaac / Corey Circelli	241	2019/2020 season (100%)		108			
98	CAN	Olivia McIsaac / Corey Circelli	241	2018/2019 season (100%)		133			
98	CAN	Olivia McIsaac / Corey Circelli	241	2017/2018 season (70%)					
98	ISR	Mariia Nosovitskaya / Mikhail Nosovitskiy	241	2019/2020 season (100%)		133	108		
98	ISR	Mariia Nosovitskaya / Mikhail Nosovitskiy	241	2018/2019 season (100%)					
98	ISR	Mariia Nosovitskaya / Mikhail Nosovitskiy	241	2017/2018 season (70%)					
100	JPN	Rikako Fukase / Eichu Cho	237	2019/2020 season (100%)	237				
100	JPN	Rikako Fukase / Eichu Cho	237	2018/2019 season (100%)					
100	JPN	Rikako Fukase / Eichu Cho	237	2017/2018 season (70%)					
101	GER	Anne-Marie Wolf / Max Liebers	217	2019/2020 season (100%)		120	97		
101	GER	Anne-Marie Wolf / Max Liebers	217	2018/2019 season (100%)					
101	GER	Anne-Marie Wolf / Max Liebers	217	2017/2018 season (70%)					
102	FRA	Natacha Lagouge / Arnaud Caffa	203	2019/2020 season (100%)				203	
102	FRA	Natacha Lagouge / Arnaud Caffa	203	2018/2019 season (100%)					
102	FRA	Natacha Lagouge / Arnaud Caffa	203	2017/2018 season (70%)					
102	RUS	Angelina Lazareva / Maksim Prokofiev	203	2019/2020 season (100%)		203			
102	RUS	Angelina Lazareva / Maksim Prokofiev	203	2018/2019 season (100%)					
102	RUS	Angelina Lazareva / Maksim Prokofiev	203	2017/2018 season (70%)					
102	RUS	Alla Loboda / Anton Shibnev	203	2019/2020 season (100%)					
102	RUS	Alla Loboda / Anton Shibnev	203	2018/2019 season (100%)				203	
102	RUS	Alla Loboda / Anton Shibnev	203	2017/2018 season (70%)					
105	PRK	Phyo Yong-myong / Choe Min	178	2019/2020 season (100%)					
105	PRK	Phyo Yong-myong / Choe Min	178	2018/2019 season (100%)				178	
105	PRK	Phyo Yong-myong / Choe Min	178	2017/2018 season (70%)					
106	KAZ	Maxine Weatherby / Temirlan Yerzhanov	173	2019/2020 season (100%)	173				
106	KAZ	Maxine Weatherby / Temirlan Yerzhanov	173	2018/2019 season (100%)					
106	KAZ	Maxine Weatherby / Temirlan Yerzhanov	173	2017/2018 season (70%)					
107	CYP	Angelina Kudryavtseva / Ilia Karankevich	165	2019/2020 season (100%)	68	97			
107	CYP	Angelina Kudryavtseva / Ilia Karankevich	165	2018/2019 season (100%)					
107	CYP	Angelina Kudryavtseva / Ilia Karankevich	165	2017/2018 season (70%)					
108	EST	Katerina Bunina / Artur Gruzdev	164	2019/2020 season (100%)		164			
108	EST	Katerina Bunina / Artur Gruzdev	164	2018/2019 season (100%)					
108	EST	Katerina Bunina / Artur Gruzdev	164	2017/2018 season (70%)					
108	RUS	Ekaterina Andreeva / Ivan Desyatov	164	2019/2020 season (100%)					
108	RUS	Ekaterina Andreeva / Ivan Desyatov	164	2018/2019 season (100%)		164			
108	RUS	Ekaterina Andreeva / Ivan Desyatov	164	2017/2018 season (70%)					
108	RUS	Anastasia Shakun / Daniil Ragimov	164	2019/2020 season (100%)					
108	RUS	Anastasia Shakun / Daniil Ragimov	164	2018/2019 season (100%)				164	
108	RUS	Anastasia Shakun / Daniil Ragimov	164	2017/2018 season (70%)					
108	RUS	Julia Tultseva / Anatoliy Belovodchenko	164	2019/2020 season (100%)				164	
108	RUS	Julia Tultseva / Anatoliy Belovodchenko	164	2018/2019 season (100%)					
108	RUS	Julia Tultseva / Anatoliy Belovodchenko	164	2017/2018 season (70%)					
112	RUS	Tamara Zhukova / Daniil Karpov	148	2019/2020 season (100%)		148			
112	RUS	Tamara Zhukova / Daniil Karpov	148	2018/2019 season (100%)					
112	RUS	Tamara Zhukova / Daniil Karpov	148	2017/2018 season (70%)					
112	USA	Alina Efimova / Alexander Petrov	148	2019/2020 season (100%)					
112	USA	Alina Efimova / Alexander Petrov	148	2018/2019 season (100%)		148			
112	USA	Alina Efimova / Alexander Petrov	148	2017/2018 season (70%)					
114	USA	Jocelyn Haines / James Koszuta	133	2019/2020 season (100%)					
114	USA	Jocelyn Haines / James Koszuta	133	2018/2019 season (100%)		133			
114	USA	Jocelyn Haines / James Koszuta	133	2017/2018 season (70%)					
115	GER	Lara Luft / Stephano Valentino Schuster	120	2019/2020 season (100%)		120			
115	GER	Lara Luft / Stephano Valentino Schuster	120	2018/2019 season (100%)					
115	GER	Lara Luft / Stephano Valentino Schuster	120	2017/2018 season (70%)					
115	RUS	Svetlana Lizunova / Alexander Vakhnov	120	2019/2020 season (100%)		120			
115	RUS	Svetlana Lizunova / Alexander Vakhnov	120	2018/2019 season (100%)					
115	RUS	Svetlana Lizunova / Alexander Vakhnov	120	2017/2018 season (70%)					
117	CAN	Jessica Li / Jacob Richmond	108	2019/2020 season (100%)		108			
117	CAN	Jessica Li / Jacob Richmond	108	2018/2019 season (100%)					
117	CAN	Jessica Li / Jacob Richmond	108	2017/2018 season (70%)					
117	KAZ	Anna Shnaider / Fedor Varlamov	108	2019/2020 season (100%)		108			
117	KAZ	Anna Shnaider / Fedor Varlamov	108	2018/2019 season (100%)					
117	KAZ	Anna Shnaider / Fedor Varlamov	108	2017/2018 season (70%)					
119	CHN	Chen Xizi / Xing Jianing	97	2019/2020 season (100%)					
119	CHN	Chen Xizi / Xing Jianing	97	2018/2019 season (100%)		97			
119	CHN	Chen Xizi / Xing Jianing	97	2017/2018 season (70%)					
119	FRA	Emily Bratti / Mathieu Couyras	97	2019/2020 season (100%)		97			
119	FRA	Emily Bratti / Mathieu Couyras	97	2018/2019 season (100%)					
119	FRA	Emily Bratti / Mathieu Couyras	97	2017/2018 season (70%)					
119	FRA	Célina Fradji / Jean-Hans Fourneaux	97	2019/2020 season (100%)		97			
119	FRA	Célina Fradji / Jean-Hans Fourneaux	97	2018/2019 season (100%)					
119	FRA	Célina Fradji / Jean-Hans Fourneaux	97	2017/2018 season (70%)					
122	USA	Isabella Amoia / Luca Becker	84	2019/2020 season (100%)					
122	USA	Isabella Amoia / Luca Becker	84	2018/2019 season (100%)					
122	USA	Isabella Amoia / Luca Becker	84	2017/2018 season (70%)		84			
123	ESP	Sofia Val / Linus Colmor Jepsen	83	2019/2020 season (100%)	83				
123	ESP	Sofia Val / Linus Colmor Jepsen	83	2018/2019 season (100%)					
123	ESP	Sofia Val / Linus Colmor Jepsen	83	2017/2018 season (70%)					
124	CHN	Guo Yuzhu / Zhao Pengkun	76	2019/2020 season (100%)					
124	CHN	Guo Yuzhu / Zhao Pengkun	76	2018/2019 season (100%)					
124	CHN	Guo Yuzhu / Zhao Pengkun	76	2017/2018 season (70%)		76			
125	LTU	Mira Polishook / Deividas Kizala	75	2019/2020 season (100%)					
125	LTU	Mira Polishook / Deividas Kizala	75	2018/2019 season (100%)	75				
125	LTU	Mira Polishook / Deividas Kizala	75	2017/2018 season (70%)					
126	ARM	Viktoriia Azroian / Aleksandr Siroshtan	68	2019/2020 season (100%)					
126	ARM	Viktoriia Azroian / Aleksandr Siroshtan	68	2018/2019 season (100%)	68				
126	ARM	Viktoriia Azroian / Aleksandr Siroshtan	68	2017/2018 season (70%)					

== See also ==
- ISU World Standings
- ISU Season's World Ranking
- 2019–20 figure skating season
