= I Stand =

I Stand may refer to:

- I Stand (album), an album by Idina Menzel
  - "I Stand" (Idina Menzel song), a song from the album
  - I Stand tour, the tour by Idina Menzel for the album
- "I Stand" (song), a song by Gabriela Gunčíková

== See also ==
- I Stand Alone (disambiguation)
