= Shingo Nishiyama =

Japanese figure skater (born 2002)

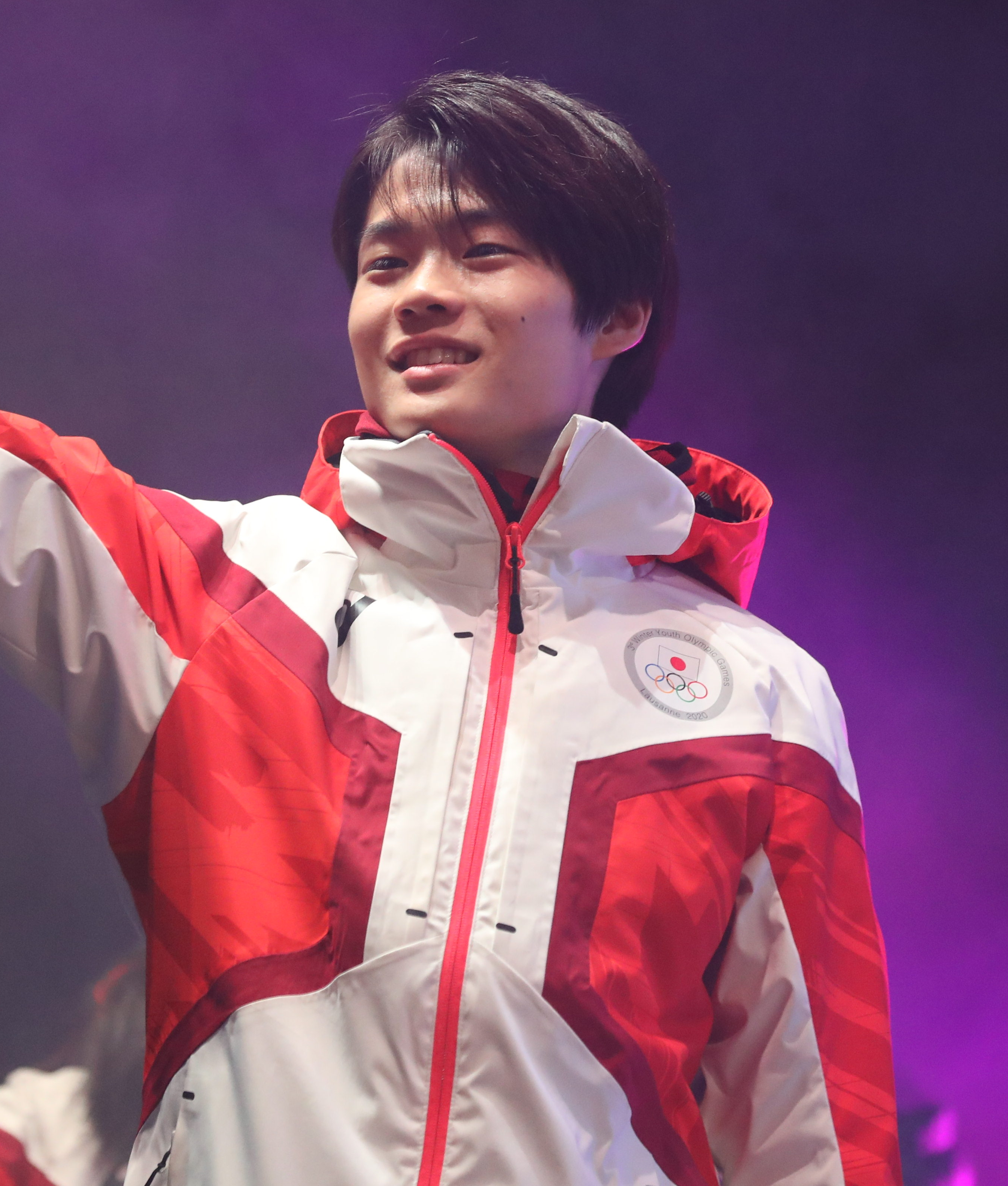
- Nishiyama at the 2020 Winter Youth Olympics

Personal information
- Native name: 西山 真瑚
- Born: January 24, 2002 (age 24) Tokyo, Japan
- Home town: Tokyo
- Height: 1.73 m (5 ft 8 in)

Figure skating career
- Country: Japan
- Partner: Rika Kihira (since 2025); Azusa Tanaka (2023–25); Ayumi Takanami (2021–22); Utana Yoshida (2019–21)
- Coach: Romain Haguenauer; Marie-France Dubreuil; Patrice Lauzon
- Skating club: OrientalBio
- Began skating: 2008
Japan Championships
| Silver medal – second place | 2023–24 Nagano | Ice dance |
| Silver medal – second place | 2024–25 Osaka | Ice dance |
| Bronze medal – third place | 2021–22 Saitama | Ice dance |
Winter Youth Olympics
| Gold medal – first place | 2020 Lausanne | Team |

Shingo Nishiyama (西山 真瑚, Nishiyama Shingo; born January 24, 2002) is a Japanese ice dancer. He and former partner Azusa Tanaka are the 2025 Asian Winter Games bronze medalists and two-time Japanese national silver medalists (2023–24, 2024–25).

With his other former skating partner, Utana Yoshida, he was a two-time Japanese national junior ice dance champion (2019–20, 2020–21) and a 2020 Winter Youth Olympics champion in the team event. He also competed for one season with Ayumi Takanami, winning the bronze medal at the 2021–22 Japan Championships.

== Personal life ==
Shingo Nishiyama was born on January 24, 2002, in Tokyo, Japan. He has an older sister. Nishiyama's favorite subjects in school are Japanese history and world history. He attended Hinode Gakuen, a correspondence school recommended by fellow Japanese ice dancer Aru Tateno. Nishiyama was accepted into Waseda University's School of Human Sciences to study sports education and psychology, as he wants to become a skating coach. He is related to Japanese ballerina Akane Takada through his mother's side and has worked with her on improving body movement.

Nishiyama looks up to two-time Olympic champion, Yuzuru Hanyu.

== Career ==
=== Early career ===
Nishiyama began skating in 2008 at the age of six, at the suggestion of his first coach Masahiro Kawagoe, who saw him attending a lesson at Citizens' Plaza in Shinjuku, Tokyo. He previously trained with Yutaka Higuchi in Tokyo, and qualified to compete at the Japan Championships each year. He was invited to skate in the gala at the 2013 World Team Trophy as the Japanese national novice champion in the same season.

Nishiyama moved to Canada alone at age fourteen to train with Brian Orser, Tracy Wilson, and Ghislain Briand at the Toronto Cricket, Skating and Curling Club, despite not knowing the language. After he suffered a hip injury in the fall of 2018 and was unable to practice jumps, another coach at the club, Andrew Hallam, suggested that he consider switching to ice dance. Despite Nishiyama's initial reluctance to switch disciplines, he drew inspiration from Japanese sprinter Dai Tamesue's book to adjust his mindset.

Nishiyama teamed up with Utana Yoshida in early 2019 after a tryout arranged by the Japan Skating Federation in the fall of 2018, and she moved to train with him and his coaches at the Toronto Cricket, Skating and Curling Club in Canada in February 2019.

=== Partnership with Utana Yoshida ===
==== 2019–2020 season ====
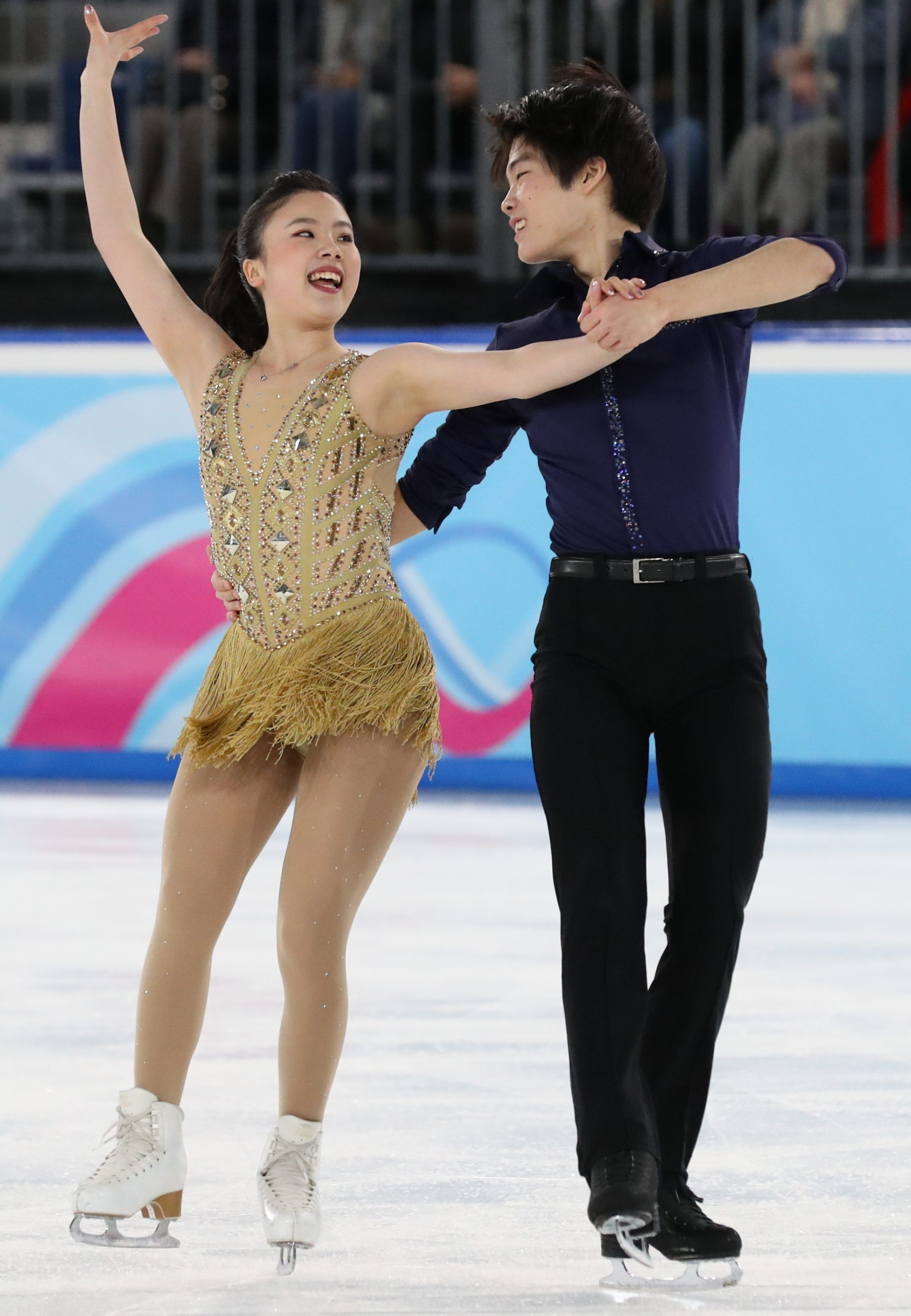
Yoshida/Nishiyama at the 2020 Winter Youth Olympics

In their first season as a partnership, Yoshida/Nishiyama placed sixth at both 2019 JGP United States and 2019 JGP Italy. They then won gold at the Western Sectional and advanced to the 2019–20 Japan Junior Championships, where they again won gold, ahead of Ayumi Takanami / Yoshimitsu Ikeda. As a result, Yoshida/Nishiyama were assigned to the 2020 World Junior Championships and the 2020 Winter Youth Olympics. They were invited to skate in the gala at the 2019 NHK Trophy as junior national champion.

At the 2020 Winter Youth Olympics, Yoshida / Nishiyama placed sixth in the ice dance event with a new personal best, following a sixth-place rhythm dance and a fourth-place free dance. They were chosen by draw to be part of Team Courage for the mixed-NOC team event, alongside singles' skaters Arlet Levandi of Estonia and Ksenia Sinitsyna of Russia and pairs team Alina Butaeva / Luka Berulava of Georgia. Yoshida/Nishiyama won the free dance portion of the team event, ahead of both the silver and bronze medalists from the individual ice dance event, to help Team Courage win the gold medal.

Yoshida/Nishiyama set a goal of being in the top ten at the 2020 World Junior Championships. They placed twelfth in Tallinn.

==== 2020–2021 season ====
Due to the COVID-19 pandemic, the Junior Grand Prix, where Yoshida/Nishiyama would have competed, was cancelled. In November, they won their second consecutive junior national title at the 2020–21 Japan Junior Championships.

Yoshida/Nishiyama announced their split in January 2021.

=== Partnership with Ayumi Takanami ===
==== 2021–2022 season ====
Nishiyama indicated that he would continue in ice dance, rather than returning to singles. In March 2021, he announced his new partnership with fellow Waseda University skater Ayumi Takanami.

Takanami/Nishiyama made their competitive debut at the 2021–22 Japan Championships, winning the bronze medal. Their partnership would soon dissolve afterwards.

=== Partnership with Azusa Tanaka ===
==== 2022–2023 season ====
Nishiyama competed in the men's singles during the 2022-23 season, coming sixteenth at the 2022–23 Japan Championships.

On 6 May 2023, Nishiyama announced that he and former Japanese single skater Azusa Tanaka had formed an ice dance partnership and would be training at the Ice Academy of Montreal in Montreal, Canada.

==== 2023–2024 season ====
Tanaka/Nishiyama made their international competitive debut on the Challenger circuit at the 2023 CS Golden Spin of Zagreb, coming ninth. They next competed at the 2023–24 Japan Championships, which proved to be a tight contest between them and two other senior teams. Tanaka/Nishiyama won the rhythm dance, finishing ahead of four-time national champions Komatsubara/Koleto and the new team Yoshida/Morita. However, they were third in the free dance, and finished second overall. The team said they were satisfied to have made it onto the podium, noting their rapid progress in the short time since partnering.

With the close result at the national championships, the Japan Skating Federation opted to postpone assigning Japan's lone berth at the 2024 World Championships pending the results of all three teams at the 2024 Four Continents Championships. Traveling to Shanghai to compete, Tanaka/Nishiyama finished eleventh overall, third among the Japanese teams.

==== 2024–25 season ====
Although initially assigned to compete at the 2024 CS Nebelhorn Trophy in September, Tanaka/Nishiyama would withdraw from the event. Their first event of the season was the 2024 NHK Trophy, where they finished tenth.

In late December, Tanaka/Nishiyama won the silver medal at the 2024–25 Japan Championships behind Yoshida/Morita. They were subsequently named to the Four Continents team.

Going on to compete at the 2025 Asian Winter Games in Harbin, China, Tanaka/Nishiyama won the bronze medal. They subsequently finished the season by competing at the 2025 Four Continents Championships in Seoul, South Korea, placing eleventh overall. Throughout the season, Tanaka struggled with a rib injury.

In July 2025, it was announced that Tanaka/Nishiyama had split due to Tanaka's decision to retire from competitive figure skating.

=== Partnership with Rika Kihira ===
==== 2025–26 season: Debut of Kihira/Nishiyama ====
In September 2025, it was announced that Nishiyama had teamed up with singles skater Rika Kihira and that the duo would train at the Ice Academy of Montreal, coached by Romain Haguenauer, Marie-France Dubreuil, and Patrice Lauzon.

In late October, Kihira/Nishiyama debuted as a team at the 2025 Western Sectional Championships, a qualifying competition for the Japanese National Championships, where they won the bronze medal. Prior to the event, Kihira suffered a minor rib fracture.

In late December, Kihira/Nishiyama competed at the 2025–26 Japan Championships, where they finished in fourth place.

==== 2026–27 season ====
Kihira/Nishiyama debuted internationally at the 2026 Kinoshita Group Cup, where they placed 8th.

== Programs ==
=== Ice dance with Rika Kihira ===
| Season | Short program | Free skating | Exhibition |
|---|---|---|---|
| 2026–2027 | golden hour (Fujii Kaze Remix) by JVKE & Fujii Kaze; this is what falling in love feels like by JVKE choreo. by Romain Haguenauer | Mon Dieu by Édith Piaf performed by Patricia Kaas; Song for the Little Sparrow by Patricia Kaas choreo. by Romain Haguenauer | |
| 2025–2026 | Mambo No. 5 (A Little Bit Of...) by Lou Bega; Scatman & Hatman by Scatman John & Lou Bega choreo. by Romain Haguenauer | Princess Mononoke; I. The Legend Of Ashitaka; II. TA TA RI GAMI; V. Mononoke Hime; I. The Legend Of Ashitaka by Joe Hisaishi & New Japan Philharmonic World Dream Orchestra choreo. by Romain Haguenauer & Marie-France Dubreuil | |

=== Ice dance with Azusa Tanaka ===
| Season | Rhythm dance | Free dance | Exhibition |
|---|---|---|---|
| 2024–2025 | September by Earth, Wind & Fire; Sir Duke by Stevie Wonder; Land of a Thousand Dances by Chris Kenner & Fats Domino performed by Wilson Pickett choreo. by Romain Haguenauer | Für Elise by Ludwig van Beethoven; Für Elise Jam by The Piano Guys & Ludwig van Beethoven choreo. by Romain Haguenauer | Super Mario; Mario Bros. by Stryker Pose & Koji Kondo; Underground; Airship (from Super Mario Bros.) by Retro Crowd & Koji Kondo; Super Mario Bros by Stryker Pose & Koji Kondo; Fever (from Dr. Mario) by Retro Crowd & Koji Kondo choreo. by Romain Haguenauer |
| 2023–2024 | Super Mario; Mario Bros. by Stryker Pose & Koji Kondo; Underground; Airship (from Super Mario Bros.) by Retro Crowd & Koji Kondo; Super Mario Bros by Stryker Pose & Koji Kondo; Fever (from Dr. Mario) by Retro Crowd & Koji Kondo choreo. by Romain Haguenauer | Giselle; Introduction; Act I: Retour des Vendangeurs - No. 4(bis) Valse; Act I: Pas de Deux - No. 5(bis) La Chasse (II); Act I: Galop by Adolphe Adam performed by London Symphony Orchestra & Anatole Fistoulari choreo. by Romain Haguenauer | |

=== Ice dance with Utana Yoshida ===
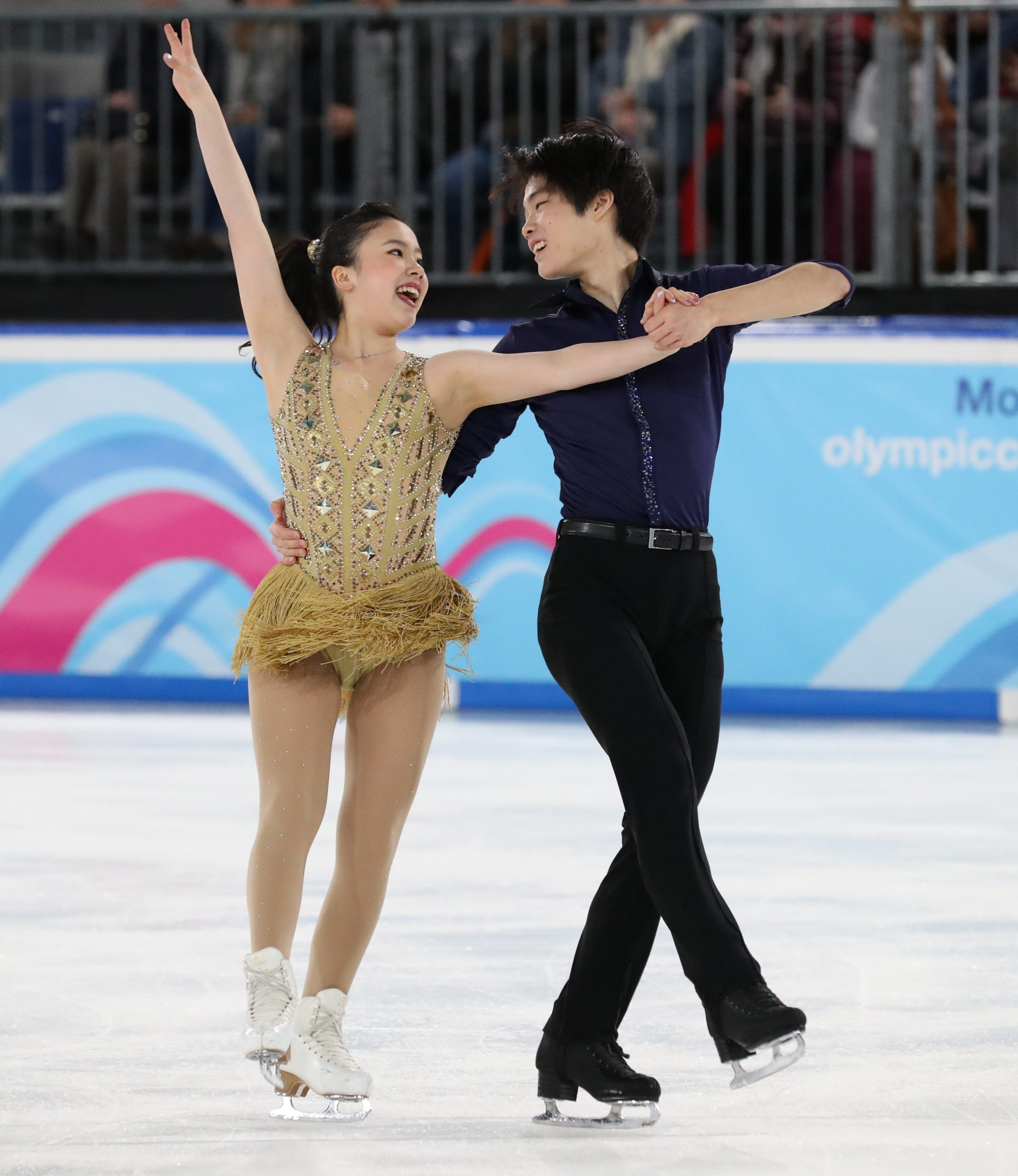
Yoshida/Nishiyama at the 2020 Winter Youth Olympics

| Season | Rhythm dance | Free dance | Exhibition |
|---|---|---|---|
| 2020–2021 | Charleston: One; Foxtrot: I Can Do That; Foxtrot: Medley (from A Chorus Line) by Marvin Hamlisch choreo. by Aaron Lowe & Megan Wing | Entree of Basil; Pas de Deux (from Don Quixote) by Léon Minkus choreo. by Romain Haguenauer | Hip Hip Chin Chin; Charleston: One; Foxtrot: I Can Do That; Foxtrot: Medley (from A Chorus Line) by Marvin Hamlisch choreo. by Aaron Lowe & Megan Wing |
| 2019–2020 | Charleston: One; Foxtrot: I Can Do That; Foxtrot: Medley (from A Chorus Line) by Marvin Hamlisch choreo. by Aaron Lowe & Megan Wing | Entree of Basil; Pas de Deux (from Don Quixote) by Léon Minkus choreo. by Romain Haguenauer | |

=== Singles skating ===
| Season | Short program | Free skating |
|---|---|---|
| 2022–2023 | That's Life by Frank Sinatra choreo. by Joey Russell, Shingo Nishiyama | New World Symphony by Jennifer Thomas; Anthem (from Chess) by Josh Groban choreo. by Joey Russell |
| 2021–2022 | | |
| 2020–2021 | That's Life by Frank Sinatra choreo. by Joey Russell, Shingo Nishiyama | East of Eden choreo. by David Wilson |
| 2019–2020 | Friend Like Me (from Aladdin) performed by Robin Williams choreo. by Joey Russell | East of Eden choreo. by David Wilson |
| 2018–2019 | El Choclo by Ángel Villoldo choreo. by Joey Russell | East of Eden choreo. by David Wilson |
| 2017–2018 | Por una cabeza by Carlos Gardel | Rhapsody on a Theme of Paganini by Sergei Rachmaninoff choreo. by David Wilson |
| 2016–2017 | | The Artist by Ludovic Bource choreo. by Kenji Miyamoto |
| 2015–2016 | | The Artist by Ludovic Bource choreo. by Kenji Miyamoto |

== Competitive highlights ==
- GP – Event of the ISU Grand Prix Series
- JGP – Event of the ISU Junior Grand Prix Series
- CS – Event of the ISU Challenger Series
- TBD – Assigned
- WD – Withdrew from competition

=== Ice dance with Rika Kihira ===
ISU personal best scores in the +5/-5 GOE System
| Segment | Type | Score | Event |
|---|---|---|---|
| Total | TSS | 156.86 | 2026 CS Kinoshita Group Cup |
| Rhythm dance | TSS | 61.37 | 2026 CS Kinoshita Group Cup |
| Rhythm dance | TES | 34.84 | 2026 CS Kinoshita Group Cup |
| Rhythm dance | PCS | 26.53 | 2026 CS Kinoshita Group Cup |
| Free dance | TSS | 95.49 | 2026 CS Kinoshita Group Cup |
| Free dance | TES | 52.79 | 2026 CS Kinoshita Group Cup |
| Free dance | PCS | 42.70 | 2026 CS Kinoshita Group Cup |

Competition placements at senior level
| Season | 2025–26 | 2026–27 |
|---|---|---|
| GP NHK Trophy | | TBD |
| CS Kinoshita Group Cup | | 8th |
| Japan Championships | 4th | |

=== Ice dance with Azusa Tanaka ===
International
| Event | 23–24 | 24–25 | 25–26 |
|---|---|---|---|
| Four Continents | 11th | 11th | |
| GP NHK Trophy | | 10th | WD |
| CS Golden Spin | 9th | | |
| CS Nebelhorn Trophy | | WD | |
| Asian Winter Games | | 3rd | |
National
| Japan | 2nd | 2nd | |

=== Ice dance with Ayumi Takanami ===
National
| Event | 21–22 |
|---|---|
| Japan Champ. | 3rd |

=== Ice dance with Utana Yoshida ===
International: Junior
| Event | 19–20 | 20–21 |
|---|---|---|
| Junior Worlds | 12th | |
| Youth Olympics | 6th | |
| JGP Italy | 6th | |
| JGP United States | 6th | |
| Bavarian Open | 6th | |
National
| Japan Junior Champ. | 1st | 1st |
| Western Sect | 1st J | 1st J |
Team events
| Youth Olympics | 1st T 1st P | |
T = Team result; P = Personal result. Medals awarded for team result only. Levels: J = Junior

=== Singles skating ===
National
| Event | 11–12 | 12–13 | 13–14 | 14–15 | 15–16 | 16–17 | 17–18 | 18–19 | 19–20 | 20–21 | 21–22 | 22–23 |
|---|---|---|---|---|---|---|---|---|---|---|---|---|
| Japan Champ. | | | | | | | | | | | | 16th |
| Japan Junior | | | | 25th | 17th | 16th | 9th | | 9th | | | |
| Japan Novice | 2nd B | 1st B | 3rd A | 4th A | | | | | | | | |
| Eastern Sect. | | | | | 5th J | 1st J | 5th J | | 5th J | | | 4th |
| Tokyo Reg. | 1st B | 1st B | 1st A | 1st A | 3rd J | 3rd J | 1st J | | 2nd J | | | 3rd |
Levels: A = Novice A; B = Novice B; J = Junior

== Detailed results ==
=== Ice dance with Rika Kihira ===
Results in the 2026–27 season
| Date | Event | RD | | FD | | Total | |
| Date | Event | P | Score | P | Score | P | Score |
|---|---|---|---|---|---|---|---|
| Sep 4–6, 2026 | (Japan) 2026 Kinoshita Group Cup | 8 | 61.37 | 9 | 95.49 | 8 | 156.86 |
| Nov 27–29, 2026 | (Japan) 2026 NHK Trophy | | | | | | TBD |

Results in the 2025–26 season
| Date | Event | RD | | FD | | Total | |
| Date | Event | P | Score | P | Score | P | Score |
|---|---|---|---|---|---|---|---|
| Dec 18–21, 2025 | 2025–26 Japan Championships | 3 | 57.44 | 4 | 86.97 | 4 | 144.41 |

=== Ice dance with Azusa Tanaka ===
Results in the 2024-25 season
| Date | Event | SP | | FS | | Total | |
| Date | Event | P | Score | P | Score | P | Score |
|---|---|---|---|---|---|---|---|
| Nov 8–10, 2024 | (Japan) 2024 NHK Trophy | 10 | 59.15 | 10 | 92.12 | 10 | 151.27 |
| Dec 19–22, 2024 | 2024–25 Japan Championships | 2 | 66.03 | 2 | 102.89 | 2 | 168.92 |
| Feb 11–13, 2025 | (China) 2025 Asian Winter Games | 3 | 63.21 | 3 | 100.50 | 3 | 163.71 |
| Feb 19–23, 2025 | (South Korea) 2025 Four Continents Championships | 12 | 59.84 | 10 | 96.55 | 11 | 156.39 |

Results in the 2023-24 season
| Date | Event | SP | | FS | | Total | |
| Date | Event | P | Score | P | Score | P | Score |
|---|---|---|---|---|---|---|---|
| Dec 6–9, 2023 | (Croatia) 2023 CS Golden Spin | 10 | 61.86 | 9 | 96.83 | 9 | 158.69 |
| Dec 20–24, 2023 | 2023–24 Japan Championships | 1 | 71.08 | 3 | 105.35 | 2 | 176.43 |
| Jan 30 – Feb 4, 2024 | (China) 2024 Four Continents Championships | 11 | 62.09 | 12 | 95.54 | 11 | 157.63 |

=== Ice dance with Utana Yoshida ===
==== Junior results ====
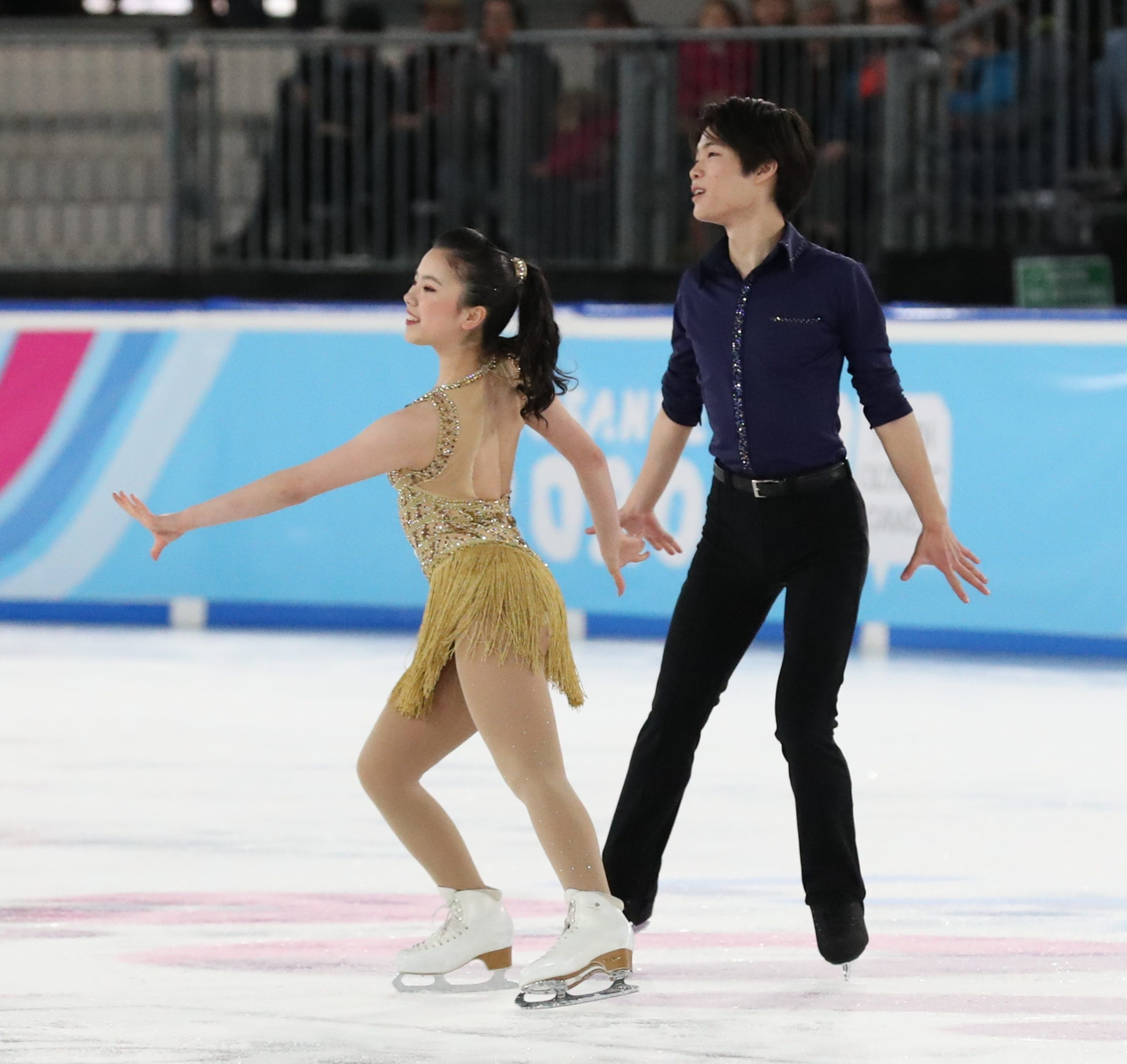
Yoshida / Nishiyama at the 2020 Winter Youth Olympics

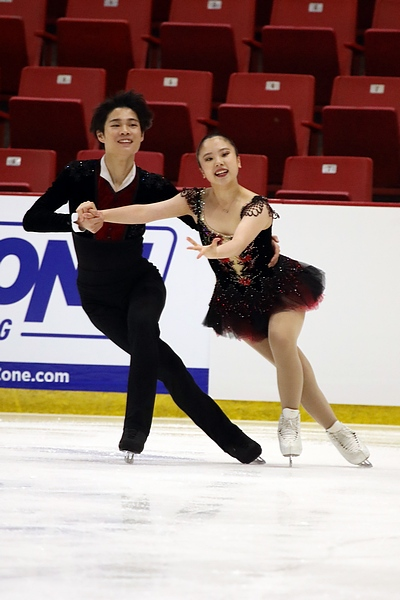
Yoshida/Nishiyama at the 2019 JGP United States

2020–21 season
| Date | Event | RD | FD | Total |
|---|---|---|---|---|
| November 21–23, 2020 | 2020–21 Japan Junior Championships | 1; 58.74 | 1; 91.06 | 1; 149.80 |
| Oct. 30 – Nov. 1, 2020 | 2020–21 Japan Western Sectional | 1; 58.83 | 1; 88.12 | 1; 146.95 |
2019–20 season
| Date | Event | RD | FD | Total |
| March 2–8, 2020 | 2020 World Junior Championships | 13; 56.05 | 8; 93.56 | 12; 149.61 |
| February 3–9, 2020 | 2020 Bavarian Open | 6; 56.36 | 6; 86.32 | 6; 142.68 |
| January 10–15, 2020 | 2020 Winter Youth Olympics – Team | – | 1; 99.31 | 1T/1P |
| January 10–15, 2020 | 2020 Winter Youth Olympics | 6; 56.38 | 4; 92.32 | 6; 148.70 |
| November 15–17, 2019 | 2019–20 Japan Junior Championships | 1; 57.49 | 1; 90.06 | 1; 147.55 |
| November 1–4, 2019 | 2019–20 Japan Western Sectional | 1; 59.06 | 1; 91.30 | 1; 150.36 |
| October 2–5, 2019 | 2019 JGP Italy | 7; 54.92 | 6; 85.48 | 6; 140.40 |
| August 28–31, 2019 | 2019 JGP United States | 6; 56.43 | 5; 83.32 | 6; 139.75 |
