= Utana Yoshida =

Japanese ice dancer (born 2003)

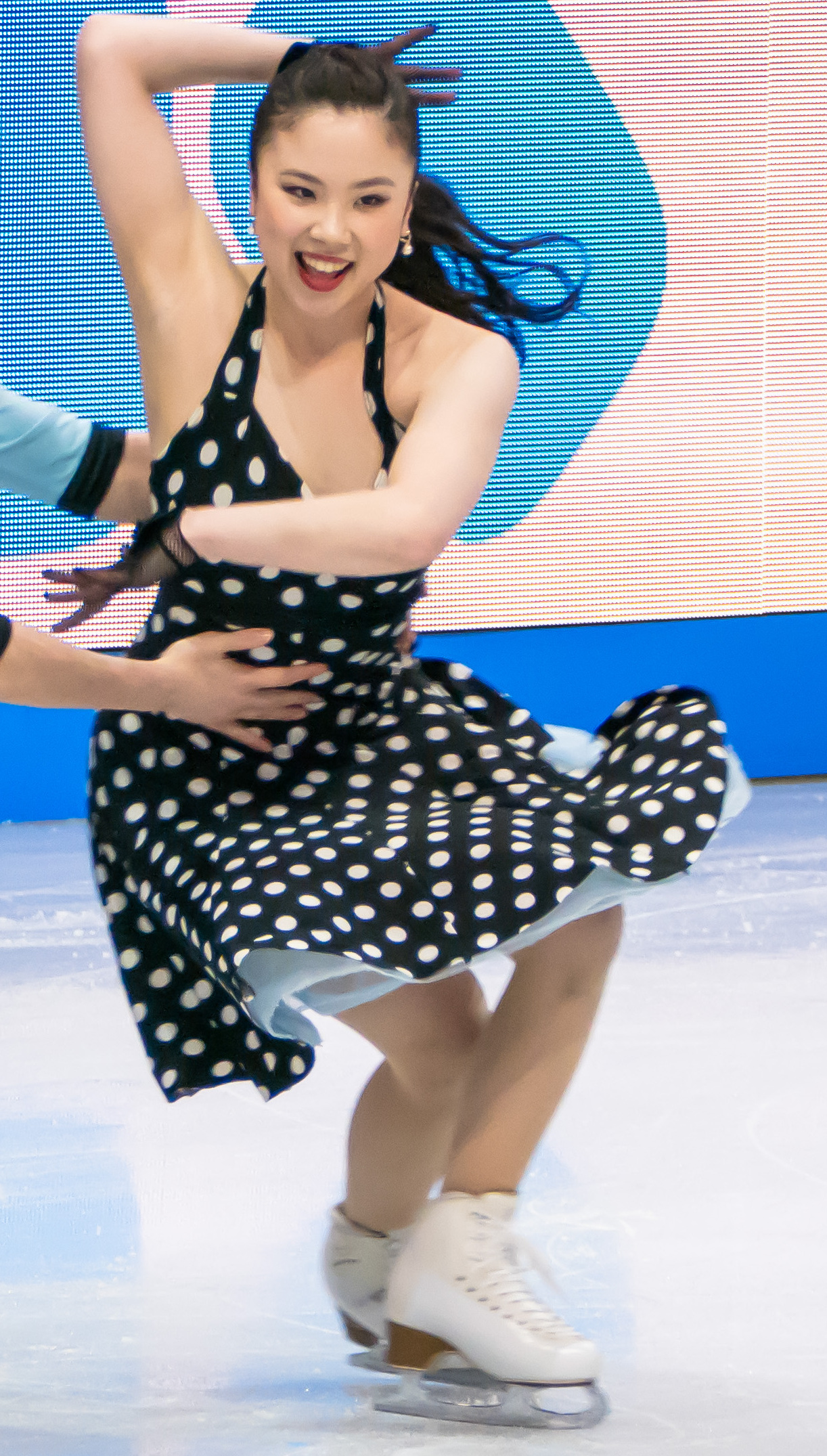
- Yoshida at the 2025 World Championships

Personal information
- Native name: 吉田 唄菜
- Born: September 6, 2003 (age 23) Kurashiki, Japan
- Home town: Kyoto, Japan
- Height: 1.54 m (5 ft 1 in)

Figure skating career
- Country: Japan
- Partner: Masaya Morita (since 2023); Seiji Urano (2021); Shingo Nishiyama (2019–21); Takumi Sugiyama (2016–17)
- Coach: Cathy Reed; Scott Moir; Madison Hubbell; Adrián Díaz
- Skating club: Kinoshita Academy
- Began skating: 2010
Olympic Games
Silver medal – second place	2026 Milano Cortina	Team
Japan Championships
Gold medal – first place	2024–25 Osaka	Ice dance
Gold medal – first place	2025–26 Tokyo	Ice dance
Bronze medal – third place	2023–24 Nagano	Ice dance
World Team Trophy
Silver medal – second place	2025 Tokyo	Team
Winter Youth Olympics
Gold medal – first place	2020 Lausanne	Team

Utana Yoshida (吉田 唄菜, Yoshida Utana; born September 6, 2003) is a Japanese ice dancer, who currently competes with Masaya Morita. Together, they are 2026 Olympic team event silver medalists, the 2025 Asian Winter Games champions, and two-time Japanese national champions (2024–25, 2025–26).

With her former skating partner, Shingo Nishiyama, she was a two-time Japanese national junior ice dance champion (2019–20, 2020–21) and a 2020 Winter Youth Olympics champion in the team event.

== Personal life ==
Yoshida was born on September 6, 2003, in Kurashiki, Japan. She is a graduate of N High School.

She looks up to ice dance teams Carreira/Ponomarenko and Lajoie/Lagha.

== Career ==
=== Early career ===
Yoshida began skating in 2010 after being inspired from watching Mao Asada perform at the 2010 Winter Olympics. Originally a ladies' singles skater, she placed seventh at the novice level at the Chu-Shikoku-Kyushu Regional in 2014, and thus failed to advance to the 2014–15 Japan Championships. Yoshida switched to ice dance in 2016, partnering with Takumi Sugiyama. Yoshida / Sugiyama were fourth at the 2016–17 Japan Junior Championships and won the advanced novice gold medal at the 2017 Mentor Toruń Cup. Yoshida / Sugiyama split at the end of the season, and she was partnerless for two seasons.

=== Ice dance with Shingo Nishiyama ===
==== 2019–2020 season ====
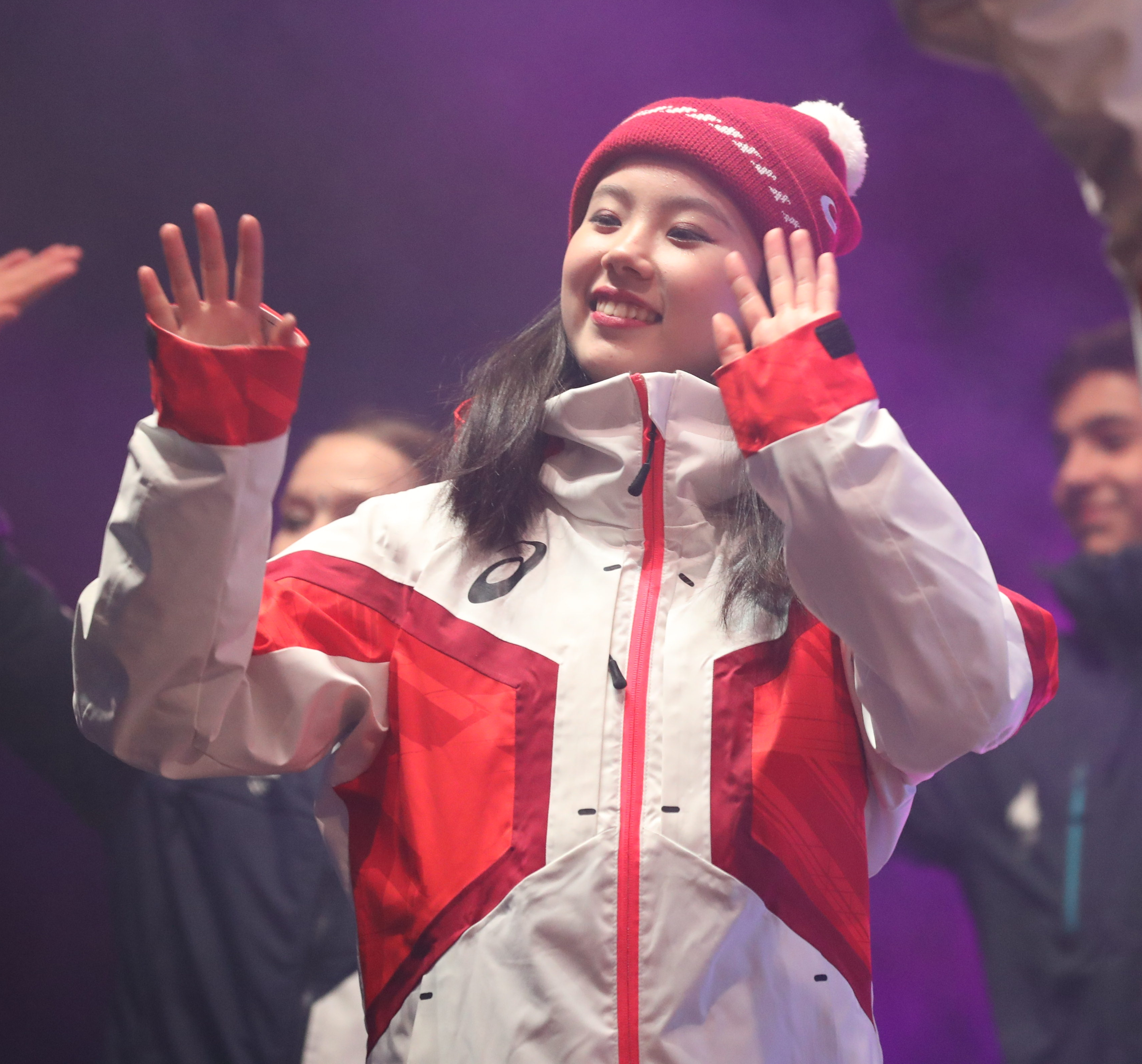
Yoshida at the 2020 Winter Youth Olympics

Yoshida teamed up with Shingo Nishiyama in early 2019 after a tryout arranged by the Japan Skating Federation in fall 2018 and moved to train with him and his coaches at the Toronto Cricket, Skating and Curling Club in Canada in February 2019.

In their first season as a partnership, Yoshida/Nishiyama placed sixth at both 2019 JGP United States and 2019 JGP Italy. They then won gold at the Western Sectional and advanced to the 2019–20 Japan Junior Championships, where they again won gold, ahead of Ayumi Takanami / Yoshimitsu Ikeda. As a result, Yoshida/Nishiyama were assigned to the 2020 World Junior Championships and the 2020 Winter Youth Olympics. They were invited to skate in the gala at the 2019 NHK Trophy as junior national champion.

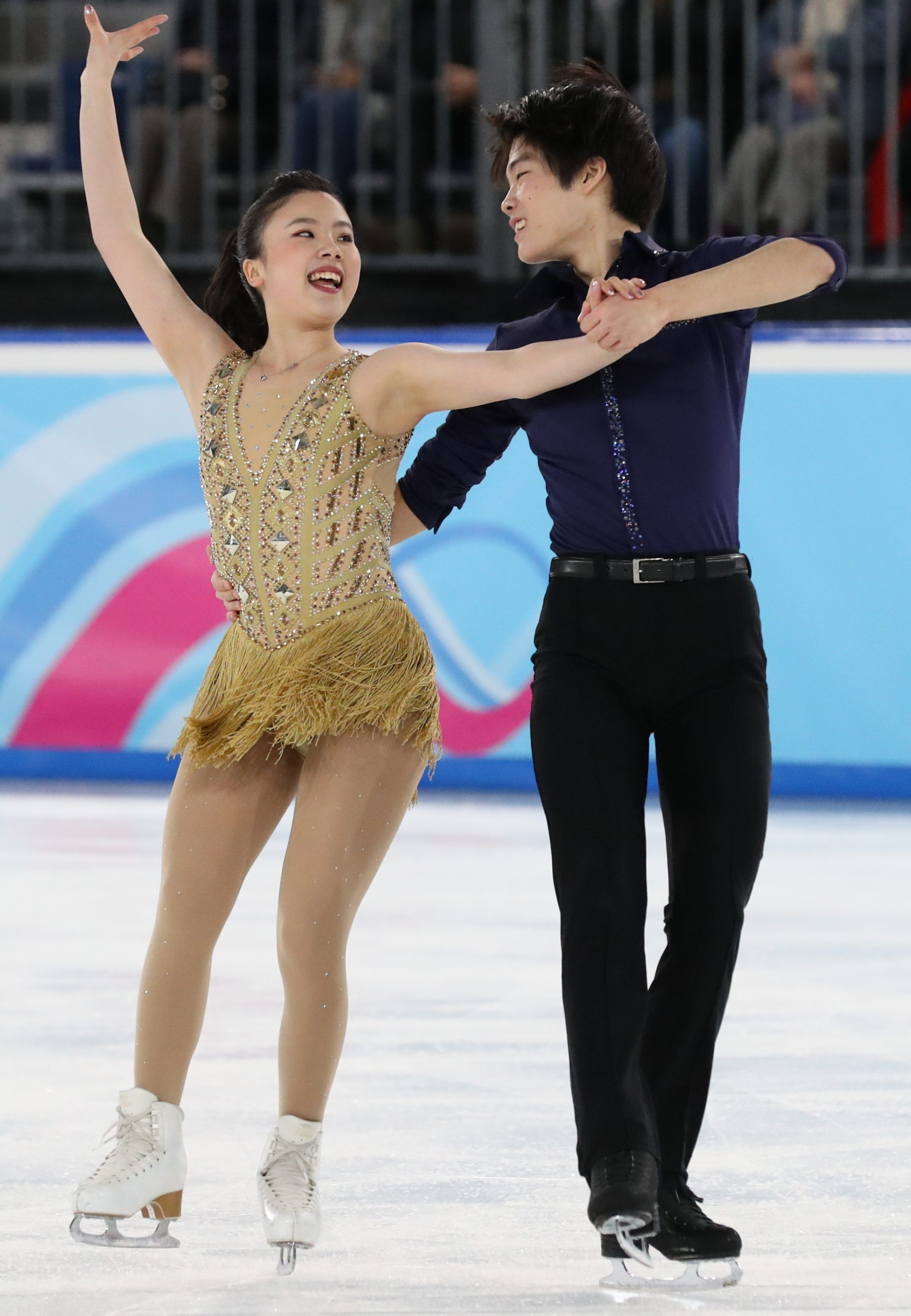
Yoshida/Nishiyama at the 2020 Winter Youth Olympics

At the 2020 Winter Youth Olympics, Yoshida / Nishiyama placed sixth in the ice dance event with a new personal best, following a sixth-place rhythm dance and a fourth-place free dance. They were chosen by draw to be part of Team Courage for the mixed-NOC team event, alongside singles' skaters Arlet Levandi of Estonia and Ksenia Sinitsyna of Russia and pairs team Alina Butaeva / Luka Berulava of Georgia. Yoshida/Nishiyama won the free dance portion of the team event, ahead of both the silver and bronze medalists from the individual ice dance event, to help Team Courage win the gold medal.

Yoshida/Nishiyama set a goal of being in the top ten at the 2020 World Junior Championships. They placed twelfth in Tallinn.

==== 2020–2021 season ====
Due to the COVID-19 pandemic, the Junior Grand Prix, where Yoshida/Nishiyama would have competed, was cancelled. In November, they won their second consecutive junior national title at the 2020–21 Japan Junior Championships.

Yoshida/Nishiyama announced their split in January 2021.

=== Partnership with Seiji Urano ===
==== 2021–2022 season ====
In May 2021, Yoshida announced her partnership with American skater Seiji Urano for Japan.

Yoshida/Urano did not appear in any major international or domestic events before announcing their split in December 2021.

=== Ice dance with Masaya Morita ===
==== 2023–2024 season: Debut of Yoshida/Morita ====
In April 2023, then partnerless Japanese ice dancer, Masaya Morita sent a DM to Yoshida's Instagram account, asking if she would be interested in having a tryout with him which she agreed to. The two would meet up at the Okayama International Skating Rink in Okayama, where their tryout was monitored by Morita's coach, Cathy Reed and Yoshida's coach, Rie Arikawa. This tryout would prove successful and end with Yoshida/Morita agreeing to pair up on that same day. Yoshida would move to Uji, Kyoto to train with Morita at the Kinoshita Skate Academy under coaches, Reed and Arikawa.

Yoshida/Morita made their international competitive debut on the Challenger circuit at the 2023 CS Golden Spin of Zagreb, where they finished in fifth place. They next competed at the 2023–24 Japan Championships, which proved to be a tight contest between them and two other senior teams. They finished third in the rhythm dance after Morita fell in their twizzle sequence, coming behind Yoshida's former partner Nishiyama and his new partner Azusa Tanaka and the four-time national champions Komatsubara/Koleto. Yoshida/Morita then won the free dance, but remained in third place overall for the bronze medal. Yoshida said that they were "happy to have skated at Nationals," but admitted they had come just short of their goal of hitting 110 points in the free dance.

With the close result at the national championships, the Japan Skating Federation opted to postpone assigning Japan's lone berth at the 2024 World Championships pending the results of all three teams at the 2024 Four Continents Championships. Traveling to Shanghai to compete, Yoshida/Morita finished tenth overall, but more than sixteen points behind national champions Komatsubara/Koleto.

==== 2024–25 season: First national title ====
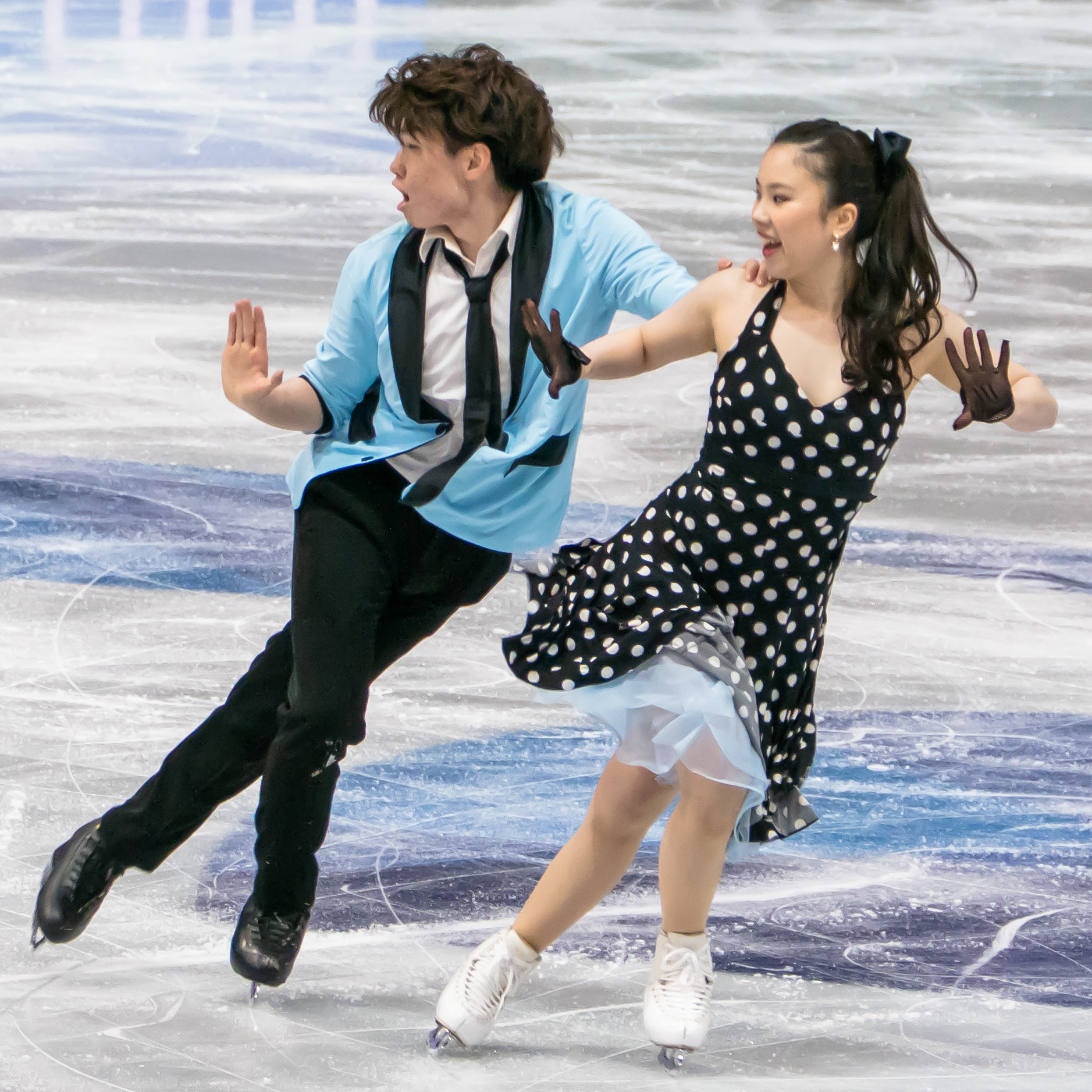
Yoshida/Morita performing their rhythm dance at the 2025 World Championships

Yoshida/Morita started the season by competing at the 2024 CS Nebelhorn Trophy, where they finished in fifth place. Going on to make their Grand Prix series debut, the duo finished ninth at the 2024 NHK Trophy.

In late December, Yoshida/Morita won the national title at the 2024–25 Japan Championships. They were subsequently named to the Four Continents and World teams.

Going on to compete at the 2025 Asian Winter Games in Harbin, China, Yoshida/Morita won the gold medal. They subsequently competed at the 2025 Four Continents Championships in Seoul, South Korea, finishing in eighth place.

At the 2025 World Championships in Boston, Massachusetts, United States, Yoshida/Morita placed twenty-second in the rhythm dance, only 0.40 points from qualifying for the free dance segment.

Selected to compete for Team Japan at the 2025 World Team Trophy, Yoshida/Morita placed sixth in all segments of the ice dance event and Team Japan won the silver medal overall. Following the event, the team added Scott Moir, Madison Hubbell, and Adrián Díaz to their coaching team.

==== 2025–26 season: Olympic team event silver and second national title ====
Yoshida/Morita opened their season by finishing sixth at the 2025 CS Kinoshita Group Cup. They then went on to compete at the final Olympic qualifying event, the 2025 Skate to Milano. Yoshida/Morita finished seventh overall and were named as the third alternates for the 2026 Winter Olympic ice dance team.

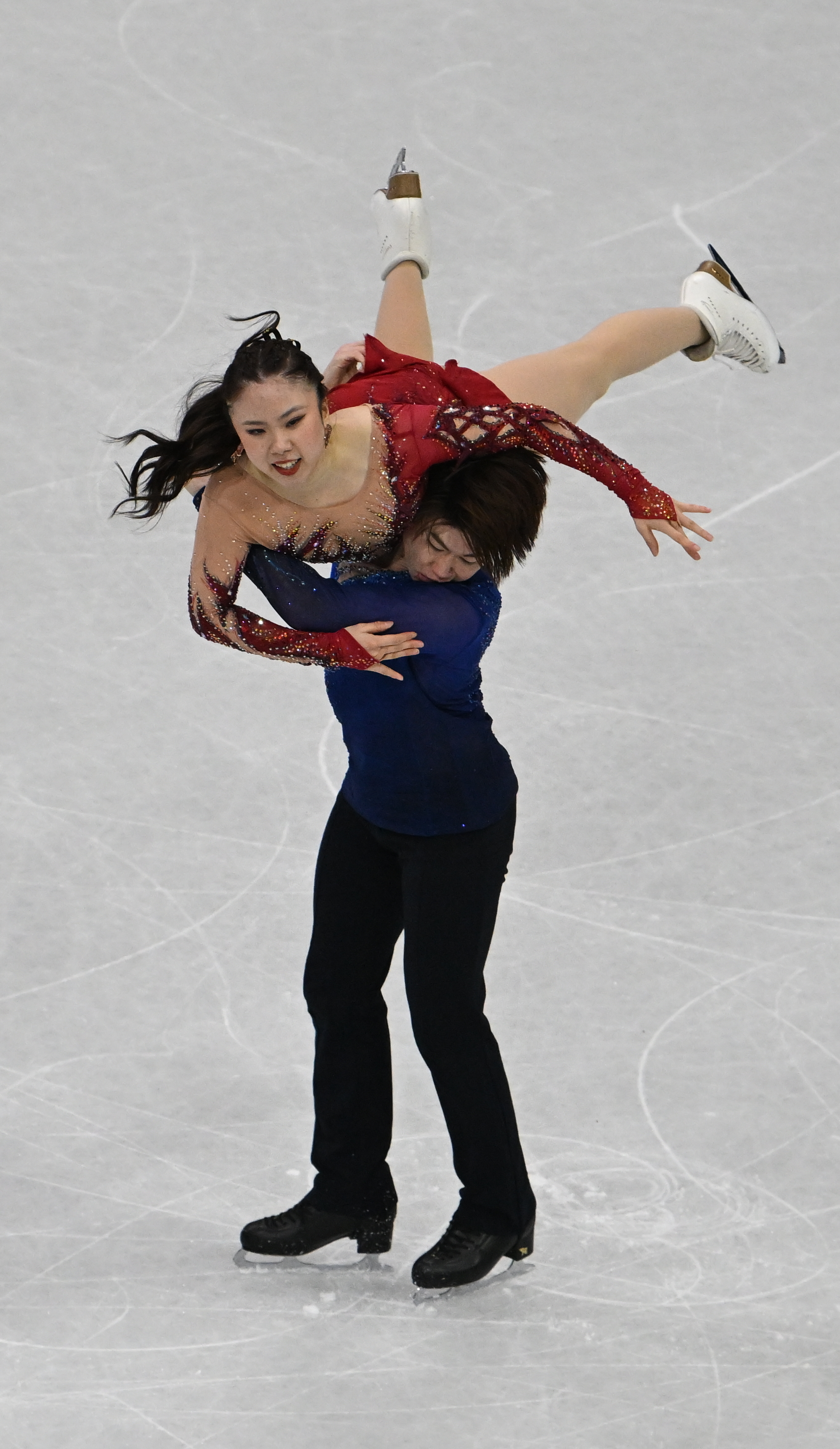
Yoshida/Morita performing a lift during their free dance at the 2026 Winter Olympics Figure Skating Team Event

They subsequently competed at the 2025 CS Trialeti Trophy, placing fifth overall. Selected as host picks at the 2025 NHK Trophy, Yoshida/Morita finished the event in tenth place overall.

In late December, Yoshida/Morita competed at the Japan Championships, winning their second consecutive national title. It was subsequently announced that Yoshida/Morita were selected to compete for Team Japan in the team event at the 2026 Winter Olympics. The following month, they finished seventh at the 2026 Four Continents Championships in Beijing, China. On 6 February, Yoshida/Morita competed in the 2026 Winter Olympics Figure Skating Team Event where they finished eighth in the rhythm dance. "Today was so fun!" said Yoshida. "We really love the vibe of this event. It’s so fun to skate for a team, not just for ourselves, and we’re really here to do our best for Team Japan." The following day, they placed fifth in the free dance. "Since yesterday, including today, everyone really delivered amazing performances," noted Yoshida. "We also got in the rink today hoping to follow that flow as well. We think we were able to do that, even if just a little." With their combined placements, Team Japan won the silver medal overall.

Following the result, pianist, Jennifer Thomas, who composed Yoshida/Morita's free dance music praised the team on her Instagram account, saying, "You guys skated the most beautiful program, and a huge congratulations on helping your team win silver!"

The following month, Yoshida/Morita competed at the 2026 World Championships in Prague, Czech Republic. They earned a personal best in the rhythm dance segment and placed fifteenth thus qualifying for the free dance. Yoshida/Morita went on to place eighteenth in the free dance to finish in nineteenth place overall. "This season had been really long, but we were able to have many wonderful experiences," said Morita following their free dance performance. "I think those results led to our rhythm dance scores and being able to skate the free until the end. We'll use these experiences and do our best to improve even more next season."

==== 2026–27 season ====
Yoshida/Morita opened their season finishing 6th at the 2026 Kinoshita Cup.

== Programs ==
=== Ice dance with Masaya Morita ===
Season	Rhythm dance	Free dance	Exhibition
2026–2027	Danse Macabre by Camille Saint-Saëns performed by Sephira; Carnival Chant Batería by Yaiza Varona choreo. by Cathy Reed	Heart by Healing Sound Project, Sarah Jane Hargis; The Pulse of Life by Victoria Foust	
2025–2026	Stomp to My Beat by JS16; Butterfly by Smile.dk; Stomp to My Beat by JS16 choreo. by Scott Moir, Madison Hubbell, & Adrián Díaz	Rise of the Phoenix by Jennifer Thomas; X-X by Hans Zimmer; Rise of the Phoenix by Quantum Infinity, Daniel O'Borne, & Matthew Cooper choreo. by Massimo Scali; Violin Fantasy on Puccini’s Turandot by Giacomo Puccini performed by Vanessa-Mae choreo. by Scott Moir, Madison Hubbell, & Adrián Díaz	I Wanna Dance by Artem Uzunov
2024–2025	Be-Bop-a-Lula by Gene Vincent and His Blue Caps & Tex Davis; Be-Bop-a-Lula (Original Artist Re-Recording) by Gene Vincent & Tex Davis; Whole Lotta Shakin' Goin' On by Dave Williams & Roy Hall performed by Elvis Presley choreo. by Cathy Reed	Romeo and Juliet, Op. 64; The Deaths of the Lovers; Introduction; Juliet’s Room; Dance of the Knights; Balcony Scene; Tybalt Interrupts; Dance of the Knights by Sergei Prokofiev choreo. by Scott Moir, Madison Hubbell, & Adrián Díaz	Apt. by Rosé & Bruno Mars; Feel It Still by Portugal. The Man
2023–2024	Real Wild Child (Wild One) by Iggy Pop & Johnny O'Keefe; Wild Thing by X & Chip Taylor; Wild Side by Mötley Crüe, Tommy Lee, & Nikki Sixx choreo. by Cathy Reed, Kaitlyn Weaver	Rise of the Phoenix by Jennifer Thomas; X-X by Hans Zimmer; Rise of the Phoenix by Quantum Infinity, Daniel O'Borne, & Matthew Cooper choreo. by Massimo Scali	

=== Ice dance with Shingo Nishiyama ===
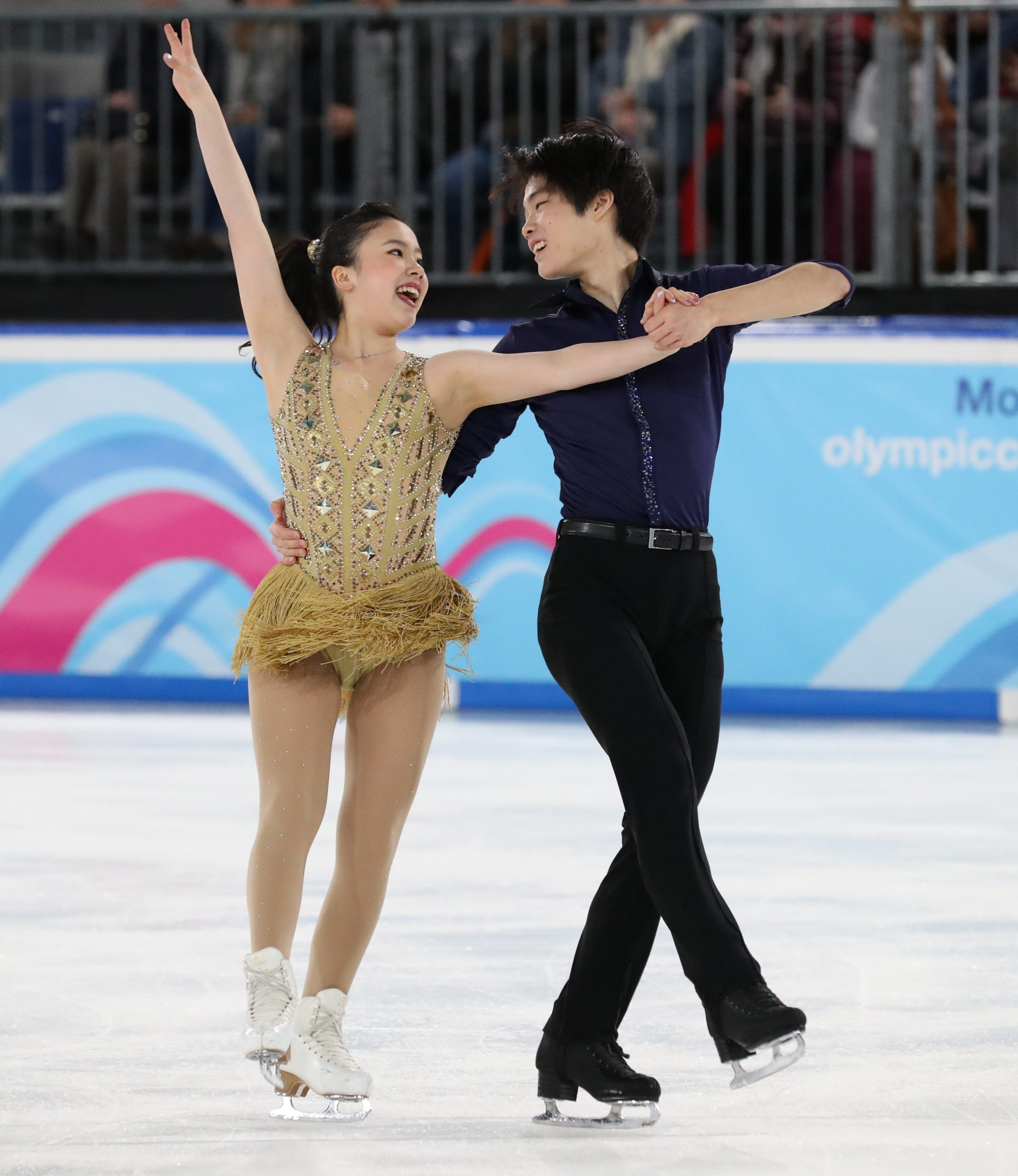
Yoshida/Nishiyama at the 2020 Winter Youth Olympics

Season	Rhythm dance	Free dance	Exhibition
2020–2021	Charleston: One; Foxtrot: I Can Do That; Foxtrot: Medley (from A Chorus Line) by Marvin Hamlisch choreo. by Aaron Lowe & Megan Wing	Entree of Basil; Pas de Deux (from Don Quixote) by Léon Minkus choreo. by Romain Haguenauer	Hip Hip Chin Chin; Charleston: One; Foxtrot: I Can Do That; Foxtrot: Medley (from A Chorus Line) by Marvin Hamlisch choreo. by Aaron Lowe & Megan Wing
2019–2020	Charleston: One; Foxtrot: I Can Do That; Foxtrot: Medley (from A Chorus Line) by Marvin Hamlisch choreo. by Aaron Lowe & Megan Wing	Entree of Basil; Pas de Deux (from Don Quixote) by Léon Minkus choreo. by Romain Haguenauer	

== Competitive highlights ==
- GP – Event of the ISU Grand Prix Series
- JGP – Event of the ISU Junior Grand Prix Series
- CS – Event of the ISU Challenger Series
- TBD – Assigned
- WD – Withdrew from competition

=== Ice dance with Masaya Morita ===
Competition placements at senior level
Season	2023–24	2024–25	2025–26	2026–27
Winter Olympics (Team event)			2nd	
World Championships		22nd	19th	
Four Continents Championships	10th	8th	7th	
Japan Championships	3rd	1st	1st	
World Team Trophy		2nd (6th)		
GP NHK Trophy		9th	10th	TBD
CS Golden Spin of Zagreb	5th			
CS Kinoshita Group Cup			6th	6th
CS Trialeti Trophy			5th	
Asian Winter Games		1st		
Skate to Milano			7th	

=== Ice dance with Shingo Nishiyama ===
International: Junior
Event	19–20	20–21
Junior Worlds	12th	
Youth Olympics	6th	
JGP Italy	6th	
JGP United States	6th	
Bavarian Open	6th	
National
Japan Junior Champ.	1st	1st
Japan Western Sect.	1st J	1st J
Team events
Youth Olympics	1st T 1st P	
T = Team result; P = Personal result. Medals awarded for team result only. Levels: J= Junior

=== Ice dance with Takumi Sugiyama ===
International: Advanced novice
Event	16–17
Mentor Toruń Cup	1st
National
Japan Junior Champ.	4th
Japan Novice Champ.	1st

== Detailed results ==
=== Ice dance with Masaya Morita ===
ISU personal best scores in the +5/-5 GOE System
Segment	Type	Score	Event
Total	TSS	173.49	2026 World Championships
Rhythm dance	TSS	72.33	2026 World Championships
Rhythm dance	TES	42.40	2026 World Championships
Rhythm dance	PCS	30.07	2025 NHK Trophy
Free dance	TSS	103.35	2026 Four Continents Championships
Free dance	TES	59.91	2026 Four Continents Championships
Free dance	PCS	45.10	2024 CS Nebelhorn Trophy

Results in the 2023–24 season
Date	Event	RD		FD		Total	
Date	Event	P	Score	P	Score	P	Score
Dec 6–9, 2023	(Croatia) 2023 CS Golden Spin	7	62.88	5	101.32	5	164.20
Dec 20–24, 2023	2023–24 Japan Championships	3	64.00	1	109.17	3	173.17
Jan 30–Feb 4, 2024	(China) 2024 Four Continents Championships	10	62.86	10	103.27	10	166.13

Results in the 2024–25 season
Date	Event	RD		FD		Total	
Date	Event	P	Score	P	Score	P	Score
Sep 19–21, 2024	(Germany) 2024 CS Nebelhorn Trophy	6	68.94	5	102.65	6	171.59
Nov 8–10, 2024	(Japan) 2024 NHK Trophy	9	64.30	9	97.06	9	161.36
Dec 19–22, 2024	2024–25 Japan Championships	1	71.84	1	104.37	1	176.21
Feb 11–13, 2025	(China) 2025 Asian Winter Games	1	68.88	2	104.43	1	173.31
Feb 19–23, 2025	(South Korea) 2025 Four Continents Championships	8	65.00	9	101.56	8	166.56
Mar 25–30, 2025	(United States) 2025 World Championships	22	67.69	—N/a	—N/a	22	67.69
Apr 17–20, 2025	(Japan) 2025 World Team Trophy	6	56.63	6	94.95	2 (6)	151.58

Results in the 2025–26 season
Date	Event	RD		FD		Total	
Date	Event	P	Score	P	Score	P	Score
Sep 5–7, 2025	(Japan) 2025 CS Kinoshita Group Cup	6	62.81	6	98.25	6	161.06
Sep 18–21, 2025	(China) 2025 ISU Skate to Milano	4	69.14	7	98.49	7	167.63
Oct 8–11, 2025	(Georgia (country)) 2025 CS Trialeti Trophy	5	69.69	7	98.27	5	167.96
Nov 7–9, 2025	(Japan) 2025 NHK Trophy	8	69.61	10	85.67	10	155.28
Dec 18–21, 2025	2025–26 Japan Championships	1	68.78	1	103.51	1	172.29
Jan 21–25, 2026	(China) 2026 Four Continents Championships	6	67.31	7	103.35	7	170.66
Feb 6–8, 2026	(Italy) 2026 Winter Olympics – Team event	8	68.64	5	98.55	2	—N/a
Mar 24–29, 2026	(Czech Republic) 2026 World Championships	15	72.33	18	101.16	19	173.49

Results in the 2026–27 season
Date	Event	RD		FD		Total	
Date	Event	P	Score	P	Score	P	Score
Sep 4–6, 2026	(Japan) 2026 Kinoshita Group Cup	4	71.50	6	98.99	6	170.49
Nov 27–29, 2026	(Japan) 2026 NHK Trophy						TBD

=== Ice dance with Shingo Nishiyama ===
==== Junior results ====
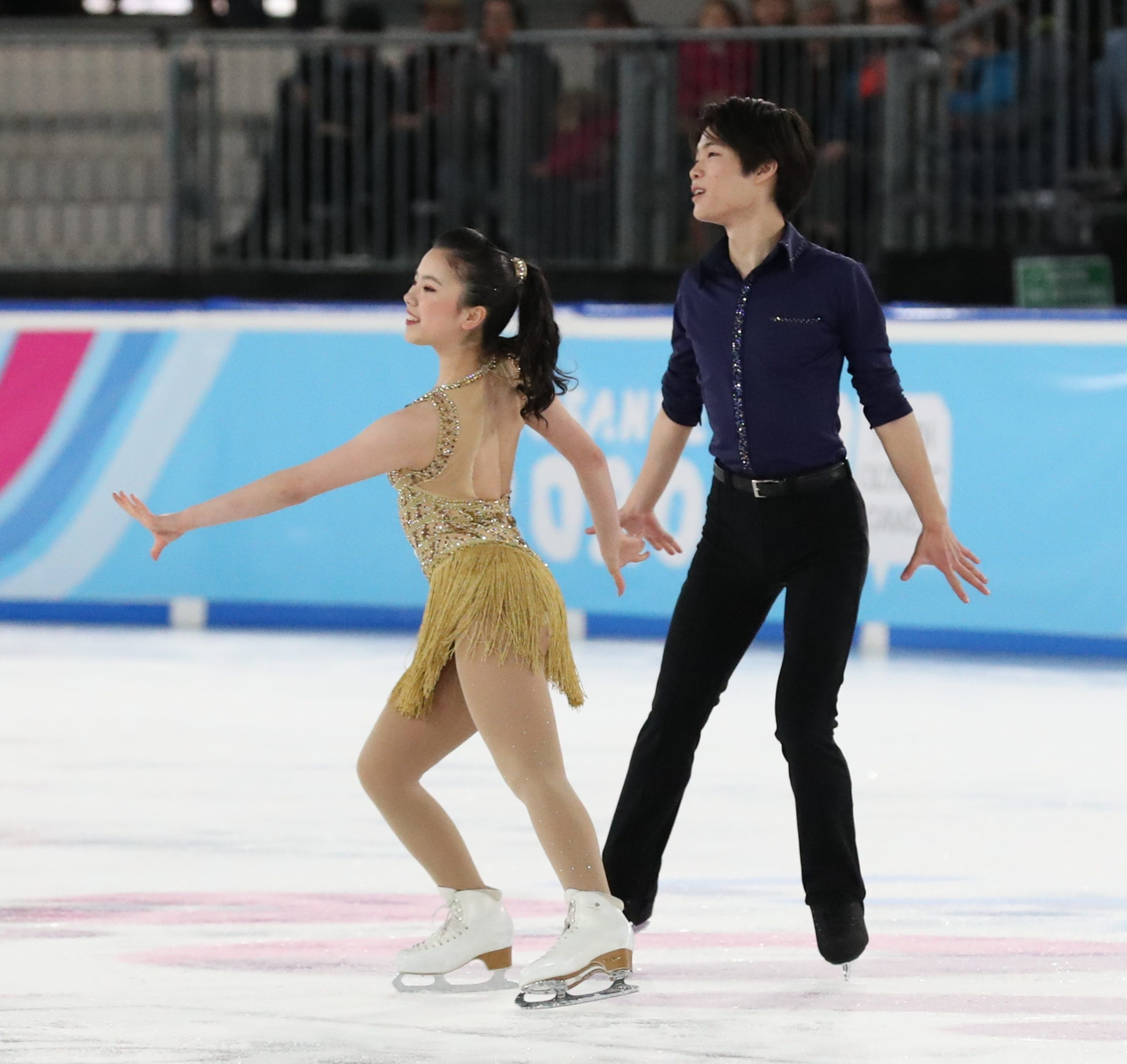
Yoshida / Nishiyama at the 2020 Winter Youth Olympics

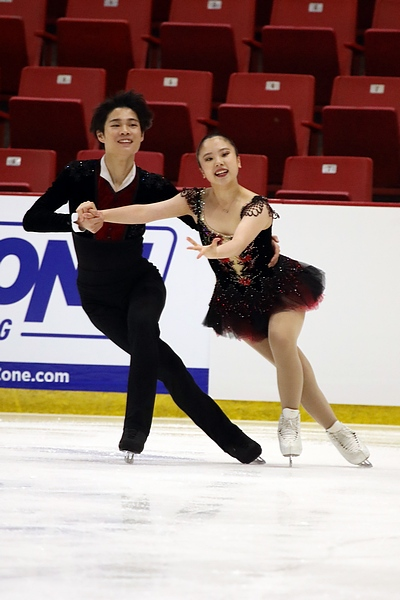
Yoshida/Nishiyama at the 2019 JGP United States

2020–21 season
Date	Event	RD	FD	Total
November 21–23, 2020	2020–21 Japan Junior Championships	1; 58.74	1; 91.06	1; 149.80
Oct. 30 – Nov. 1, 2020	2020–21 Japan Western Sectional	1; 58.83	1; 88.12	1; 146.95
2019–20 season
Date	Event	RD	FD	Total
March 2–8, 2020	2020 World Junior Championships	13; 56.05	8; 93.55	12; 149.61
February 3–9, 2020	2020 Bavarian Open	6; 56.36	6; 86.32	6; 142.68
January 10–15, 2020	2020 Winter Youth Olympics – Team	–	1; 99.31	1T/1P
January 10–15, 2020	2020 Winter Youth Olympics	6; 56.38	4; 92.32	6; 148.70
November 15–17, 2019	2019–20 Japan Junior Championships	1; 57.49	1; 90.06	1; 147.55
November 1–4, 2019	2019–20 Japan Western Sectional	1; 59.06	1; 91.30	1; 150.36
October 2–5, 2019	2019 JGP Italy	7; 54.92	6; 85.48	6; 140.40
August 28–31, 2019	2019 JGP United States	6; 56.43	5; 83.32	6; 139.75

=== With Sugiyama ===
2016–17 season
Date	Event	Level	PD1	PD2	SD	FD	Total
January 10–15, 2017	2017 Mentor Toruń Cup	Adv. novice	2; 13.15	2; 13.37	–	1; 53.09	1; 79.61
November 18–20, 2016	2016–17 Japan Junior Championships	Junior	–	–	6; 29.88	2; 56.82	4; 86.70
