= Joey Russell =

Canadian figure skater

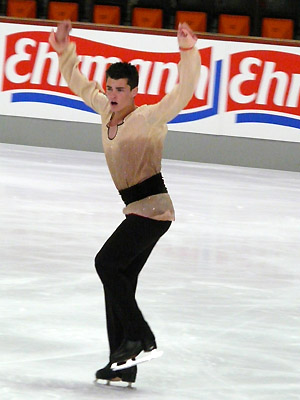
- Russell in 2007.

Personal information
- Born: June 24, 1988 (age 38) Labrador City, Newfoundland and Labrador, Canada
- Height: 1.79 m (5 ft 10 in)

Figure skating career
- Country: Canada
- Skating club: Polaris Labrador City
- Began skating: 1994
- Retired: May 31, 2011

Joey Russell (born June 24, 1988 in Labrador City) is a Canadian former competitive figure skater. He competed at four ISU Championships; his best result was 11th, achieved at the 2007 World Junior Championships in Oberstdorf and at the 2010 Four Continents Championships in Jeonju. On the national level, he won the Canadian junior title in 2006 and a senior bronze medal in 2011. Russell trained at the Mariposa School of Skating.

== Post-competitive career ==
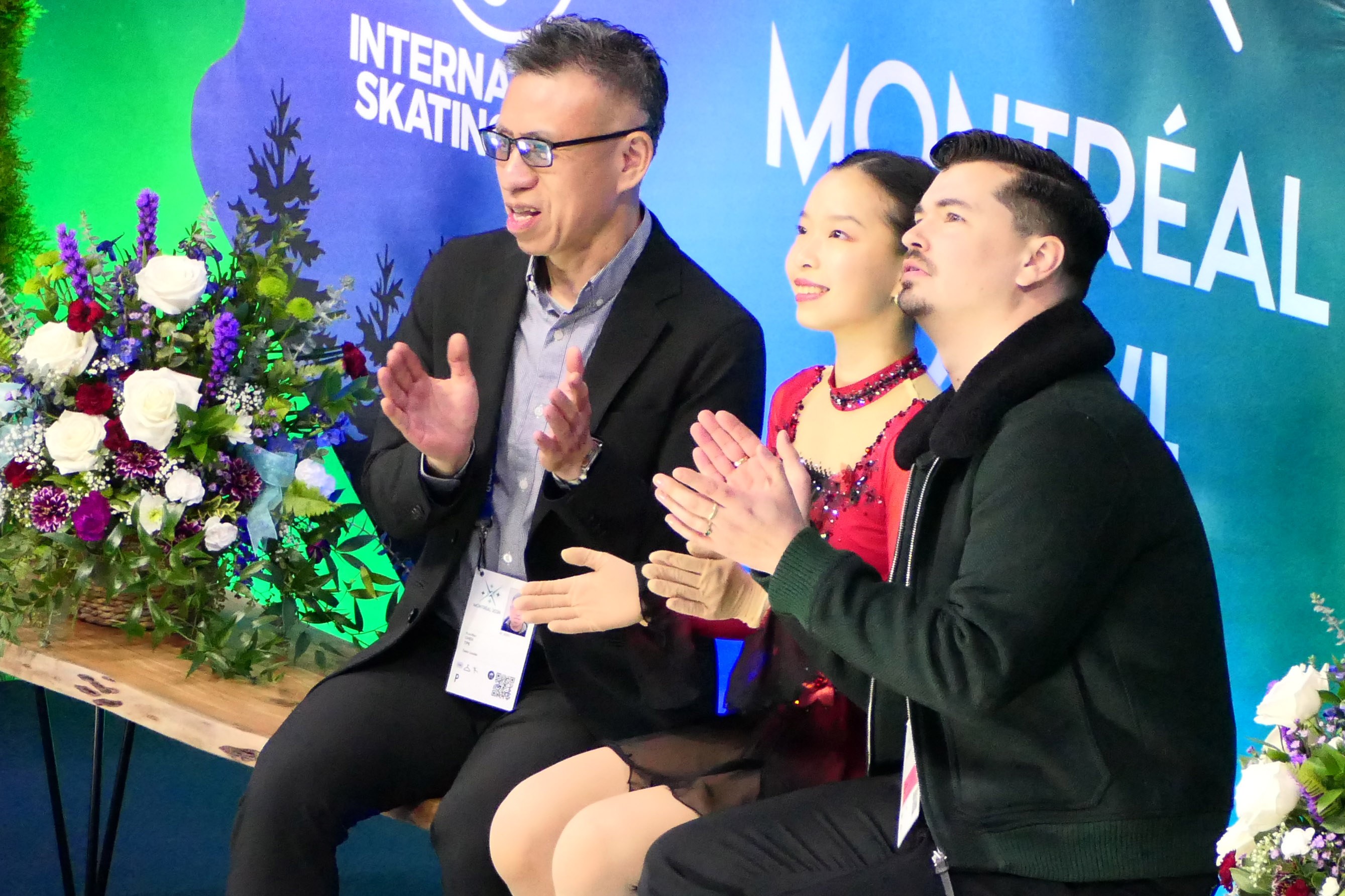
Russell (right) with student, Ting Tzu-Han, at the 2024 World Championships.

Following his retirement from competitive figure skating in 2011, Russell became a coach and choreographer based at the Toronto Cricket Skating and Curling Club.

As a coach, Russell's current and former students include:

- (Mexico) Natalia Acosta Moisés
- (Canada) Victoria Barakhtina
- (Canada) Natalie D'Alessandro / Bruce Waddell
- (Japan) Shingo Nishiyama
- (Spain) Javier Raya
- (Canada) Alison Schumacher
- (Azerbaijan) Nargiz Süleymanova
- (Chinese Taipei) Ting Tzu-Han
- (Canada) Amanda Tobin
- (Japan) Utana Yoshida / Shingo Nishiyama
- (Canada) Terry Yu Tao Jin

As a choreographer, Russell has worked with:

- (Mexico) Natalia Acosta Moisés
- (Canada) Martina Ariano Kent / Charly Laliberté Laurent
- (South Korea) Cha Jun-hwan
- (Canada) Wesley Chiu
- (Canada) (Italy) Corey Circelli
- (South Africa) Michaela Du Toit
- (Sweden) Joshi Helgesson
- (China) Jin Boyang
- (South Korea) Kim Seo-young
- (South Korea) Lee Hae-in
- (Canada) David Li
- (Canada) Grayson Long
- (Thailand) Pimmpida Lerdpraiwan
- (United States) Liam Kapeikis
- (Russia) Evgenia Medvedeva
- (Canada) Justine Miclette
- (Canada) Rio Morita
- (Japan) Rio Nakata
- (Canada) Conrad Orzel
- (Spain) Javier Raya
- (Canada) Kaiya Ruiter
- (Kazakhstan) Sofia Samodelkina
- (Canada) Alison Schumacher
- (Canada) Rose Théroux
- (Chinese Taipei) Ting Tzu-Han
- (Canada) Amanda Tobin
- (Canada) Terry Yu Tao Jin

== Competitive highlights ==
GP: Grand Prix; JGP: Junior Grand Prix

International
Event	2004–05	2005–06	2006–07	2007–08	2008–09	2009–10	2010–11
Worlds							24th
Four Continents						11th	14th
GP Skate Canada						10th	
Nebelhorn Trophy				11th	15th	9th	6th
International: Junior
Junior Worlds			11th				
JGP Canada		5th					
JGP Hungary			4th				
JGP Japan		11th					
JGP Norway			11th				
Mladost Trophy	1st J.						
National
Canadians	4th J.	1st J.	6th	9th	6th	5th	3rd
Eastern Challenge	3rd J.	3rd J.					
J. = Junior level
