= I Can Do That =

I Can Do That may refer to:

- "I Can Do That" (Montell Jordan song) (1988)
- "I Can Do That" (A Chorus Line song) (1975)
- "I Can Do That" (American TV series) (2015)
- "I Can Do That" (Indian TV series), a 2015 reality television series
- "I Can Do That" (Philippine TV series), a 2017 reality television series
- "I Can Do That!", an episode of Barney and Friends
