= Brave (Idina Menzel song) =

Single by Idina Menzel

from the album I Stand
- Released: November 6, 2007
- Recorded: 2007
- Genre: Pop
- Length: 4:39 (Album Version); 3:59 (Edit)
- Label: Warner Bros.
- Songwriters: Idina Menzel, Glen Ballard
- Producer: Glen Ballard

Idina Menzel singles chronology
| "Defying Gravity" (2007) | "Brave" (2007) | "Gorgeous" (2007) |

"Brave" is the second single from Idina Menzel's third studio album I Stand. The song was written by Menzel and Glen Ballard and was released on November 6, 2007. It reached the Top 20 on the Adult Contemporary chart peaking at #19 on March 29, 2008.

== Music video ==
A music video was made in which Menzel plays a piano alone in a room. As she leaves, her dress is seen tied to the piano. She proceeds to walk through streets slowly unwrapping the dress she is wearing. The video ends with Menzel standing on top of a building taking the rest of the dress off and revealing a red top and jeans underneath.

== Usage in other media ==
The song was used in the second-season finale of the MTV show The Hills, playing during the climatic "moving out" scene between former best friends Lauren Conrad and Heidi Montag. It was also used in the series 7 finale of Two Pints of Lager and a Packet of Crisps.

== Live performances ==
"Brave" was performed during the I Stand tour which ran from April 1, 2008, until March 28, 2009.

== Formats and track listings ==
U.S. Promo CD single

1. "Brave" (Edit) – 3:59
2. "Brave" (Album version) – 4:39
3. "Brave" (Instrumental) – 4:39
4. "Brave" (Acapella) – 4:39
5. "Brave" (Backing Vocals) – 4:39
6. "Brave" (Lead Vocals) – 4:39
7. "Brave" (Acoustic version) – 4:38

UK CD single

1. "Brave" (UK Mix) – 4:34
2. "Gorgeous" – 3:48
3. "Brave" (Acoustic version) – 4:38

U.S./UK digital single

1. "Brave" – 4:39

UK digital maxi single

1. "Brave" (UK Mix) – 4:34
2. "Gorgeous" – 3:48
3. "Brave" (Acoustic version) – 4:38
4. "Defying Gravity" (Tracy Young's Flying Monkey Club Mix) – 8:02

== Official versions ==
- "Brave" (Album version) – 4:39
- "Brave" (Acapella) – 4:39
- "Brave" (Instrumental) – 4:39
- "Brave" (Lead Vocals) - 4:39
- "Brave" (Backing Vocals) - 4:39
- "Brave" (Edit) – 3:59
- "Brave" (UK Mix) – 4:34
- "Brave" (Acoustic version) – 4:38

== Credits and personnel ==
- Vocals - Idina Menzel
- Songwriting, bass, bass guitar, keyboard, electric guitar, synthesizer, strings, acoustic guitar, piano: Idina Menzel, Glen Ballard
- Guitar: David Levitt, Joel Shearer
- Drums: Blair Sinta
- Production: Glen Ballard

Credits are adapted from the I Stand album liner notes.

== Chart performance ==
| Chart (2008) | Peak position |
|---|---|
| US Adult Contemporary (Billboard) | 19 |
