= I Stand tour =

2008–09 concert tour by Idina Menzel

I Stand Tour
- Tour by Idina Menzel
- Associated album: I Stand
- Start date: April 1, 2008
- End date: March 28, 2009
- No. of shows: 50 total

Idina Menzel concert chronology
- Here Tour (2004-2005); I Stand Tour (2008–2009); Barefoot at the Symphony Tour (2010–2013)

The I Stand tour was a tour taken by American actress and singer Idina Menzel.

== Concert Synopsis ==
Menzel performs a diverse selection songs from her original pop album I Stand, Pop and Rock covers, as well as hits from her breakout performances on Broadway in Wicked and Rent. Throughout the concert, Menzel interacts with the audience sharing stories from inspiration of some of the songs she has written for the album, her early younger years in Long Island, NY (from quitting Hebrew School, to her parents getting divorced, and her life as a Long Island Wedding Singer before landing the role of Maureen Johnson in the original cast of Rent).

== Performances ==
Menzel had recently released a pop album titled I Stand, and, in order to promote the album, got funds to go on tour. The album peaked at #58 on the Billboard Hot 200. On the tour, Menzel sang many songs from the album, as well as other various songs.

The tour began on April 1, 2008, performing four sold out legs. She appeared at places such as George Street Playhouse, Lincoln Center, and The Music Hall. The performance at the Lincoln Center was filmed for a PBS special on the show Soundstage.

Before being well known for appearing on the second season of The Voice, Chris Mann opened up for Menzel during the 3rd leg of the tour.

The tour continued until March 28, 2009, which afterwards Menzel took a year off from the spotlight to have a baby. Following giving birth to her son Walker Nathaniel Diggs, Menzel got offered a recurring role on the TV smash Glee and returned to the Concert stage on embarking on her Barefoot at the Symphony tour (which major symphony orchestras came in place of Menzel's 6-piece rock band).

== Opening Acts ==
- Chris Mann

== Set List ==
Leg 1 (Spring 2008 shows)
1. "I Stand" from I Stand
2. "Don't Let Me Down" from I Stand
3. "Better to Have Loved" from I Stand
4. "Brave" from I Stand
5. "Devorah/Rise Up"
6. "Where Do I Begin" from I Stand
7. "My Own Worst Enemy" from I Stand
8. "Wedding Days"
9. "No Day But Today" from Rent
10. "I Feel Everything" from I Stand
11. "Perfume and Promises" from I Stand
12. "Gorgeous" from I Stand
13. "Defying Gravity" from Wicked

Notes

- No Day But Today was not performed at the New Brunswick, NJ show on April 1, 2008.
Leg 2 (Summer 2008 shows)
1. "I Stand" from I Stand
2. "Don't Let Me Down" from I Stand
3. "Where Do I Begin" from I Stand
4. "Better to Have Loved" from I Stand
5. "Here" from Here
6. "Brave" from I Stand
7. "Roxanne" by The Police or "Heartbreaker" by Pat Benatar
8. "Devorah/Rise Up"
9. "My Own Worst Enemy" from I Stand
10. "Wedding Days"
11. "No Day But Today" from Rent
12. "I Feel Everything" from I Stand
13. "Gorgeous" from I Stand
14. "For Good" from Wicked
15. "Defying Gravity" from Wicked

Notes

- Defying Gravity was performed halfway through the main set (instead of the encore) at the Santa Barbara, CA show on June 18, 2008.
- Tomorrow was performed a cappella as the impromptu encore at the Santa Barbara, CA show on June 18, 2008.
- Faithfully (a cover of the Journey song) was performed at the Atlantic City, NJ show only on June 26, 2008
Leg 3 (Fall 2008 shows)
1. "Don't Let Me Down"
2. "Here" from Here
3. "Heartbreaker"
4. "Brave" from I Stand
5. "Devorah/Rise Up"
6. "Embraceable You" by George and Ira Gershwin
7. "No Day But Today" from Rent
8. "Where Do I Begin" from I Stand
9. "I Feel Everything" from I Stand
10. "My Own Worst Enemy" from I Stand
11. "Company" from Company
12. "I Stand from I Stand/Get Up, Stand Up" by Bob Marley
13. "Forever" from I Stand
14. "For Good" from Wicked
15. "Gorgeous" from I Stand
16. "No Trace Of Us"
17. "Kiss From a Rose"
18. "Defying Gravity" from Wicked
Leg 4 (Winter 2009 shows)
1. "I Stand" from I Stand
2. "Don't Let Me Down" from I Stand
3. "Here" from Here
4. "Brave" from I Stand
5. "Heaven Help My Heart" from Chess
6. "Devorah/Rise Up"
7. "Embraceable You" by George and Ira Gershwin
8. "The Man That Got Away"
9. "No Day But Today" from Rent
10. "Spiraling"
11. "Butterfly"
12. "One"
13. "Still I Can't Be Still" from Still I Can't Be Still
14. "For Good" from Wicked
15. "Gorgeous" from I Stand
16. "No Trace Of Us" or "Company" from Company
17. "Defying Gravity" from Wicked

== Musicians ==
- Musical Director / Guitar: Emerson Swinford
- Bass: Simon Smith
- Drums: Jimmy Paxson
- Keyboards: Joe Kennedy
- Background Vocals and Acoustic Guitar: Holly Palmer
- Background Vocals: Belle Johnson

Notes

- For the April 14, 2008 show in New York City that was filmed for PBS, the band also included a string quartet expanding the sound.

== Tour dates ==
Date	City	Country	Venue
North America: Leg 1
April 1, 2008	New Brunswick	United States	George Street Playhouse
April 3, 2008	Pittsfield	United States	Barrington Stage
April 4, 2008	Mamaroneck	United States	Emelin Theatre
April 6, 2008	Fairfield	United States	Stage One
April 8, 2008	Fairfield	United States	Stage One
April 10, 2008	Wilmington	United States	The Baby Grand
April 11, 2008	Wilmington	United States	The Baby Grand
April 14, 2008	New York City	United States	Rose Hall
United Kingdom
May 20, 2008	London	England	Ambassador's Theatre
North America: Leg 2
June 18, 2008	Santa Barbara	United States	Lobero Theatre
June 20, 2008	San Diego	United States	Humphrey's By The Bay
June 23, 2008	Washington DC	United States	Sixth & I Synagogue
June 25, 2008	New York City	United States	The Town Hall
June 26, 2008	Atlantic City	United States	The Music Box at the Borgata
July 17, 2008	Nashville	United States	James K. Polk Theatre
July 18, 2008	Atlanta	United States	Chastain Park Amphitheatre
July 20, 2008	Cary	United States	Koka Booth Amphitheatre
July 21, 2008	Charlotte	United States	McGlohon Theatre
July 23, 2008	Richmond	United States	The National
July 25, 2008	Ft. Lauderdale	United States	Parker Playhouse
July 27, 2008	Tampa	United States	Tampa Bay Performing Arts Center
August 1, 2008	St. Louis	United States	The Pageant
August 4, 2008	Milwaukee	United States	Northern Lights Casino
August 6, 2008	Chicago	United States	House of Blues
August 7, 2008	Detroit	United States	Gem Theatre
August 9, 2008	St. Paul	United States	Fitzgerald Theater
August 12, 2008	Denver	United States	Newman Center
August 14, 2008	San Francisco	United States	Palace of Fine Arts
August 15, 2008	Los Angeles	United States	Wiltern Theatre
North America: Leg 3		United States	
October 30, 2008	Cleveland	United States	House of Blues
October 31, 2008	Louisville	United States	Bomhard Theatre
November 2, 2008	Madison	United States	Union Theater
November 3, 2008	Platteville	United States	Center for the Arts
November 5, 2008	East Lansing	United States	Pasant Theater
November 7, 2008	Toronto	Canada	Danforth Music Hall
November 8, 2008	Boston	United States	Berklee Performance Center
November 9, 2008	Union	United States	Wilkins Theatre
November 11, 2008	Bridgeport	United States	Klein Memorial Auditorium
November 12, 2008	Pittsburgh	United States	Byham Theater
November 13, 2008	Albany	United States	The Egg
North America: Leg 4
March 18, 2009	Portsmouth	United States	The Music Hall
March 19, 2009	Syracuse	United States	Goldstein Auditorium
March 21, 2009	Red Bank	United States	Count Basie Theatre
March 22, 2009	Tarrytown	United States	Tarrytown Music Hall
March 24, 2009	Alexandria	United States	Birchmere Music Hall
March 25, 2009	Glenside	United States	Keswick Theatre
March 25, 2009	Wilmington	United States	The Grand Opera Hall
March 25, 2009	Brookville	United States	Tilles Center
