= Azusa Tanaka =

Japanese ice dancer (born 2005)

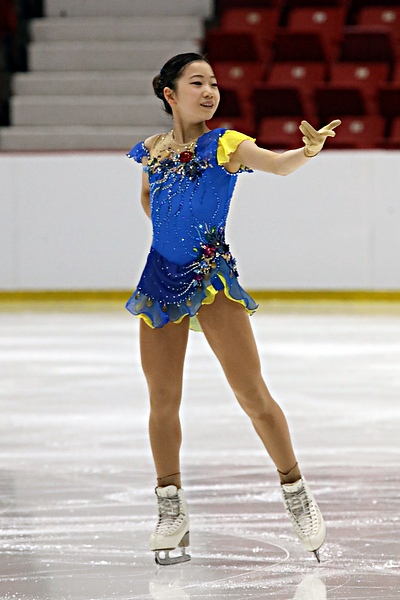
- Tanaka competing in singles at the 2019 JGP United States

Personal information
- Native name: 田中 梓沙
- Born: October 29, 2005 (age 20) Kyoto, Japan
- Home town: Uji, Kyoto
- Height: 1.52 m (5 ft 0 in)

Figure skating career
- Country: Japan
- Partner: Shingo Nishiyama (2023–25)
- Coach: Romain Haguenauer, Marie-France Dubreuil, Patrice Lauzon
- Skating club: OrientalBio
- Began skating: 2012
- Retired: July 11, 2025
Japan Championships
Silver medal – second place	2023–24 Nagano	Ice dance
Silver medal – second place	2024–25 Osaka	Ice dance

Azusa Tanaka (田中 梓沙, Tanaka Azusa; born October 29, 2005) is a retired Japanese ice dancer and former single skater. She and partner Shingo Nishiyama are the 2025 Asian Winter Games bronze medalists and two-time Japanese national silver medalists (2023–24, 2024–25).

== Early life and education ==
Tanaka was born on 29 October 2005 in Kyoto, Japan. She attends Kyoto Koka Girls' High School. Tanaka looks up to fellow Japanese skaters Satoko Miyahara, Kana Muramoto and Yuna Shiraiwa.

== Career ==
=== Early years ===
Tanaka began skating in 2012 after being inspired by her older brother's classmate, who was a figure skater. She placed fourteenth at 2017–18 Japan Novice A Championships and seventh at 2018–19 Japan Novice A Championships.

=== Singles skating career ===
==== 2019–20 season: Junior Grand Prix debut ====
Tanaka was assigned to make her Junior Grand Prix debut at the 2019 JGP Lake Placid on the 2019–20 circuit. In her short program, she missed her combination due to a fall and doubled a planned triple Loop, placing her tenth with a score of 51.37 points. During the free skate, Tanaka downgraded four jumps, falling twice, and doubled a Lutz. Tanaka finished in fourteenth place overall. Appearing next at the 2019–20 Japan Junior Championships, Tanaka finished in tenth place.

==== 2020–21 season ====
The 2020–21 Junior Grand Prix circuit was cancelled due to the COVID-19 pandemic. As a result, Tanaka did not have the opportunity to compete on the Junior Grand Prix again. At the 2020–21 Japan Junior Championships, Tanaka finished in fifteenth place after several mistakes in both programs.

=== 2021–22 season ===
Tanaka competed at the 2021–22 Japan Junior Championships and placed fifth overall, making her highest placement in the event. She then competed at the senior level, finishing tenth in the short program with a clean skate despite a quarter call on her combination. Tanaka struggled in the free skate, coming nineteenth in the segment and dropping to eighteenth place overall.

Tanaka was assigned to compete at the 2023 Egna Trophy in the junior category. She came third in the short program with a score of 51.35. In the free skate, she under-rotated the first three jumps and struggled on the spins, then finishing in fourth place behind Canada's Fiona Bombardier.

=== Ice dance with Nishiyama ===
==== 2023–24 season ====
On 6 May 2023, Japanese ice dancer Shingo Nishiyama announced that he and Tanaka would be forming a new ice dance partnership, and would be training at the Ice Academy of Montreal in Montreal, Canada.

Tanaka/Nishiyama made their international competitive debut on the Challenger circuit at the 2023 CS Golden Spin of Zagreb, coming ninth. They next competed at the 2023–24 Japan Championships, which proved to be a tight contest between them and two other senior teams. Tanaka/Nishiyama won the rhythm dance, finishing ahead of four-time national champions Komatsubara/Koleto and the new team Yoshida/Morita. However, they were third in the free dance, and finished second overall. The team said they were satisfied to have made it onto the podium, noting their rapid progress in the short time since partnering.

With the close result at the national championships, the Japan Skating Federation opted to postpone assigning Japan's lone berth at the 2024 World Championships pending the results of all three teams at the 2024 Four Continents Championships. Traveling to Shanghai to compete, Tanaka/Nishiyama finished eleventh overall, third among the Japanese teams.

==== 2024–25 season ====
Although initially assigned to compete at the 2024 CS Nebelhorn Trophy in September, Tanaka/Nishiyama would withdraw from the event. Their first event of the season was the 2024 NHK Trophy, where they finished tenth.

In late December, Tanaka/Nishiyama won the silver medal at the 2024–25 Japan Championships behind Yoshida/Morita. They were subsequently named to the Four Continents team.

Going on to compete at the 2025 Asian Winter Games in Harbin, China, Tanaka/Nishiyama won the bronze medal. They subsequently finished the season by competing at the 2025 Four Continents Championships in Seoul, South Korea, placing eleventh overall. Throughout the season, Tanaka struggled with a rib injury.

In July 2025, Tanaka announced her retirement from competitive figure skating.

== Programs ==
=== With Nishiyama ===
Season	Rhythm dance	Free dance	Exhibition
2024–2025	September by Earth, Wind & Fire; Sir Duke by Stevie Wonder; Land of a Thousand Dances by Chris Kenner & Fats Domino performed by Wilson Pickett choreo. by Romain Haguenauer	Für Elise by Ludwig van Beethoven; Für Elise Jam by The Piano Guys & Ludwig van Beethoven choreo. by Romain Haguenauer	Super Mario; Mario Bros. by Stryker Pose & Koji Kondo; Underground; Airship (from Super Mario Bros.) by Retro Crowd & Koji Kondo; Super Mario Bros by Stryker Pose & Koji Kondo; Fever (from Dr. Mario) by Retro Crowd & Koji Kondo choreo. by Romain Haguenauer
2023–2024	Super Mario; Mario Bros. by Stryker Pose & Koji Kondo; Underground; Airship (from Super Mario Bros.) by Retro Crowd & Koji Kondo; Super Mario Bros by Stryker Pose & Koji Kondo; Fever (from Dr. Mario) by Retro Crowd & Koji Kondo choreo. by Romain Haguenauer	Giselle; Introduction; Act I: Retour des Vendangeurs - No. 4(bis) Valse; Act I: Pas de Deux - No. 5(bis) La Chasse (II); Act I: Galop by Adolphe Adam performed by London Symphony Orchestra and Anatole Fistoulari choreo. by Romain Haguenauer	

=== Women's singles ===
Season	Short program	Free skating
2022–2023	Carmen by Georges Bizet choreo. by Cathy Reed	Introduction and Rondo Capriccioso by Camille Saint-Saëns performed by Anne-Sophie Mutter, Saito Kinen Orchestra and Seiji Ozawa choreo. by Cathy Reed
2021–2022	Smile by Charlie Chaplin performed by Nana Mouskouri choreo. by Cathy Reed	Introduction and Rondo Capriccioso by Camille Saint-Saëns performed by Anne-Sophie Mutter, Saito Kinen Orchestra and Seiji Ozawa choreo. by Cathy Reed
2020–2021	New World Symphony by Antonín Dvořák choreo. by Cathy Reed	Star Wars: The Rise of Skywalker by John Williams choreo. by Cathy Reed
2019–2020	Csárdás by Vittorio Monti performed by David Garrett choreo. by Cathy Reed	Pride & Prejudice by Dario Marianelli choreo. by Cathy Reed

== Competitive highlights ==
JGP: Junior Grand Prix

=== Ice dance with Nishiyama ===
International
Event	23–24	24–25
Four Continents	11th	11th
GP NHK Trophy		10th
CS Golden Spin	9th	
CS Nebelhorn Trophy		WD
Asian Winter Games		3rd
National
Japan	2nd	2nd
TBD = Assigned; WD = Withdrew

=== Women's singles ===
International: Junior
Event	15–16	16–17	17–18	18–19	19–20	20–21	21–22	22–23
JGP U.S.					14th			
Egna Trophy							4th	
National
Japan							18th	
Japan Junior					10th	15th	5th	
Japan Novice			14th A	7th A				
Japan Western Sect.					8th J	6th J	3rd J	
Kinki Reg.	16th B	2nd B	4th A	3rd A	7th J	3rd J	5th J	6th J
TBD = Assigned; WD = Withdrew; C = Cancelled; A = Novice A; B = Novice B; J = Junior

== Detailed results ==
Current personal best scores are highlighted in bold.

=== With Nishiyama ===
Results in the 2024-25 season
Date	Event	SP		FS		Total	
Date	Event	P	Score	P	Score	P	Score
Nov 8–10, 2024	(Japan) 2024 NHK Trophy	10	59.15	10	92.12	10	151.27
Dec 19–22, 2024	2024–25 Japan Championships	2	66.03	2	102.89	2	168.92
Feb 11–13, 2025	(China) 2025 Asian Winter Games	3	63.21	3	100.50	3	163.71
Feb 19–23, 2025	(South Korea) 2025 Four Continents Championships	12	59.84	10	96.55	11	156.39

Results in the 2023-24 season
Date	Event	SP		FS		Total	
Date	Event	P	Score	P	Score	P	Score
Dec 6–9, 2023	(Croatia) 2023 CS Golden Spin	10	61.86	9	**96.83**	9	**158.69**
Dec 20–24, 2023	2023–24 Japan Championships	1	71.08	3	105.35	2	176.43
Jan 30 – Feb 4, 2024	(China) 2024 Four Continents Championships	11	**62.09**	12	95.54	11	157.63
