= Ting Tzu-Han =

Taiwanese figure skater

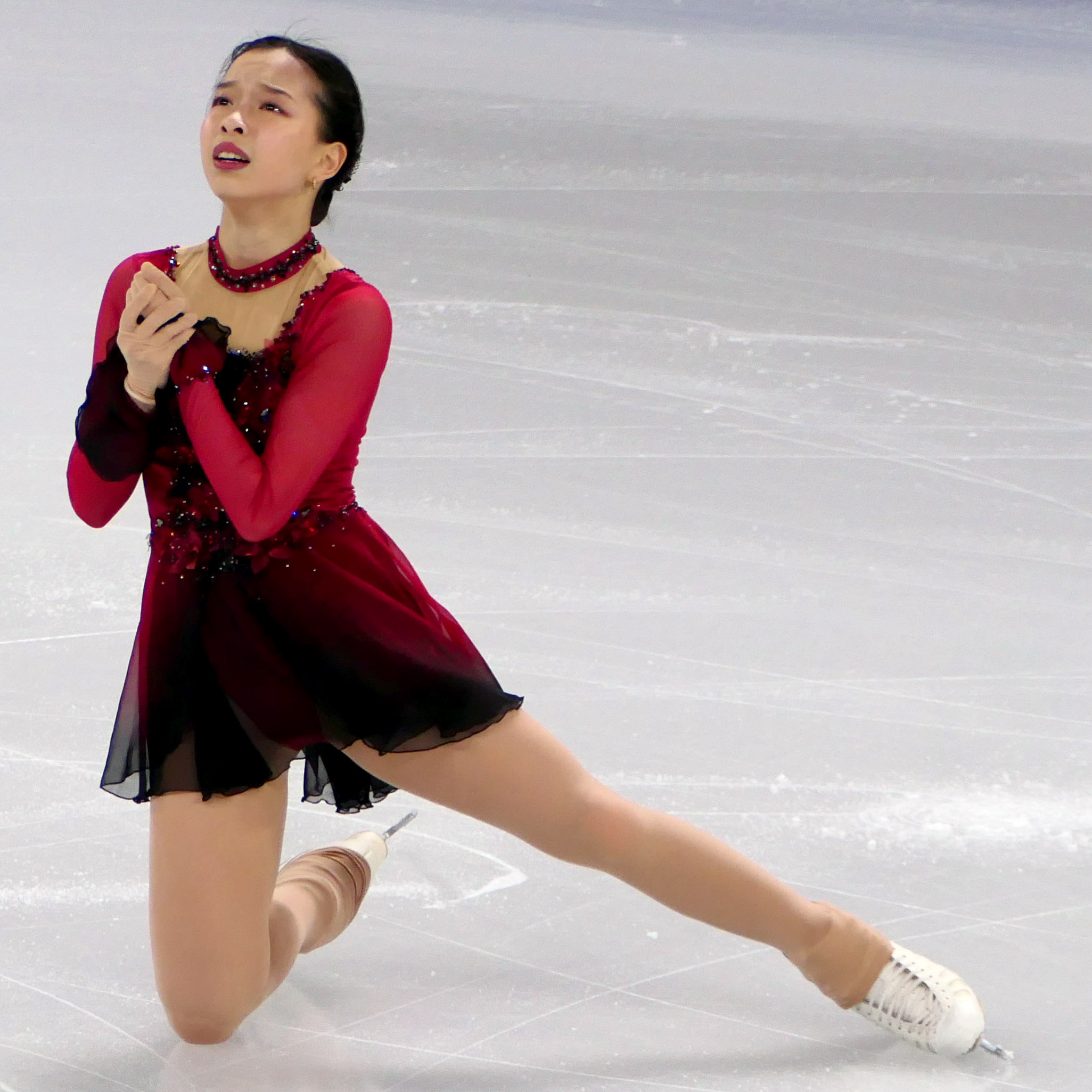
- Ting Tzu-Han at the 2024 World Championships

Personal information
- Native name: 丁子涵
- Full name: Ting Tzu-Han
- Other names: Ding Zihan; Annaveia Tzu-Han Ting
- Born: February 21, 2006 (age 20) Taipei, Taiwan
- Height: 1.52 m (5 ft 0 in)

Figure skating career
- Country: Chinese Taipei
- Discipline: Women's singles
- Coach: Chen Kuo-Wen; Joey Russell
- Skating club: Chinese Taipei Skating Union
- Began skating: 2013

Medal record
Chinese Taipei Championships
| Gold medal – first place | 2022 Taipei | Singles |
| Gold medal – first place | 2023 Taipei | Singles |
| Gold medal – first place | 2024 Taipei | Singles |

Annaveia (Anna) Tzu-Han Ting or Ting Tzu-Han (Chinese: 丁子涵; pinyin: Dīng Zǐhán; born February 21, 2006) is a Taiwanese figure skater. She is the 2022 Nordic silver medalist, the 2023 Asian Open Trophy silver medalist, the 2022 Asian Open Trophy bronze medalist, and a three-time Taiwanese national champion (2022–24).

She has represented Taiwan at the World Junior Championships, Four Continents Championships, and World Championships.

== Personal life ==
Ting was born on February 21, 2006, in Taipei, Taiwan. Her career expenses is fully funded by her parents, but supplemented by federation funding, local sponsorships, and donations. Ting attends public school and had the fourth-best grades in her class in 2019. She enjoys fashion design, piano, cooking, and skiing. Ting admires Japan's Yuzuru Hanyu as her future goal and especially likes his "Hope and Legacy" free skating program.

In fall 2024, she moved to Leeds, West Yorkshire, United Kingdom, where she began attending university in food science.

== Career ==
=== Early career ===
Ting initially started out learning inline skating before a coach believed that she had potential and encouraged her to try figure skating. She began skating at age 6.5 years after she did not fall like other beginners during her first lessons. Ting won the 2016 Taiwanese Championships in the intermediate division, the 2017 and 2018 Taiwanese Championships in the advanced novice division, and the 2019 Taiwanese Championships in the junior division.

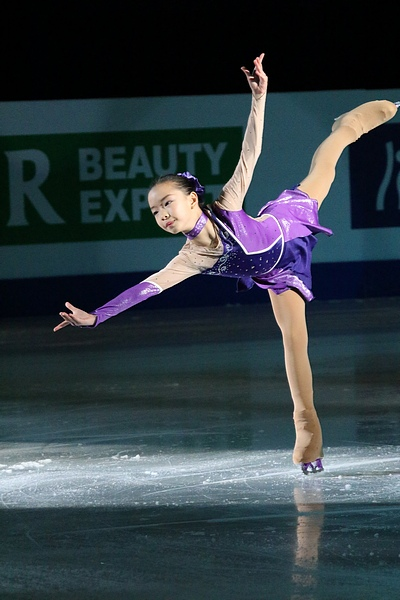
Ting at the 2016 Four Continents Championships gala

On the international level, Ting is the 2016 Asian Open Trophy basic novice A bronze medalist, the 2017–18 Southeast Asian Figure Skating Open Challenge advanced novice champion, the 2018 Rooster Cup advanced novice champion, and the 2019 Oceania International Novice champion. At the 2017 edition of the Asian Open Trophy, she was the youngest competitor in the advanced novice division, at only 11 years old.

=== 2019–2020 season ===
Ting began working in Canada at the Toronto Cricket, Skating and Curling Club with Joey Russell, in addition to training with her current coach Chen Kuo-Wen in Taipei. She won the 2020 Taiwanese junior title in early August by nearly 40 points over Mandy Chiang and Marissa Yi-Shan Wu. Ting then won the 2019 Tokyo Summer Figure Skating Competition.

Ting made her junior international debut on the 2019–20 ISU Junior Grand Prix, originally being assigned to 2019 JGP Poland and 2019 JGP Italy. She placed 11th in Poland and later withdrew from Italy. In February, Ting placed fifth in Junior Ladies I at the 2020 Bavarian Open. She qualified to the free skating segment at the 2020 World Junior Championships in Tallinn, ultimately finishing 17th overall.

=== 2020–2021 season ===
Ting won her third consecutive junior national title at the 2021 Taiwanese Championships in August. Due to the COVID-19 pandemic, the 2020–21 ISU Junior Grand Prix, where she would have competed, was canceled. Ting won the 2021 Chinese Taipei Figure Skating Elites Cup in the senior division.

=== 2021–2022 season ===
Ting was assigned to compete at the 2021 CS Nebelhorn Trophy to attempt to qualify a berth for Taiwan at the 2022 Winter Olympics. She placed tenth at the event with new personal bests in both the free skate and total score, resulting in Taiwan being the third reserve for the Olympics. She finished the fall season with a fourth place at the 2021 Asian Open and gold at the Taiwanese championships. Assigned to the 2022 Four Continents Championships in Tallinn, she finished fifteenth. Ting concluded the season by making her World Championship debut, coming in twenty-sixth position.

=== 2022–2023 season ===
In her season debut, Ting placed eighth at the 2022 CS Lombardia Trophy, before coming fourth at the 2022 CS Nebelhorn Trophy. She went on to win a bronze medal at the 2022 Asian Open Trophy, and win a second consecutive Taiwanese national title. She finished thirteenth at the 2023 Four Continents Championships.

=== 2023–2024 season ===
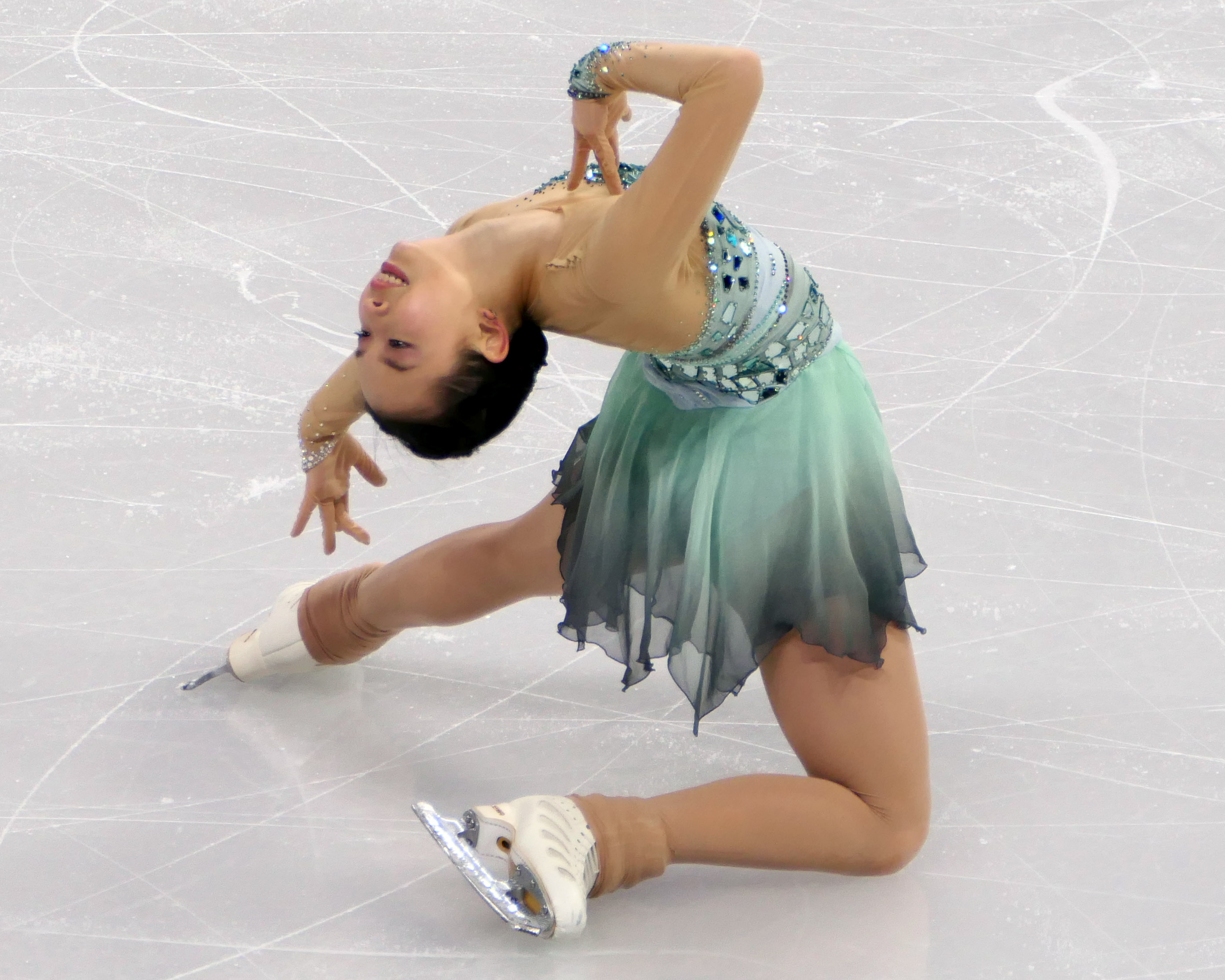
Ting during her free skate at the 2024 World Championships

Ting began the season by winning the silver medal at the 2023 Asian Open Trophy, behind An Xiangyi of China. She then finished tenth at the 2023 CS Finlandia Trophy.

After winning another Taiwanese national title, Ting came tenth at the 2024 Four Continents Championships. In her second appearance at the World Championships, she finished twenty-second.

=== 2024–2025 season ===
Ting started the season by finishing sixteenth at the 2024 CS Lombardia Trophy.

On October 23, 2024, Ting would take to her Instagram, announcing that she would be taking an indefinite break from figure skating after suffering from numerous illnesses and immunity issues during the summer off-season. She also stated that she wanted to take this time to focus on her university education.

== Programs ==
| Season | Short program | Free skating | Exhibition |
|---|---|---|---|
| 2024–2025 | Crimson Peak by Fernando Velázquez choreo. by Joey Russell | Notre-Dame de Paris by Riccardo Cocciante & Luc Plamondon choreo. by Joey Russell | |
| 2023–2024 | Crimson Peak by Fernando Velázquez choreo. by Joey Russell | Sherlock by David Arnold & Michael Price choreo. by Joey Russell | La Llorona performed by Ángela Aguilar |
| 2022–2023 | Capone by Ronan Hardiman choreo. by Joey Russell | The Phantom of the Opera by Andrew Lloyd Webber choreo. by Joey Russell | I Am Criminal (from Anna) by Éric Serra & Mitivaï Serra choreo. by Ting Tzu-Han |
| 2020–2022 | Twilight by Carter Burwell choreo. by Joey Russell | Aladdin by Alan Menken choreo. by Joey Russell | |
| 2019–2020 | Corpse Bride by Danny Elfman choreo. by Joey Russell | Finding Neverland by Jan A. P. Kaczmarek choreo. by Joey Russell | |
| 2018–2019 | Harry Potter by John Williams | The Cat Returns by Yuji Nomi | |

== Competitive highlights ==
CS: Challenger Series; JGP: Junior Grand Prix

International
| Event | 18–19 | 19–20 | 20–21 | 21–22 | 22–23 | 23–24 | 24-25 |
|---|---|---|---|---|---|---|---|
| Worlds | | | | 26th | | 22nd | |
| Four Continents | | | | 15th | 13th | 10th | |
| CS Finlandia | | | | | | 10th | |
| CS Lombardia | | | | | 8th | | 16th |
| CS Nebelhorn | | | | 10th | 4th | | |
| Asian Open | | | | 4th | 3rd | 2nd | |
| Bosphorus Cup | | | | | | 1st | |
| Nordics | | | | 2nd | | | |
| Sofia Trophy | | | | | 5th | | |
International: Junior
| Junior Worlds | | 17th | | | | | |
| JGP Poland | | 11th | | | | | |
| Bavarian Open | | 5th^{1} | | | | | |
National
| Chinese Taipei Championships | 1st J | 1st J | 1st J | 1st | 1st | 1st | |

== Detailed results ==
ISU personal best scores in the +5/-5 GOE System
| Segment | Type | Score | Event |
|---|---|---|---|
| Total | TSS | 171.87 | 2024 Four Continents Championships |
| Short program | TSS | 59.17 | 2024 Four Continents Championships |
| Short program | TES | 33.01 | 2019 JGP Poland |
| Short program | PCS | 28.03 | 2024 Four Continents Championships |
| Free skating | TSS | 112.70 | 2024 Four Continents Championships |
| Free skating | TES | 60.17 | 2022 CS Nebelhorn Trophy |
| Free skating | PCS | 54.92 | 2024 Four Continents Championships |

=== Senior level ===
2024–2025 season
| Date | Event | SP | FS | Total |
| September 13–15, 2024 | 2024 CS Lombardia Trophy | 17; 44.04 | 18; 79.10 | 16; 123.14 |
2023–2024 season
| Date | Event | SP | FS | Total |
| March 18–24, 2024 | 2024 World Championships | 22; 56.32 | 22; 101.51 | 22; 157.83 |
| Jan. 30 – Feb. 4, 2024 | 2024 Four Continents Championships | 10; 59.17 | 10; 112.70 | 10; 171.87 |
| Nov. 27 – Dec. 3, 2023 | Bosphorus Cup | 1; 63.72 | 3; 101.01 | 1; 165.53 |
| October 4–8, 2023 | 2023 CS Finlandia Trophy | 12; 52.16 | 9; 100.09 | 10; 152.25 |
| August 16–19, 2023 | 2023 Asian Open Trophy | 2; 54.85 | 4; 91.42 | 2; 146.27 |
2022–2023 season
| Date | Event | SP | FS | Total |
| February 7–12, 2023 | 2023 Four Continents Championships | 17; 45.19 | 13; 95.32 | 13; 140.51 |
| December 7–10, 2022 | 2022 Asian Open Trophy | 2; 48.48 | 3; 87.92 | 3; 136.40 |
| September 21–24, 2022 | 2022 CS Nebelhorn Trophy | 11; 49.92 | 4; 112.50 | 4; 162.42 |
| September 16–18, 2022 | 2022 CS Lombardia Trophy | 9; 53.22 | 8; 103.13 | 8; 156.35 |
2021–2022 season
| Date | Event | SP | FS | Total |
| March 21–27, 2022 | 2022 World Championships | 26; 55.24 | - | 26; 55.24 |
| January 18–23, 2022 | 2022 Four Continents Championships | 17; 49.15 | 14; 96.42 | 15; 145.57 |
| October 13–17, 2021 | 2021 Asian Open Trophy | 8; 51.84 | 3; 103.19 | 4; 155.03 |
| September 22–25, 2021 | 2021 CS Nebelhorn Trophy | 13; 51.33 | 8; 105.88 | 10; 157.21 |

=== Junior level ===
2020–2021 season
| Date | Event | SP | FS | Total |
| August 2–3, 2020 | 2020–21 Taiwanese Championships | 1; 45.97 | 1; 96.57 | 1; 142.54 |
2019–2020 season
| Date | Event | SP | FS | Total |
| March 2–8, 2020 | 2020 World Junior Championships | 22; 50.97 | 14; 98.07 | 17; 149.04 |
| February 3–9, 2020 | 2020 Bavarian Open | 4; 53.62 | 5; 96.53 | 5; 150.15 |
| September 18–21, 2019 | 2019 JGP Poland | 10; 56.27 | 13; 90.08 | 11; 146.35 |
| August 2–3, 2019 | 2019–20 Taiwanese Championships | 1; 48.22 | 1; 96.36 | 1; 144.58 |
