= Figure skating at the 2025 Asian Winter Games – Ice dance =

Ice dance at the 2025 Asian Winter Games
- Venue: Heilongjiang Multifunctional Hall
- Dates: 11–12 February 2025
- Competitors: 12 from 4 nations

Medalists
gold medal	Masaya Morita; Utana Yoshida	Japan
silver medal	Xing Jianing; Ren Junfei	China
bronze medal	Shingo Nishiyama; Azusa Tanaka	Japan

The Ice dance event at the 2025 Asian Winter Games was held on 11 and 12 February 2025 at the Heilongjiang Ice Events Training Centre Multifunctional Hall in Harbin, China.

== Schedule ==
All times are China Standard Time (UTC+08:00)

Date	Time	Event
Tuesday, 11 February 2025	14:00	Rhythm dance
Wednesday, 12 February 2025	18:00	Free dance

== Results ==
Rank	Team	RD	FD	Total
1st place, gold medalist(s)	Japan (JPN); Masaya Morita; Utana Yoshida	68.88	104.43	173.31
2nd place, silver medalist(s)	China (CHN); Xing Jianing; Ren Junfei	64.29	106.96	171.25
3rd place, bronze medalist(s)	Japan (JPN); Shingo Nishiyama; Azusa Tanaka	63.21	100.50	163.71
4	China (CHN); He Linghao; Xiao Zixi	62.64	97.34	159.98
5	Kazakhstan (KAZ); Boisangur Datiev; Gaukhar Nauryzova	55.02	87.14	142.16
6	Indonesia (INA); Dwiki Eka Ramadhan; Tasya Putri	35.51	54.63	90.14
