= Xing Jianing =

Chinese figure skater (born 2001)

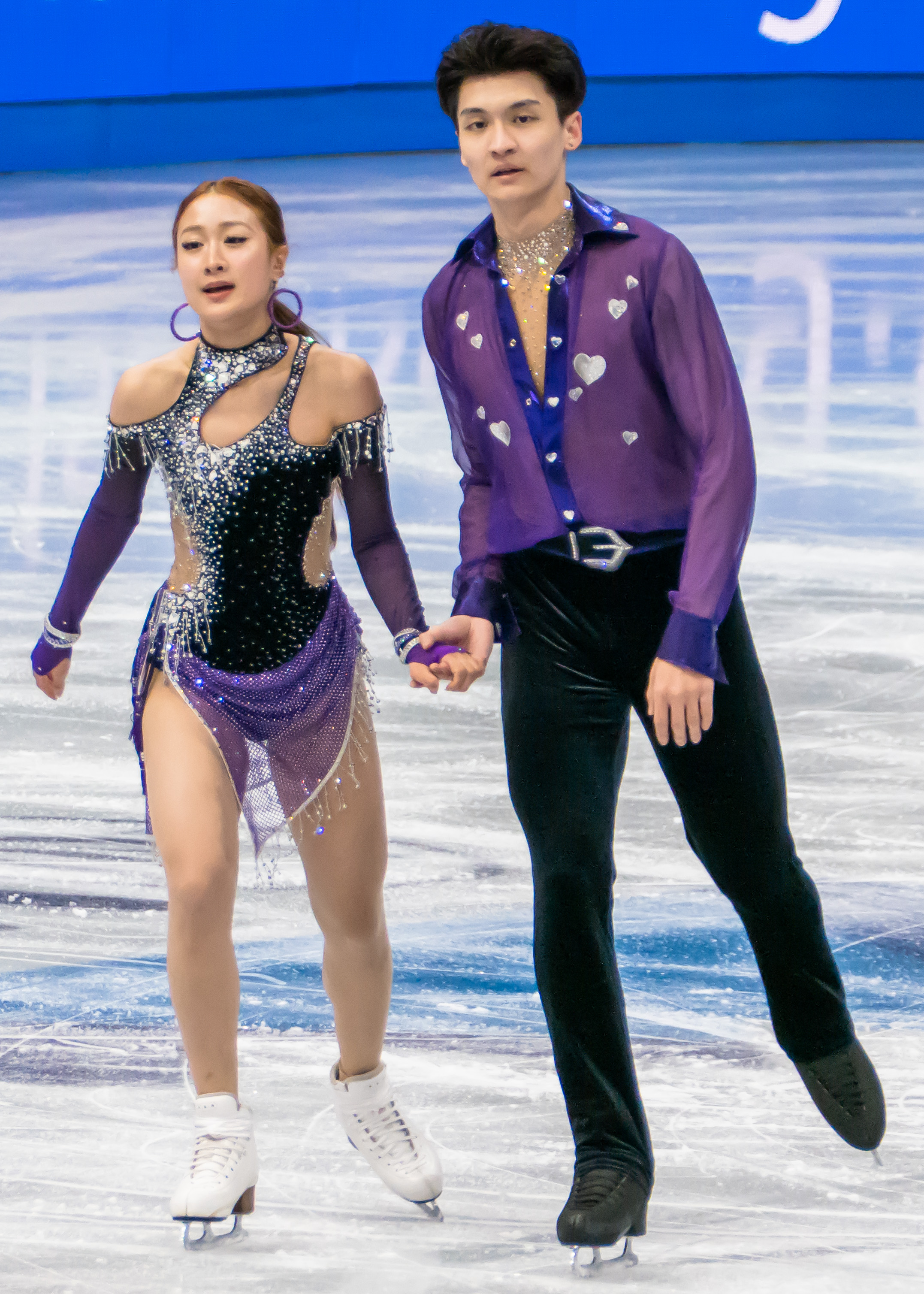
- Ren Junfei and Xing Jianing at the 2025 World Championships

Personal information
- Native name: 邢珈宁
- Full name: Xing Jianing
- Born: 8 December 2001 (age 24) Harbin, China
- Height: 1.82 m (5 ft 11 1/2 in)

Figure skating career
- Country: China
- Discipline: Ice dance
- Partner: Ren Junfei (since 2024); Chen Xizi (2017–24)
- Coach: Zheng Xun
- Skating club: Harbin Binaozhixing Skating Club
- Began skating: 2006

Medal record
Chinese Championships
Gold medal – first place	2022 Chengde	Ice dance
Gold medal – first place	2023 Chengde	Ice dance
Gold medal – first place	2024 Chengde	Ice dance

Xing Jianing
- Simplified Chinese: 邢珈宁
- Traditional Chinese: 邢珈寧
Transcriptions
Standard Mandarin
- Hanyu Pinyin: Xíng Jiāníng

Xing Jianing (Chinese: 邢珈宁; pinyin: Xíng Jiāníng; born 8 December 2001) is a Chinese ice dancer who currently competes with Ren Junfei. Together, they are the 2025 Asian Winter Games silver medalists and the 2024 Chinese national champions.

With former partner Chen Xizi, he is the 2022 and 2023 Chinese national champions.

== Programs ==
=== With Ren ===
Season	Short dance	Free dance	Exhibition
2025–26	Baby Baby by Corona, Francesco Bontempi, & Antonia Bottari; Get Up and Boogie by Corona, Francesco Bontempi, Antonia Bottari, & Ivana Spagna; Rhythm Is a Dancer by Snap! choreo. by Kaitlin Hawayek	Adiós Nonino by Astor Piazzolla choreo. by Pascal Denis	
2024–25	Hotel California; Life in the Fast Lane; James Dean by Eagles choreo. by Pascal Denis	Silver Linings by Christopher Lawrence Henderson & Landon David Hook; An Isolated Moment by Keith Merrill; The Power of Mind by Anne-Sophie Versnaeyen, Gabriel SABAN, & Philippe Briand; Catastrophic; Seasons by Adrián Berenguer choreo. by Pascal Denis	One and Only by Adele

=== With Chen ===
Season	Short dance	Free dance	Exhibition
2023–24	Get Down on It; Cherish; Celebration by Kool & the Gang choreo. by Zachary Donohue, Pascal Denis, Denis Samokhin, Maria Borovikova	Phantom’s Drama; Angel of Music by Roberto Danova choreo. by Zachary Donohue, Pascal Denis, Denis Samokhin, Maria Borovikova	Favo De Mel (from Rio 2) by Milton Nascimento; The Dance (from The Crimson Wing: Mystery of the Flamingos) by The Cinematic Orchestra
2022–23	Cha Cha: Are You Ready; Rhumba: Cuando Pienso En Ti; Samba: Latin Music	The Young Victoria; The First Waltz; The King's Birthday by Ilan Eshkeri	
2019–20	The Sound of Music Live!; Do-Re-Mi performed by Grace Rundhaug; Sixteen Going on Seventeen performed by Ariane Rinehart choreo. by Pascal Denis	They Don't Care About Us by Michael Jackson; Imagine by John Lennon performed by Glee Cast choreo. by Pascal Denis	
2018–19	Tango: La cumparsita by Gerardo Matos Rodríguez performed by Jamie White, Zheng Xun	Caught Out in the Rain by Beth Hart; Another One Bites the Dust by Queen choreo. by Jamie White, Zheng Xun	

== Competitive highlights ==
- GP – Event of the ISU Grand Prix Series
- JGP – Event of the ISU Junior Grand Prix Series
- CS – Event of the ISU Challenger Series
- TBD – Assigned
- WD – Withdrew from competition

=== Ice dance with Ren Junfei ===
Competition placements at senior level
Season	2024–25	2025–26	2026–27
World Championships	31st	24th	
Four Continents Championships	12th	11th	
Chinese Championships	1st		
GP Cup of China	9th	8th	9th
CS Budapest Trophy	11th		
CS Trophée Métropole Nice	9th		
Asian Winter Games	2nd		
Denkova-Staviski Cup		3rd	
Shanghai Trophy	3rd		

=== Ice dance with Chen Xizi ===
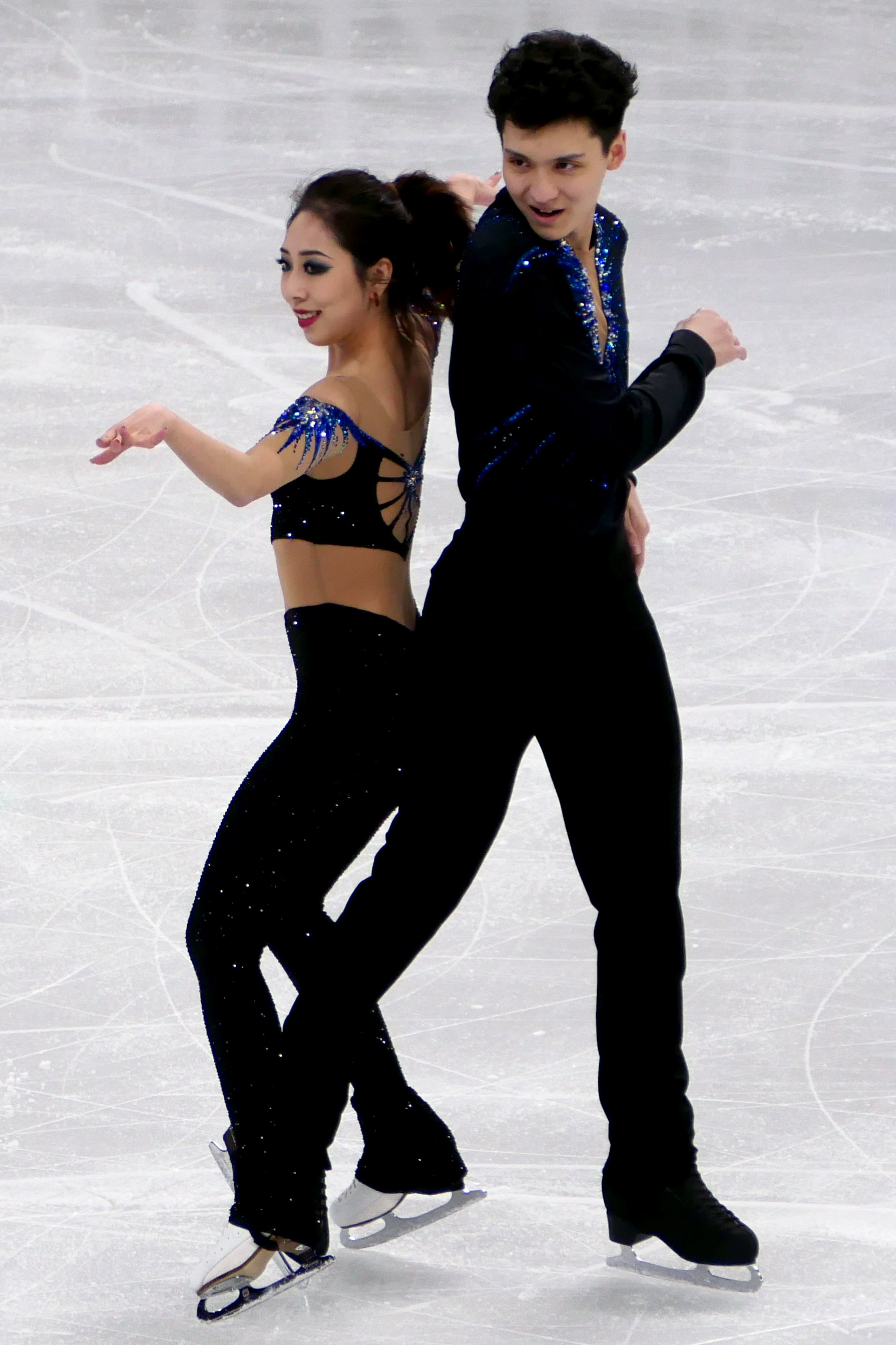
Chen/Xing at the 2025 World Championships

Competition placements at senior level
Season	2017–18	2022–23	2023–24
World Championships		25th	30th
Four Continents Championships			12th
Chinese Championships	7th	1st	1st
GP Cup of China			8th
Santa Claus Cup		5th	
Shanghai Trophy			5th

Competition placements at junior level
Season	2018–19	2019–20
World Junior Championships	24th	
Chinese Championships		1st
JGP Austria	11th	
JGP Canada	10th	
JGP France		13th
JGP Italy		11th
Mentor Cup	15th	
Russian-Chinese Winter Youth Games	4th	

== Detailed results ==
=== Ice dance with Ren Junfei ===
Results in the 2024–25 season
Date	Event	RD		FD		Total	
Date	Event	P	Score	P	Score	P	Score
Oct 3–5, 2024	(China) 2024 Shanghai Trophy	4	57.83	3	94.11	3	151.94
Oct 11–13, 2024	(Hungary) 2024 CS Budapest Trophy	12	57.79	10	95.14	11	152.93
Nov 22–24, 2024	2024 Cup of China	9	61.64	9	94.87	9	156.51
Nov 28 – Dec 1, 2024	(China) 2024 Chinese Championships	1	69.24	1	105.40	1	174.64
Feb 11–13, 2025	(China) 2025 Asian Winter Games	2	64.29	1	106.96	2	171.25
Feb 19–23, 2025	(South Korea) 2025 Four Continents Championships	11	59.88	11	95.37	12	155.25
Mar 26–30, 2025	(United States) 2025 World Championships	31	56.05	—N/a	—N/a	31	56.05

Results in the 2025-26 season
Date	Event	RD		FD		Total	
Date	Event	P	Score	P	Score	P	Score
Oct 24-26, 2025	2025 Cup of China	9	59.74	8	93.43	8	153.17
Nov 7-9, 2025	(Bulgaria) 2025 Denkova-Staviski Cup	2	66.88	3	102.11	3	168.99
Jan 21-25, 2026	(China) 2026 Four Continents Championships	10	61.55	10	97.12	10	158.67
Mar 24–29, 2026	(Czech Republic) 2026 World Championships	24	63.75	—N/a	—N/a	24	63.75

=== Ice dance with Chen Xizi ===
2023–24 season
Date	Event	SP	FS	Total
18–24 March 2024	2024 World Championships	30; 58.80	-	30; 58.80
30 January–4 February 2024	2024 Four Continents Championships	12; 61.10	11; 96.47	12; 157.57
22–24 December 2023	2023 Chinese Championships	1; 67.96	1; 97.64	1; 165.60
10–12 November 2023	2023 Cup of China	8; 62.05	8; 97.67	8; 159.72
3–5 October 2023	2023 Shanghai Trophy	5; 63.98	5; 91.01	5; 154.99
2022–23 season
Date	Event	SP	FS	Total
20–26 March 2023	2023 Worlds Championships	25; 58.12	-	25; 58.12
11–13 January 2023	2022 Chinese Championships	1; 67.23	1; 100.48	1; 167.71
28 November–4 December 2022	2022 Santa Claus Cup	1; 67.23	1; 100.48	1; 167.71
