= I Stand (album) =

Studio album by Idina Menzel
- Released: January 29, 2008
- Recorded: 2007
- Length: 38:29
- Labels: Warner Bros.; Reprise
- Producer: Glen Ballard

Idina Menzel chronology
Here (2004)	I Stand (2008)	Live: Barefoot at the Symphony (2012)

Singles from I Stand
- 1. "Brave" Released: November 6, 2007; 2. "Gorgeous" Released: December 25, 2007

I Stand is the third studio album by American singer-songwriter Idina Menzel, released on January 29, 2008. The album was produced by Glen Ballard, who co-wrote most of the songs with Menzel. It was Menzel's first commercially successful album and her first album to chart.

== Promotion ==
=== Singles and EPs ===
The first single, a Alternative pop version of Defying Gravity, was released in March 2007, even though the track was only included on the UK and iTunes editions of the album. An EP, also titled Defying Gravity, was released two months later, featuring five different remixes of the track. Another version, featuring five DJ remixes, was also released. The song Brave was released as the second single in November 2007.

The lead single Gorgeous was released in December 2007, alongside an EP featuring five remixes of the song. Each remix was edited down for the EP but could be purchased in full-length as a single. Three additional remixes of the song were released on a new EP in January 2008, all available in their longer, single forms. In August 2008, Menzel released the EP Acoustic. The EP features acoustic versions of I Stand, Brave, Gorgeous, and Better to Have Loved.

In April 2010, Idina released the EP Idina Menzel, which features album versions of I Stand, Gorgeous, and Brave as well as Embraceable You, Defying Gravity, and No Day But Today, which were recorded live on her tour.

=== Tour ===
To promote the album, Menzel embarked on the I Stand tour on April 1, 2008, in New Brunswick, NJ. Her concert at Rose Hall at Lincoln Center was filmed for a PBS special on the show Soundstage. The tour ran for four sold-out legs before ending on March 29, 2009. She performed a total of 50 concerts on the tour.

=== Music videos ===
A music video for "I Stand" was released on her YouTube channel on August 15, 2008. "Brave"'s music video was also released on the channel as well as on iTunes.

== Reception ==
Professional ratings
Review scores
Source	Rating
AllMusic	3/5 stars

AllMusic's Matthew Chisling wrote that Menzel's powerful vocals demonstrate considerable potential on I Stand, but felt that the songs themselves do not fully support her talent.

== Commercial performance ==
The album debuted at number 58 on the Billboard 200, making it Menzel's first album to debut on this chart. The album also peaked at number 54 on the UK Albums Chart. The single "Gorgeous" reached number 3 on Billboard's Hot Dance Club Songs chart for the chart week of March 15, 2008, and "Brave" charted at #19 on the Adult Contemporary chart.

As of March 2014, the album has sold 80,000 copies in the United States.

== Track listing ==
All songs written by Idina Menzel and Glen Ballard except where noted.

Standard edition
No.	Title	Writer(s)	Length
1.	"I Stand"		3:40
2.	"Better to Have Loved"		3:58
3.	"Brave"		4:39
4.	"Gorgeous"	Menzel, Dave Bassett	3:48
5.	"Where Do I Begin"		3:27
6.	"Don't Let Me Down"	Peter-John Vettese, James Blunt	3:43
7.	"I Feel Everything"		3:12
8.	"Forever"	Menzel	3:53
9.	"My Own Worst Enemy"		4:34
10.	"Perfume and Promises"	Menzel, Vettese	3:40

UK edition
No.	Title	Writer(s)	Length
11.	"Defying Gravity"	Stephen Schwartz	3:46
12.	"God Give Me Strength"	Burt Bacharach, Elvis Costello	4:05
13.	"Brave" (UK Mix)		4:34
14.	"Gorgeous" (Craig C Master Mix)	Menzel, Bassett	7:27

Special Edition bonus tracks
No.	Title	Writer(s)	Length
11.	"Let Me Fall"	Bethany Joy Lenz	3:36
12.	"I Stand" (Acoustic version)		3:04

iTunes bonus tracks
No.	Title	Writer(s)	Length
11.	"Brave" (Acoustic version)		4:38
12.	"Defying Gravity"	Schwartz	3:46

Barnes & Noble bonus track
No.	Title	Writer(s)	Length
11.	"Gorgeous" (Acoustic version)	Menzel, Bassett	3:48

Borders bonus track
No.	Title	Writer(s)	Length
11.	"God Give Me Strength"	Bacharach, Costello	4:05

== Personnel ==
- Idina Menzel – vocals
- Glen Ballard – producer

Credits are adapted from the liner notes.
