= I Stand Alone =

I Stand Alone may refer to:

- I Stand Alone (film) (Seul contre tous), a 1998 French film directed by Gaspar Noé
- I Stand Alone (Agnetha Fältskog album), 1987
- I Stand Alone (Al Kooper album), 1968
- I Stand Alone (Ramblin' Jack Elliott album), 2006
- "I Stand Alone" (Godsmack song), 2002
- "I Stand Alone" (Takako Matsu song), 1997
- "I Stand Alone", a song by Jackyl from Jackyl, 1992
- "I Stand Alone", a song by Steve Perry from the film Quest for Camelot, 1998

== See also ==
- "Alone I Stand", a song by Killswitch Engage from Incarnate, 2016
