= One (A Chorus Line song) =

Song by Marvin Hamlisch and Ed Kleban

"One" is a song from the musical A Chorus Line, with music by Marvin Hamlisch and lyrics by Ed Kleban.

A Chorus Line is framed around a group of dancers auditioning for roles in the chorus line of a musical; within the narrative, "One" is a song in the musical that the dancers are auditioning for, its lyrics a celebration of the musical's (unseen) star. "One" appears twice in A Chorus Line, first during the audition as the dancers struggle to memorize the choreography, and then at the close of the show as the eventual Broadway performance of the successful auditioners. In the final performance of "One", the dancers, whom the audience has come to know as individuals over the course of the show, wear identical costumes and become indistinguishable from each other as anonymous backup performers.

== Production ==
Director Michael Bennett explained his view regarding the song's inception and placement within the show:

I want the audience to walk out of the theatre saying, 'Those kids shouldn't be in a chorus!' And I want people in the audience to go to other shows and think about what's really gone into making that chorus . . . It fades with them kicking. That's it. That's the end of the show. There are no bows. I don't believe in bows, just the fade out. That's what a dancer's life is.

Lyricist Edward Kleban described the song as difficult to write, because the lyrics had to "say nothing and everything at the same time."

== Critical reception ==
CityBeat described the song as "the show’s greatest emotional wallop". The Davis Enterprise dubbed it the show's "signature tune". In June 2026, CBS News included the song in its list of the 250 essential American songs of the past 250 years.

== Other media ==
In 1976, the Brady family performed the song in the pilot episode of The Brady Bunch Variety Hour.

On Sesame Street, it was covered by 10 Muppet numbers in a chorus line.

The Simpsons parodied the song in the episode "Treehouse of Horror V".

Catherine Zeta-Jones performed the song, with modified lyrics, in dedication to her husband Michael Douglas during the 2009 AFI Lifetime Achievement Award Ceremony.
