= I Can Do That (A Chorus Line song) =

Song from the musical A Chorus Line

"I Can Do That" is a song from the musical A Chorus Line.

== Production ==
As with the rest of the musical numbers in A Chorus Line, this song was inspired by real-life stories of dancers. CityBeat explains "nervous Mike...tells how he took over his sister’s dance class opportunity".

== Critical reception ==
TheatrePeople described the musical style as "lively jazz swing", while MovieMet called it "an energetic, post-Vaudevillian song-and-dance" and added it "will remind film fans of Donald O’Connor’s “Make ‘em Laugh” routine from “Singin’ in the Rain”". Dance Informa deemed it a "potentially exuberant number", and Stage Whispers described it as "cute". It has also been described as a "high-energy number".
