= Skirda =

Skirda (Russian: Скирда) is a Russian surname. The male and female forms are the same.

Notable people with this surname include:

- Alexandre Skirda (born 1942), French anarchist
- Mikhail Skirda (ru) (1904-1979), Soviet general
- Ilia Skirda (born 2002), Russian figure skater
