= Camille Kovalev =

French pair skater (born 1994)

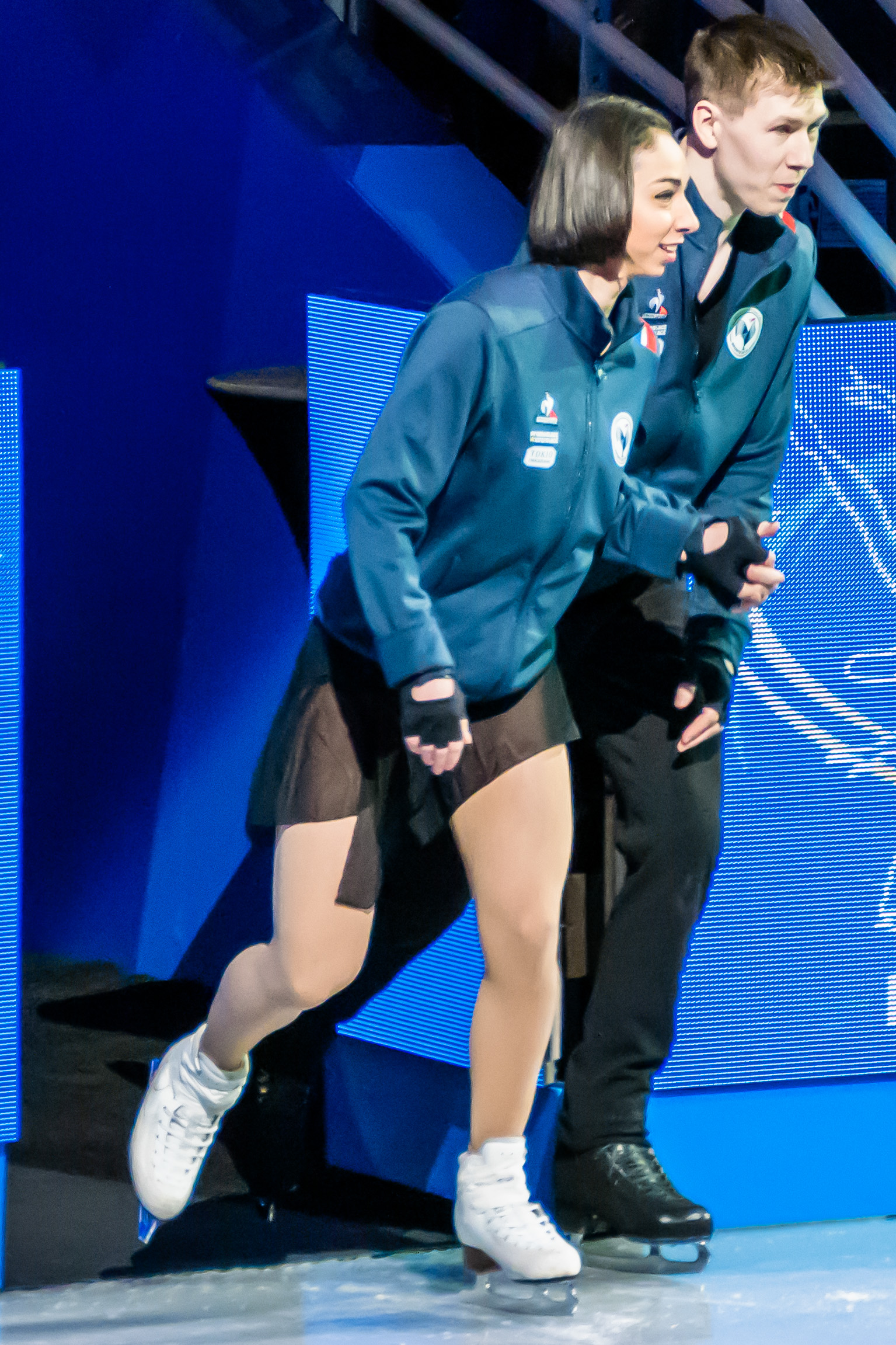
- Camille and Pavel Kovalev at the 2025 World Championships

Personal information
- Other names: Camille Mendoza
- Born: 29 November 1994 (age 31) Toulouse, France
- Home town: Angers, France
- Height: 1.60 m (5 ft 3 in)

Figure skating career
- Country: France
- Discipline: Pair skating
- Partner: Pavel Kovalev (since 2014); Christopher Boyadji (2011–12)
- Coach: Bruno Massot
- Skating club: Club Olympique de Courbevoie
- Began skating: 2000

Medal record
French Championships
Gold medal – first place	2022 Cergy-Pontoise	Pairs
Gold medal – first place	2023 Rouen	Pairs
Gold medal – first place	2024 Vaujany	Pairs
Gold medal – first place	2025 Annecy	Pairs
Gold medal – first place	2026 Briancon	Pairs
Silver medal – second place	2016 Épinal	Pairs
Silver medal – second place	2020 Dunkirk	Pairs
Bronze medal – third place	2017 Caen	Pairs
Bronze medal – third place	2019 Vaujany	Pairs

Camille Kovalev (née Mendoza; born 29 November 1994 in Toulouse) is a French pair skater. With Pavel Kovalev, she is a two-time ISU Grand Prix medalist, 2018 Volvo Open Cup silver medalist, 2015 International Cup of Nice bronze medalist, 2015 Lombardia Trophy bronze medalist, and is a five-time French national champion (2022–26).

Earlier in her career, she skated with Christopher Boyadji and competed in the final segment at the 2012 World Junior Championships.

== Personal life ==
Kovalev was born on 29 November 1994 in Toulouse, France. She married her skating partner, Pavel Kovalev, in December 2017 and subsequently adopted his last name.

== Career ==
=== Early career ===
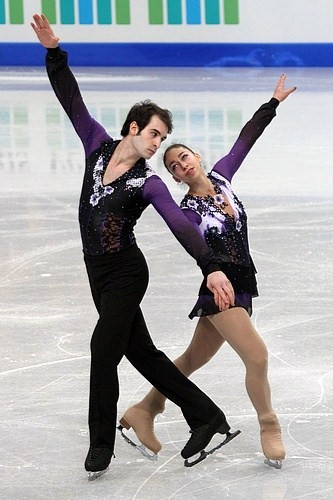
Camille Kovalev and Christopher Boyadji at the 2012 World Junior Championships

Kovalev began figure skating in 2000 at the age of six. She began competing as a pair skater in 2011 after teaming up with Christopher Boyadji. Coached by Vivien Rolland and Diana Skotnicka, Kovalev/Boyadji represented the Club Olympique de Courbevoie. They competed at the 2012 World Junior Championships, where they finished sixteenth. Their partnership eventually dissolved following the 2011–12 figure skating season.

=== Pair skating with Pavel Kovalev ===
==== 2014–2015 season: Debut of Kovalev/Kovalev ====
In 2014, it was announced that Kovalev had teamed up with Russian pair skater, Pavel Kovalev and that they would be coached by Medhi Bouzzine and that they would represent the Club Olympique de Courbevoie.

Their first competition as a team was at the 2014 Master's de Patinage, although they withdrew from the event after placing third in the short program. They subsequently competed at the 2014 NRW Trophy and the 2015 Bavarian Open, finishing fourth at both events.

==== 2015–2016 season ====
The Kovalevs started the season by winning their first international medal together, a bronze at the 2015 Lombardia Trophy. They then went on to win silver at the 2015 Master's de Patinage and bronze at the 2015 Trophée Métropole Nice Côte d'Azur.

In December, the Kovalevs won silver at the 2016 French Championships. They then closed the season with a fourth-place finish at the 2016 Bavarian Open.

==== 2016–2017 season ====
Beginning the season with a gold medal win at the 2016 Master's de Patinage, the Kovalevs subsequently finished sixth at the 2016 Trophée Métropole Nice Côte d'Azur and fourth at the 2016 CS Tallinn Trophy.

They ended the season by winning bronze at the 2017 French Championships.

==== 2017–2018 season ====
The Kovalevs started the season by winning bronze at the 2017 Master's de Patinage. They then competed at the 2017 Trophée Métropole Nice Côte d'Azur and the 2017 CS Tallinn Trophy, finishing eighth and fifth, respectively.

==== 2018–2019 season ====
The Kovalevs began the season by winning silver at the 2018 Master's de Patinage and at the 2018 Volvo Open Cup. They then concluded the season by winning bronze at the 2019 French Championships.

==== 2019–2020 season ====
Beginning the season at the 2020 Master's de Patinage, the Kovalevs won the gold medal. They then went on to compete on the 2019–20 ISU Challenger Series, finishing thirteenth at the 2019 CS Warsaw Cup and seventeenth at the 2019 CS Golden Spin of Zagreb.

In December, the Kovalevs won their second national silver medal at the 2020 French Championships.

==== 2020–2021 season ====
The Kovalevs only competed at one event in the 2020-2021 season, the 2020 Master's de Patinage, where they won the bronze medal.

==== 2021–2022 season: First national title and World Championship debut ====
In fall 2021, it was announced that the Kovalevs were now being coached by Laurent Depouilly in Courbevoie. They started the season by finishing seventh at the 2021 CS Lombardia Trophy. Making their Grand Prix series debut at the 2021 Internationaux de France, the pair came in seventh place.

In December, they won their first national title at the 2022 French Championships. With this result, the Kovalevs were selected to represent France at the European and World Championships for a first time. At the 2022 European Championships in Tallinn, Estonia, they came in fourteenth place.

In March 2022, the International Skating Union banned athletes representing Russia from competing at international events as a result of their invasion of Ukraine. In addition, the Chinese Skating Association opted not to send any athletes to compete at the 2022 World Championships in Montpellier, France. Because of this, the Kovalevs finished World Championships with a strong eighth-place.

==== 2022–2023 season: First Grand Prix medal ====
The Kovalevs began the season by finishing sixth at the 2022 CS Nebelhorn Trophy before going on to win gold at the 2022 Master's de Patinage.

Going on to compete on the 2022–23 Grand Prix circuit, the pair won their first Grand Prix medal, a silver, at the 2022 Grand Prix de France. They subsequently finished fifth at the 2022 NHK Trophy.

In December, the Kovalevs won the national title for a second consecutive time at the 2023 French Championships. Named to the European and World team, the Kovalevs finished sixth at the 2023 European Championships in Espoo, Finland and fourteenth at the 2023 World Championships in Saitama, Japan.

Selected to compete for Team France in the pairs discipline at the 2023 World Team Trophy, the pair individually placed fifth and Team France finished in fifth place overall.

==== 2023–2024 season: Second Grand Prix medal ====
The Kovalevs started the season by winning gold at the 2023 John Nicks Pairs Challenge. Following a ninth-place finish at the 2023 CS Autumn Classic International, the pair won gold for a fourth time at the 2023 Master's de Patinage. They subsequently competed at the 2023 CS Finlandia Trophy, where they placed fifth.

Competing on the 2023–24 Grand Prix circuit, the Kovalevs won the bronze medal at the 2023 Grand Prix de France. “We are so happy,” said Camille. “We came here with the goal to win a medal and we did it. We fought until the end to get it!” They went on to finish fifth at the 2023 Grand Prix of Espoo. In December, they won their third national title at the 2024 French Championships.

The pair then went on to compete at the 2024 European Championships in Kaunas, Lithuania, despite Camille developing a fever two days before the event. During the short program, Camille had a very hard fall on the throw triple flip, landing on her chest. She then fell again on the side-by-side triple toe. As a result of these mistakes, the pair only placed fifteenth in the short program. They ended up withdrawing before the free skate due to Camille's illness. The Kovalevs subsequently competed at the 2024 International Challenge Cup, where they took the bronze medal.

Weeks before the 2024 World Championships, the Kovalevs announced that they would not compete at the event due to Pavel injuring himself from a very bad fall in training.

In June, the pair announced that while continuing their coaching relationship with Laurent Depouilly, that they would begin training at the ASGA Figure Skating Club.

==== 2024–2025 season ====
The Kovalev's at the 2025 World Championships

During the off-season, Pavel dislocated his ankle and underwent surgery during the summer. He also injured his back shortly after

returning to the ice, and would subsequently be forced to miss another two weeks of training. The Kovalevs, having initially been told by doctors that they would likely need to sit out of the beginning of the season, Pavel was eventually cleared to skate at the 2024 Master's de Patinage in late September, much earlier than the couple had expected. They ultimately won silver at the event. They subsequently finished sixth at the 2024 Tayside Trophy.

Going on to compete on the 2024–25 Grand Prix circuit, the Kovalevs finished seventh at the 2024 Grand Prix de France and sixth at the 2024 Cup of China.

In late December, the Kovalevs won their fourth national title at the 2025 French Championships.

The Kovalevs then competed at the 2025 European Championships in Tallinn, Estonia, where they finished ninth overall. They subsequently finished fourth at the Road to 26 Trophy in Milan, Italy, a test event for the 2026 Winter Olympics.

Selected to compete at the 2025 World Championships in Boston, Massachusetts, United States, the Kovalevs placed twenty-first in the short program and did not advance to the free skate segment. They then closed the season by competing for Team France at the 2025 World Team Trophy, placing sixth in all segments of the pairs event and Team France finished fourth overall.

==== 2025–2026 season: Milano Cortina Olympics ====
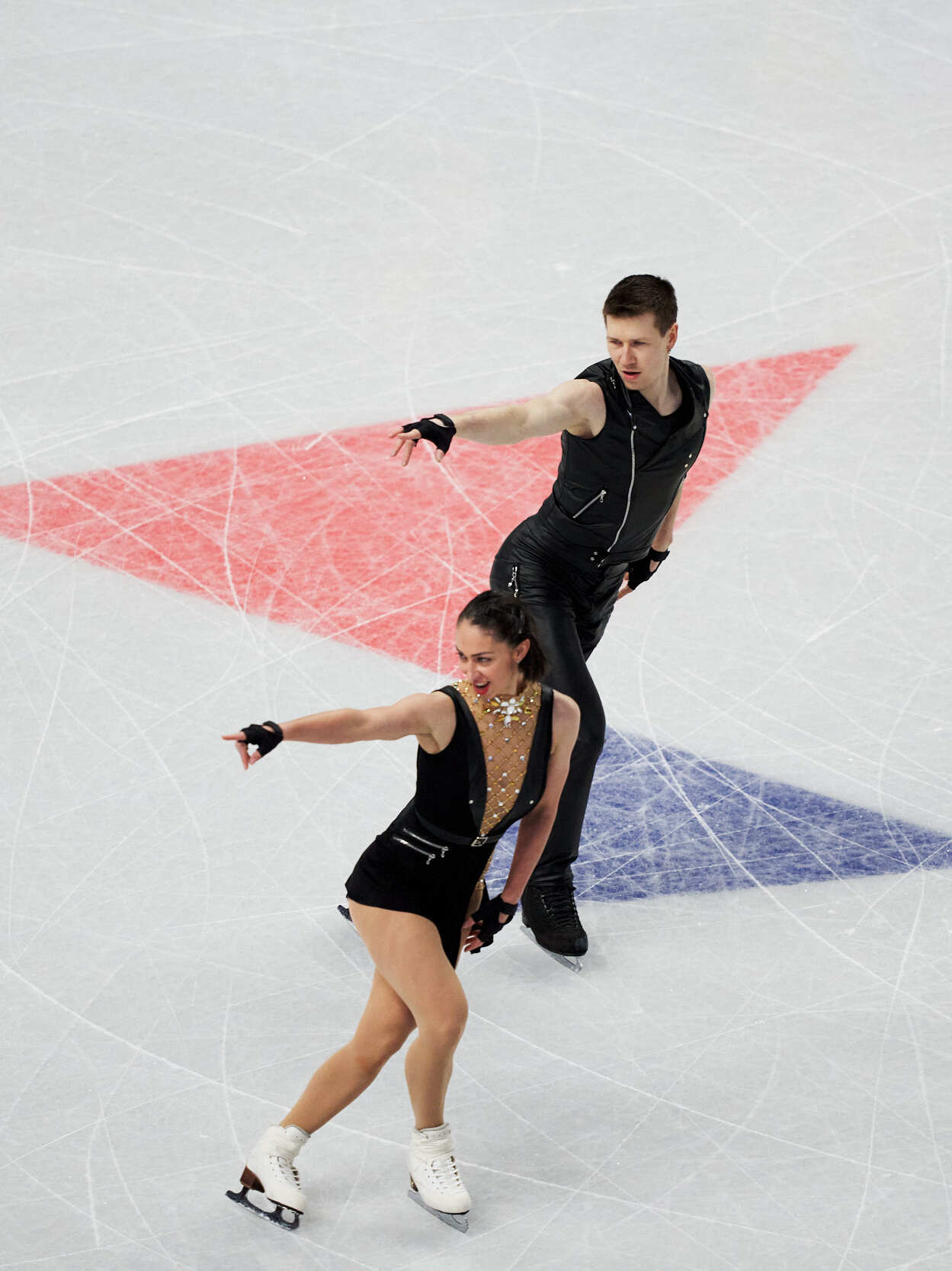
Kovalev's performing at the 2026 World Championships

In June, the Kovalevs announced that they had made a coaching change from Laurent Depouilly to Bruno Massot.

They opened the season by winning gold at the 2025 Master's de Patinage. They then competed at the 2025 Skate to Milano, the final Olympic qualifying event. At the event, the Kovalevs placed second in the short program and fifth in the free skate, placing fourth overall. Due to this placement, Team France was given the first alternate spot for pair skating at the 2026 Winter Olympics.

Going on to compete on the 2025–26 Grand Prix series, the Kovalevs finished sixth at the 2025 Grand Prix de France. They went on to compete at the 2025 NHK Trophy, however, Camille sustained a shoulder injury following a fall on their side-by-side triple toe attempt in the short program. As a result, the team was forced to withdraw. According to their coach, Bruno Massot, the injury involved a dislocation, but the available three-minute injury recovery period was insufficient for her to resume skating. Kovalev did not require immediate hospital treatment and was expected to undergo further evaluation upon returning home.

In December, the Kovalevs competed at the 2026 French Championships, where they won their fifth national title. They were subsequently named to the 2026 Winter Olympic team to compete in the figure skating team event. The following month, the Kovalevs competed at the 2026 European Championships in Sheffield, England, United Kingdom, where they finished in tenth place.

Less than two weeks before the start of the 2026 Winter Olympics, it was announced that the Winter Sports Association of Uzbekistan had reliquinshed their sole Olympic pair skating spot. As the first alternates, the Kovalevs were selected to compete in the Games' individual pair event.

On February 6, the Kovalevs placed seventh in the short program in the 2026 Winter Olympics Figure Skating Team Event. Paula Slater says, “There’s so much to enjoy here,” said Camille. “Honestly, everything. It feels like a dream come true. Every moment, we try to take pictures, look around, see what’s happening next, what we can do next. I really feel like a kid in Disneyland!”

==== 2026–2027 season ====
The pair opened their season with a 6th place finish at the 2026 Kinoshita Group Cup.

== Programs ==
=== With Pavel Kovalev ===
Season	Short program	Free skating	Exhibition
2026–2027	Ameksa by Taalbi Brothers	Days Gone Quiet by Lewis Capaldi	
2025–2026	Une vie d'amour by Charles Aznavour performed by Mireille Mathieu & Charles Aznavour choreo. by Pavel Kovalev, Dominique Deniaud	Come Together by The Beatles performed by Gary Clark Jr. & Junkie XL; After Dark (from From Dusk till Dawn) by Tito & Tarantula & Steven Hufsteter; Seven Nation Army by The White Stripes choreo. by Pavel Kovalev, Dominique Deniaud	Maison by Emilio Piano & Lucie
2024–2025	Toxic performed by 2WEI; Toxic by Britney Spears; Lordly by Feder all arranged by Maxime Rodriguez choreo. by Polen Gezmiş, Pavel Kovalev	Manners Maketh Man (from Kingsman: The Secret Service) by Henry Jackman & Matthew Margeson; Gun Barrel (from No Time to Die) by Hans Zimmer; A Terrible Choice (from Mission: Impossible – Fallout) by Lorne Balfe; No Time to Die (from No Time to Die) by Billie Eilish; No Time to Die (M+ike remix) (from No Time to Die) by Billie Eilish all arranged by Maxime Rodriguez choreo. by Dominique Deniaud, Nathalie Depouilly	Unknown (To You) by Jacob Banks
2023–2024	The Feeling Begins (Remix) by Peter Gabriel arranged by Jesuss In Matthew & Maxime Rodriguez; Prince of Persia (Electrosila digital mix) by DJ Riga et Matisse & Maxime Rodriguez choreo. by Dominique Deniaud, Nathalie Depouilly	Manners Maketh Man (from Kingsman: The Secret Service) by Henry Jackman & Matthew Margeson; Gun Barrel (from No Time to Die) by Hans Zimmer; A Terrible Choice (from Mission: Impossible – Fallout) by Lorne Balfe; No Time to Die (from No Time to Die) by Billie Eilish; No Time to Die (M+ike remix) (from No Time to Die) by Billie Eilish all arranged by Maxime Rodriguez choreo. by Dominique Deniaud, Nathalie Depouilly	
2022–2023	My Boy; Bad Guy by Billie Eilish arranged by Maxime Rodriguez choreo. by Dominique Deniaud	Caruso by Lucio Dalla performed by Florent Pagny arranged by Maxime Rodriguez choreo. by Nathalie Depouilly	Natural by Imagine Dragons
2021–22	Libertango by Astor Piazzolla performed by The Swingles choreo. by Dominique Deniaud	The Curse by Agnes Obel choreo. by Nathalie Depouilly	
2018–19		What Love Can Be by Kingdom Come	
2017–18	Long Tall Sally by Little Richard; Bleeding Love by Leona Lewis performed by The Baseballs	What Love Can Be by Kingdom Come	
2016–17	Long Tall Sally by Little Richard; Bleeding Love by Leona Lewis performed by The Baseballs		
2015–16	Iron Sky by Paolo Nutini choreo. by Léonie Corbin	To Build a Home by The Cinematic Orchestra choreo. by Léonie Corbin	
2014–15	Industrial Revolution, Part 2 by Nic Raine choreo. by Léonie Corbin	The Earth Prelude by Ludovico Einaudi choreo. by Léonie Corbin	

=== With Christopher Boyadji ===
Season	Short program	Free skating
2011–12	Mr. & Mrs. Smith by John Powell choreo. by Muriel Zazoui, Romain Haguenauer	Pearl Harbor by Hans Zimmer choreo. by Muriel Zazoui, Romain Haguenauer

== Competitive highlights ==
- GP – Event of the ISU Grand Prix Series
- CS – Event of the ISU Challenger Series
- JGP – Event of the ISU Junior Grand Prix Series
- TBD – Assigned
- WD – Withdrew from competition
- Medals at team events are awarded for the team results only. Individual placements at team events are listed in parentheses.

=== Pair skating with Pavel Kovalev ===
Competition placements at senior level
Season	2014–15	2015–16	2016–17	2017–18	2018–19	2019–20	2020–21	2021–22	2022–23	2023–24	2024–25	2025–26	2026–27
Winter Olympics												16th	
Winter Olympics (Team event)												6th (7th)	
World Championships								8th	14th		21st	17th	
European Championships								14th	6th	WD	9th	10th	
French Championships		2nd	3rd		3rd	2nd		1st	1st	1st	1st	1st	
World Team Trophy									5th (5th)		4th (6th)		
GP Cup of China											6th		
GP Finland										5th			
GP France								7th	2nd	3rd	7th	6th	5th
GP NHK Trophy									5th			WD	
CS Autumn Classic										9th			
CS Finlandia Trophy										5th			
CS Golden Spin of Zagreb						17th					6th		
CS Nebelhorn Trophy									6th				
CS Tallinn Trophy			4th	5th									
CS Warsaw Cup						13th							
CS Kinoshita Cup													6th
Challenge Cup										3rd			
Cup of Nice		3rd	6th	8th									
John Nicks Challenge										1st			
Lombardia Trophy		3rd						7th					
Master's de Patinage	WD	2nd	1st	3rd	2nd	1st	3rd		1st	1st	2nd	1st	
NRW Trophy	4th												
Road to 26 Trophy											4th		
Skate to Milano												4th	
Tayside Trophy											6th		
Volvo Open Cup					2nd								
Bavarian Open	4th	4th											

=== Pair skating with Christopher Boyadji ===
Competition placements at junior level
Season	2011–12
World Junior Championships	16th
JGP Estonia	10th
Bavarian Open	1st
Master's de Patinage	1st

== Detailed results ==
=== Pair skating with Pavel Kovalev ===
ISU personal best scores in the +5/-5 GOE System
Segment	Type	Score	Event
Total	TSS	179.85	2022 Grand Prix de France
Short program	TSS	64.65	2026 Winter Olympics
Short program	TES	36.67	2022 Grand Prix de France
Short program	PCS	29.21	2023 World Team Trophy
Free skating	TSS	115.87	2022 Grand Prix de France
Free skating	TES	58.71	2026 Winter Olympics
Free skating	PCS	59.86	2022 Grand Prix de France

ISU personal best scores in the +3/-3 GOE System
Segment	Type	Score	Event
Total	TSS	141.87	2016 CS Tallinn Trophy
Short program	TSS	51.76	2017 CS Tallinn Trophy
Short program	TES	29.44	2017 CS Tallinn Trophy
Short program	PCS	22.32	2017 CS Tallinn Trophy
Free skating	TSS	91.11	2016 CS Tallinn Trophy
Free skating	TES	46.35	2016 CS Tallinn Trophy
Free skating	PCS	45.76	2016 CS Tallinn Trophy

Results in the 2014-15 season
Date	Event	SP		FS		Total	
Date	Event	P	Score	P	Score	P	Score
Oct 2-4, 2014	(France) 2014 Master's de Patinage	3	38.66	—N/a	—N/a	WD	—N/a
Nov 26-30, 2014	(Germany) 2014 NRW Trophy	4	34.15	3	66.11	4	100.26
Feb 11-15, 2015	(Germany) 2015 Bavarian Open	4	37.60	4	74.36	4	111.96

Results in the 2015-16 season
Date	Event	SP		FS		Total	
Date	Event	P	Score	P	Score	P	Score
Sep 17-20, 2015	(Italy) 2015 Lombardia Trophy	3	41.72	3	70.62	3	112.34
Oct 8-10, 2015	(France) 2015 Master's de Patinage	3	34.81	2	76.07	2	110.88
Oct 15-18, 2015	(France) 2015 Cup of Nice	3	46.42	3	80.58	3	127.00
Dec 17-19, 2015	(France) 2016 French Championships	2	41.59	2	74.03	2	115.62
Feb 17-21 2016	(Germany) 2016 Bavarian Open	6	40.04	2	90.28	4	130.32

Results in the 2016-17 season
Date	Event	SP		FS		Total	
Date	Event	P	Score	P	Score	P	Score
Oct 6–8, 2016	(France) 2016 Master's de Patinage	1	39.27	1	81.03	1	120.31
Oct 14–16, 2016	(France) 2016 Cup of Nice	6	39.96	6	75.03	6	114.99
Nov 20–27, 2016	(Estonia) 2016 CS Tallinn Trophy	4	50.76	4	91.11	4	141.87
Dec 15–17, 2016	(France) 2017 French Championships	3	50.92	3	85.03	3	135.95

Results in the 2017-18 season
Date	Event	SP		FS		Total	
Date	Event	P	Score	P	Score	P	Score
Sep 28-30, 2017	(France) 2017 Master's de Patinage	3	40.60	3	80.29	3	124.69
Oct 11-15, 2017	(France) 2017 Cup of Nice	7	48.78	8	77.11	8	125.89
Nov 26 – Dec 2, 2018	(Estonia) 2018 CS Tallinn Trophy	5	51.76	6	78.64	5	130.50

Results in the 2018-19 season
Date	Event	SP		FS		Total	
Date	Event	P	Score	P	Score	P	Score
Sep 25–27, 2018	(France) 2018 Master's de Patinage	2	50.82	2	81.26	2	132.08
Nov 6-11, 2018	(Latvia) 2018 Volvo Open	2	44.97	1	91.11	2	136.08
Dec 13–15, 2018	(France) 2019 French Championships	3	47.25	3	82.15	3	129.40

Results in the 2019-20 season
Date	Event	SP		FS		Total	
Date	Event	P	Score	P	Score	P	Score
Sep 26–28, 2019	(France) 2019 Master's de Patinage	1	52.21	1	75.64	1	127.85
Nov 14–17, 2019	(Poland) 2019 CS Warsaw Cup	13	47.70	13	87.74	13	135.44
Dec 4–7, 2019	(Croatia) 2019 CS Golden Spin of Zagreb	18	41.66	14	89.37	17	131.03
Dec 19–21, 2019	(France) 2020 French Championships	2	52.97	1	102.33	2	155.30

Results in the 2020-21 season
Date	Event	SP		FS		Total	
Date	Event	P	Score	P	Score	P	Score
Oct 1–3, 2020	(France) 2020 Master's de Patinage	3	48.12	3	84.03	3	132.15

Results in the 2021-22 season
Date	Event	SP		FS		Total	
Date	Event	P	Score	P	Score	P	Score
Sep 10–12, 2021	(Italy) 2021 CS Lombardia Trophy	8	43.72	5	95.75	7	139.47
Nov 19–21, 2021	2021 Internationaux de France	6	55.25	8	96.73	7	151.98
Dec 16–18, 2021	(France) 2022 French Championships	1	54.67	1	102.82	1	157.49
Jan 10–16, 2022	(Estonia) 2022 European Championships	12	56.04	14	100.51	14	156.55
Mar 21–27, 2022	(France) 2022 World Championships	9	50.95	8	102.78	8	153.73

Results in the 2022-23 season
Date	Event	SP		FS		Total	
Date	Event	P	Score	P	Score	P	Score
Sep 21–24, 2022	(Germany) 2022 CS Nebelhorn Trophy	6	54.56	6	102.80	6	157.36
Oct 6–8, 2022	(France) 2022 Master's de Patinage	1	61.27	2	104.94	1	166.21
Nov 4–6, 2022	2022 Grand Prix de France	2	63.98	3	115.87	2	179.85
Nov 18–20, 2022	(Japan) 2022 NHK Trophy	5	55.36	4	106.65	5	162.01
Dec 15–17, 2022	(France) 2023 French Championships	1	60.27	1	118.04	1	178.31
Jan 25–29, 2023	(Finland) 2023 European Championships	4	62.46	6	107.48	6	169.94
Mar 22–26, 2023	(Japan) 2023 World Championships	13	61.07	14	111.12	14	172.29
Apr 13–16, 2023	(Japan) 2023 World Team Trophy	5	53.60	5	114.78	5 (5)	178.38

Results in the 2023-24 season
Date	Event	SP		FS		Total	
Date	Event	P	Score	P	Score	P	Score
Sep 6-9, 2023	(United States) 2022 John Nicks Pairs Challenge	2	54.74	1	110.24	1	164.98
Sep 14–16, 2023	(Canada) 2023 CS Autumn Classic International	9	47.87	8	98.76	9	146.63
Sep 28–30, 2023	(France) 2023 Master's de Patinage	2	50.53	1	122.64	1	173.17
Oct 4–8, 2023	(Finland) 2023 CS Finlandia Trophy	5	50.53	5	102.31	5	158.14
Nov 3–5, 2023	2023 Grand Prix de France	3	59.04	3	113.84	3	172.88
Nov 17–19, 2023	(Finland) 2023 Grand Prix of Espoo	7	55.45	5	97.09	5	152.54
Dec 11–14, 2023	(France) 2024 French Championships	1	60.07	1	117.81	1	177.88
Jan 10–14, 2024	(Lithuania) 2024 European Championships	15	50.90	—N/a	—N/a	WD	—N/a
Feb 22–25, 2024	(Netherlands) 2024 International Challenge Cup	5	52.95	3	112.70	3	165.65

Results in the 2024–25 season
Date	Event	SP		FS		Total	
Date	Event	P	Score	P	Score	P	Score
Sep 26–28, 2024	(France) 2024 Master's de Patinage	2	42.75	2	94.88	2	137.63
Oct 12–13, 2024	(United Kingdom) 2024 Tayside Trophy	3	52.72	6	92.61	6	145.33
Nov 1–3, 2024	2024 Grand Prix de France	7	54.81	6	102.23	7	157.04
Nov 22–24, 2024	2024 Cup of China	6	54.01	6	103.10	6	157.11
Dec 4–7, 2024	(Croatia) 2024 CS Golden Spin of Zagreb	5	54.52	5	103.93	6	158.45
Dec 20–21, 2024	(France) 2025 French Championships	1	65.93	1	112.82	1	178.75
Jan 28 – Feb 2, 2025	(Estonia) 2025 European Championships	8	57.13	9	110.50	9	167.63
Feb 18–20, 2025	(Italy) Road to 26 Trophy	8	48.68	4	106.17	4	154.85
Mar 25–30, 2025	(United States) 2025 World Championships	21	54.07	—N/a	—N/a	21	54.07
Apr 17–20, 2025	(Japan) 2025 World Team Trophy	6	54.74	6	107.45	4 (6)	162.19

Results in the 2025–26 season
Date	Event	SP		FS		Total	
Date	Event	P	Score	P	Score	P	Score
Aug 28–30, 2025	(France) 2025 Master's de Patinage	1	65.41	1	112.93	1	178.34
Sep 18–21, 2025	(China) 2025 Skate to Milano	2	64.28	5	107.30	4	171.58
Oct 17–19, 2025	2025 Grand Prix de France	6	59.00	6	101.62	6	160.62
Dec 18–20, 2025	(France) 2026 French Championships	1	63.79	1	113.27	1	177.06
Jan 13–18, 2026	(United Kingdom) 2026 European Championships	8	58.25	10	106.84	10	165.09
Feb 6–8, 2026	(Italy) 2026 Winter Olympics – Team event	7	63.72	—N/a	—N/a	6	—N/a
Feb 6–19, 2026	(Italy) 2026 Winter Olympics	16	64.65	15	113.78	16	178.43
Mar 24–29, 2026	(Czech Republic) 2026 World Championships	15	62.17	17	108.03	17	169.20

Results in the 2026–27 season
Date	Event	SP		FS		Total	
Date	Event	P	Score	P	Score	P	Score
Aug 27-29, 2026	(France) 2026 Master's de Patinage	2	60.39	1	103.26	1	163.65
Sep 4-6, 2026	(Japan) 2026 CS Kinoshita Group Cup	6	51.74	5	99.95	6	151.69
Oct 23-25, 2026	2026 Grand Prix de France	4	62.40	7	99.22	5	161.62
