= Laurent Depouilly =

French figure skater (born 1963)

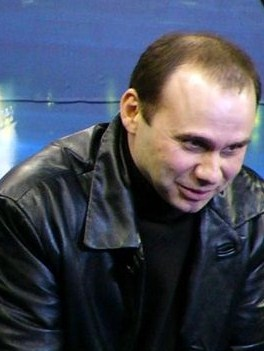

Personal information
- Full name: Laurent Depouilly
- Born: 26 October 1963 (age 62) Asnières-sur-Seine
- Height: 1.68 m (5 ft 6 in)

Figure skating career
- Country: France
- Skating club: Club de Glace Audonien

Laurent Depouilly (French pronunciation: [lɔʁɑ̃ dəpuji]; born 26 October 1963 in Asnières-sur-Seine) is a French figure skater. He is the 1986 French national champion. He represented France at the 1984 Winter Olympics, where he placed 15th. He is married to Nathalie Depouilly and their daughter Chloe Depouilly is a competitive skater.

Following his retirement from competitive skating, he became a coach at Club Olympique de Courbevoie in Courbevoie, France. Among his current and former students are Brian Joubert, Vinciane Fortin, Adam Siao Him Fa, Camille Kovalev / Pavel Kovalev, Océane Piegad / Denys Strekalin, Ivan Shmuratko, and his daughter Chloe.

== Competitive highlights ==
International
Event	1982–83	1983–84	1984–85	1985–86
Winter Olympics		15th		
World Championships	11th			15th
European Championships	9th	11th		8th
Nebelhorn Trophy				3rd
National
French Championships	2nd	2nd	3rd	1st
