= 2025 ISU World Team Trophy in Figure Skating =

Figure skating competition

2025 World Team Trophy
- Type: ISU Event
- Date: April 17 – 20
- Season: 2024–25
- Location: Tokyo, Japan
- Host: Japan Skating Federation
- Venue: Tokyo Metropolitan Gymnasium
- Previous: 2023 ISU World Team Trophy
- Next: 2027 ISU World Team Trophy

The 2025 ISU World Team Trophy was an international figure skating competition held from April 17 to 20, 2025 in Tokyo, Japan. The top six International Skating Union members were invited to compete in a team format with points awarded based on skaters' placement. Participating countries selected two men's single skaters, two women' single skaters, one pair, and one ice dance entry for their team.

== Scoring ==
Skaters competed in both the short program/rhythm dance and the free skating/free dance segments for their team. Each segment was scored separately. The points earned per placement are as follows:

Placement	Points (Singles)	Points (Pairs/Dance)
1st	12	
2nd	11	
3rd	10	
4th	9	
5th	8	
6th	7	
7th	6	—N/a
8th	5	—N/a
9th	4	—N/a
10th	3	—N/a
11th	2	—N/a
12th	1	—N/a

Tie-breaking within a segment:

1. If two or more skaters, pairs, or ice dance couples have the same rank in the short program or rhythm dance, then the total technical score will be used to break ties.
2. If two or more skaters, pairs, or ice dance couples have the same rank in the free skating or free dance, then the total components score will be used to break ties.

If these results do not break the tie, the competitors concerned will be considered tied. The team points will be awarded according to the placement of the skaters/couples in each discipline.

Tie-breaking within team standings:

1. The highest total team points from the two best places in different disciplines of the current phase will break the ties.
2. If they remain tied, the highest total segment scores of the two best places according to the team points in different disciplines of the current phase will break the ties.
3. If they remain tied, the highest total team points from the three best places in different disciplines of the current phase will break the ties.
4. If they remain tied, the highest total segment scores of the three best places according to the team points in different disciplines of the current phase will break the ties.

If these criteria fail to break the ties, the teams will be considered as tied.

== Qualification ==
Note: As of March 30, 2025, the point totals were announced for the top seven countries without providing a full breakdown for each discipline.

Rank	Team	(Junior) Grand Prix and Final						ISU Championships						Total
Rank	Team	Men		Women		Pairs	Ice dance	Men		Women		Pairs	Ice dance	Total
1	United States	800	324	800	324	525	800	1200	547	1200	875	709	1200	9331
2	Japan	720	648	720	648	720	148	972	709	1080	972	1200	402	8939
3	Italy	583	262	324	182	583	720	465	339	551	339	972	875	6195
4	France	472	400	236	225	236	472	875	787	293	275	362	574	5207
5	Canada	213	164	262	191	400	583	305	264	418	325	787	1080	4992
6	Georgia	292		191	164	648	292	517		756	295	875	465	4495

- For a team to be qualified it must obtain points in at least three of the four disciplines. This chart only include top twelve teams able to do so.
- Although a qualified team can participate with two single skaters each women and men, one pair and one ice dance couple, teams earned their spots based on a point-scoring system using ISU World Standing points accumulated by their top two Women’s and Men’s singles skaters, top Pair team, and top Ice Dance couple. The primary events considered include:
  - ISU Grand Prix of Figure Skating events & Final (2024/25 season)
  - ISU World Figure Skating Championships 2025
  - ISU European Figure Skating Championships / ISU Four Continents Figure Skating Championships 2025
  - ISU World Junior Figure Skating Championships 2025
  - ISU Junior Grand Prix of Figure Skating (2024/25 season)

== Entries ==
Names with an asterisk (*) denote the team captain.

Teams began announcing their entries after the 2025 World Championships.

Entries
Country	Men	Women	Pairs	Ice dance
Canada	Aleksa Rakic	Sara-Maude Dupuis	Deanna Stellato-Dudek; Maxime Deschamps	Piper Gilles*; Paul Poirier
Canada	Roman Sadovsky	Madeline Schizas	Deanna Stellato-Dudek; Maxime Deschamps	Piper Gilles*; Paul Poirier
France	Kévin Aymoz*	Lorine Schild	Camille Kovalev; Pavel Kovalev	Evgenia Lopareva; Geoffrey Brissaud
France	Adam Siao Him Fa	Léa Serna	Camille Kovalev; Pavel Kovalev	Evgenia Lopareva; Geoffrey Brissaud
Georgia	Nika Egadze*	Anastasiia Gubanova	Anastasiia Metelkina; Luka Berulava	Diana Davis; Gleb Smolkin
Georgia	Morisi Kvitelashvili	Alina Urushadze	Anastasiia Metelkina; Luka Berulava	Diana Davis; Gleb Smolkin
Italy	Daniel Grassl	Lara Naki Gutmann	Sara Conti; Niccolò Macii	Charlène Guignard*; Marco Fabbri
Italy	Nikolaj Memola	Anna Pezzetta	Sara Conti; Niccolò Macii	Charlène Guignard*; Marco Fabbri
Japan	Yuma Kagiyama	Mone Chiba	Riku Miura; Ryuichi Kihara	Utana Yoshida; Masaya Morita
Japan	Shun Sato	Kaori Sakamoto*	Riku Miura; Ryuichi Kihara	Utana Yoshida; Masaya Morita
United States	Jason Brown*	Amber Glenn	Alisa Efimova; Misha Mitrofanov	Madison Chock; Evan Bates
United States	Ilia Malinin	Alysa Liu	Alisa Efimova; Misha Mitrofanov	Madison Chock; Evan Bates

== Medalists ==
Gold	Silver	Bronze
United States; Jason Brown; Ilia Malinin; Amber Glenn; Alysa Liu; Alisa Efimova; Misha Mitrofanov; Madison Chock; Evan Bates	Japan; Yuma Kagiyama; Shun Sato; Mone Chiba; Kaori Sakamoto; Riku Miura; Ryuichi Kihara; Utana Yoshida; Masaya Morita	Italy; Daniel Grassl; Nikolaj Memola; Lara Naki Gutmann; Anna Pezzetta; Sara Conti; Niccolò Macii; Charlène Guignard; Marco Fabbri

== Results ==
=== Team standings ===
Team results
Rank	Team	Men		Women		Pairs		Ice dance		Total points
Rank	Team	SP	FS	SP	FS	SP	FS	RD	FD	Total points
1st place, gold medalist(s)	United States	12	12	12	12	8	8	12	12	126
1st place, gold medalist(s)	United States	10	11	6	11	8	8	12	12	126
2nd place, silver medalist(s)	Japan	9	9	11	10	12	12	7	7	110
2nd place, silver medalist(s)	Japan	8	8	9	8	12	12	7	7	110
3rd place, bronze medalist(s)	Italy	6	10	8	7	11	11	10	10	86
3rd place, bronze medalist(s)	Italy	2	5	4	2	11	11	10	10	86
4	France	11	7	5	5	7	7	9	8	78
4	France	7	6	2	4	7	7	9	8	78
5	Canada	4	4	7	6	9	9	11	11	72
5	Canada	3	2	3	3	9	9	11	11	72
6	Georgia	5	3	10	9	10	10	8	9	68
6	Georgia	1	1	1	1	10	10	8	9	68

=== Men's singles ===
Rank	Skater	Nation	Total	SP		Team points	FS		Team points
1	Ilia Malinin	United States	289.96	1	106.08	12	1	183.88	12
2	Jason Brown	United States	273.15	3	93.82	10	2	179.33	11
3	Adam Siao Him Fa	France	264.63	2	96.16	11	6	168.47	7
4	Shun Sato	Japan	263.30	5	93.68	8	4	169.62	9
5	Yuma Kagiyama	Japan	262.66	4	93.73	9	5	168.93	8
6	Daniel Grassl	Italy	259.52	7	87.07	6	3	172.45	10
7	Kévin Aymoz	France	253.41	6	88.07	7	7	165.34	6
8	Roman Sadovsky	Canada	238.09	9	84.75	4	9	153.34	4
9	Nika Egadze	Georgia	232.59	8	84.76	5	10	147.83	3
10	Nikolaj Memola	Italy	227.37	11	69.20	2	8	158.17	5
11	Aleksa Rakic	Canada	203.46	10	72.86	3	11	130.60	2
12	Morisi Kvitelashvili	Georgia	179.81	12	59.54	1	12	120.27	1

=== Women's singles ===
Rank	Skater	Nation	Total	SP		Team points	FS		Team points
1	Alysa Liu	United States	226.67	1	75.70	12	1	150.97	12
2	Kaori Sakamoto	Japan	220.54	2	75.54	11	3	145.00	10
3	Amber Glenn	United States	212.63	7	63.70	6	2	148.93	11
4	Anastasiia Gubanova	Georgia	211.19	3	69.80	10	4	141.39	9
5	Mone Chiba	Japan	208.18	4	69.66	9	5	138.52	8
6	Lara Naki Gutmann	Italy	201.56	5	68.43	8	6	133.13	7
7	Madeline Schizas	Canada	188.50	6	63.93	7	7	124.57	6
8	Lorine Schild	France	181.44	8	63.66	5	8	117.78	5
9	Léa Serna	France	164.33	11	57.68	2	9	106.65	4
10	Sara-Maude Dupuis	Canada	160.95	10	61.88	3	10	99.07	3
11	Anna Pezzetta	Italy	160.66	9	62.25	4	11	98.41	2
12	Alina Urushadze	Georgia	128.96	12	38.77	1	12	90.19	1

=== Pairs ===
Rank	Team	Nation	Total	SP		Team points	FS		Team points
1	Riku Miura; Ryuichi Kihara	Japan	226.05	1	80.99	12	1	145.06	12
2	Sara Conti; Niccolò Macii	Italy	216.36	2	74.10	11	2	142.26	11
3	Anastasiia Metelkina; Luka Berulava	Georgia	213.63	3	73.67	10	3	139.96	10
4	Deanna Stellato-Dudek; Maxime Deschamps	Canada	201.00	4	66.65	9	4	134.35	9
5	Alisa Efimova; Misha Mitrofanov	United States	182.24	5	64.57	8	5	117.67	8
6	Camille Kovalev; Pavel Kovalev	France	162.19	6	54.74	7	6	107.45	7

=== Ice dance ===
Rank	Team	Nation	Total	RD		Team points	FD		Team points
1	Madison Chock; Evan Bates	United States	224.76	1	91.25	12	1	133.51	12
2	Piper Gilles; Paul Poirier	Canada	219.06	2	87.15	11	2	131.91	11
3	Charlène Guignard; Marco Fabbri	Italy	206.40	3	84.58	10	3	121.82	10
4	Evgeniia Lopareva; Geoffrey Brissaud	France	198.22	4	81.78	9	5	116.44	8
5	Diana Davis; Gleb Smolkin	Georgia	194.91	5	76.47	8	4	118.44	9
6	Utana Yoshida; Masaya Morita	Japan	151.58	6	56.63	7	6	94.95	7
