= 2016 CS Tallinn Trophy =

International figure skating competition held in Tallinn

- Type: ISU Challenger Series
- Date: 20 – 27 November 2016
- Season: 2016–17
- Location: Tallinn, Estonia
- Host: Estonian Skating Union
- Venue: Tondiraba Ice Hall

Champions
- Men's singles: (Russia) Roman Savosin
- Ladies' singles: (Russia) Stanislava Konstantinova
- Pairs: (Russia) Alina Ustimkina / Nikita Volodin
- Ice dance: (Russia) Elena Ilinykh / Ruslan Zhiganshin
- Previous: 2016 CS Warsaw Cup
- Next: 2016 CS Golden Spin of Zagreb

The 2016 CS Tallinn Trophy was a senior international figure skating competition, held in November 2016 at the Tondiraba Ice Hall in Tallinn, Estonia. Its senior categories were part of the 2016–17 ISU Challenger Series. Medals were awarded in the disciplines of men's singles, ladies' singles, pair skating, and ice dancing.

== Entries ==
Country	Men	Ladies	Pairs	Ice dance
Armenia	Slavik Hayrapetyan			
Austria		Kerstin Frank		
Azerbaijan	Larry Loupolover			Anastasia Galyeta / Avidan Brown; Varvara Ogloblina / Mikhail Zhirnov
Belarus	Yakau Zenko	Alina Suponenko		Viktoria Kavaliova / Yurii Bieliaiev
Czech Republic		Elizaveta Ukolova		
Estonia	Samuel Koppel; Daniel-Albert Naurits; Aleksandr Selevko	Johanna Allik; Helery Hälvin; Elizaveta Leonova; Gerli Liinamäe; Kristina Škuleta-Gromova		Katerina Bunina / German Frolov; Marina Elias / Geido Kapp
Finland	Valtter Virtanen	Viveca Lindfors; Karoliina Luhtonen		Olesia Karmi / Max Lindholm; Juulia Turkkila / Matthias Versluis; Cecilia Törn / Jussiville Partanen
France	Simon Hocquaux; Adrien Tesson		Camille Mendoza / Pavel Kovalev	Adelina Galyavieva / Laurent Abecassis; Mathilde Harold / Mael Demougeot
Germany		Lutricia Bock; Maria Herceg		
Great Britain				Robynne Tweedale / Joseph Buckland
Hong Kong	Kwun Hung Leung			
Hungary	Alexander Maszljanko	Julia Batori; Ivett Tóth		
Israel			Arina Cherniavskaia / Evgeni Krasnopolski	Adel Tankova / Ronald Zilberberg; Isabella Tobias / Ilia Tkachenko
Italy	Maurizio Zandron			
Kazakhstan	Abzal Rakimgaliev			
Latvia		Angelīna Kučvaļska		Aurelia Ippolito / Malcolm Jones; Olga Jakushina / Andrei Nevskiy
Lithuania		Aleksandra Golovkina; Inga Janulevičiūtė; Viltė Radzvilavičiūtė	Goda Butkutė / Nikita Ermolaev	Taylor Tran / Saulius Ambrulevičius
Norway		Juni Marie Benjaminsen		
Poland		Elżbieta Gabryszak		
Russia	Roman Savosin; Anton Shulepov; Pavel Vyugov	Stanislava Konstantinova; Natalia Ogoreltseva; Serafima Sakhanovich	Alisa Efimova / Alexander Korovin; Alina Ustimkina / Nikita Volodin	Olga Bibihina / Daniil Zvorykin; Elena Ilinykh / Ruslan Zhiganshin; Ludmila Sosnitskaya / Pavel Golovishnikov
South Korea		Choi Yu-jin		Yura Min / Alexander Gamelin
Switzerland	Lukas Britschgi			Victoria Manni / Carlo Röthlisberger
Turkey				Alisa Agafonova / Alper Uçar
United States	Andrew Torgashev	Mariah Bell; Bradie Tennell		Elliana Pogrebinsky / Alex Benoit

Withdrew before starting orders drawn

- Men: Jiří Bělohradský (CZE), Glebs Basins (LAT)
- Ladies: Diana Reinsalu (EST), Fruzsina Medgyesi (HUN), Byun Ji-hyun (KOR), Fleur Maxwell (LUX), Isabelle Olsson (SWE)
- Pairs: Çağla Demirsal / Berk Akalın (TUR), Marissa Castelli / Mervin Tran (USA)
- Ice dance: Varvara Ogloblina / Mikhail Zhirnov (AZE), Mina Zdravkova / Christopher M. Davis (BUL), Kristsina Kaunatskaia / Yuri Hulitski (BLR), Ekaterina Fedyushchenko / Lucas Kitteridge (GBR)

Added

- Pairs: Alina Ustimkina / Nikita Volodin (RUS)

== Results: Challenger Series ==
=== Men ===
Rank	Name	Nation	Total	SP		FS	
1	Roman Savosin	Russia	218.06	2	71.39	1	146.67
2	Anton Shulepov	Russia	209.04	1	75.66	3	133.38
3	Andrew Torgashev	United States	201.45	4	68.12	4	133.33
4	Pavel Vyugov	Russia	200.75	3	70.27	5	130.48
5	Maurizio Zandron	Italy	198.12	8	62.90	2	135.22
6	Adrien Tesson	France	189.32	5	66.31	6	123.01
7	Abzal Rakimgaliev	Kazakhstan	185.64	6	64.27	8	121.37
8	Samuel Koppel	Estonia	185.19	9	62.72	7	122.47
9	Larry Loupolover	Azerbaijan	180.22	7	63.55	11	116.67
10	Valtter Virtanen	Finland	173.36	10	58.22	12	115.14
11	Simon Hocquaux	France	172.81	12	54.65	10	118.16
12	Slavik Hayrapetyan	Armenia	169.53	11	57.43	14	112.10
13	Lukas Britschgi	Switzerland	165.08	16	45.09	9	119.99
14	Daniel-Albert Naurits	Estonia	163.17	13	50.91	13	112.26
15	Kwun Hung Leung	Hong Kong	126.47	15	45.82	15	80.65
WD	Yakau Zenko	Belarus		14	49.52		
WD	Alexander Maszljanko	Hungary		17	43.71		
WD	Aleksandr Selevko	Estonia					

=== Ladies ===
Rank	Name	Nation	Total	SP		FS	
1	Stanislava Konstantinova	Russia	186.97	1	63.85	1	123.12
2	Serafima Sakhanovich	Russia	177.35	2	60.78	2	116.57
3	Bradie Tennell	United States	168.98	8	54.44	3	114.54
4	Mariah Bell	United States	167.69	6	55.92	4	111.77
5	Natalia Ogoreltseva	Russia	162.99	3	59.93	6	103.06
6	Ivett Tóth	Hungary	162.96	4	56.64	5	106.32
7	Angelīna Kučvaļska	Latvia	156.82	5	56.35	8	100.47
8	Lutricia Bock	Germany	153.19	12	50.34	7	102.85
9	Kerstin Frank	Austria	151.98	10	52.35	10	99.63
10	Viveca Lindfors	Finland	151.37	7	55.61	11	95.76
11	Choi Yu-jin	South Korea	150.31	11	50.51	9	99.80
12	Helery Hälvin	Estonia	144.90	9	53.36	12	91.54
13	Maria Herceg	Germany	131.65	13	50.04	16	81.61
14	Gerli Liinamäe	Estonia	129.47	15	46.62	14	82.85
15	Elizaveta Ukolova	Czech Republic	128.98	14	48.89	17	80.09
16	Kristina Škuleta-Gromova	Estonia	126.24	16	44.18	15	82.06
17	Johanna Allik	Estonia	121.85	19	38.49	13	83.36
18	Julia Batori	Hungary	105.39	17	41.45	20	63.94
19	Inga Janulevičiūtė	Lithuania	104.23	20	37.16	19	67.07
20	Karoliina Luhtonen	Finland	102.49	23	34.47	18	68.02
21	Elżbieta Gabryszak	Poland	97.32	18	40.23	24	57.09
22	Elizaveta Leonova	Estonia	96.53	22	36.01	22	60.52
23	Juni Marie Benjaminsen	Norway	95.63	21	37.00	23	58.63
24	Alina Suponenko	Belarus	94.74	24	32.31	21	62.43
25	Viltė Radzvilavičiūtė	Lithuania	80.24	25	26.45	25	53.79

=== Pairs ===
Rank	Name	Nation	Total	SP		FS	
1	Alina Ustimkina / Nikita Volodin	Russia	167.78	1	65.64	2	102.14
2	Alisa Efimova / Alexander Korovin	Russia	160.68	2	57.62	1	103.06
3	Goda Butkutė / Nikita Ermolaev	Lithuania	149.30	3	54.06	3	95.24
4	Camille Mendoza / Pavel Kovalev	France	141.87	4	50.76	4	91.11
5	Arina Cherniavskaia / Evgeni Krasnopolski	Israel	131.22	5	44.98	5	86.24

=== Ice dancing ===
Rank	Name	Nation	Total	SD		FD	
1	Elena Ilinykh / Ruslan Zhiganshin	Russia	185.19	1	76.04	1	109.15
2	Isabella Tobias / Ilia Tkachenko	Israel	177.80	2	71.35	2	106.45
3	Elliana Pogrebinsky / Alex Benoit	United States	167.81	4	65.94	3	101.87
4	Alisa Agafonova / Alper Uçar	Turkey	163.00	3	67.51	4	95.49
5	Yura Min / Alexander Gamelin	South Korea	151.35	6	59.22	5	92.13
6	Olga Jakushina / Andrei Nevskiy	Latvia	150.81	5	60.51	6	90.30
7	Adelina Galyavieva / Laurent Abecassis	France	144.25	7	56.43	8	87.82
8	Taylor Tran / Saulius Ambrulevičius	Lithuania	143.30	9	54.90	7	88.40
9	Cecilia Törn / Jussiville Partanen	Finland	141.90	8	55.70	10	86.20
10	Anastasia Galyeta / Avidan Brown	Azerbaijan	141.12	10	54.53	9	86.59
11	Ludmila Sosnitskaya / Pavel Golovishnikov	Russia	138.65	12	53.61	11	85.04
12	Viktoria Kavaliova / Yurii Bieliaiev	Belarus	131.14	11	53.98	13	77.16
13	Juulia Turkkila / Matthias Versluis	Finland	128.39	14	50.55	12	77.84
14	Victoria Manni / Carlo Röthlisberger	Switzerland	125.34	13	52.32	15	73.02
15	Robynne Tweedale / Joseph Buckland	Great Britain	125.21	15	49.81	14	75.40
16	Olga Bibihina / Daniil Zvorykin	Russia	118.58	17	47.63	16	70.95
17	Katerina Bunina / German Frolov	Estonia	116.27	18	45.35	17	70.92
18	Adel Tankova / Ronald Zilberberg	Israel	111.31	16	48.37	19	62.94
19	Mathilde Harold / Mael Demougeot	France	106.84	21	39.75	18	67.09
20	Aurelia Ippolito / Malcolm Jones	Latvia	102.83	19	40.68	20	62.15
21	Marina Elias / Geido Kapp	Estonia	97.03	20	39.83	21	57.20

== Results: Junior and advanced novice ==
=== Medal summary: Junior ===
Discipline	Gold	Silver	Bronze
Men	(Czech Republic) Matyáš Bělohradský	(Germany) Thomas Stoll	(Russia) Nikita Starostin
Ladies	(Russia) Alisa Fedichkina	(Russia) Elizaveta Nugumanova	(Czech Republic) Dahyun Ko
Pairs	(Russia) Daria Kvartalova / Alexey Sviatchenko	(Israel) Hailey Kops / Artem Tsoglin	
Ice dancing	(Russia) Anastasia Skoptsova / Kirill Aleshin	(Russia) Ksenia Konkina / Grigorii Yakushev	(Russia) Polina Ivanenko / Danil Karpov

=== Medal summary: Advanced novice ===
Discipline	Gold	Silver	Bronze
Men	(China) Chen Yudong	(China) Fang Shuai	(Sweden) Andreas Nordebäck
Ladies	(Russia) Alena Kanysheva	(South Korea) You Young	(Russia) Anna Kuzmenko
Ice dancing	(Russia) Julia Alieva / Mikhail Kaigorodtsev	(Russia) Sofiia Aleksova / Maksemilian Dubov	(Russia) Aleksandra Samersova / Fedor Sharonov
