= Masaya Morita =

Japanese ice dancer (born 2003)

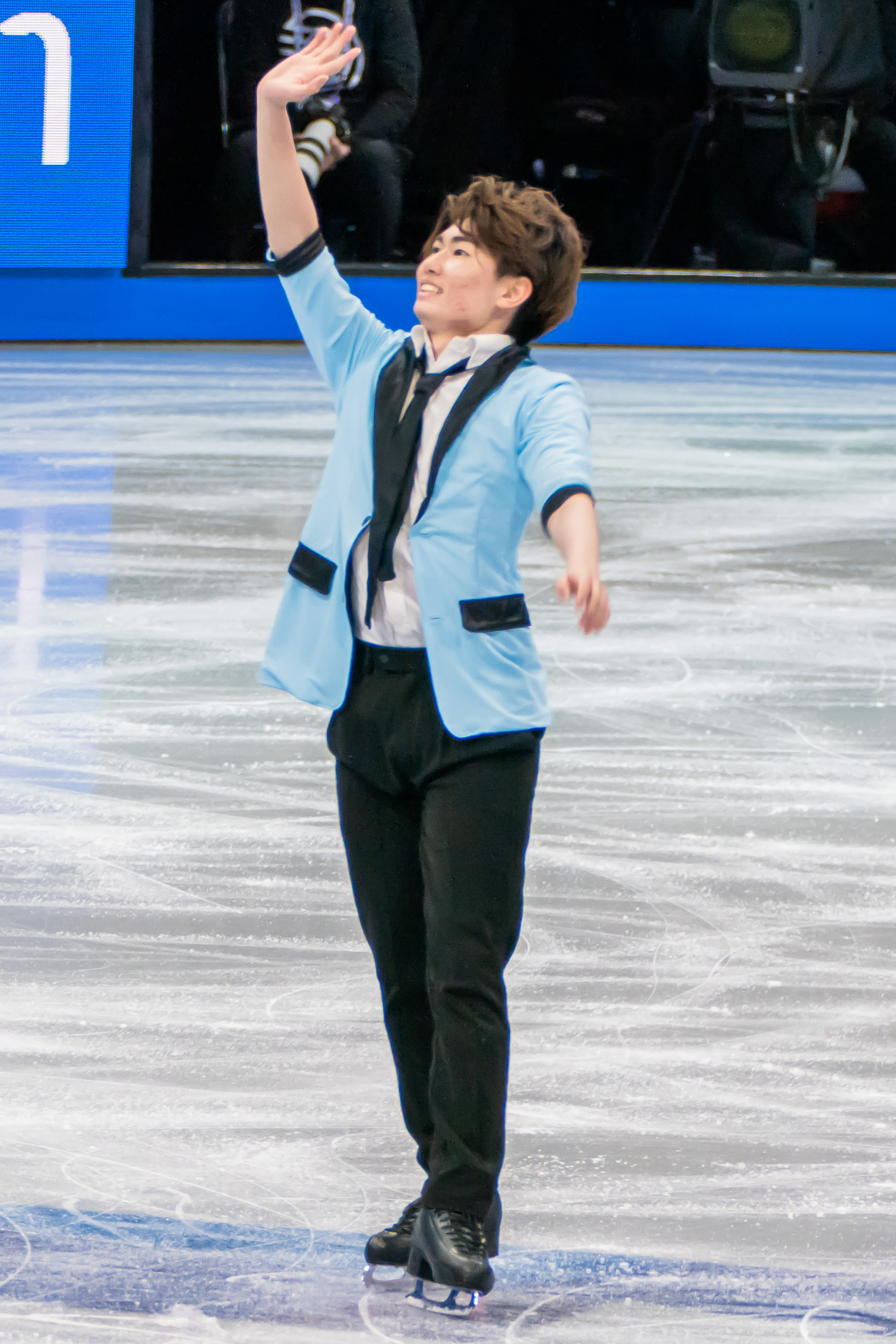
- Morita at the 2025 World Championships

Personal information
- Native name: 森田 真沙也
- Born: November 16, 2003 (age 22) Kyoto, Japan
- Height: 1.65 m (5 ft 5 in)

Figure skating career
- Country: Japan
- Discipline: Ice dance
- Partner: Utana Yoshida (since 2023); Nao Kida (2020–2023); Nagomi Okada (2017–2019)
- Coach: Cathy Reed; Scott Moir; Madison Hubbell; Adrián Díaz
- Skating club: Kinoshita Academy
- Began skating: 2013

Medal record
Olympic Games
Silver medal – second place	2026 Milano Cortina	Team
Japan Championships
Gold medal – first place	2024–25 Osaka	Ice dance
Gold medal – first place	2025–26 Tokyo	Ice dance
Bronze medal – third place	2023–24 Nagano	Ice dance
World Team Trophy
Silver medal – second place	2025 Tokyo	Team

Masaya Morita (森田 真沙也, Morita Masaya; born November 16, 2003) is a Japanese ice dancer who currently competes with Utana Yoshida. Together, they are 2026 Olympic team event silver medalists, the 2025 Asian Winter Games champions, and two-time Japanese national champions (2024–25, 2025–26).

With his former partner, Nao Kida, he is a two-time Japan junior national champion (2021–22, 2022–23) and the 2022 JGP Czech Republic bronze medalist. They also competed at two World Junior Championships (2022, 2023).

== Personal life ==
Morita was born on November 16, 2003. In 2021, after graduating from Kyoto Ryōyō High School, he would enroll at Doshisha University's Faculty of Commerce.

He admires Japanese singles skater Kazuki Tomono and Canadian ice dance team Gilles/Poirier.

== Career ==
=== Early career ===
Morita began figure skating in 2013. He originally competed as a singles skater and trained at the Kyoto Daigo Figure Skating Club, where he was coached by Hikako Watanabe. At the age of thirteen, Morita would make the decision to switch to the ice dance discipline due to his struggles with mastering jumps. Prior to the 2017–18 figure skating season, Morita would team up with Nagomi Okada. Together, they won silver on the novice level at the 2017–18 and the 2018–19 Japan Championships. The team parted ways in 2019 and Morita briefly returned to singles skating for the 2019–20 figure skating season.

=== Ice dance with Nao Kida ===
==== 2020–2021 season: Debut of Kida/Morita ====
Prior to the season, Morita moved his training base to Kyoto's newly established Kinoshita Academy. There, former Japanese ice dancer Cathy Reed became his new coach. Subsequently, Morita teamed up with former singles skater Nao Kida.

Kida/Morita debuted as a team at the 2020–21 Japan Novice Championships, where they won the gold medal.

==== 2021–2022 season: Junior international debut ====
Kida/Morita began the season in November by competing 2021–22 Japan Junior Championships, winning the gold medal. They would go on to make their international debut at the 2022 Bavarian Open, where they placed ninth on the junior level.

Selected to compete at the 2022 World Junior Championships in Tallinn, Estonia, the team finished in twelfth place.

==== 2022–2023 season: Junior Grand Prix bronze ====
Kida/Morita started the season by competing on the 2022–23 ISU Junior Grand Prix. They won the bronze medal at 2022 JGP Czech Republic, becoming the first ice dance team from Japan to win a Junior Grand Prix medal. Subsequently, the team finished eighth at 2022 JGP Poland.

In November, Kida/Morita won the 2022–23 Japan Junior Championships for a second consecutive time. They would then finish the season by placing sixteenth at the 2023 World Junior Championships in Calgary, Alberta, Canada. The pair parted ways following the season.

=== Ice dance with Utana Yoshida ===
==== 2023–2024 season: Debut of Yoshida/Morita ====
In April 2023, Morita sent a message to the then-partnerless Utana Yoshida on Instagram, asking if she would be interested in having a tryout with him. Yoshida agreed to this and the two would met up at the Okayama International Skating Rink in Okayama, where their tryout was monitored by Morita's coach, Cathy Reed, and Yoshida's coach, Rie Arikawa. This tryout would prove successful and end with Yoshida/Morita agreeing to pair up on that same day. Yoshida moved to Uji, Kyoto to train with Morita at the Kinoshita Skate Academy under both of their coaches, Reed and Arikawa.

Yoshida/Morita made their international competitive debut on the Challenger circuit at the 2023 CS Golden Spin of Zagreb, where they finished in fifth place. They next competed at the 2023–24 Japan Championships, which proved to be a tight contest between them and two other senior teams. They finished third in the rhythm dance after Morita fell in their twizzle sequence, coming behind Yoshida's former partner Nishiyama and his new partner Azusa Tanaka and the four-time national champions Komatsubara/Koleto. Yoshida/Morita then won the free dance, but they remained in third place overall for the bronze medal. Yoshida said that they were "happy to have skated at Nationals," but admitted they had come just short of their goal of hitting 110 points in the free dance.

With the close result at the national championships, the Japan Skating Federation opted to postpone assigning Japan's lone berth at the 2024 World Championships pending the results of all three teams at the 2024 Four Continents Championships. After traveling to Shanghai to compete, Yoshida/Morita finished tenth overall but more than sixteen points behind national champions Komatsubara/Koleto.

==== 2024–25 season: First national title ====
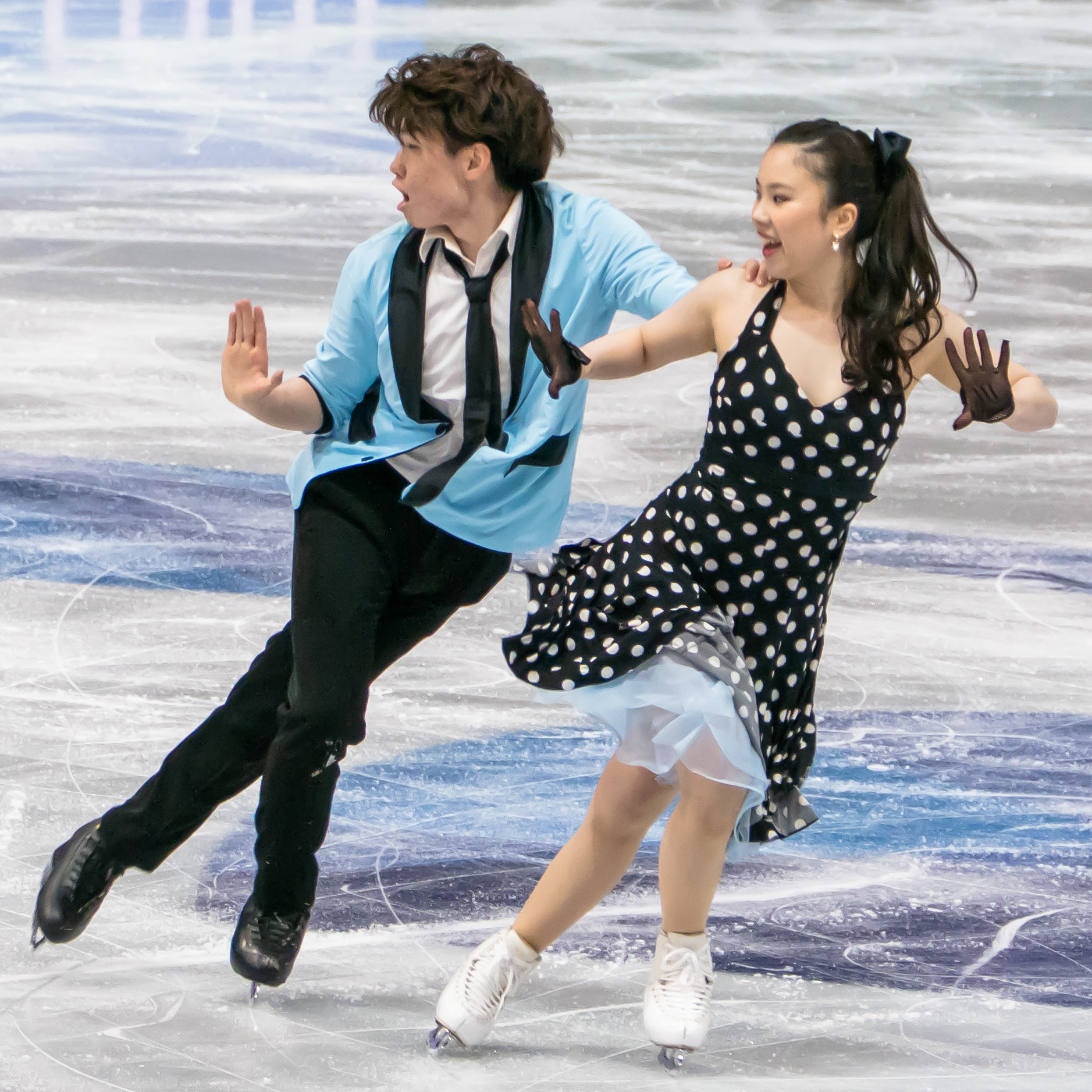
Yoshida/Morita performing their rhythm dance at the 2025 World Championships

Yoshida/Morita started the season by competing at the 2024 CS Nebelhorn Trophy, where they finished in fifth place. Going on to make their Grand Prix series debut, the duo finished ninth at the 2024 NHK Trophy.

In late December, Yoshida/Morita won the national title at the 2024–25 Japan Championships. They were subsequently named to the Four Continents and World teams.

Going on to compete at the 2025 Asian Winter Games in Harbin, China, Yoshida/Morita won the gold medal. They subsequently competed at the 2025 Four Continents Championships in Seoul, South Korea, finishing in eighth place.

At the 2025 World Championships in Boston, Massachusetts, United States, Yoshida/Morita placed twenty-second in the rhythm dance, only 0.40 points from qualifying for the free dance segment.

Selected to compete for Team Japan at the 2025 World Team Trophy, Yoshida/Morita placed sixth in all segments of the ice dance event and Team Japan won the silver medal overall. Following the event, the team added Scott Moir, Madison Hubbell, and Adrián Díaz to their coaching team.

==== 2025–26 season: Olympic team event silver and second national title ====
Yoshida/Morita opened their season by finishing sixth at the 2025 CS Kinoshita Group Cup. They then went on to compete at the final Olympic qualifying event, the 2025 Skate to Milano. Yoshida/Morita finished seventh overall and were named as the third alternates for the 2026 Winter Olympic ice dance team.

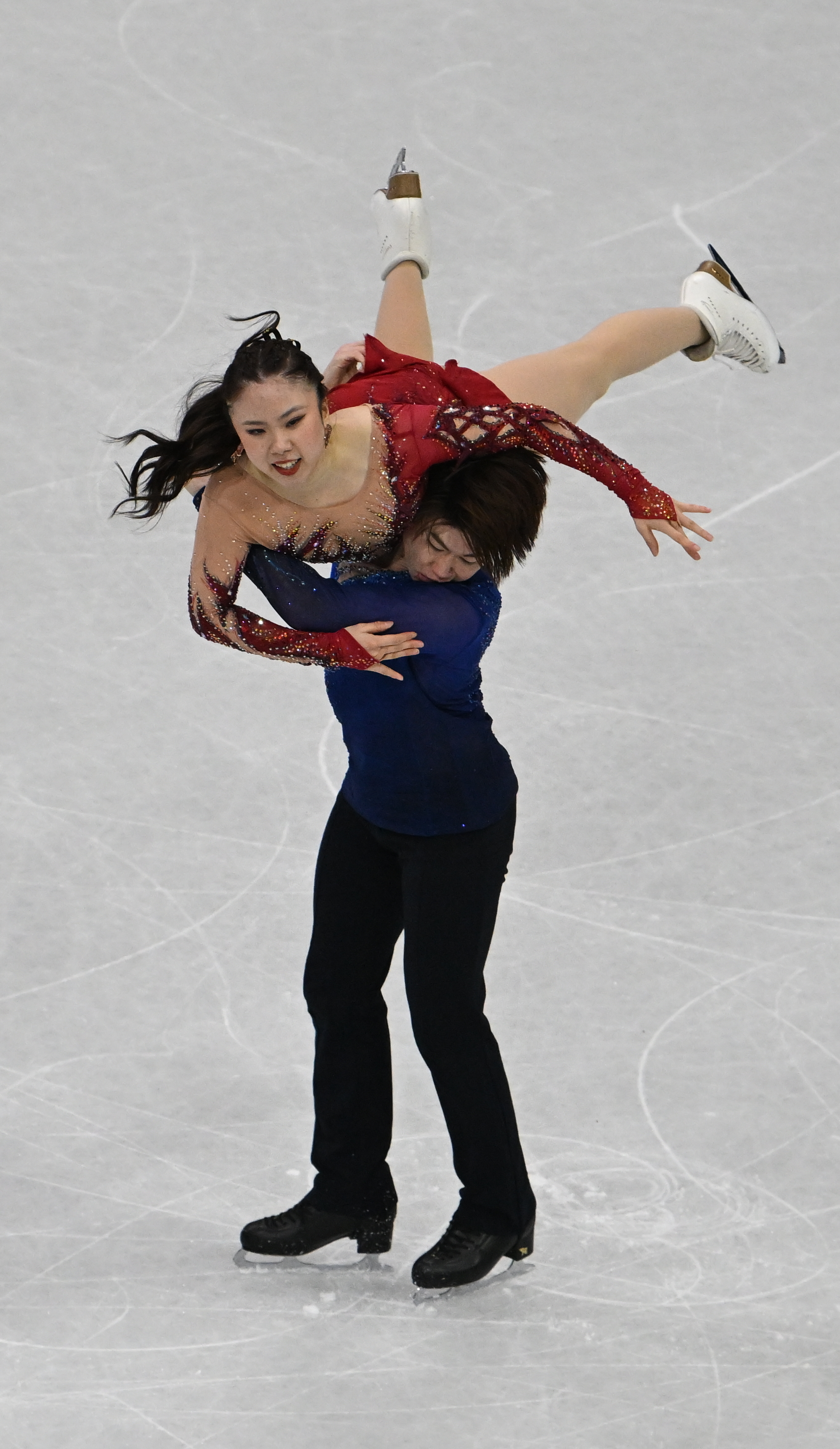
Yoshida/Morita performing a lift during their free dance at the 2026 Winter Olympics Figure Skating Team Event

They subsequently competed at the 2025 CS Trialeti Trophy, placing fifth overall. Selected as host picks at the 2025 NHK Trophy, Yoshida/Morita finished the event in tenth place overall.

In late December, Yoshida/Morita competed at the Japan Championships, winning their second consecutive national title. It was subsequently announced that Yoshida/Morita were selected to compete for Team Japan in the team event at the 2026 Winter Olympics. The following month, they finished seventh at the 2026 Four Continents Championships in Beijing, China.

On 6 February, Yoshida/Morita competed in the 2026 Winter Olympics Figure Skating Team Event where they finished eighth in the rhythm dance. "Today was so fun!" said Yoshida. "We really love the vibe of this event. It’s so fun to skate for a team, not just for ourselves, and we’re really here to do our best for Team Japan." The following day, they placed fifth in the free dance. "Since yesterday, including today, everyone really delivered amazing performances," noted Yoshida. "We also got in the rink today hoping to follow that flow as well. We think we were able to do that, even if just a little." With their combined placements, Team Japan won the silver medal overall.

Following the result, pianist, Jennifer Thomas, who composed Yoshida/Morita's free dance music praised the team on her Instagram account, saying, "You guys skated the most beautiful program, and a huge congratulations on helping your team win silver!"

The following month, Yoshida/Morita competed at the 2026 World Championships in Prague, Czech Republic. They earned a personal best in the rhythm dance segment and placed fifteenth thus qualifying for the free dance. Yoshida/Morita went on to place eighteenth in the free dance to finish in nineteenth place overall. "This season had been really long, but we were able to have many wonderful experiences," said Morita following their free dance performance. "I think those results led to our rhythm dance scores and being able to skate the free until the end. We'll use these experiences and do our best to improve even more next season."

==== 2026–27 season ====
Yoshida/Morita opened their season finishing 6th at the 2026 Kinoshita Cup.

== Programs ==
=== Ice dance with Utana Yoshida ===
Season	Rhythm dance	Free dance	Exhibition
2026–2027	Danse Macabre by Camille Saint-Saëns performed by Sephira; Carnival Chant Batería by Yaiza Varona choreo. by Cathy Reed		
2025–2026	Stomp to My Beat by JS16; Butterfly by Smile.dk; Stomp to My Beat by JS16 choreo. by Scott Moir, Madison Hubbell, & Adrián Díaz	Rise of the Phoenix by Jennifer Thomas; X-X by Hans Zimmer; Rise of the Phoenix by Quantum Infinity, Daniel O'Borne, & Matthew Cooper choreo. by Massimo Scali; Violin Fantasy on Puccini’s Turandot by Giacomo Puccini performed by Vanessa-Mae choreo. by Scott Moir, Madison Hubbell, & Adrián Díaz	I Wanna Dance by Artem Uzunov
2024–2025	Be-Bop-a-Lula by Gene Vincent and His Blue Caps & Tex Davis; Be-Bop-a-Lula (Original Artist Re-Recording) by Gene Vincent & Tex Davis; Whole Lotta Shakin' Goin' On by Dave Williams & Roy Hall performed by Elvis Presley choreo. by Cathy Reed	Romeo and Juliet, Op. 64; The Deaths of the Lovers; Introduction; Juliet’s Room; Dance of the Knights; Balcony Scene; Tybalt Interrupts; Dance of the Knights by Sergei Prokofiev choreo. by Scott Moir, Madison Hubbell, & Adrián Díaz	Apt. by Rosé & Bruno Mars; Feel It Still by Portugal. The Man
2023–2024	Real Wild Child (Wild One) by Iggy Pop & Johnny O'Keefe; Wild Thing by X & Chip Taylor; Wild Side by Mötley Crüe, Tommy Lee, & Nikki Sixx choreo. by Cathy Reed, Kaitlyn Weaver	Rise of the Phoenix by Jennifer Thomas; X-X by Hans Zimmer; Rise of the Phoenix by Quantum Infinity, Daniel O'Borne, & Matthew Cooper choreo. by Massimo Scali	

=== Ice dance with Nao Kida ===
Season	Rhythm dance	Free dance
2022–2023	Sentimientos by Jaime Wilensky, Andrés Linetzky, & Ernesto Romeo; Toca Tango by Juan Carlos Cáceres choreo. by Cathy Reed	Red Notice (from Red Notice) by Steve Jablonsky; Who Can You Trust (from Spy) by Theodore Shapiro & Craig Wedren performed by Ivy Levan; Rogue (from Spy Hunter) by Ryan Shore choreo. by Cathy Reed
2021–2022	FourFiveSeconds by Rihanna, Kanye West, & Paul McCartney; Diamonds by Rihanna, Sia, Benny Blanco, & Stargate choreo. by Cathy Reed	(I Can't Get No) Satisfaction; Angie; Roll Over Beethoven by The Rolling Stones choreo. by Cathy Reed, Emi Hirai, Marien de la Asuncion

== Competitive results ==
- GP – Event of the ISU Grand Prix Series
- JGP – Event of the ISU Junior Grand Prix Series
- CS – Event of the ISU Challenger Series
- TBD – Assigned
- WD – Withdrew from competition

=== Ice dance with Utana Yoshida ===
Competition placements at senior level
Season	2023–24	2024–25	2025–26	2026–27
Winter Olympics (Team event)			2nd	
World Championships		22nd	19th	
Four Continents Championships	10th	8th	7th	
Japan Championships	3rd	1st	1st	
World Team Trophy		2nd (6th)		
GP NHK Trophy		9th	10th	TBD
CS Golden Spin of Zagreb	5th			
CS Kinoshita Group Cup			6th	6th
CS Trialeti Trophy			5th	
Asian Winter Games		1st		
Skate to Milano			7th	

=== Ice dance with Nao Kida ===
International: Junior
Event	21–22	22–23
Junior Worlds	12th	16th
JGP Czech Republic		3rd
JGP Poland		8th
Bavarian Open	9th	
National
Japan Junior	1st	1st

== Detailed results ==
=== Ice dance with Utana Yoshida ===
ISU personal best scores in the +5/-5 GOE System
Segment	Type	Score	Event
Total	TSS	173.49	2026 World Championships
Rhythm dance	TSS	72.33	2026 World Championships
Rhythm dance	TES	42.40	2026 World Championships
Rhythm dance	PCS	30.07	2025 NHK Trophy
Free dance	TSS	103.27	2026 Four Continents Championships
Free dance	TES	59.91	2026 Four Continents Championships
Free dance	PCS	45.10	2024 CS Nebelhorn Trophy

Results in the 2023–24 season
Date	Event	RD		FD		Total	
Date	Event	P	Score	P	Score	P	Score
Dec 6–9, 2023	(Croatia) 2023 CS Golden Spin of Zagreb	7	62.88	5	101.32	5	164.20
Dec 20–24, 2023	2023–24 Japan Championships	3	64.00	1	109.17	3	173.17
Jan 30 – Feb 4, 2024	(China) 2024 Four Continents Championships	10	62.86	10	103.27	10	166.13

Results in the 2024–25 season
Date	Event	RD		FD		Total	
Date	Event	P	Score	P	Score	P	Score
Sep 19–21, 2024	(Germany) 2024 CS Nebelhorn Trophy	6	68.94	5	102.65	6	171.59
Nov 8–10, 2024	(Japan) 2024 NHK Trophy	9	64.30	9	97.06	9	161.36
Dec 19–22, 2024	2024–25 Japan Championships	1	71.84	1	104.37	1	176.21
Feb 11–13, 2025	(China) 2025 Asian Winter Games	1	68.88	2	104.43	1	173.31
Feb 19–23, 2025	(South Korea) 2025 Four Continents Championships	8	65.00	9	101.56	8	166.56
Mar 25–30, 2025	(United States) 2025 World Championships	22	67.69	—N/a	—N/a	22	67.69
Apr 17–20, 2025	(Japan) 2025 World Team Trophy	6	56.63	6	94.95	2 (6)	151.58

Results in the 2025–26 season
Date	Event	RD		FD		Total	
Date	Event	P	Score	P	Score	P	Score
Sep 5–7, 2025	(Japan) 2025 CS Kinoshita Group Cup	6	62.81	6	98.25	6	161.06
Sep 18–21, 2025	(China) 2025 ISU Skate to Milano	4	69.14	7	98.49	7	167.63
Oct 8–11, 2025	(Georgia (country)) 2025 CS Trialeti Trophy	5	69.69	7	98.27	5	167.96
Nov 7–9, 2025	(Japan) 2025 NHK Trophy	8	69.61	10	85.67	10	155.28
Dec 18–21, 2025	2025–26 Japan Championships	1	68.78	1	103.51	1	172.29
Jan 21–25, 2026	(China) 2026 Four Continents Championships	6	67.31	7	103.35	7	170.66
Feb 6–8, 2026	(Italy) 2026 Winter Olympics – Team event	8	68.64	5	98.55	2	—N/a
Mar 24–29, 2026	(Czech Republic) 2026 World Championships	15	72.33	18	101.16	19	173.49

Results in the 2026–27 season
Date	Event	RD		FD		Total	
Date	Event	P	Score	P	Score	P	Score
Sep 4–6, 2026	(Japan) 2026 Kinoshita Group Cup	4	71.50	6	98.99	6	170.49
Nov 27–29, 2026	(Japan) 2026 NHK Trophy						TBD

=== Ice dance with Nao Kida ===
2022–23 season
Date	Event	RD	FD	Total
February 27–March 5, 2023	2023 World Junior Championships	18; 54.19	15; 82.53	16; 136.72
November 25–27, 2022	2022–23 Japan Junior Championships	1; 65.17	1; 96.75	1; 161.92
September 28–October 1, 2024	2022 JGP Poland	7; 56.96	11; 78.56	8; 135.52
August 31–September 3, 2022	2022 JGP Czech Republic	3; 61.05	5; 88.61	3; 149.66
2021–22 season
Date	Event	RD	FD	Total
April 13–17, 2022	2022 World Junior Championships	14; 52.02	12; 80.92	12; 132.94
November 19–21, 2021	2021–22 Japan Junior Championships	1; 52.44	1; 78.62	1; 131.08
January 18–23, 2022	2022 Bavarian Open	11; 47.40	7; 80.51	9; 127.91
November 19–21, 2021	2021–22 Japan Junior Championships	1; 52.44	1; 78.62	1; 131.08
