= Roman Savosin =

Russian figure skater (born 1999)

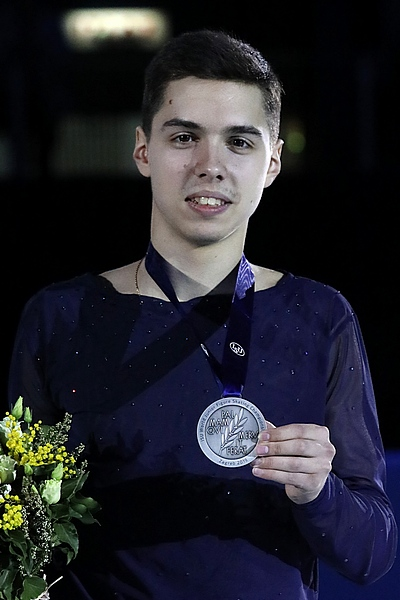
- Savosin at the 2019 World Junior Championships

Personal information
- Native name: Роман Андреевич Савосин
- Full name: Roman Andreyevich Savosin
- Born: 4 December 1999 (age 26) Moscow, Russia
- Height: 1.70 m (5 ft 7 in)

Figure skating career
- Country: Russia
- Coach: Maria Butyrskaya, Alexei Chetverukhin, Anastasia Kazakova
- Skating club: Sambo 70
- Began skating: 2003
Medal record
Representing Russia
Figure skating: Men's singles
World Junior Championships
Silver medal – second place	2019 Zagreb	Men's singles

Roman Andreyevich Savosin (Russian: Роман Андреевич Савосин, born 4 December 1999) is a Russian figure skater. He is the 2019 Junior World silver medalist, the 2016 CS Tallinn Trophy champion, 2016 CS Ondrej Nepela Memorial bronze medalist, and 2016 JGP France champion.

== Career ==
Savosin began learning to skate in 2003.

=== 2015–2016 season ===
After winning the bronze medal at the 2016 Russian Junior Championships, he was selected to compete at the 2016 World Junior Championships in Debrecen. He qualified for the free skate in Hungary by placing thirteenth in the short program and went on to finish fourteenth overall.

=== 2016–2017 season ===
Savosin received his first Junior Grand Prix (JGP) assignment in the 2016–17 season. Ranked second in both segments, he won the gold medal in Saint-Gervais-les-Bains, France, by a margin of 7.74 points over his teammate Ilia Skirda. After winning bronze at his second JGP event, in Ostrava, Czech Republic, he qualified to the JGP Final.

Savosin's senior international debut came in late September and early October 2016 at a Challenger Series (CS) event, the Ondrej Nepela Memorial. He placed fifth in the short and second in the free skate to win the bronze medal with a personal best score of 222.37 points, behind Sergei Voronov and Kevin Reynolds. In November, he outscored Anton Shulepov for gold at the 2016 CS Tallinn Trophy after placing second in the short and first in the free skate. Competing at the 2016–17 JGP Final, held in December in Marseille, he placed third in the short, fourth in the free, and fourth overall.

=== 2017–2018 season ===
Savosin started his season by competing in the 2017 JGP series. He first won the silver medal in Brisbane, Australia, and then he placed fourth in Riga, Latvia. In November he placed fourth at the 2017 CS Warsaw Cup.

In December 2017 Savosin placed tenth at the 2018 Russian Championships. In January 2018 he won the silver medal at the 2018 Russian Junior Championships after placing sixth in the short program and second in the free skate.

In March 2018 Savosin competed at the 2018 Junior Worlds where he placed fifth after placing twelfth in the short program and fifth in the free skate.

=== 2018–2019 season ===
Savosin started his season by competing in the 2018 JGP series. At his first JGP event of the season he placed fifth in Bratislava, Slovakia. At his second JGP event he won the bronze medal in Linz, Austria. In late November Savosin finished fifth at the 2018 CS Tallinn Trophy. At the 2019 Russian Championships, he placed 12th. A month later, Savosin to earn the bronze medal at junior nationals and qualify for 2019 World Junior Championships.

In the 2019 World Junior Championships, he finished sixth in the short and first in the free, with a total of 229.28 points, Savosin won silver medal.

=== 2019–2020 season ===
Competing in his first senior Grand Prix, Savoisin finished twelfth at the 2019 Skate America.

=== 2020–2021 season ===
Savosin debuted at the senior Russian test skates after recovering from injury. Competing on the domestic Cup of Russia series, he won the silver medal at the first stage in Syzran and came sixth at the fourth stage in Kazan.

With the COVID-19 pandemic continuing to affect international travel, the ISU opted to run the Grand Prix based primarily on geographic location. Savosin was assigned to the 2020 Rostelecom Cup, where he placed eighth in both segments and overall.

Savosin withdrew from the 2021 Russian Championships after contracting COVID-19.

=== 2021–2022 season ===
Savosin finished in fifteenth place at the 2022 Russian Championships.

== Programs ==
Season	Short program	Free skating
2024-2025	Satschem Nje Tebja Polubil by Ivan Rebroff	Quel Punto; Confessa; La Cumbia Di Chi Cambia by Adriano Celentano; Piano Concerto No. 2 by Sergei Rachmaninoff performed by David Garrett
2023-2024	You Raise Me Up by Rolf Løvland and Brendan Graham performed by Josh Groban	Quel Punto; Confessa; La Cumbia Di Chi Cambia by Adriano Celentano
2020–2021	Bella ciao (Italian Folk Song)	Requiem by Vicente Amigo
2019–2020	Bessarabia Gypsy Dance choreo. by Anastasia Kazakova	Violin Concerto in D Major by Pyotr Ilyich Tchaikovsky choreo. by Nikolai Morozov
2018–2019	Granada by Agustín Lara	Piano Concerto No. 2 by Sergei Rachmaninoff performed by David Garrett
2017–2018	Music Selection by Hugues Le Bars	Smuga Cienia by Wojciech Kilar
2016–2017	Bella Ciao by André Rieu	Smuga Cienia by Wojciech Kilar
2015–2016	Il Mirto e la Rosa by Alessandro Safina	Medley by Adriano Celentano

== Competitive highlights ==
GP: Grand Prix; CS: Challenger Series; JGP: Junior Grand Prix

International
Event	12–13	13–14	14–15	15–16	16–17	17–18	18–19	19–20	20–21	21–22	23–24	24–25	25-26
GP Cup of China								WD					
GP Rostelecom Cup									8th				
GP Skate America								12th					
CS Ondrej Nepela					3rd								
CS Tallinn Trophy					1st		5th						
CS Warsaw Cup						4th							
International: Junior
Junior Worlds				14th		5th	2nd						
JGP Final					4th								
JGP Australia						2nd							
JGP Austria							3rd						
JGP Czech Rep.					3rd								
JGP France					1st								
JGP Latvia						4th							
JGP Slovakia							5th						
NRW Trophy		1st		1st									
National
Russia					WD	10th	12th	WD	WD	15th	7th	10th	16th
Russia, Junior	13th	12th		3rd	8th	2nd	3rd						
Russian Cup Final			6th J	1st J		10th	5th	7th			5th		
TBD = Assigned; WD = Withdrew

== Detailed results ==
Small medals for short and free programs awarded only at ISU Championships.

2021–22 season
Date	Event	SP	FS	Total
December 21–26, 2021	2022 Russian Championships	14; 82.64	16; 142.76	15; 225.40
2020–21 season
Date	Event	SP	FS	Total
Feb. 26 – Mar. 2, 2021	2021 Russian Cup Final domestic competition	4; 87.36	8; 147.53	7; 234.89
November 20–22, 2020	2020 Rostelecom Cup	8; 82.35	8; 167.72	8; 250.07
2019–20 season
Date	Event	SP	FS	Total
October 18–20, 2019	2019 Skate America	12; 57.92	12; 124.24	12; 182.16

2018–19 season
Date	Event	Level	SP	FS	Total
March 4–10, 2019	2019 World Junior Championships	Junior	6; 78.33	1; 150.95	2; 229.28
February 1–4, 2019	2019 Russian Junior Championships	Junior	7; 78.71	3; 150.81	3; 229.52
December 19–23, 2018	2019 Russian Championships	Senior	9; 70.71	13; 129.19	12; 199.90
Nov. 26 – Dec. 2, 2018	2018 CS Tallinn Trophy	Senior	4; 71.50	5; 133.74	5; 205.24
Aug. 29 – Sept. 1, 2018	2018 JGP Austria	Junior	4; 71.41	3; 139.69	3; 211.10
August 22–25, 2018	2018 JGP Slovakia	Junior	4; 67.10	7; 122.76	5; 189.86
2017–18 season
Date	Event	Level	SP	FS	Total
March 5–11, 2018	2018 World Junior Championships	Junior	12; 65.36	5; 142.55	5; 207.91
January 23–26, 2018	2018 Russian Junior Championships	Junior	6; 73.48	2; 162.16	2; 235.64
December 21–24, 2017	2018 Russian Championships	Senior	9; 77.79	12; 140.82	10; 218.61
November 16–19, 2017	2017 CS Warsaw Cup	Senior	4; 64.93	4; 132.22	4; 197.15
September 6–9, 2017	2017 JGP Latvia	Junior	3; 63.95	3; 123.59	4; 187.54
August 23–26, 2017	2017 JGP Australia	Junior	3; 68.68	3; 127.52	2; 196.20
2016–17 season
Date	Event	Level	SP	FS	Total
February 1–5, 2017	2017 Russian Junior Championships	Junior	4; 77.57	10; 134.73	8; 212.30
December 8–11, 2016	2016−17 JGP Final	Junior	3; 72.98	4; 139.41	4; 212.39
November 20–27, 2016	2016 CS Tallinn Trophy	Senior	2; 71.39	1; 146.67	1; 218.06
Sept. 30 – Oct. 2, 2016	2016 CS Ondrej Nepela Memorial	Senior	5; 68.10	2; 154.27	3; 222.37
Aug. 31 – Sept. 4, 2016	2016 JGP Czech Republic	Junior	3; 72.90	3; 134.74	3; 207.64
August 24–28, 2016	2016 JGP France	Junior	2; 67.44	2; 130.84	1; 198.28
2015–16 season
Date	Event	Level	SP	FS	Total
March 14–20, 2016	2016 World Junior Championships	Junior	13; 64.00	14; 117.65	14; 181.65
January 19–23, 2016	2016 Russian Junior Championships	Junior	3; 71.57	4; 135.83	3; 207.40
November 24–29, 2015	2015 NRW Trophy	Junior	1; 64.25	1; 105.25	1; 169.50
2013–14 season
Date	Event	Level	SP	FS	Total
January 22–25, 2014	2014 Russian Junior Championships	Junior	13; 58.25	10; 115.64	12; 173.89
December 4–8, 2013	2013 NRW Trophy	Junior	3; 57.80	1; 111.83	1; 169.63
2012–13 season
Date	Event	Level	SP	FS	Total
Jan. 31 – Feb. 3, 2013	2013 Russian Junior Championships	Junior	12; 62.70	13; 114.11	13; 176.81
