= Ilia Skirda =

Russian figure skater

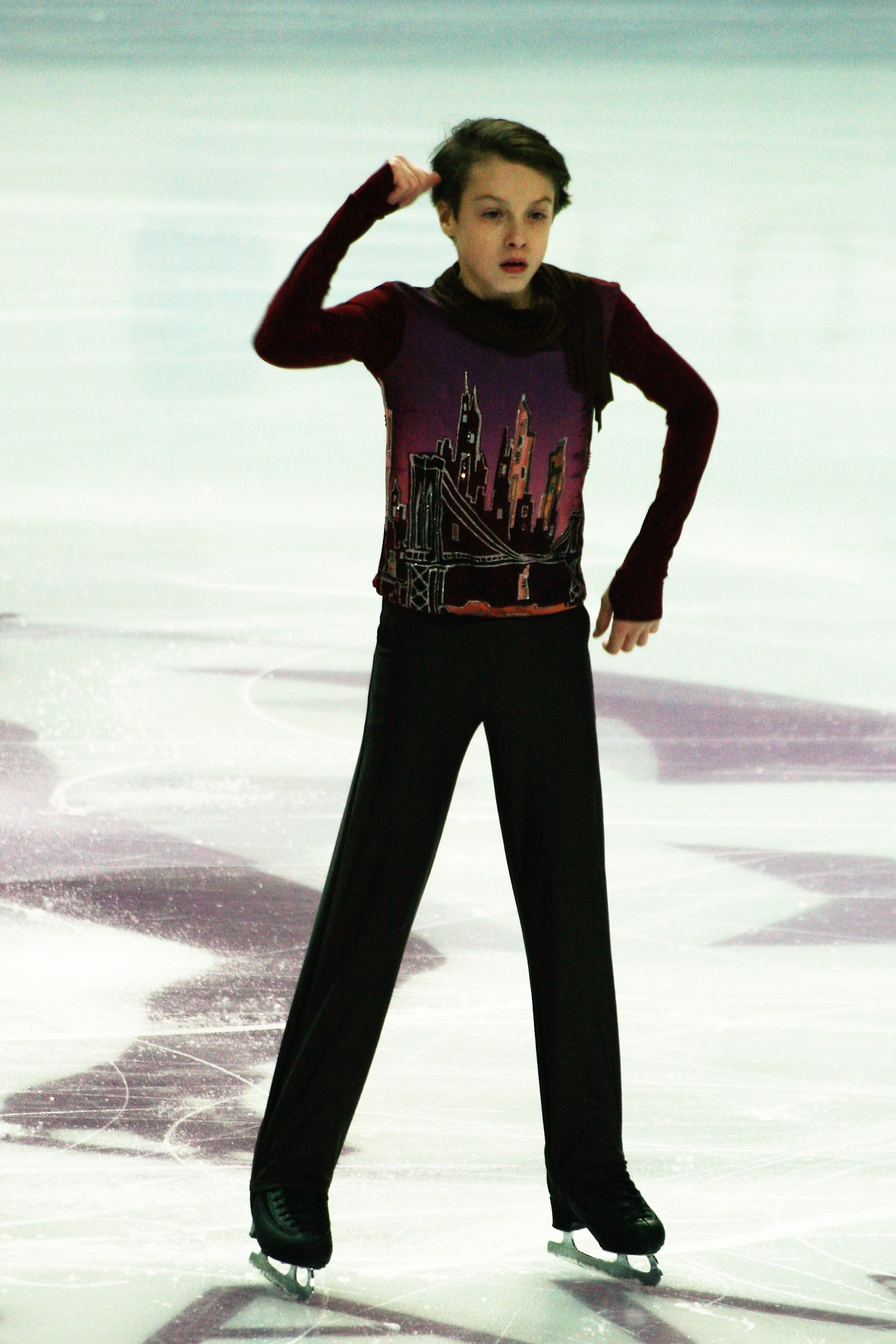
- Skirda at the 2016−17 JGP Final

Personal information
- Native name: Илья Валерьевич Скирда
- Full name: Ilia Valeryevich Skirda
- Other names: Ilya Skirda
- Born: 21 September 2002 (age 23) Moscow, Russia
- Height: 1.54 m (5 ft 1/2 in)

Figure skating career
- Country: Russia
- Coach: Eteri Tutberidze, Sergei Dudakov
- Skating club: Sambo 70

Ilia Valeryevich Skirda (Russian: Илья Валерьевич Скирда, born 21 September 2002) is a Russian figure skater who competes in men's singles. He has won two silver medals on the ISU Junior Grand Prix series.

== Career ==
Skirda skated at Sokolniki Sports school before relocating to Sambo 70 skating club in 2013. He finished 7th at his first junior nationals, in 2015. After a year, he finished 4th at the 2016 Russian Junior Championships, behind Roman Savosin.

In August 2016, at age 13, Skirda made his international debut at the 2016–17 Junior Grand Prix (JGP) competition in Saint-Gervais-les-Bains, France. Ranked 9th in the short and first in the free skate, he won the silver medal behind Savosin. In his next event at the 2016 JGP Slovenia, Skirda won another silver medal after placing fourth in the short and second in the free skate with a total of 208.28 points. Skirda's results have qualified for his first 2016–17 JGP Final to be held in Marseille, France.

== Programs ==
Season	Short program	Free skating
2016–2017	Mr. Bojangles by Robbie Williams	Once Upon a Time in America by Ennio Morricone

== Competitive highlights ==
JGP: Junior Grand Prix

International
Event	14–15	15–16	16–17	17–18	18–19
JGP Final			6th		
JGP France			2nd		
JGP Slovenia			2nd		
Sofia Trophy					3rd
National
Russian Champ.			12th		
Russian Jr. Champ.	7th	4th	7th		
J: Junior level

== Detailed results ==
=== Junior level ===
2016–17 season
Date	Event	Level	SP	FS	Total
1–5 February 2017	2017 Russian Junior Championships	Junior	8; 71.44	6; 143.12	7; 214.56
22–25 December 2016	2017 Russian Championships	Senior	12; 68.63	12; 131.76	12; 200.39
8–11 December 2016	2016−17 JGP Final	Junior	6; 68.31	5; 138.80	6; 207.11
22–24 September 2016	2016 JGP Slovenia	Junior	4; 69.32	2; 138.96	2; 208.28
25–27 August 2016	2016 JGP France	Junior	9; 56.07	1; 134.47	2; 190.54
2015–16 season
Date	Event	Level	SP	FS	Total
21–23 January 2016	2016 Russian Junior Championships	Junior	7; 65.56	5; 132.75	4; 198.31
2014–15 season
Date	Event	Level	SP	FS	Total
4–7 February 2015	2015 Russian Junior Championships	Junior	10; 61.57	6; 127.66	7; 189.23
