= Dominique Deniaud =

French ice dancer (born 1977)

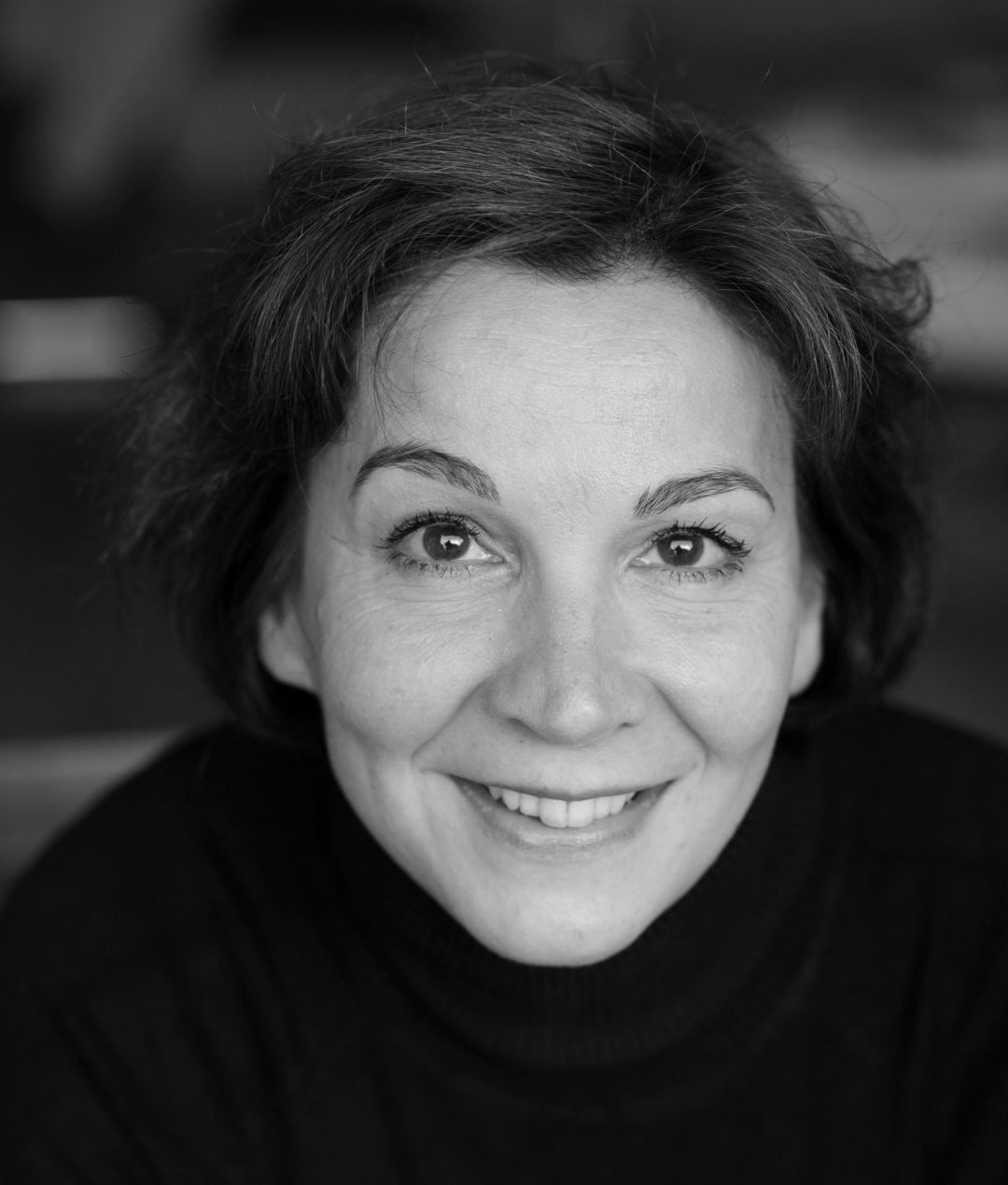
Dominique Deniaud.jpg

Dominique Deniaud (born August 22, 1977, in Nantes) is a former ice dancer who represented France.

With partner Martial Jaffredo, Deniaud finished third at the French Figure Skating Championships in 1998. They then finished 20th at the 1998 Winter Olympics and 24th at the World Figure Skating Championships tonight. The following year, they finished second at the national championships and 13th at the European Figure Skating Championships.
