= Figure skating at the 2026 Winter Olympics – Qualification =

The number of entries for the figure skating events at the Winter Olympics is determined by quotas set by the International Olympic Committee. A total of 142 quota spots were available to athletes to compete in the figure skating events at the 2026 Winter Olympics. There were 29 spots allotted each in men's and women's singles, 19 in pair skating, and 23 in ice dance. Additionally, ten nations qualified for the team event. There is no individual athlete qualification to the Olympics; the choice of whom to send to the Olympic Games is at the discretion of each country's National Olympic Committee. Each National Olympic Committee could enter a maximum of 18 skaters, with a maximum of nine men or nine women.

== Qualification of nations ==
Countries were able to qualify entries to the 2026 Winter Olympics in two ways. Most spots were allocated based on the results of the 2025 World Figure Skating Championships. There, countries were able to qualify up to three entries in each discipline according to a predetermined system. The results of the 2025 World Championships determined 83 total spots: 24 entries each in men's and women's singles, 16 in pairs, and 19 in ice dance.

The remainder of the spots were filled at the Skate to Milano in Beijing, China, in September 2025. Countries that had already earned an entry to the Olympics were not allowed to qualify additional entries at this final qualifying competition. However, if a country earned two or three spots at the World Championships, but did not have two or three skaters, respectively, qualify for the free skate, then they were allowed to send a skater who did not reach the free segment at the World Championships to the Skate to Milano to qualify the remaining spot(s). Unlike at the World Championships, where countries could qualify more than one spot depending on the placement of their skater(s), at the Skate to Milano, countries could earn only one spot per discipline, regardless of ranking. According to guidelines established by the International Skating Union (ISU), nations had to select skaters and teams who had achieved a minimum Total Elements Score at an ISU-recognized international competition on or before 26 January 2026. The ISU also decided that politically-evaluated and screened skaters from Russia and Belarus could attempt to qualify as Individual Neutral Athletes at the Skate to Milano, although they would not be eligible to compete in the team event.

If a country declined to use one or more of its qualified spots, the vacated spot was awarded using the results of the Skate to Milano in descending order of placement.

For the team event, scores from the 2025 World Figure Skating Championships and the 2025–26 Grand Prix of Figure Skating season were tabulated to establish the ten top nations. Each nation compiled a score from their top performers in each of the four disciplines. The 2025 Grand Prix of Figure Skating Final was the final event to affect the team event score.

== Qualified nations ==
Number of qualified skaters or teams per nation
| Nations | Men's singles | Women's singles | Pairs | Ice dance | Team event | Add. | Skater(s) |
|---|---|---|---|---|---|---|---|
| Armenia | | | 1 | | | | 2 |
| Australia | | | 1 | 1 | | | 4 |
| Austria | | 1 | | | | | 1 |
| Azerbaijan | 1 | | | | | | 1 |
| Belgium | | 2 | | | | | 2 |
| Bulgaria | | 1 | | | | | 1 |
| Canada | 1 | 1 | 2 | 3 | Yes | | 12 |
| China | 1 | 1 | 1 | 1 | Yes | | 6 |
| Chinese Taipei | 1 | | | | | | 1 |
| Czech Republic | | | | 2 | | | 4 |
| Estonia | 1 | 1 | | | | | 2 |
| Finland | | 1 | | 1 | | | 3 |
| France | 2 | 1 | 1 | 2 | Yes | | 9 |
| Georgia | 1 | 1 | 1 | 1 | Yes | | 6 |
| Germany | | | 2 | 1 | | | 6 |
| Great Britain | | 1 | 1 | 2 | Yes | 1 (Note: Although Great Britain did not qualify a men's singles skater for the team event, they were able to use an additional athlete quota in order to complete their team.) | 8 |
| Hungary | | | 1 | | | | 2 |
| Individual Neutral Athletes | 1 | 2 | | | | | 3 |
| Israel | | 1 | | | | | 1 |
| Italy | 2 | 1 | 2 | 1 | Yes | | 9 |
| Japan | 3 | 3 | 2 | | Yes | 2 (Note: Although Japan did not qualify an ice dance team for the team event, they were able to use two additional athlete quotas in order to complete their team.) | 10 |
| Kazakhstan | 1 | 1 | | | | | 2 |
| Latvia | 2 | | | | | | 2 |
| Lithuania | | 1 | | 1 | | | 3 |
| Mexico | 1 | | | | | | 1 |
| Netherlands | | | 1 | | | | 2 |
| Poland | 1 | 1 | 1 | | Yes | 2 (Note: Although Poland did not qualify an ice dance team for the team event, they were able to use two additional athlete quotas in order to complete their team.) | 6 |
| Romania | | 1 | | | | | 1 |
| Slovakia | 1 | | | | | | 1 |
| South Korea | 2 | 2 | | 1 | Yes | | 6 |
| Spain | 1 | | | 2 | | | 5 |
| Sweden | 1 | | | 1 | | | 3 |
| Switzerland | 1 | 2 | | | | | 3 |
| Ukraine | 1 | | | | | | 1 |
| United States | 3 | 3 | 2 | 3 | Yes | | 16 |
| Total: 35 NOCs | 29 | 29 | 19 teams | 23 teams | 10 teams | 5 | 147 |

== Qualification summary ==
=== Men's singles ===
Twenty-four quota spots in the men's event were awarded based on results at the 2025 World Figure Skating Championships. An additional five spots were awarded at the Skate to Milano. Petr Gumennik of Russia earned a spot at the Olympics as an Individual Neutral Athlete.

Quota spots in men's singles
| Event | Athletes per NOC | Qualifying NOCs | Total |
|---|---|---|---|
| 2025 World Championships | 3 | United States; Japan | 24 |
| 2025 World Championships | 2 | France; Italy; Latvia | 24 |
| 2025 World Championships | 1 | Kazakhstan; South Korea; Georgia; Switzerland; Canada; Azerbaijan; Slovakia; Sweden; China; Estonia; Spain; Poland | 24 |
| Skate to Milano | 1 | Individual Neutral Athletes (Petr Gumennik); South Korea; Mexico; Ukraine; Chinese Taipei | 5 |
| Total | | | **29** |

=== Women's singles ===
Twenty-four quota spots in the women's event were awarded based on results at the 2025 World Figure Skating Championships. An additional five spots were awarded at the Skate to Milano. Adeliia Petrosian of Russia and Viktoriia Safonova of Belarus earned spots at the Olympics as Individual Neutral Athletes.

Quota spots in women's singles
| Event | Athletes per NOC | Qualifying NOCs | Total |
|---|---|---|---|
| 2025 World Championships | 3 | United States; Japan | 24 |
| 2025 World Championships | 2 | South Korea; Switzerland | 24 |
| 2025 World Championships | 1 | Belgium; Estonia; Canada; Italy; Kazakhstan; France; Israel; Austria; Finland; Romania; Poland; Bulgaria; Great Britain; Lithuania | 24 |
| Skate to Milano | 1 | Individual Neutral Athletes (Adeliia Petrosian); Georgia; Belgium; Individual Neutral Athletes (Viktoriia Safonova); China | 5 |
| Total | | | **29** |

=== Pairs ===
Fifteen quota spots in the pairs event were awarded based on results at the 2025 World Figure Skating Championships. An additional three spots were awarded at the Skate to Milano. Uzbekistan originally qualified one quota spot in the pairs event after Ekaterina Geynish and Dmitrii Chigirev finished in tenth place at the 2025 World Championships. However, after Geynish and Chigirev ended their partnership, the spot was reallocated to France, who chose to send Camille Kovalev and Pavel Kovalev.

Quota spots in pair skating
| Event | Teams per NOC | Qualifying NOCs | Total teams |
|---|---|---|---|
| 2025 World Championships | 2 | Canada; Italy; Germany; United States | 15 |
| 2025 World Championships | 1 | Japan; Georgia; Australia; Hungary; ~~Uzbekistan~~; Great Britain; Poland; Netherlands | 15 |
| Skate to Milano | 1 | China; Armenia; Japan; France | 4 |
| Total | | | **19** |

=== Ice dance ===
Eighteen quota spots in the ice dance event were awarded based on results at the 2025 World Figure Skating Championships. An additional four spots were awarded at the Skate to Milano. Finland had originally qualified two quota spots in the ice dance event at the 2025 World Championships; however, when Yuka Orihara was unable to obtain Finnish citizenship, Finland ultimately relinquished their second quota spot. As a result, the spot was reallocated to Sweden, and Milla Ruud Reitan and Nikolaj Majorov became the first Swedish ice dance team to ever qualify for the Winter Olympics.

Quota spots in ice dance
| Event | Teams per NOC | Qualifying NOCs | Total |
|---|---|---|---|
| 2025 World Championships | 3 | Canada; United States | 18 |
| 2025 World Championships | 2 | Czech Republic; ~~Finland~~; France; Great Britain | 18 |
| 2025 World Championships | 1 | Finland; Italy; Spain; Georgia; Germany; South Korea | 18 |
| Skate to Milano | 1 | Lithuania; Australia; Spain; China; Sweden | 5 |
| Total | | | **23** |

=== Team event ===
In order for a nation to qualify for the team event, it had to have qualified entrants in at least three of the four disciplines (men's singles, women's singles, pair skating, or ice dance). The disciplines for which nations qualified entrants for the team event at the 2022 Winter Olympics are identified with a green check mark ( ✓). If there were not ten nations that had qualified entrants in all four disciplines, nations with three entrants could use an additional athlete quota to fill their team. These athletes were eligible to compete in the team event, but not in the individual Olympic events.

Qualification for figure skating team event
| Pl. | Nation | M | W | P | D | Total |
|---|---|---|---|---|---|---|
| 1 | United States | Yes | Yes | Yes | Yes | 7069 |
| 2 | Japan | Yes | Yes | Yes | | 6027 |
| 3 | Italy | Yes | Yes | Yes | Yes | 4606 |
| 4 | Canada | Yes | Yes | Yes | Yes | 4231 |
| 5 | Georgia | Yes | Yes | Yes | Yes | 4106 |
| 6 | France | Yes | Yes | Yes | Yes | 3829 |
| 7 | Great Britain | | Yes | Yes | Yes | 2671 |
| 8 | South Korea | Yes | Yes | No | Yes | 2171 |
| 9 | China | Yes | Yes | Yes | Yes | 2132 |
| 10 | Poland | Yes | Yes | Yes | | 776 |

=== Top five NOCs on waitlist per discipline ===
If a country rejected a quota spot, then the additional quota became available. A country could be eligible for one quota spot per event in the reallocation process. The following list was compiled after the remaining spots were allocated at the Skate to Milano. Countries marked in bold with a ● accepted a reallocated quota.

Quota spot waitlist
| Men's singles | Women's singles | Pairs | Ice dance |
|---|---|---|---|
| Monaco; France; Czech Republic; Germany; Israel | Cyprus; Norway; Estonia; Sweden; New Zealand | **France ●** Ukraine; United States; Czech Republic; Iceland | **Sweden ●** Hungary; Japan; Italy; Ireland |
