= 2025 World Figure Skating Championships =

2025 ISU World Figure Skating Championships

- Type: ISU Championship
- Date: March 26 – 30
- Season: 2024–25
- Location: Boston, Massachusetts, United States
- Host: U.S. Figure Skating
- Venue: TD Garden

Champions
- Men's singles: (United States) Ilia Malinin
- Women's singles: (United States) Alysa Liu
- Pairs: (Japan) Riku Miura and Ryuichi Kihara
- Ice dance: (United States) Madison Chock and Evan Bates
- Previous: 2024 World Championships
- Next: 2026 World Championships

The 2025 World Figure Skating Championships were held from March 26 to 30 at the TD Garden in Boston, Massachusetts, in the United States. Sanctioned by the International Skating Union (ISU), the World Championships are considered the most prestigious event in figure skating. Medals were awarded in men's singles, women's singles, pair skating, and ice dance. The competition determined the entry quotas for each skating federation to the 2026 Winter Olympics. Ilia Malinin and Alysa Liu, both of the United States, won the men's and women's events, respectively. Riku Miura and Ryuichi Kihara of Japan won the pairs event, and Madison Chock and Evan Bates of the United States won the ice dance event.

== Background ==
The World Figure Skating Championships are considered the most prestigious event in figure skating. The 2025 World Championships were held from March 26 to 30 at the TD Garden in Boston, Massachusetts, in the United States. The competition occurred less than two months after the 2025 Potomac River mid-air collision that downed American Airlines Flight 5342, killing multiple junior skaters and coaches of the Skating Club of Boston. A ceremony was held at the start of the competition to honor the skaters, coaches, and family members who died. International Skating Union (ISU) president Jae Youl Kim attended the ceremony and stated: "Someone once told me time is a great healer, but for those who have experienced deep loss, we know that time does not simply erase pain. For many of us, it feels like we are frozen in time". The ceremony was attended by family members of the victims and alumni of the Skating Club of Boston, as well as Maura Healey, governor of Massachusetts, and Michelle Wu, mayor of Boston.

=== Men's singles ===
Defending World champion Ilia Malinin of the United States had not lost a competition all season and entered the competition heavily favored to win. Malinin was grieved by the loss of friends and training partners who had died in the Potomac crash and said he wanted to deliver a performance that he and everyone could be proud of. When asked about rivals, Malinin responded, "I would consider myself to be my biggest rival... I always like to compete against myself and to really just push my own limit."

Yuma Kagiyama of Japan entered the World Championships after losing to Cha Jun-hwan of South Korea at the 2025 Asian Winter Games. Experimenting with new technical content and new jumps had led to a very inconsistent season, and a World Championship medal, although in reach, was not a certainty. Adam Siao Him Fa of France, who had been the last skater to beat Malinin in competition, had also had an inconsistent season, having lost his European Championship title to Lukas Britschgi of Switzerland and also having withdrawn from the Grand Prix of Figure Skating Final due to a persistent ankle injury, which had affected his performance and caused mistakes throughout the season. The injury's effect on his stamina was visible at the 2024 Cup of China, where he had appeared visibly exhausted at the end of the free skate. To help his ankle heal properly, and to achieve some consistency, Siao Him Fa chose to simplify his technical content for the World Championship.

Mikhail Shaidorov of Kazakhstan, who had replaced Siao Him Fa at the Grand Prix Final and ultimately finished there in fourth place, had also recently won the 2025 Four Continents Championships by a margin of twenty points. Additionally, Shaidorov had become the first skater to land a difficult triple Axel-quadruple toe loop jump combination earlier in the season.

=== Women's singles ===
Unlike the men's event, there was no clear front-runner in the leadup to the women's event. Three-time World Champion Kaori Sakamoto of Japan had struggled throughout the season, finishing third at the Grand Prix Final and second at the 2025 Asian Winter Games. Sakamoto admitted that she did not feel fully ready for the World Championships due to an adjustment in program difficulty, and questioned whether her stamina was ready for the demands of her free skate program this season. Sakamoto also faced pressure in Japan to maintain her high standards, with five out of the six skaters qualifying for the Grand Prix Final having come from Japan.

Reigning World silver medalist Isabeau Levito of the United States had missed out on most of the season due to a foot injury that had prevented her from skating for three months. At the Road to 26 Trophy, an Olympic test event in Milan in February, she acknowledged she was still not completely fit, and there were concerns as to how she would do at the World Championships. Amber Glenn, also of the United States, was undefeated in competition this season, having won the 2024 Grand Prix de France and the 2024 Cup of China, as well as the Grand Prix Final.

Reigning World bronze medalist Kim Chae-yeon of South Korea had won the biggest title of her career at the 2025 Four Continents Championships with personal bests in the short program, free skate, and total score. Additionally, she had won the gold medal at the Asian Winter Games. Despite having lost the Grand Prix Final, she had performed consistently well during the second half of the season and was favored to win a medal at the World Championships.

Alysa Liu of the United States, who won the bronze medal at the 2022 World Championships, had returned to competition this season after a two-year hiatus. She had finished in second place at the 2025 U.S. Championships and fourth at the Four Continents Championships. After the Four Continents Championships, she discussed the challenges and enjoyment of returning to competitive skating. "It's been so hard this season," she stated. "I mean, of course, this was really hard to get through to, but it felt a lot lighter, and I could actually move through it with enjoyment."

=== Pairs ===
After winning the 2024 Skate Canada International and the 2024 Finlandia Trophy, the reigning World Champions, Deanna Stellato-Dudek and Maxime Deschamps of Canada, ultimately withdrew from the Grand Prix Final due to Deschamps being ill. They also physically struggled at the 2025 Four Continents Championships after Stellato-Dudek fell during practice and injured her back. On a more positive note, it was announced that Stellato-Dudek had officially become a Canadian citizen, allowing her and Deschamps to compete at the 2026 Winter Olympics in Milan.

Reigning silver medalists and 2023 World Champions Riku Miura and Ryuichi Kihara faced inconsistency, as multiple issues with their side-by-side jumps throughout the season led to losses at competitions throughout the season, notably at the Grand Prix Final. They regained some momentum with a win at the Four Continents Championships over Stellato-Dudek and Deschamps.

Minerva Fabienne Hase and Nikita Volodin of Germany continued to maintain the momentum that had begun the previous season by winning both the Grand Prix Final and the 2025 European Championships. Their only loss of the season had been at the 2024 Cup of China, where mistakes in their short program led to a second-place finish. After a difficult season both personally and professionally, Sara Conti and Niccolò Macii of Italy returned to form throughout the season, winning the 2024 Cup of China and finishing second at the 2024 Grand Prix de France.

=== Ice dance ===
Lilah Fear and Lewis Gibson of Great Britain were the only ice dance team to win two Grand Prix events this season – the 2024 Skate America and the 2024 Finlandia Trophy – although they finished in third place at the 2025 European Championships. Jayne Torvill and Christopher Dean of Great Britain, four-time World Champions in ice dance, voiced their support for Fear and Gibson, with Torvill noting that "they have taken ice dancing in Great Britain to another level". Dean was confident that momentum was on their side, stating, "there's the word of mouth around the events, the judges, the panel, the public perception of them, how the audience react – it does influence."

The reigning silver medalists, Piper Gilles and Paul Poirier of Canada, had had a disappointing Grand Prix season; although they won the 2024 Skate Canada International, they had lost at the 2024 Finlandia Trophy to Fear and Gibson. Their struggles continued at the Grand Prix Final, where they finished in fifth place after a fall in the rhythm dance. Their momentum had shifted by February, when they won the 2025 Four Continents Championships.

Madison Chock and Evan Bates of the United States had also had an inconsistent season, losing to Fear and Gibson at the 2024 Skate America and to Gillies and Poirier at the 2025 Four Continents Championships. Additionally, their "Tour of the Decades"-themed rhythm dance had undergone multiple changes throughout the season. Despite these setbacks, they had won the Grand Prix Final in December, as well as the 2024 NHK Trophy.

The reigning bronze medalists, Charlène Guignard and Marco Fabbri of Italy, had the most polarizing free dance of the season, where the two portrayed robots. Despite the negative feedback to their robot program, Guignard and Fabbri won the 2024 Cup of China and the 2025 European Championships. Acknowledging the criticisms they had received about their routine from both fans and judges, Fabbri stated, "We don't want to be remembered as a couple who can only do one type of thing... We've changed styles several times. That's how we want people to remember us."

== Qualification ==
The number of entries from each nation for the 2025 World Championships was based on the results of the 2024 World Championships. These nations were eligible to enter more than one skater or team in the indicated disciplines. Skaters from Russia and Belarus were banned from participating "until further notice" due to the 2022 Russian invasion of Ukraine.

Number of entries per discipline
Spots	Men	Women	Pairs	Ice dance
3	Japan; United States	Japan; South Korea; United States	Canada; Germany; Japan	Canada; United States
2	France; Italy; Latvia; Switzerland; South Korea	Belgium; Switzerland	Australia; Georgia; Hungary; Italy; United States	Czech Republic; Finland; France; Great Britain; Italy; Lithuania

== Changes to preliminary entries ==
The International Skating Union published the initial list of entrants on February 26, 2025.

Changes to preliminary entries
Date	Discipline	Withdrew	Added	Reason	Ref.
March 11	Ice dance	(Lithuania); Paulina Ramanauskaitė; Deividas Kizala	—N/a	Injury (Kizala)	
March 14	Ice dance	(Israel); Shira Ichilov; Dmytriy Kravchenko	(Israel); Elizabeth Tkachenko; Alexei Kiliakov	—N/a	
March 18	Men	(Israel); Mark Gorodnitsky	(Israel); Lev Vinokur	—N/a	

== Required performance elements ==
=== Single skating ===
Women competing in single skating first performed their short programs on Wednesday, March 26, while men performed theirs on Thursday, March 27. Lasting no more than 2 minutes 40 seconds, the short program had to include the following elements:

For men: one double or triple Axel; one triple or quadruple jump; one jump combination consisting of a double jump and a triple jump, two triple jumps, or a quadruple jump and a double jump or triple jump; one flying spin; one camel spin or sit spin with a change of foot; one spin combination with a change of foot; and a step sequence using the full ice surface.

For women: one double or triple Axel; one triple jump; one jump combination consisting of a double jump and a triple jump, or two triple jumps; one flying spin; one layback spin, sideways leaning spin, camel spin, or sit spin without a change of foot; one spin combination with a change of foot; and one step sequence using the full ice surface.

The top 24 skaters after completion of their short programs moved on to the free skating component. Women performed their free skates on Friday, March 28, while men performed theirs on Sunday, March 30. The free skate performance for both men and women could last no more than 4 minutes, and had to include the following: seven jump elements, of which one had to be an Axel-type jump; three spins, of which one had to be a spin combination, one had to be a flying spin, and one had to be a spin with only one position; a step sequence; and a choreographic sequence.

=== Pair skating ===
Couples competing in pair skating also first performed their short programs on Wednesday, March 26. Lasting no more than 2 minutes 40 seconds, the short program had to include the following elements: one pair lift, one double or triple twist lift, one double or triple throw jump, one double or triple solo jump, one solo spin combination with a change of foot, one death spiral, and a step sequence using the full ice surface.

The top 20 couples after completion of their short programs moved on to the free skates, which were performed on Thursday, March 27. The free skate performance could last no more than 4 minutes, and had to include the following: three pair lifts, of which one had to be a twist lift; two different throw jumps; one solo jump; one jump combination or sequence; one pair spin combination; one death spiral; and a choreographic sequence.

=== Ice dance ===
Couples competing in ice dance performed their rhythm dances on Friday, March 28. Lasting no more than 2 minutes 50 seconds, the theme of the rhythm dance this season was "social dances and styles of the 1950s, 1960s, and 1970s". Examples of applicable dance styles included Rock and Roll, the jitterbug, the twist, the Hustle, and disco. The rhythm dance had to include the following elements: one pattern dance step sequence, one choreographic rhythm sequence, one dance lift, one set of sequential twizzles, and one step sequence while not touching.

The top 20 couples after the rhythm dance moved on to the free dance, which was held on Saturday, March 29. The free dance performance could last no longer than 4 minutes, and had to include the following: three dance lifts or one dance lift and one combination lift, one dance spin, one set of synchronized twizzles, one step sequence in hold, one step sequence while on one skate and not touching, and three choreographic elements.

== Judging ==
For the 2024–25 season, all of the technical elements in any figure skating performance – such as jumps and spins – were assigned a predetermined base point value and were then scored by a panel of seven or nine judges on a scale from -5 to 5 based on their quality of execution. The judging panel's Grade of Execution (GOE) was determined by calculating the trimmed mean (that is, an average after deleting the highest and lowest scores), and this GOE was added to the base value to come up with the final score for each element. The panel's scores for all elements were added together to generate a total element score. At the same time, judges evaluated each performance based on three program components – skating skills, presentation, and composition – and assigned a score from .25 to 10 in .25 point increments. The judging panel's final score for each program component was also determined by calculating the trimmed mean. Those scores were then multiplied by the factor shown on the following chart; the results were added together to generate a total program component score.

Program component factoring
Discipline	Short program or Rhythm dance	Free skate or Free dance
Men	1.67	3.33
Women	1.33	2.67
Pairs	1.33	2.67
Ice dance	1.33	2.00

Deductions were applied for certain violations like time infractions, stops and restarts, or falls. The total element score and total program component score were added together, minus any deductions, to generate a final performance score for each skater or team.

== Medal summary ==
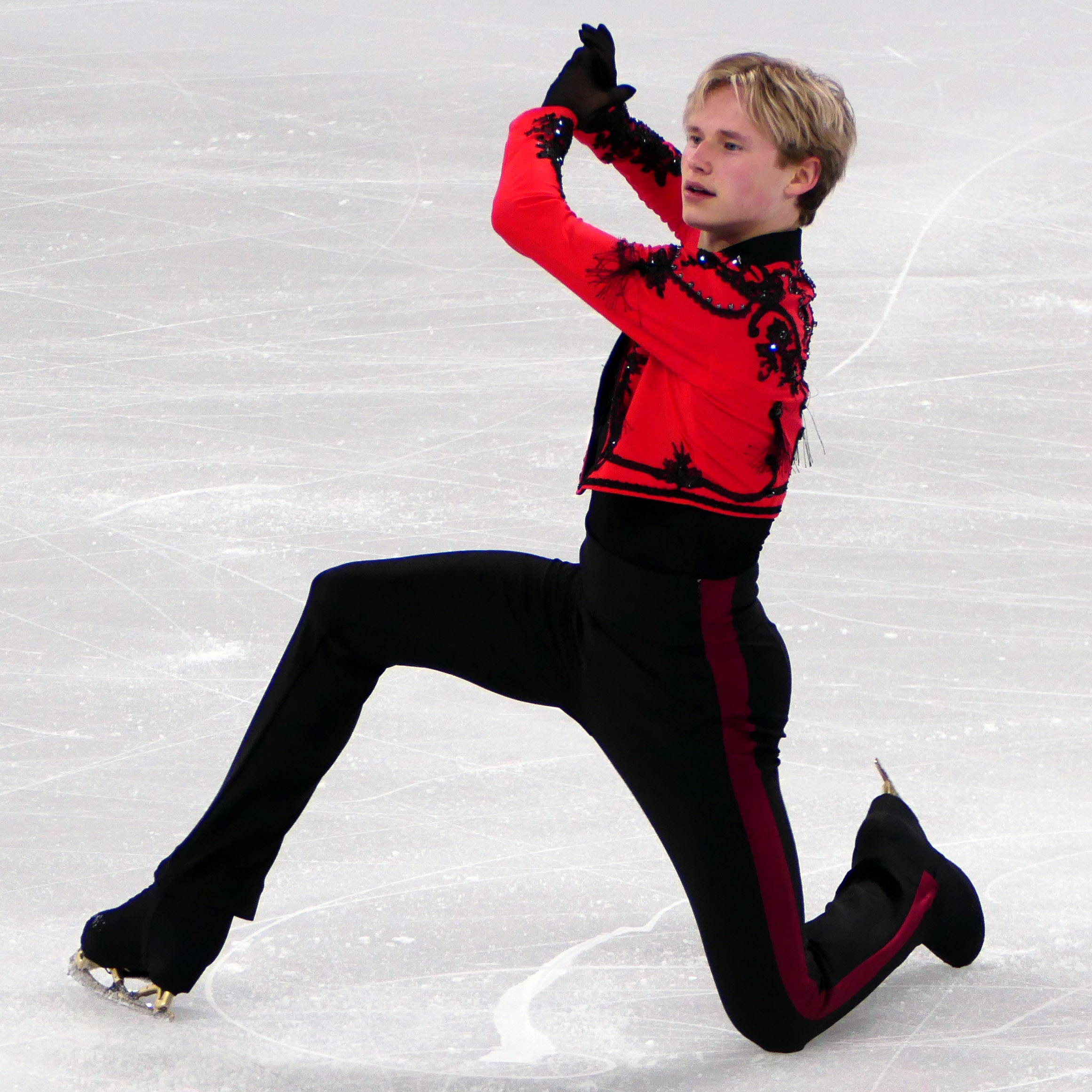
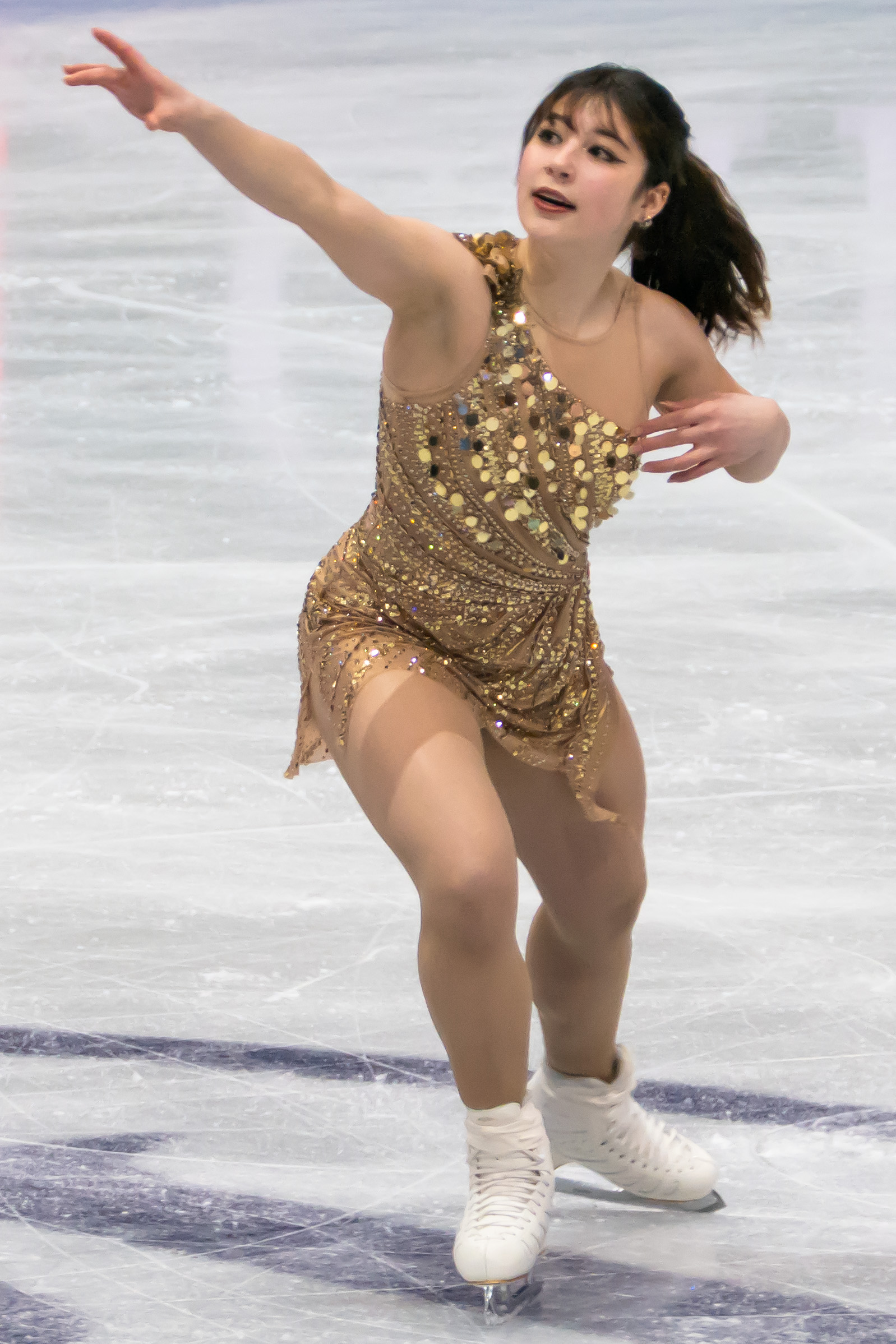
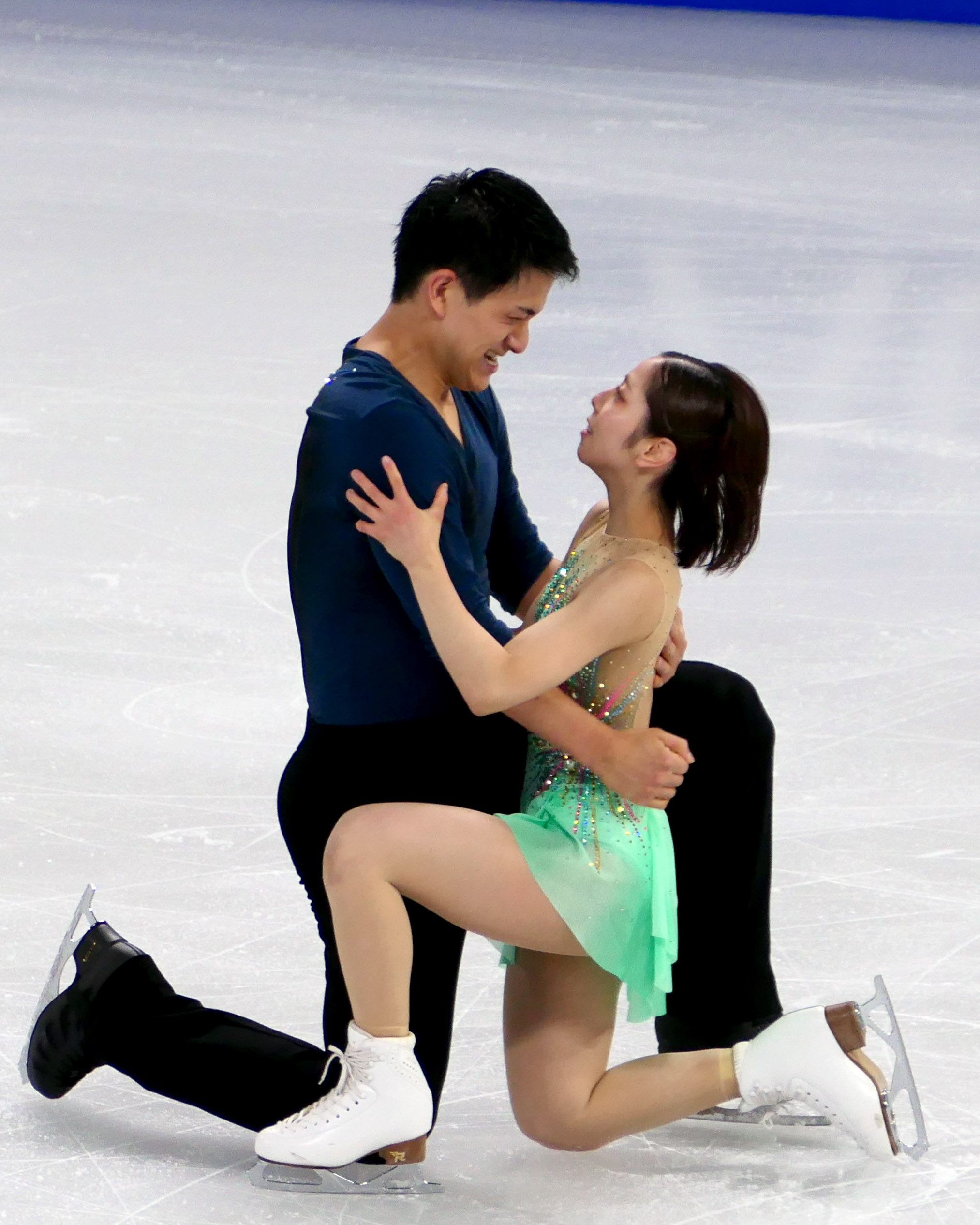
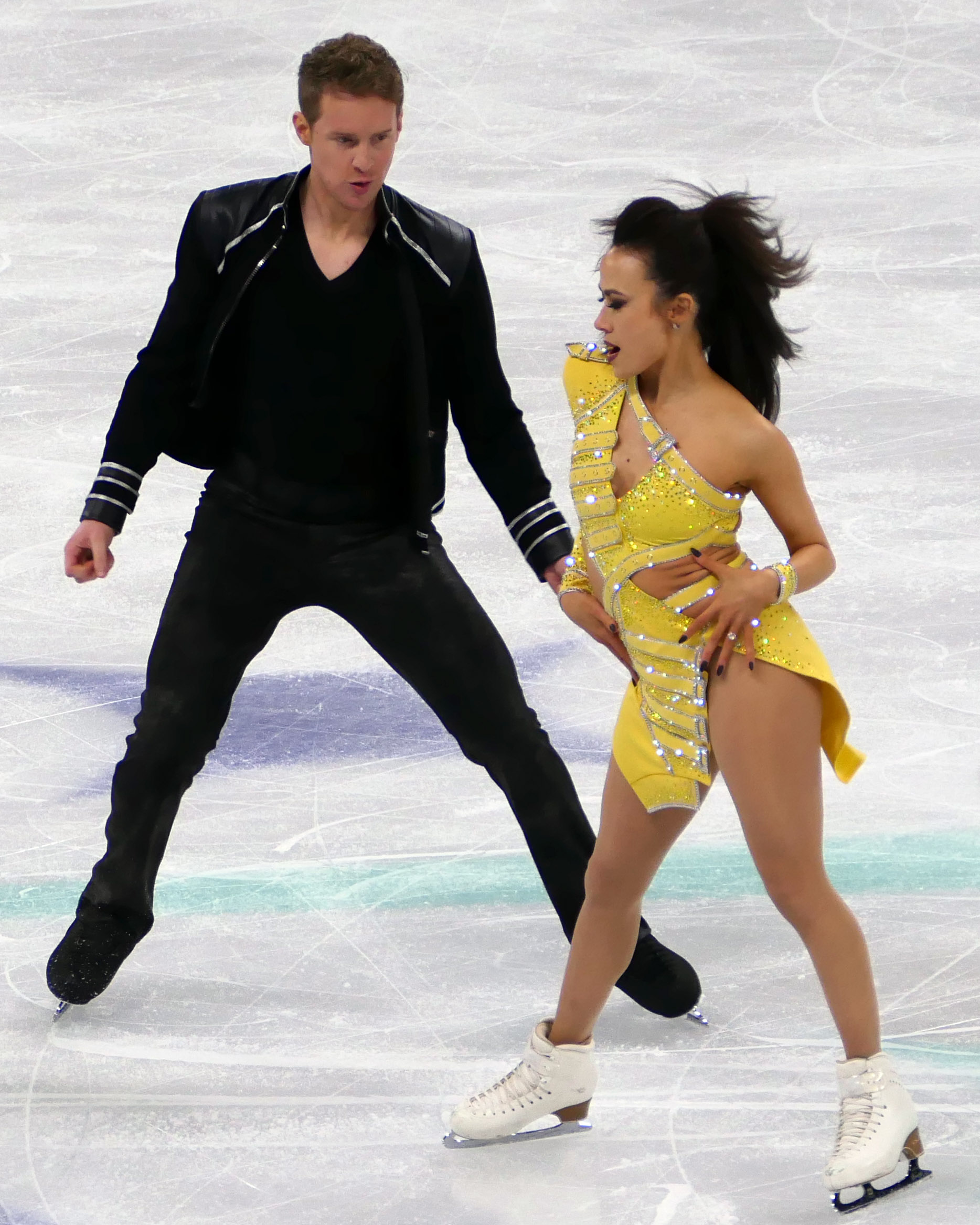
The 2025 World Champions (from left to right):
Ilia Malinin of the United States (men's singles); Alysa Liu of the United States (women's singles); Riku Miura and Ryuichi Kihara of Japan (pair skating); and Madison Chock and Evan Bates of the United States (ice dance)

=== Medalists ===
Medals were awarded to the skaters or teams who achieved the highest overall placements in each discipline.

Medal recipients
Discipline	Gold	Silver	Bronze
Men	(United States); Ilia Malinin	(Kazakhstan); Mikhail Shaidorov	(Japan); Yuma Kagiyama
Women	(United States); Alysa Liu	(Japan); Kaori Sakamoto	(Japan); Mone Chiba
Pairs	(Japan); Riku Miura; Ryuichi Kihara	(Germany); Minerva Fabienne Hase; Nikita Volodin	(Italy); Sara Conti; Niccolò Macii
Ice dance	(United States); Madison Chock; Evan Bates	(Canada); Piper Gilles; Paul Poirier	(United Kingdom); Lilah Fear; Lewis Gibson

Small medals were awarded to the skaters or teams who achieved the highest short program or rhythm dance placements in each discipline.

Small medal recipients for highest short program or rhythm dance
Discipline	Gold	Silver	Bronze
Men	(United States); Ilia Malinin	(Japan); Yuma Kagiyama	(Kazakhstan); Mikhail Shaidorov
Women	(United States); Alysa Liu	(Japan); Mone Chiba	(United States); Isabeau Levito
Pairs	(Japan); Riku Miura; Ryuichi Kihara	(Italy); Sara Conti; Niccolò Macii	(Germany); Minerva Fabienne Hase; Nikita Volodin
Ice dance	(United States); Madison Chock; Evan Bates	(Canada); Piper Gilles; Paul Poirier	(United Kingdom); Lilah Fear; Lewis Gibson

Small medals were awarded to the skaters or teams who achieved the highest free skate or free dance placements in each discipline.

Small medal recipients for highest free skate or free dance
Discipline	Gold	Silver	Bronze
Men	(United States); Ilia Malinin	(Kazakhstan); Mikhail Shaidorov	(France); Adam Siao Him Fa
Women	(United States); Alysa Liu	(Japan); Kaori Sakamoto	(Japan); Mone Chiba
Pairs	(Germany); Minerva Fabienne Hase; Nikita Volodin	(Japan); Riku Miura; Ryuichi Kihara	(Italy); Sara Conti; Niccolò Macii
Ice dance	(United States); Madison Chock; Evan Bates	(Canada); Piper Gilles; Paul Poirier	(Spain); Olivia Smart; Tim Dieck

=== Medals by country ===
Table of medals for overall placement:

Rank	Nation	Gold	Silver	Bronze	Total
1	United States	3	0	0	3
2	Japan	1	1	2	4
3	Canada	0	1	0	1
3	Germany	0	1	0	1
3	Kazakhstan	0	1	0	1
6	Great Britain	0	0	1	1
6	Italy	0	0	1	1
Totals (7 entries)		4	4	4	12

== Results ==
=== Men's singles ===
Ilia Malinin won his second world title in dominant fashion. His short program became the highest scoring of his career, and featured a quadruple flip and a quadruple Lutz-triple toe loop jump combination. Malinin mentioned that he had been uncharacteristically nervous before skating, but he said that "Once the music came on, I just got into a flow state and it really just went from there". His free skate featured all six jumps – toe loop, Salchow, loop, flip, Lutz, and Axel – as quadruples, plus his signature aerial twist (nicknamed the "raspberry twist"). His 31.09-point margin over silver medalist Mikhail Shaidorov was the second largest margin of victory in the men's discipline, after Nathan Chen's 47.63-point victory in 2018. When asked about his victory after his free skate, Malinin replied, "Getting here, I wanted to give it my all and fight for every element. I feel like I did that. It's really inspiring to do this in front of the home crowd."

Mikhail Shaidorov of Kazakhstan won the silver medal, the first medal in the men's event for a Kazakh skater since Denis Ten in 2015. He sat in third place after his short program, more than 15 points behind Malinin. A personal best in his free skate, which included four quadruple jumps, moved him up to second place overall. When asked about his season overall, Shaidorov replied, "If someone had asked me at the beginning of the season that I would be on the world podium, I never would have believed it."

Yuma Kagiyama scored one point behind his personal best in the short program, just over three points behind Malinin. However, after the 2024 World Championships, he felt that Malinin was "invincible", and that even if he performed at his best, his efforts would still not be enough. Kagiyama stated: "I feel like his skating and his artistry, his expression is getting better year by year. So I'm starting to think he's invincible." A fall on his quadruple Salchow, as well as a flawed triple Axel, dropped him to tenth place in the free skate, but he finished overall with the bronze medal.

Adam Siao Him Fa of France did not have the short program he had hoped for when a fall on his quadruple Lutz-triple toe loop jump combination left him in ninth place. Siao Him Fa became the first skater to perform a legal backflip at the World Championships since 1976, as the ban on backflips in competition had been overturned in 2024. Ilia Malinin also performed a backflip as part of his free skate later in the competition.

Men's results
Rank	Skater	Nation	Total	SP		FS	
1st place, gold medalist(s)	Ilia Malinin	United States	318.56	1	110.41	1	208.15
2nd place, silver medalist(s)	Mikhail Shaidorov	Kazakhstan	287.47	3	94.77	2	192.70
3rd place, bronze medalist(s)	Yuma Kagiyama	Japan	278.19	2	107.09	10	171.10
4	Adam Siao Him Fa	France	275.48	9	87.22	3	188.26
5	Kévin Aymoz	France	272.52	4	93.63	7	178.89
6	Shun Sato	Japan	270.56	5	91.26	6	179.30
7	Cha Jun-hwan	South Korea	265.74	10	86.41	5	179.33
8	Jason Brown	United States	265.40	12	84.72	4	180.68
9	Nika Egadze	Georgia	263.03	6	90.39	8	172.64
10	Nikolaj Memola	Italy	255.13	7	87.89	11	167.24
11	Deniss Vasiļjevs	Latvia	252.26	16	79.99	9	172.27
12	Lukas Britschgi	Switzerland	244.19	11	85.83	14	158.36
13	Daniel Grassl	Italy	242.31	14	80.47	12	161.84
14	Roman Sadovsky	Canada	240.38	15	80.25	13	160.13
15	Vladimir Litvintsev	Azerbaijan	233.31	13	83.10	17	150.21
16	Adam Hagara	Slovakia	232.62	18	78.33	15	154.29
17	Andreas Nordebäck	Sweden	229.85	17	79.03	16	150.82
18	Dai Daiwei	China	221.20	21	75.02	18	146.18
19	Mihhail Selevko	Estonia	218.02	19	77.50	21	140.52
20	Tomàs-Llorenç Guarino Sabaté	Spain	217.48	22	74.89	20	142.59
21	Tatsuya Tsuboi	Japan	216.26	24	73.00	19	143.26
22	Andrew Torgashev	United States	212.79	8	87.27	23	125.52
23	Vladimir Samoilov	Poland	211.68	20	75.73	22	135.95
24	Fedirs Kuļišs	Latvia	198.33	23	73.25	24	125.08
25	Lev Vinokur	Israel	72.84	25	72.84	Did not advance to free skate	
26	Kim Hyun-gyeom	South Korea	72.82	26	72.82	Did not advance to free skate	
27	Donovan Carrillo	Mexico	71.55	27	71.55	Did not advance to free skate	
28	Nikita Starostin	Germany	70.72	28	70.72	Did not advance to free skate	
29	Aleksandr Vlasenko	Hungary	70.25	29	70.25	Did not advance to free skate	
30	Li Yu-Hsiang	Chinese Taipei	69.63	30	69.63	Did not advance to free skate	
31	Georgii Reshtenko	Czech Republic	68.61	31	68.61	Did not advance to free skate	
32	Edward Appleby	Great Britain	66.70	32	66.70	Did not advance to free skate	
33	Kyrylo Marsak	Ukraine	64.37	33	64.37	Did not advance to free skate	
34	Jari Kessler	Croatia	61.44	34	61.44	Did not advance to free skate	
35	Maurizio Zandron	Austria	60.87	35	60.87	Did not advance to free skate	
36	Alexander Zlatkov	Bulgaria	55.28	36	55.28	Did not advance to free skate	
37	Semen Daniliants	Armenia	50.58	37	50.58	Did not advance to free skate	
38	Burak Demirboğa	Turkey	48.45	38	48.45	Did not advance to free skate	
39	Davide Lewton Brain	Monaco	47.90	39	47.90	Did not advance to free skate	

=== Women's singles ===
Alysa Liu of the United States shocked the audience by winning her first World Championship title, adding to her bronze medal from 2022, and became the first American woman to win a World Championship since Kimmie Meissner in 2006. Liu set a new personal best score in the short program. Her free skate to Donna Summer's "MacArthur Park" received a standing ovation from the audience and set another personal best score, with a shocked Liu exclaiming "What the hell?" as she finished her program and received her scores. About her win after returning from a two-year retirement, Liu stated, "I'm not going to lie, this is an insane story. I don't know how I came back to be World Champion".

After a mistake on her combination jump, Kaori Sakamoto of Japan was in fifth place after the short program. Her free skate also received a standing ovation from the crowd, and Sakamoto finished overall with the silver medal. Sakamoto had nothing but praise for Liu after the event, saying how happy she was to see her competing again: "She went away, and now she's back and the World Champion. I wouldn't say she's changed. Her cheerfulness and kindness and the way she's always happy brought her to the top step of the podium." Speaking to Japanese media, Sakamoto, although happy with her skate, also said she was frustrated that her performance was not enough, with an under-rotation call on her triple flip-triple toe loop combination jump being the difference between gold and silver, but also emphasized how happy she was for Liu.

Mone Chiba won the bronze medal, improving on her seventh-place finish from the previous year. Her disco-themed short program received a warm reception from the crowd. Chiba said that she was nervous before the free skate, which led to mistakes, and told Japanese media that "getting on the podium wasn't even in my wildest dreams so I'm super happy".

Isabeau Levito of the United States finished third in the short program, putting to rest any question whether her foot injury was healed or not, although Levito admitted that she was still feeling sore. Her stamina from missing three months of training was not able to fully sustain her free skate, and she dropped to fourth overall after a fall in her triple flip-triple toe loop jump combination and an edge call on her triple Lutz. Amber Glenn, also of the United States, who had been undefeated all season, fell on her triple Axel in the short program and finished the segment in ninth place. Despite this, she placed fifth overall after the free skate; her best ever result at the World Championships.

Women's results
Rank	Skater	Nation	Total	SP		FS	
1st place, gold medalist(s)	Alysa Liu	United States	222.97	1	74.58	1	148.39
2nd place, silver medalist(s)	Kaori Sakamoto	Japan	217.98	5	71.03	2	146.95
3rd place, bronze medalist(s)	Mone Chiba	Japan	215.24	2	73.44	3	141.80
4	Isabeau Levito	United States	209.84	3	73.33	5	136.51
5	Amber Glenn	United States	205.65	9	67.65	4	138.00
6	Wakaba Higuchi	Japan	204.58	4	72.10	6	132.48
7	Nina Pinzarrone	Belgium	199.43	8	67.74	7	131.69
8	Niina Petrõkina	Estonia	196.67	12	65.58	8	131.09
9	Lee Hae-in	South Korea	194.36	7	67.79	10	126.57
10	Kim Chae-yeon	South Korea	194.16	11	65.67	9	128.49
11	Madeline Schizas	Canada	190.79	6	69.18	11	121.61
12	Kimmy Repond	Switzerland	183.33	10	67.42	15	115.91
13	Lara Naki Gutmann	Italy	181.97	14	61.72	12	120.25
14	Sofia Samodelkina	Kazakhstan	181.36	13	63.58	13	117.78
15	Lorine Schild	France	177.90	15	60.59	14	117.31
16	Mariia Seniuk	Israel	167.10	19	56.96	16	110.14
17	Olga Mikutina	Austria	165.82	17	59.63	19	106.19
18	Linnea Ceder	Finland	165.50	20	56.79	17	108.71
19	Julia Sauter	Romania	162.61	16	59.88	20	102.73
20	Ekaterina Kurakova	Poland	162.49	21	55.52	18	106.97
21	Alexandra Feigin	Bulgaria	158.55	18	57.22	21	101.33
22	Kristen Spours	Great Britain	153.75	22	55.10	22	98.65
23	Livia Kaiser	Switzerland	146.90	23	53.68	23	93.22
24	Meda Variakojytė	Lithuania	139.81	24	50.98	24	88.83
25	Nargiz Süleymanova	Azerbaijan	50.97	25	50.97	Did not advance to free skate	
26	Vanesa Šelmeková	Slovakia	49.55	26	49.55	Did not advance to free skate	
27	An Xiangyi	China	47.52	27	47.52	Did not advance to free skate	
28	Anastasiia Gubanova	Georgia	47.31	28	47.31	Did not advance to free skate	
29	Mia Risa Gomez	Norway	46.43	29	46.43	Did not advance to free skate	
30	Sofja Stepčenko	Latvia	45.93	30	45.93	Did not advance to free skate	
31	Yun Ah-sun	South Korea	41.08	31	41.08	Did not advance to free skate	
32	Julija Lovrenčič	Slovenia	40.95	32	40.95	Did not advance to free skate	
33	Anastasia Gozhva	Ukraine	37.54	33	37.54	Did not advance to free skate	

=== Pairs ===
Riku Miura and Ryuichi Kihara of Japan won their second World Championship title. Having established a small lead in the short program, they lost points in their free skate due to stumbles on their side-by-side triple toe loop-double Axel jump combination, but ultimately won the World Championship title by 0.71 points. Miura and Kihara's margin of victory was the second narrowest margin in the history of the pairs event, behind only Aljona Savchenko and Robin Szolkowy of Germany in 2012.

Minerva Fabienne Hase and Nikita Volodin of Germany finished in second place. Placing third in the short program, both of them felt the routine was not their best; they felt they had held back a bit too much, and had not skated as close together as they should have. They produced the highest-scoring free skate of the event, setting a new personal best score. After the free skate, Hase stated, "For one second, we hoped it would be enough, but we did everything in this free skate, and we cannot be ashamed or regret that we held back." After finishing second in the short program, Sara Conti and Niccolò Macii of Italy were able to finish third overall. They had the third-best free skate of the evening, a feat Conti felt was impressive considering they had to follow Hase and Volodin's near-perfect performance.

Defending World Champions, Deanna Stellato-Dudek and Maxime Deschamps of Canada, finished in fifth place overall. After a disappointing seventh-place finish in the short program, their free skate moved them up, with Stellato-Dudek admitting that they had nothing to lose: "We were so far behind after the short program, all we could do was give it our all and that's what we did." Stellato-Dudek also discussed the pressure they felt to defend their world title, stating that "being the returning champion has been so difficult. You're expected to win, you're asked about it every time. It's just been a new learning experience. I think I'm better at the chase, because I love it."

Pairs results
Rank	Team	Nation	Total	SP		FS	
1st place, gold medalist(s)	Riku Miura; Ryuichi Kihara	Japan	219.79	1	76.57	2	143.22
2nd place, silver medalist(s)	Minerva Fabienne Hase; Nikita Volodin	Germany	219.08	3	73.59	1	145.49
3rd place, bronze medalist(s)	Sara Conti; Niccolò Macii	Italy	210.47	2	74.61	3	135.86
4	Anastasiia Metelkina; Luka Berulava	Georgia	202.21	4	71.68	6	130.53
5	Deanna Stellato-Dudek; Maxime Deschamps	Canada	199.76	7	67.32	5	132.44
6	Alisa Efimova; Misha Mitrofanov	United States	199.29	9	63.70	4	135.59
7	Ellie Kam; Daniel O'Shea	United States	195.38	5	68.61	7	126.77
8	Maria Pavlova; Alexei Sviatchenko	Hungary	193.29	6	67.45	8	125.84
9	Anastasia Golubeva; Hektor Giotopoulos Moore	Australia	188.24	8	65.73	9	122.51
10	Ekaterina Geynish; Dmitrii Chigirev	Uzbekistan	183.01	11	62.33	10	120.68
11	Lia Pereira; Trennt Michaud	Canada	179.50	10	63.28	13	116.22
12	Anastasia Vaipan-Law; Luke Digby	Great Britain	178.62	13	61.01	11	117.61
13	Rebecca Ghilardi; Filippo Ambrosini	Italy	174.08	14	60.10	14	113.98
14	Ioulia Chtchetinina; Michał Woźniak	Poland	173.18	19	56.37	12	116.81
15	Daria Danilova; Michel Tsiba	Netherlands	170.81	15	58.77	16	112.04
16	Kelly Ann Laurin; Loucas Éthier	Canada	169.55	12	62.30	18	107.25
17	Sofiia Holichenko; Artem Darenskyi	Ukraine	168.55	17	57.20	17	111.35
18	Annika Hocke; Robert Kunkel	Germany	167.72	20	55.16	15	112.56
19	Milania Väänänen; Filippo Clerici	Finland	155.81	16	57.82	20	97.99
20	Oxana Vouillamoz; Tom Bouvart	Switzerland	155.74	18	56.57	19	99.17
21	Camille Kovalev; Pavel Kovalev	France	54.07	21	54.07	Did not advance to free skate	
22	Yuna Nagaoka; Sumitada Moriguchi	Japan	51.10	22	51.10	Did not advance to free skate	
23	Gabriella Izzo; Luc Maierhofer	Austria	48.20	23	48.20	Did not advance to free skate	

=== Ice dance ===
Madison Chock and Evan Bates of the United States won their third consecutive world title, the first ice dance team to achieve this milestone since Russia's Oksana Grishuk and Evgeni Platov in 1996. After completing their rhythm dance, Chock stated that the performance had been the most fun competitive routine she had ever had. Their jazz-themed free dance was nearly perfect, receiving their only deduction for their choreographic twizzles. After winning the event, Chock stated, "This definitely feels extra special, to do it in front of a home crowd and to have two of our best skates of the season. I don't think we could've done anything better than that."

Piper Gilles and Paul Poirier of Canada finished second in both segments and placed second overall. Poirier stated that the lead that Chock and Bates had created after the rhythm dance would be "tough" to catch. Although disappointed with another silver medal, Gilles said, "We skated with joy, we skated with our hearts. The Olympic Games are coming up and our eyes are still on top of the podium, and silver's a stepping-stone for us."

Lilah Fear and Lewis Gibson of Great Britain, despite finishing sixth in the free skate, held onto their lead over the other teams from the rhythm dance to finish third overall. It was Great Britain's first World Championship medal since 1984. Fear commented, "I can't even describe my feelings, I'm still shaking, I'm in disbelief," with Gibson adding, "It's a dream come true." On joining Torvill and Dean as British ice dance World Championship medalists, Gibson said, "we've been compared to them a lot, and I love it every time. It's such an honor. I was inspired by them, and I hope so much that there are little kids out there in Great Britain seeing this and wanting to put their skates on as well." Despite a great rhythm dance, their free dance was noticeably nervy in the first half with the judges marking them lower than expected on a lift and step sequence.

Charlène Guignard and Marco Fabbri of Italy finished fourth in all segments. Their free dance scored five points below their season's best. Guignard noticed that unlike their competitors, the crowd did not enjoy their free dance, which she said might have affected their scores. Fabbri also stated that they had made mistakes: "It wasn't flawless, but also it didn't feel bad. Still, we were a bit tense today, not that relaxed."

Ice dance results
Rank	Team	Nation	Total	RD		FD	
1st place, gold medalist(s)	Madison Chock; Evan Bates	United States	222.06	1	90.18	1	131.88
2nd place, silver medalist(s)	Piper Gilles; Paul Poirier	Canada	216.54	2	86.44	2	130.10
3rd place, bronze medalist(s)	Lilah Fear; Lewis Gibson	Great Britain	207.11	3	83.86	6	123.25
4	Charlène Guignard; Marco Fabbri	Italy	206.46	4	83.04	4	123.42
5	Christina Carreira; Anthony Ponomarenko	United States	204.88	6	81.51	5	123.37
6	Olivia Smart; Tim Dieck	Spain	200.92	8	77.21	3	123.71
7	Marjorie Lajoie; Zachary Lagha	Canada	200.41	5	81.77	8	118.64
8	Evgeniia Lopareva; Geoffrey Brissaud	France	194.63	9	76.74	9	117.89
9	Caroline Green; Michael Parsons	United States	192.47	7	77.51	11	114.96
10	Diana Davis; Gleb Smolkin	Georgia	190.50	14	73.22	10	117.28
11	Juulia Turkkila; Matthias Versluis	Finland	188.95	20	68.09	7	120.86
12	Kateřina Mrázková; Daniel Mrazek	Czech Republic	187.17	10	74.49	12	112.68
13	Natálie Taschlerová; Filip Taschler	Czech Republic	185.66	13	73.29	13	112.37
14	Yuka Orihara; Juho Pirinen	Finland	184.72	11	73.98	14	110.74
15	Loïcia Demougeot; Théo le Mercier	France	181.51	15	72.62	15	108.89
16	Jennifer Janse van Rensburg; Benjamin Steffan	Germany	179.33	12	73.35	17	105.98
17	Phebe Bekker; James Hernandez	Great Britain	178.35	17	70.98	16	107.37
18	Hannah Lim; Ye Quan	South Korea	177.31	16	72.04	18	105.27
19	Holly Harris; Jason Chan	Australia	174.78	18	69.84	19	104.94
20	Alicia Fabbri; Paul Ayer	Canada	170.88	19	68.95	20	101.93
21	Allison Reed; Saulius Ambrulevičius	Lithuania	68.08	21	68.08	Did not advance to free dance	
22	Utana Yoshida; Masaya Morita	Japan	67.69	22	67.69	Did not advance to free dance	
23	Victoria Manni; Carlo Röthlisberger	Italy	66.57	23	66.57	Did not advance to free dance	
24	Mariia Ignateva; Danijil Leonyidovics Szemko	Hungary	65.09	24	65.09	Did not advance to free dance	
25	Milla Ruud Reitan; Nikolaj Majorov	Sweden	64.98	25	64.98	Did not advance to free dance	
26	Elizabeth Tkachenko; Alexei Kiliakov	Israel	63.64	26	63.64	Did not advance to free dance	
27	Mária Sofia Pucherová; Nikita Lysak	Slovakia	62.32	27	62.32	Did not advance to free dance	
28	Carolane Soucisse; Shane Firus	Ireland	58.68	28	58.68	Did not advance to free dance	
29	Zoe Larson; Andrii Kapran	Ukraine	57.75	29	57.75	Did not advance to free dance	
30	Gina Zehnder; Beda Leon Sieber	Switzerland	57.07	30	57.07	Did not advance to free dance	
31	Ren Junfei; Xing Jianing	China	56.05	31	56.05	Did not advance to free dance	
32	Chelsea Verhaegh; Sherim van Geffen	Netherlands	54.78	32	54.78	Did not advance to free dance	
33	Samantha Ritter; Daniel Brykalov	Azerbaijan	52.30	33	52.30	Did not advance to free dance	
34	Sofiia Dovhal; Wiktor Kulesza	Poland	51.87	34	51.87	Did not advance to free dance	
35	Katarina DelCamp; Berk Akalin	Turkey	50.24	35	50.24	Did not advance to free dance	
36	Angelina Kudryavtseva; Ilia Karankevich	Cyprus	49.63	36	49.63	Did not advance to free dance	

== Qualification for 2026 Winter Olympics ==
The number of entries allotted to each nation for the 2026 Winter Olympics was based on the results of the 2025 World Championships, although nations had the opportunity to earn additional berths at the 2025 Skate to Milano qualifying competition.

Number of allotments per discipline to the 2026 Winter Olympics
Spots	Men	Women	Pairs	Ice dance
3	Japan; United States	Japan; United States	—N/a	Canada; United States
2	France; Italy; Latvia	South Korea; Switzerland	Canada; Germany; Italy; United States	Czech Republic; Finland; France; Great Britain
1	Azerbaijan; Canada; China; Estonia; Georgia; Kazakhstan; Poland; Slovakia; South Korea; Spain; Sweden; Switzerland	Austria; Belgium; Bulgaria; Canada; Estonia; Finland; France; Great Britain; Israel; Italy; Kazakhstan; Lithuania; Poland; Romania	Australia; Georgia; Great Britain; Hungary; Japan; Netherlands; Poland; Uzbekistan	Georgia; Germany; Italy; South Korea; Spain

== Works cited ==
- "Special Regulations & Technical Rules – Single & Pair Skating and Ice Dance 2024" (PDF). International Skating Union. Archived (PDF) from the original on November 9, 2024.
