= Nikita Volodin =

Russian-German pair skater (born 1999)

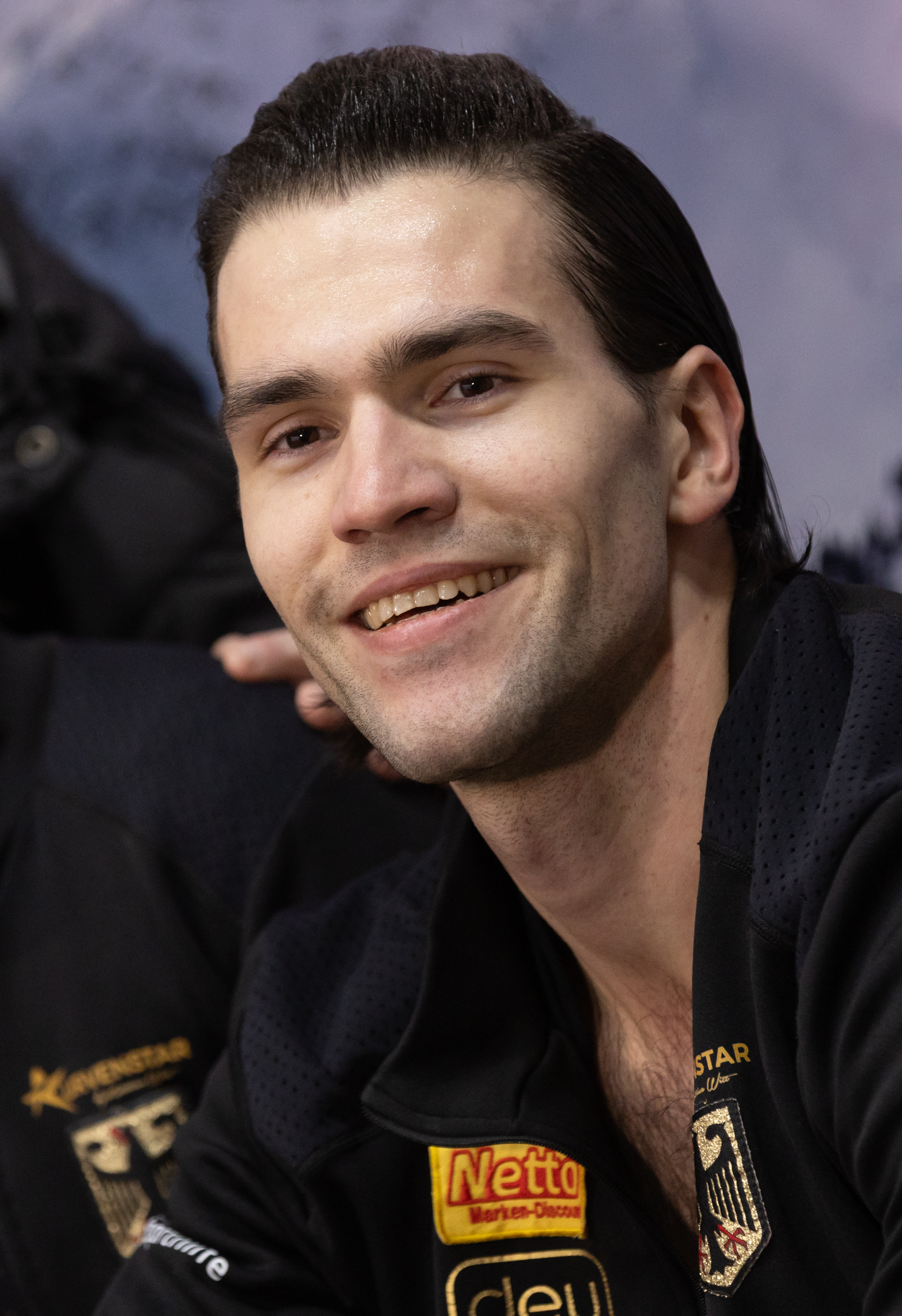
- Volodin at the 2026 German Championships

Personal information
- Native name: Никита Андреевич Володин
- Full name: Nikita Andreyevich Volodin
- Born: 29 June 1999 (age 27) Saint Petersburg, Russia
- Home town: Berlin, Germany
- Height: 1.88 m (6 ft 2 in)

Figure skating career
- Country: Germany (since 2022); Russia (2015–20)
- Discipline: Pair skating
- Partner: Minerva Fabienne Hase (since 2022); Taisiia Sobinina (2019–20); Amina Atakhanova (2018–19); Alina Ustimkina (2014–18)
- Coach: Dmitri Savin; Knut Schubert; Sidnei Brandão; Rico Rex
- Skating club: Berliner Sportverein 92
- Began skating: 2003
- Highest WS: 1st (2025–26)

Medal record
Event	Gold medal – first place	Silver medal – second place	Bronze medal – third place
Olympic Games	0	0	1
World Championships	1	1	1
European Championships	1	1	0
Grand Prix Final	2	0	1
German Championships	2	0	0
Winter Youth Olympics	0	0	1
Medal list
representing Germany
Olympic Games
Bronze medal – third place	2026 Milano Cortina	Pairs
World Championships
Gold medal – first place	2026 Prague	Pairs
Silver medal – second place	2025 Boston	Pairs
Bronze medal – third place	2024 Montreal	Pairs
European Championships
Gold medal – first place	2025 Tallinn	Pairs
Silver medal – second place	2026 Sheffield	Pairs
Grand Prix Final
Gold medal – first place	2023–24 Beijing	Pairs
Gold medal – first place	2024–25 Grenoble	Pairs
Bronze medal – third place	2025–26 Nagoya	Pairs
German Championships
Gold medal – first place	2024 Berlin	Pairs
Gold medal – first place	2025 Oberstdorf	Pairs
Medal list
representing Russia
Winter Youth Olympics
Bronze medal – third place	2016 Lillehammer	Pairs

Nikita Andreyevich Volodin (Russian: Никита Андреевич Володин, German: Nikita Andrejewitsch Wolodin; born 29 June 1999) is a Russian-German pair skater who currently competes for Germany. With his partner, Minerva Fabienne Hase, he is the 2026 Winter Olympic bronze medalist, 2026 World gold medalist, 2025 World silver medalist, the 2024 World bronze medalist, the 2025 European champion, a two-time Grand Prix Final champion (2023–24, 2024–25), a seven-time ISU Grand Prix medalist, a five-time ISU Challenger Series medalist, and a three-time German national champion (2023-25).

With former partner, Alina Ustimkina, they were the 2016 Tallinn Trophy champions and 2016 Youth Olympic bronze medalists.

== Personal life ==
Nikita Andreyevich Volodin was born on 29 June 1999 in Saint Petersburg, Russia. He is able to speak Russian, English, and German.

In September 2025, he became a naturalized German citizen.

== Career ==
Volodin began skating in 2003.

=== Partnership with Alina Ustimkina ===
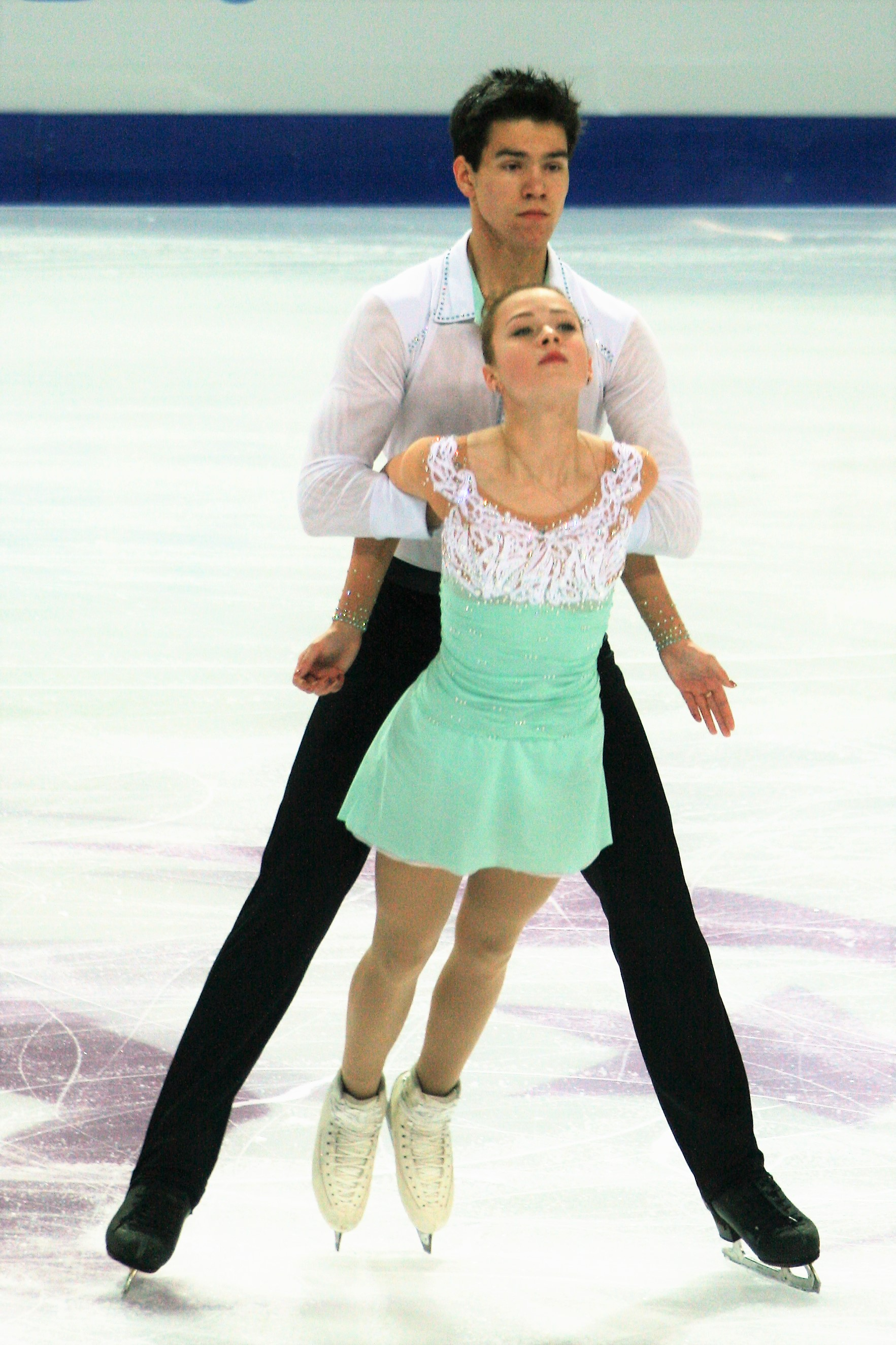
Ustimkina and Volodin at the 2016-17 ISU Junior Grand Prix Final

Volodin and Alina Ustimkina debuted their partnership in September 2014. They competed at events within Russia during their first season together and began appearing internationally in the 2015–16 season. In August 2015, they were sent to Riga, Latvia to compete at their first ISU Junior Grand Prix (JGP) assignment, placing fifth. In November, they won the junior gold medal at the NRW Trophy, outscoring silver medalists Anna Dušková / Martin Bidař by 19.22 points.

In January 2016, Ustimkina/Volodin placed fifth at the Russian Junior Championships. In February, they represented Russia at the 2016 Winter Youth Olympics in Hamar, Norway. Ranked third in both segments, they were awarded the bronze medal behind Ekaterina Borisova / Dmitry Sopot and Dušková/Bidař. Assigned to Team Determination for the mixed NOC team event, Ustimkina/Volodin placed third in their segment and their team finished eighth.

Ustimkina and Volodin ended their partnership in late 2017.

=== Partnership with Amina Atakhanova ===
Volodin and Amina Atakhanova teamed up in early 2018, coached by Alexei Sokolov in Saint Petersburg. In April 2018, they won gold at the Russian Youth Championships Elder Age. Their partnership ended following that season. Following this, Volodin did approach Russian women's singles skater, Evgenia Medvedeva, asking if she was interested in trying to pair skating with him but she declined his offer.

=== Partnership with Minerva Fabienne Hase ===
In June 2022, Volodin was introduced by coach, Dmitri Savin, to German pair skater, Minerva Fabienne Hase, whose long partnership with Nolan Seegert had ended following the 2022 Winter Olympics. Agreeing to skate together and represent her country, they trained through the 2022–23 season while waiting for Volodin to be released by the Figure Skating Federation of Russia. Initially, the pair were unable to communicate due to Volodin being unable to speak German nor English at the time. Savin would thus act as the team's translator until Volodin learned to speak English well enough to interact with Hase.

Volodin was released by the Russian federation in May 2022. It was subsequently announced that the pair would train in Berlin Germany with coaches, Rico Rex and Knut Schubert. In addition, Savin would continue working with the pair by acting as their coach at international competitions.

==== 2023–24 season: World bronze and Grand Prix Final champions ====
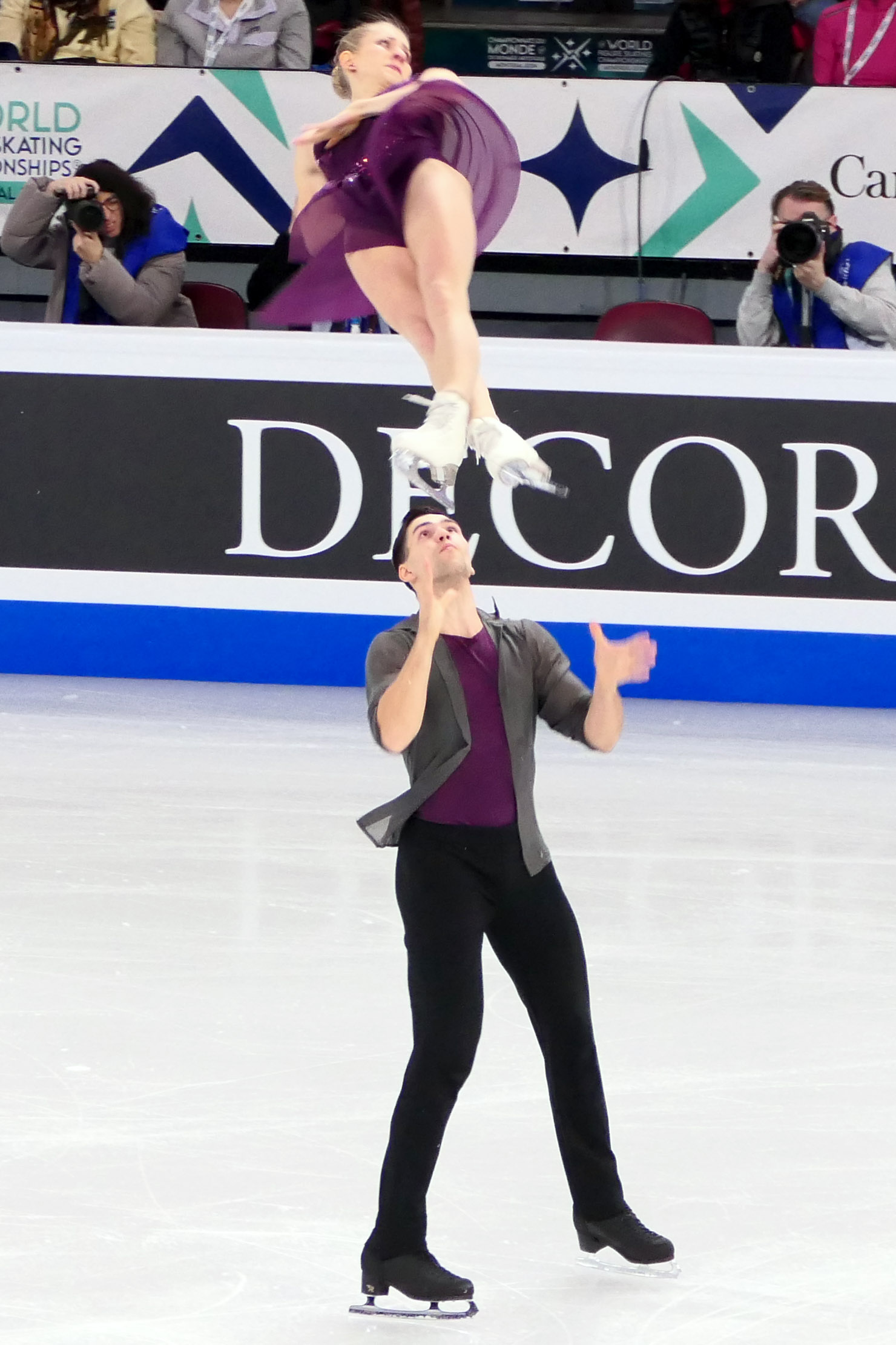
Hase/Volodin performing a split triple twist during their short program at the 2024 World Championships

Hase/Volodin debuted as a team at the 2023 CS Lombardia Trophy, where they won the silver medal behind reigning Italian European champions Conti/Macii, and finishing ahead of domestic rivals Hocke/Kunkel. Hase said it felt "so good to be back and even be on the podium in our first competition." They went on to win a Challenger gold medal on home soil at the 2023 CS Nebelhorn Trophy, after coming back from placing third in the short program.

Hase/Volodin made their senior Grand Prix debut at the 2023 Grand Prix of Espoo. They placed third in the short program behind Shanghai Trophy champions Peng/Wang and Conti/Macii after an error on their throw triple loop, but won the free skate despite jump errors and rose to take the gold medal. Hase admitted that the result felt "very lucky," but that it was "a special moment for both of us." They went on to win the 2023 NHK Trophy as well, improving on all their personal bests in the process and qualifying to the Grand Prix Final as the second seed.

Volodin having become ill following the NHK Trophy, the team was uncertain of their ability to compete. Returning to China for the Final, held in Beijing, they performed their first full run-through since the NHK Trophy in training. Hase/Volodin set a new personal best score to win the short program narrowly over Canadians Stellato-Dudek/Deschamps and Italians Conti/Macii. They finished second in the free skate behind Conti/Macii, but won the gold medal by 0.55 points over the Italian team. Hase said they were "overwhelmed."

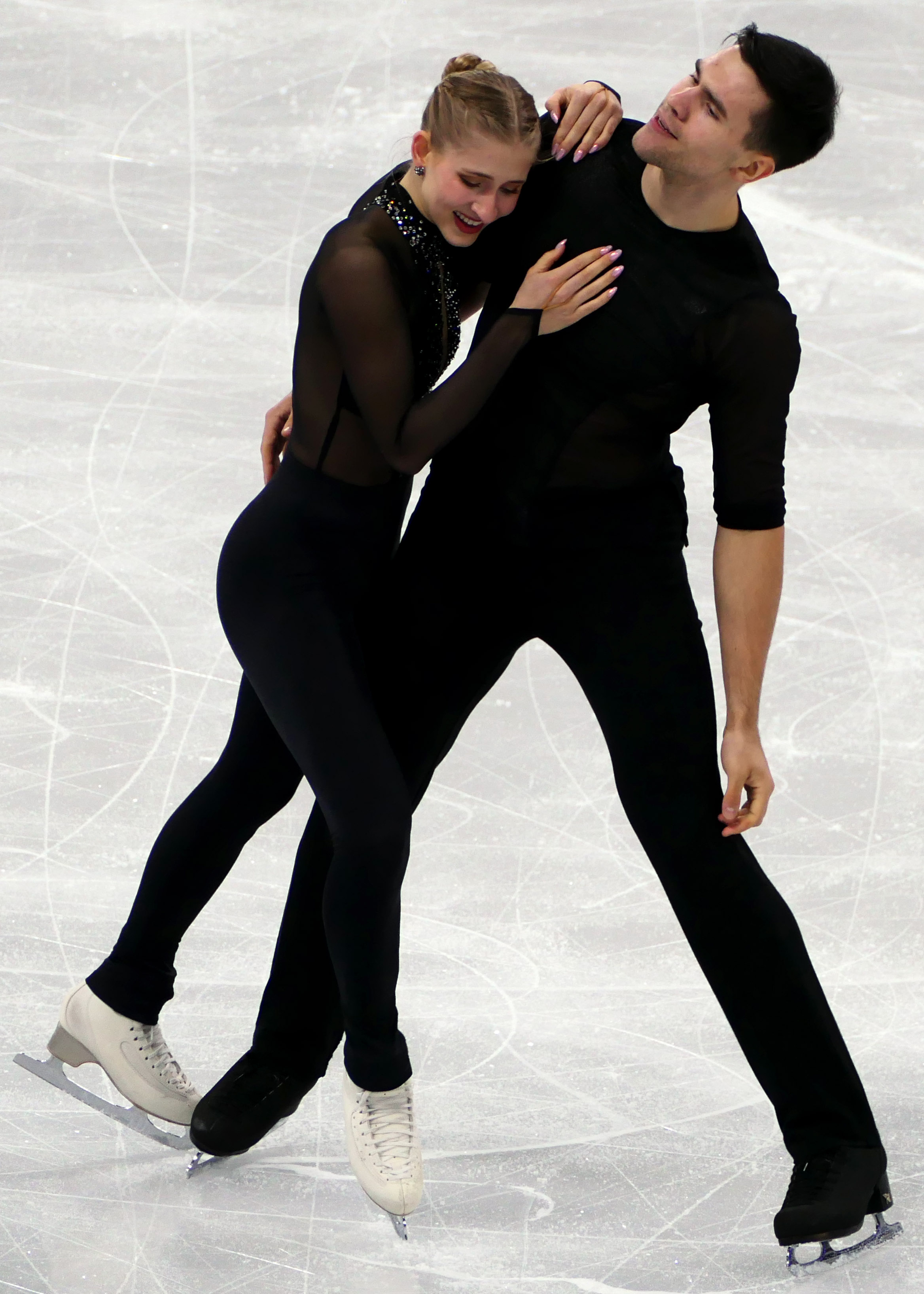
Hase/Volodin during their free skate at the 2024 World Championships

Hase became ill following the German Championships, as a result of which the team had only ten days of training prior to the 2024 European Championships in Kaunas. They entered as perceived favourites, finishing second in the short program. They had an error-riddled free skate, culminating in an aborted lift, that saw them place sixth in the segment and drop to fifth place overall. This was the team's first time missing the podium in competition. Hase said that they "have to appreciate what we have already achieved this season," and vowed that they would get used to the pressure of being the favourites.

Following the disappointment at the European Championships, Hase/Volodin performed in the Art on Ice skating show, which they would later credit with aiding them with performing in front of large audiences. At the 2024 World Championships, they placed fourth in the short program, 0.78 points behind Conti/Macii in third place. Despite Hase making a Salchow error in the free skate, they came third in that segment, and rose to third overall to claim the bronze medal. This was the first World medal for both, and the first for a German skater since Savchenko/Massot's gold medal in 2018. Volodin said that "I can't believe at the moment that I won a medal at the real world championships. Maybe after some time."

==== 2024–25 season: World silver, European champions, and Grand Prix Final champions ====
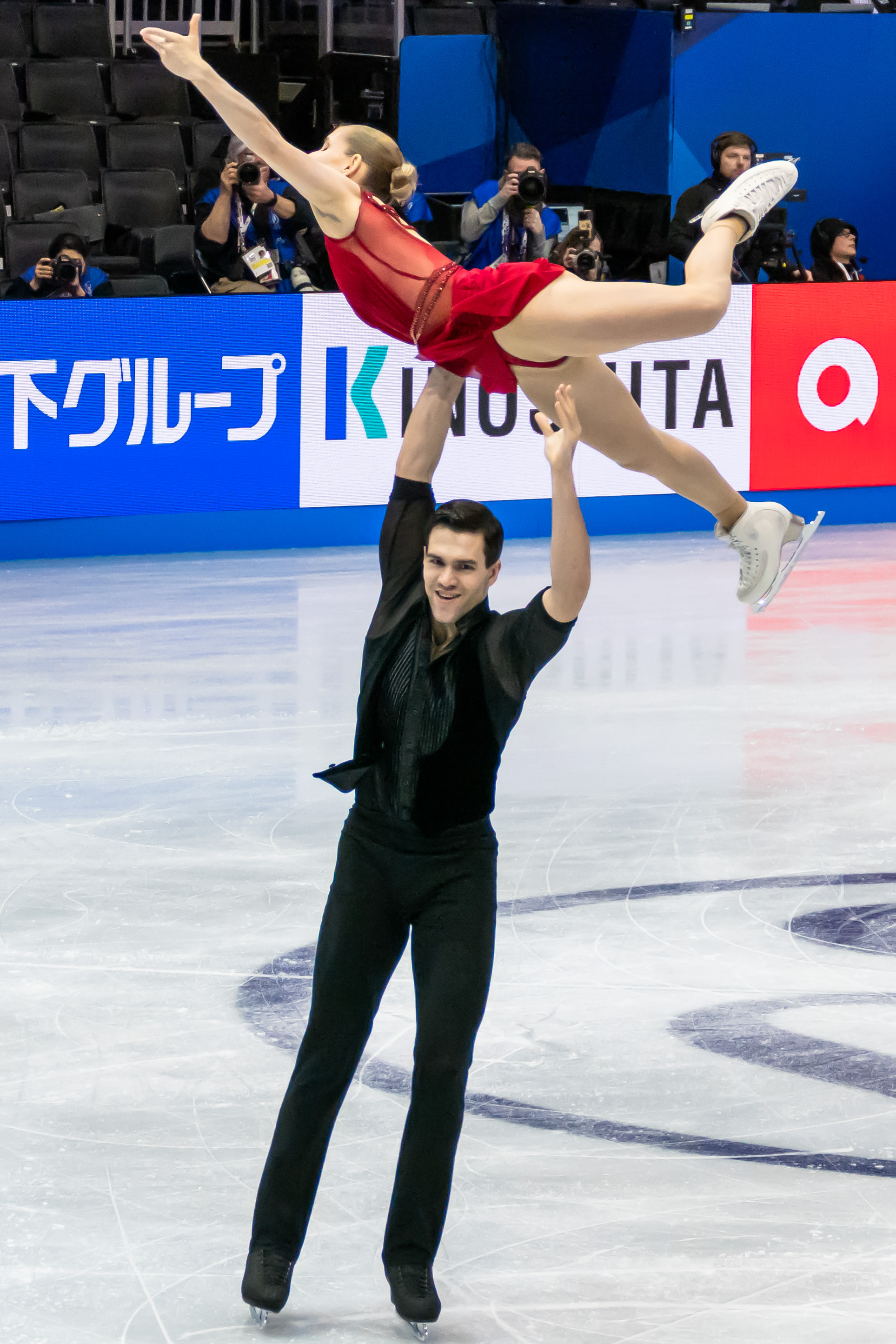
Hase and Volodin performing a lift during their short program at the 2025 World Championships

Hase/Volodin started the season by winning gold at the 2024 CS Nebelhorn Trophy, defeating reigning World Champions, Stellato-Dudek/Deschamps, and scoring personal bests in all competition segments. They went on to compete at the 2024 Trophée Métropole Nice Côte d'Azur, however after completing the short program segment, the senior pairs free skate event was cancelled due to poor weather conditions. Hase/Volodin were awarded the gold medal based on their short program result.

Going on to compete on the 2024–25 Grand Prix circuit, the team won the gold medal at the 2024 Grand Prix de France. Following the event, Hase shared, "We came here knowing it was possible to win. We are glad we could show a good performance again and proved that Nebelhorn Trophy was not a one-hit-wonder. We are glad we could show consistency and the win is of course very nice." Volodin added, "We try not to think too much about the fact that we won the bronze at Worlds last season, this is a new fresh season." Three weeks later, prior to the pairs short program at the 2024 Cup of China, Hase would suffer with food poisoning. Despite this, the pair would go on to complete their short program, finishing second in that segment behind Conti/Macii due to Volodin taking an unexpected fall during the step sequence. The following day, Hase/Volodin would put forth a strong free skate performance, winning that segment of the competition. Hase/Volodin would finish second overall to Conti/Macii. Following the event, Hase said, "We are relieved, really just relieved. This was a hard work, like this program was hard work from beginning to the end. So, I'm really happy with what we did today. I'm just dead. I'm happy it's done now, that I can like chill now a little bit."

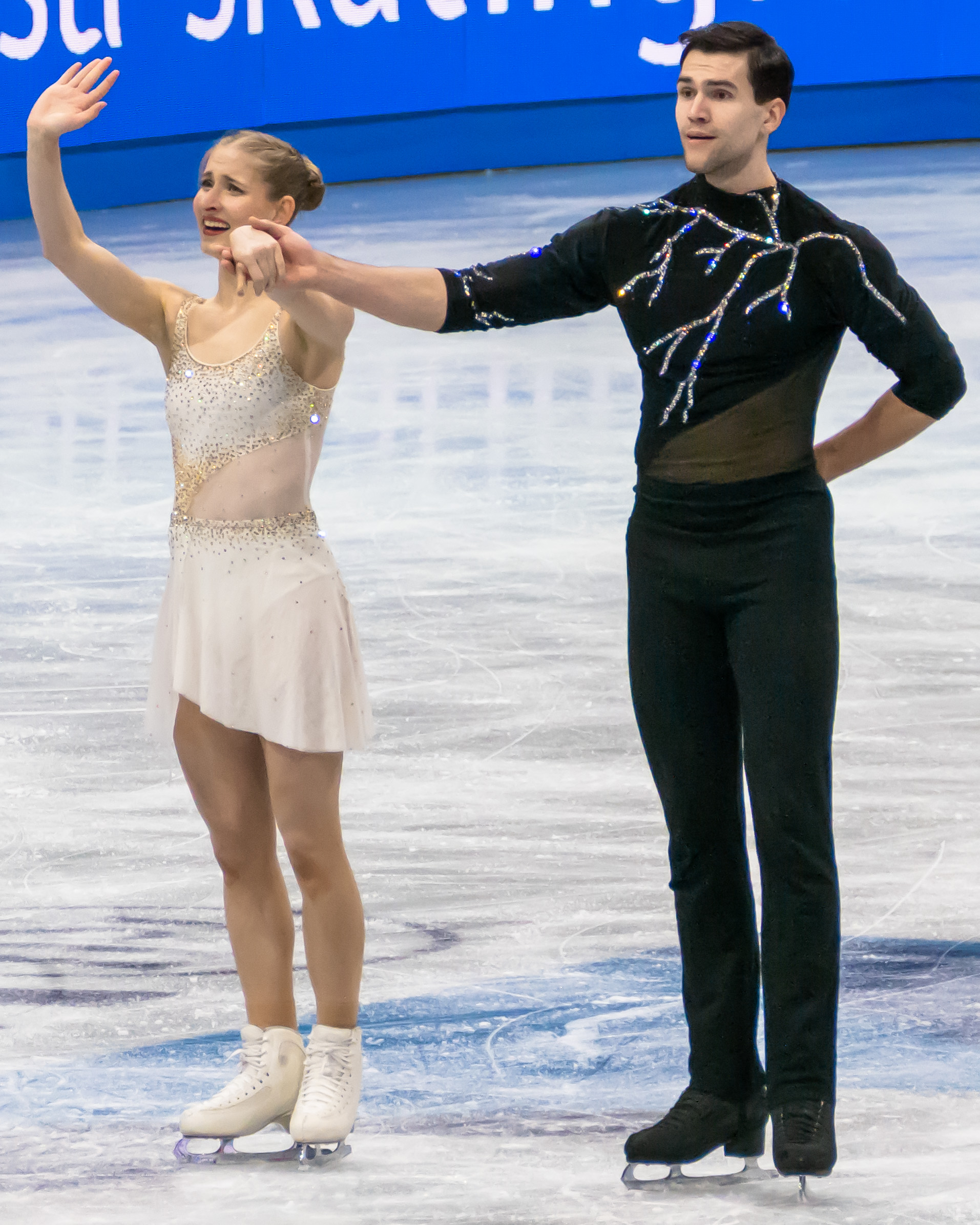
Hase and Volodin after their free skate at the 2025 World Championships

Qualifying for the 2024–25 Grand Prix Final, Hase/Volodin delivered to solid performances in an event that was otherwise riddled with costly errors by the other pair teams, allowing them to win the event for a second consecutive time and by almost twelve points. Following this win, Hase said, "We are incredibly happy. Winning this year was much more difficult than last year. Last year there were no expectations but this year we felt much more pressure." Two weeks later, Hase/Volodin won their second national title at the 2025 German Championships.

Going on to compete at the 2025 European Championships in Tallinn, Estonia, Hase/Volodin skated two clean programs, winning both the short and free program segments, and winning the gold medal overall. Following the event, Hase shared, "It feels incredible to be European champion. The moment we realized it was actually just when the scores came up because we saw that Sara and Niccolo also celebrated after their skate, so we knew that they had had a good skate. We weren’t sure until the last moment that it had been enough. We knew there was still a chance even after this mistake, but we weren’t sure until the very end. This victory shows that all of our hard work paid off—every sweat drop, every training session was worth it, and it’s an incredible feeling."

The following month, Hase/Volodin competed at the 2025 World Championships in Boston, Massachusetts, United States. After placing third in the short program, they managed to deliver a personal best free skate performance despite losing a level on their final lift. Despite winning the latter segment of the competition, Miura/Kihara's lead following the short program was enough for them to remain in first place overall, resulting in Hase/Volodin winning the silver medal. In an interview following their free skate, Hase shared,"When you are done everything comes out. It was the best skate of the season. We did everything we could in that skate. We feel good and very happy. Now the season is done. It was the last performance for us and it was very important."

==== 2025–26 season: Milano Cortina Olympic bronze, World champions, European silver, and Grand Prix Final bronze ====
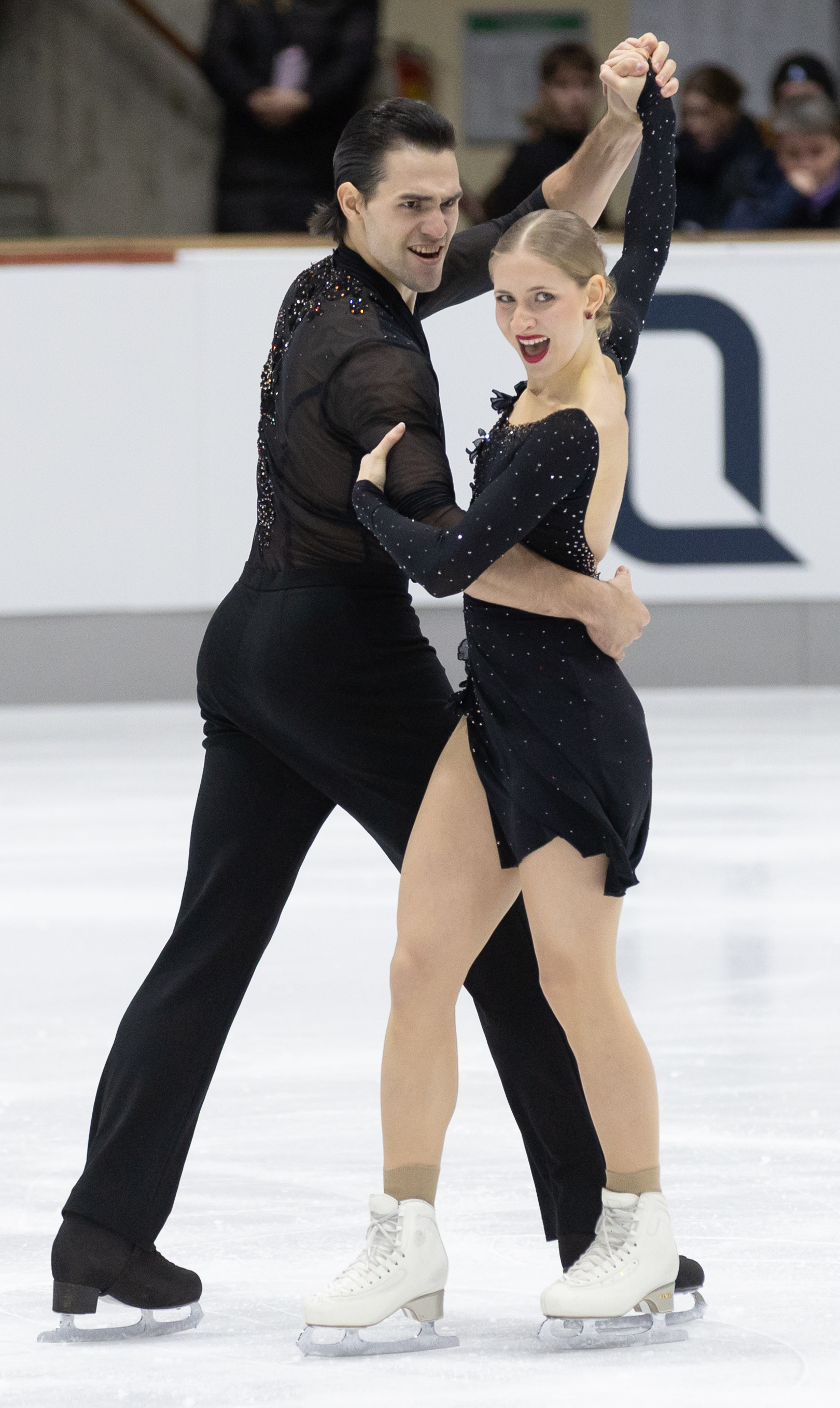
Hase and Volodin during their short program at the 2026 German Championships

Hase and Volodin opened their season at 2025 CS Nebelhorn Trophy where they won their third consecutive gold medal. The following month, they took silver at 2025 CS Trialeti Trophy earning their fifth ISU Challenger Series medal.

Three weeks later, Hase and Volodin competed at 2025 Skate Canada International. They placed first in the short program, but had two falls in the free skate and subsequently finished second overall. “We’re not quite happy with the performance,” said Hase. “There were two big mistakes, but the rest of the elements, besides the mistakes we were really happy with."

Hase and Volodin competed next at 2025 Finlandia Trophy where they won the gold, qualifying for the 2025-26 Grand Prix Final. "For the Final, we want to show even more emotions in both programs," said Volodin. "We were very nervous and made more mistakes at our last competition. In this Final, we want to skate with even more confidence."

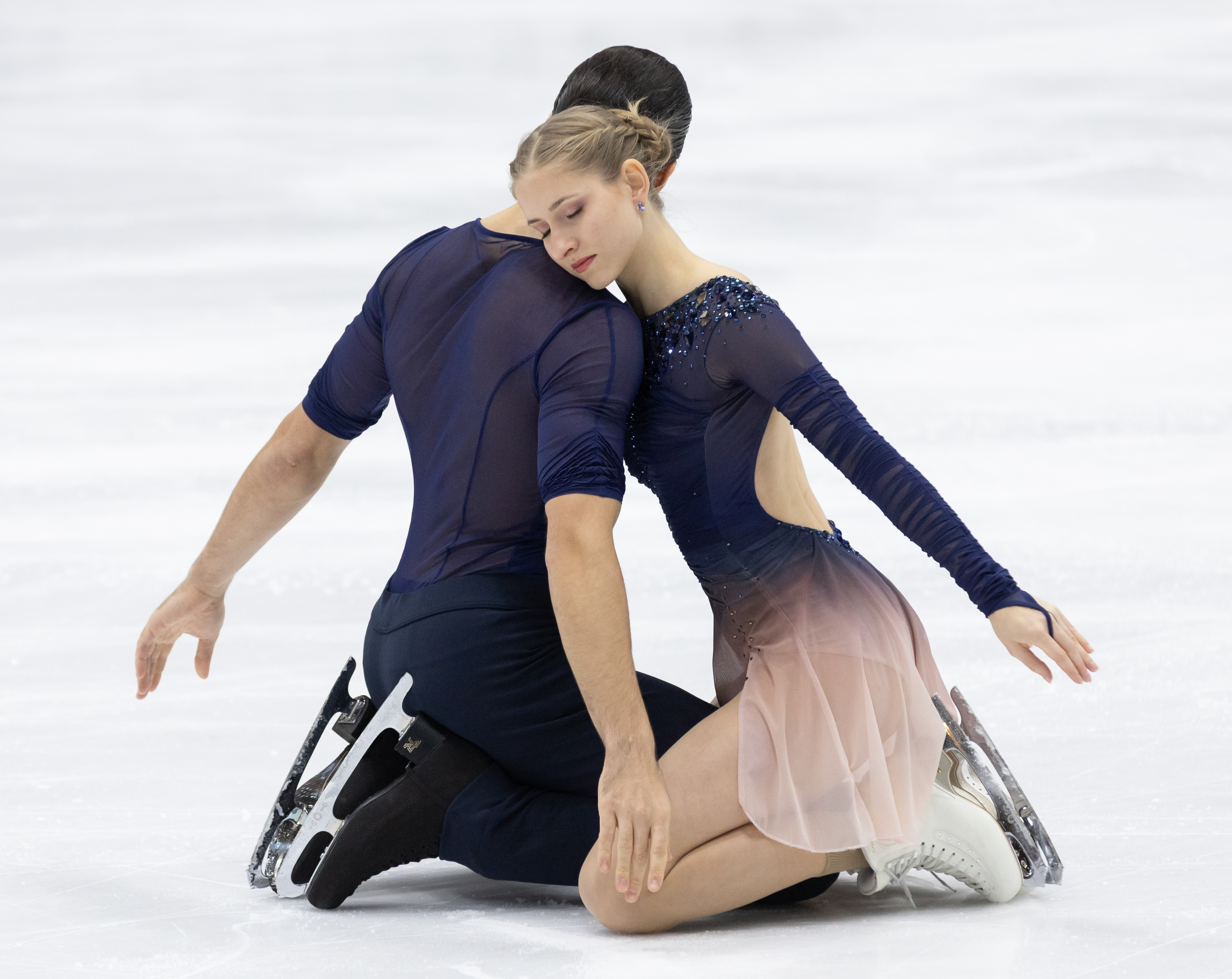
Hase and Volodin doing their opening free skate pose at the 2026 German Championships

The following month, Hase and Volodin competed at the 2025–26 Grand Prix Final where they finished fifth in the short program and first in the free skate with a new personal best. They took third place overall. "We were hoping for the whole season for a free program like that!" said Hase. "Last year it was a little bit easier for us to get a clean free, and this year we had many good shorts, but the free always had some mistakes." One week later, the pair won their third consecutive national title at the 2026 German Championships.

In January, Hase/Volodin won the silver medal at the 2026 European Championships. "I think now we got a lot of motivation and energy to go back to practice," said Hase after the free skate. "And in three weeks, everything will hopefully come into place, and we can hopefully show our full potential." Speaking on the upcoming Olympics, Hase stated, "It's going to get down to who has the best nerves in both programs and who's going to be the most clean. We're all very strong teams. I think the past years of the Olympics, it was never like this, such a range of teams that can make the podium."

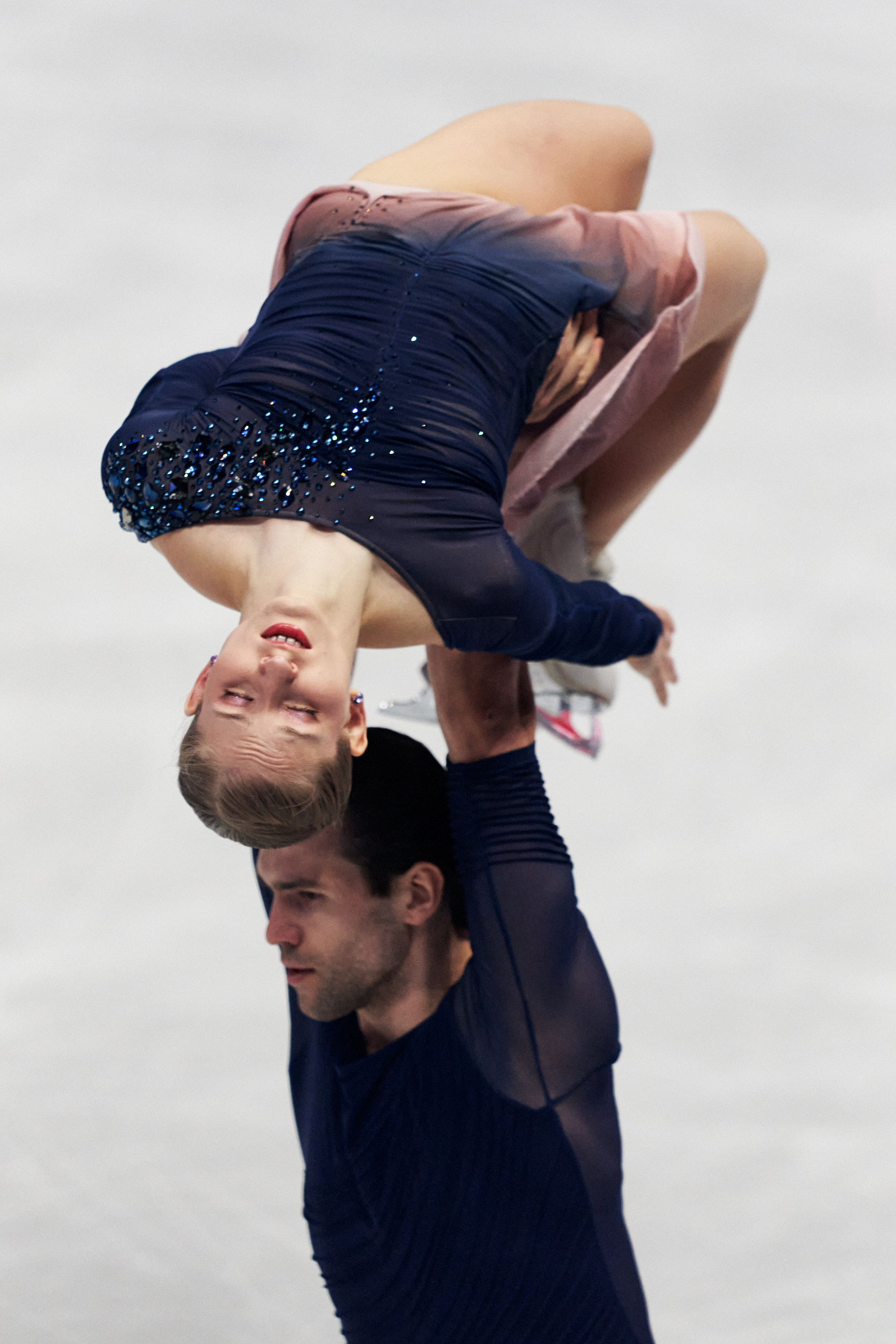
Hase and Volodin performing a lift at the 2026 World Championships

On 15 February, Hase/Volodin competed in the short program at the 2026 Winter Olympics, winning that segment with a personal best score. "We went onto the ice and wanted it to feel like training," said Hase following their short program. "To block out all the stress and the Olympics. It’s just another run. That’s how we went onto the ice. We did our job, and so of course we are very happy with the first part. But the big emotions, we’re saving those for later." The following day, Hase/Volodin placed third in the free skate due to mistakes on the side-by-side jumps, including Hase popping a planned triple Salchow into a single. As a result, they dropped to third overall behind Miura/Kihara and Metelkina/Berulava. Despite this, the pair expressed satisfaction with the result. "We are simply very relieved that it was enough for the bronze medal," Hase stated after their free skate. "No matter what color the medal is, we are just very proud that we were able to take a medal home from our first Olympic Games together, after only three years of skating together. I don’t think many people can say that about themselves. So the pride in our performance today is definitely bigger than anything else." Volodin added, "Bronze is one hundred percent a success. How can an Olympic medal be considered anything but a success? Yes, we were leading, but we knew we had very strong competitors here - the entire top ten. Every mistake is very costly. It’s great that under such conditions we were able to win a bronze medal."

The following month, Hase/Volodin competed at the 2026 World Figure Skating Championships place first in both the short program and free skate, taking the gold. “This medal means a lot,” said Hase. “It shows that we were on the right path and that we worked so hard to get here. Now we have a whole collection—bronze two years ago, silver last year, and now gold. It shows that we are growing as a team and that we can perform under pressure.”

=== 2026–27 season ===
Hase and Volodin kicked off their season in November at 2026 Skate America where they won gold. “We’re not one hundred percent satisfied with the performance today and yesterday, but it was the first competition,” said Hase. “So in general, we’re still quite happy with how it went. There were a lot of good elements, and a lot of good components for us. This is a competition we can build on. We are looking forward to Japan (NHK Trophy) in two weeks. It was a good season start overall, I think.”

== Programs ==
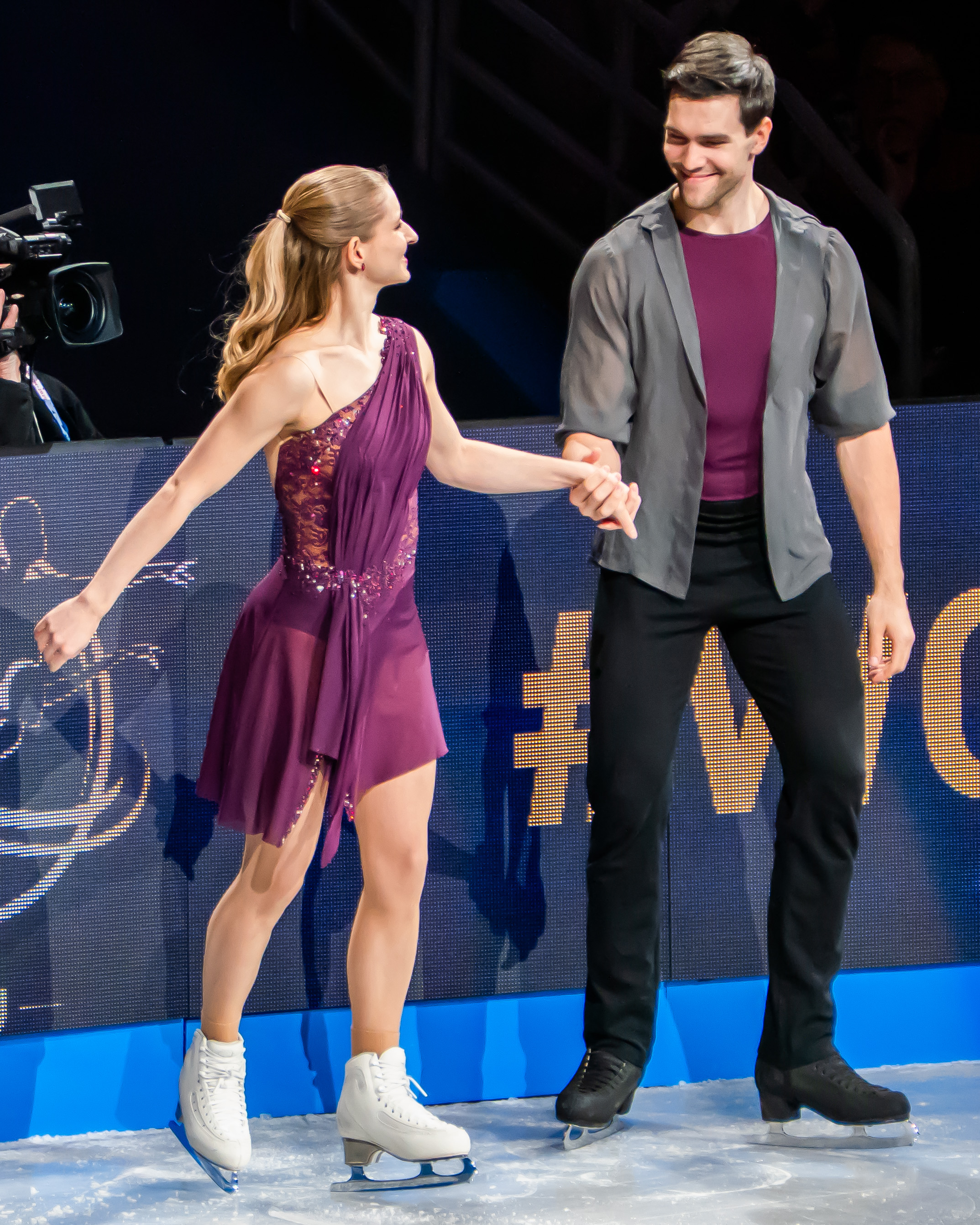
Hase and Volodin during their exhibition program at the 2025 World Championships

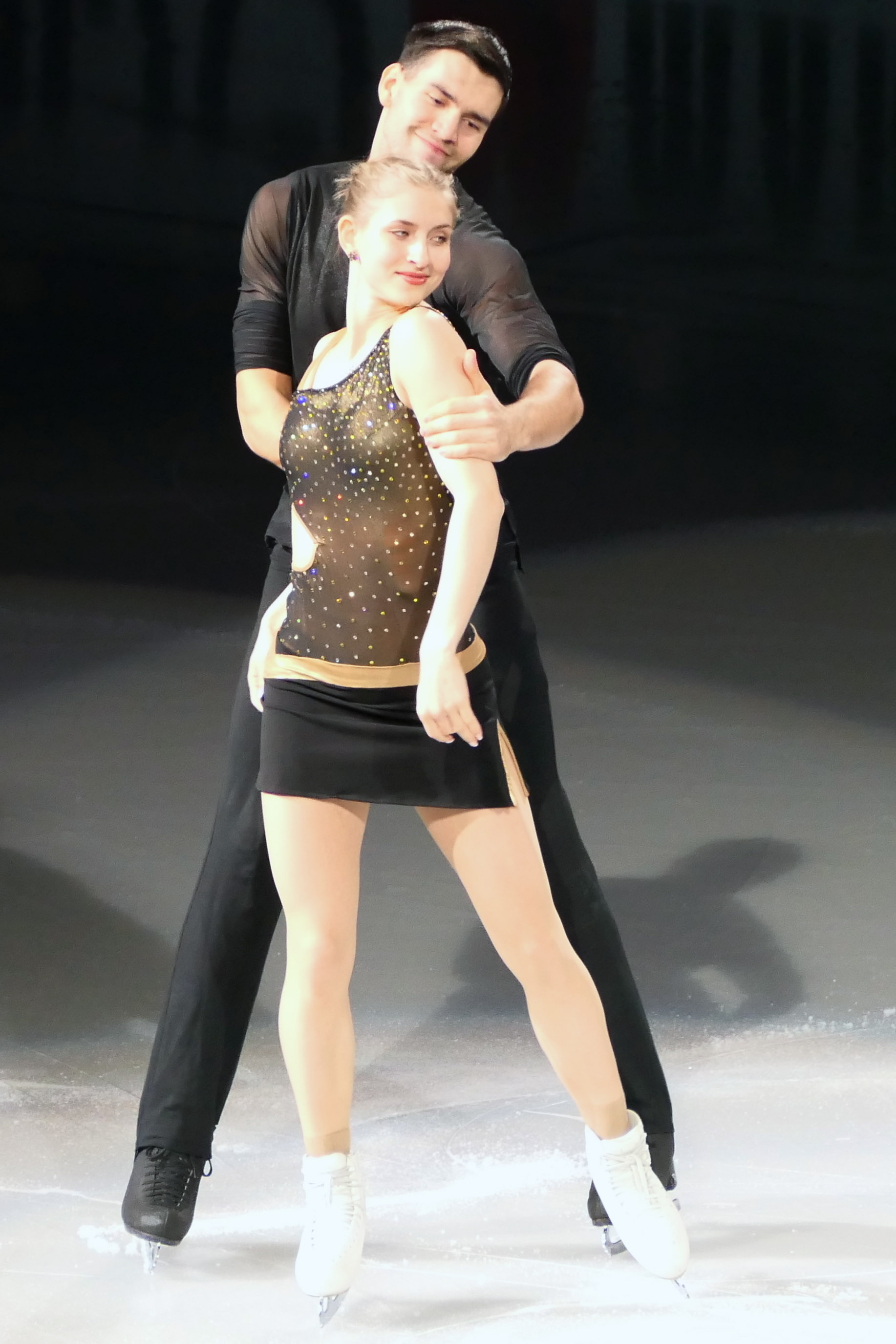
Hase and Volodin performing their exhibition program at the 2024 World Championships

=== With Hase ===
Season	Short program	Free skating	Exhibition
2025–2026	El Abrazo by Maxime Rodriguez & Frédéric Ruiz choreo. by Paul Boll & Mark Pillay	Memoryhouse; Europe, after the Rain; November; Europe, after the Rain; Last Days by Max Richter choreo. by Benoît Richaud	Fortitude by HAEVN; Always Remember Us This Way (from A Star Is Born) by Lady Gaga choreo. by Paul Boll
2024–2025	You Were Mine by Tami Neilson choreo. by Paul Boll & Mark Pillay	The Four Seasons by Antonio Vivaldi; The Four Seasons, Concerto No. 4 in F Minor, RV 297, "Winter"; The Four Seasons - Summer (Re:scored) performed by London Music Works choreo. by Paul Boll & Mark Pillay	Only Love Can Hurt Like This by Paloma Faith choreo. by Paul Boll; The Winner Takes It All by ABBA; Always Remember Us This Way (from A Star Is Born) by Lady Gaga choreo. by Paul Boll; When a Man Loves a Woman by Michael Bolton
2023–2024	Stay by Rihanna & Mikky Ekko choreo. by Paul Boll & Mark Pillay	The Path of Silence; The Power of Mind by Anne-Sophie Versnaeyen, Gabriel Saban & Phillipe Briand choreo. by Paul Boll & Mark Pillay	When a Man Loves a Woman by Michael Bolton; Feel It Still by Portugal. The Man choreo. by Paul Boll

=== With Atakhanova ===
Season	Short program	Free skating
2018–2019	Feel It Still	Larrons en foire by Raphael Beau; Micmacs (soundtrack) by Max Steiner
2017–2018	Feel It Still	unknown

=== With Ustimkina ===
Season	Short program	Free skating
2017–2018	Vertigogo by Combustible Edison	Aria by Balanescu Quartet
2016–2017	Mad Max: Fury Road by Junkie XL	Aria by Balanescu Quartet
2015–2016	Code Name Vivaldi by The Piano Guys	Dance For Me, Wallis (from W.E.) by Abel Korzeniowski

== Competitive highlights ==
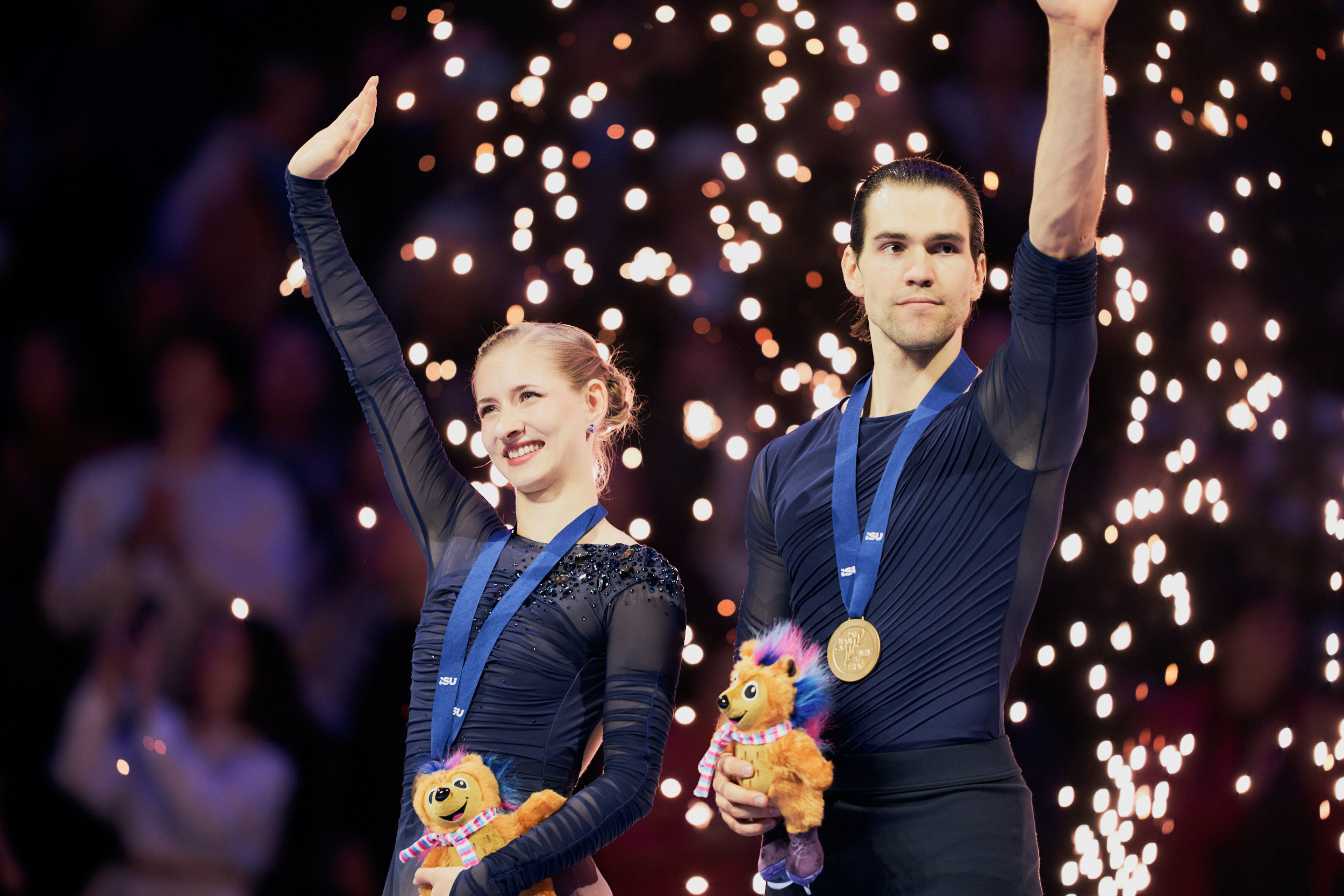
Hase/Volodin winning the gold medal at the 2026 World Championships

- GP – Event of the ISU Grand Prix Series
- JGP – Event of the ISU Junior Grand Prix Series
- CS – Event of the ISU Challenger Series
- TBD – Assigned
- WD – Withdrew from competition

=== Pair skating with Minerva Fabienne Hase (for Germany) ===
Competition placements at senior level
Season	2023–24	2024–25	2025–26	2026-27
Winter Olympics			3rd	
World Championships	3rd	2nd	1st	
European Championships	5th	1st	2nd	
Grand Prix Final	1st	1st	3rd	
German Championships	1st	1st	1st	
GP Cup of China		2nd		
GP Finland	1st		1st	
GP France		1st		
GP NHK Trophy	1st			TBD
GP Skate America				1st
GP Skate Canada			2nd	
CS Lombardia Trophy	2nd			
CS Nebelhorn Trophy	1st	1st	1st	
CS Trialeti Trophy			2nd	
Budapest Trophy	1st			
Trophée Métropole Nice		1st		

=== Pair skating with Taisiia Sobinina (for Russia) ===
Competition placements at junior level
Season	2019–20
Russian Championships (Senior)	11th S
Russian Championships (Junior)	6th
Volvo Open Cup	4th

=== Pair skating with Alina Ustimkina (for Russia) ===
Competition placements at senior level
Season	2016–17	2017–18
Russian Championships	WD	
CS Ice Star		5th
CS Tallinn Trophy	1st	

Competition placements at junior level
Season	2015–16	2016–17
Winter Youth Olympics	3rd	
Winter Youth Olympics (Team event)	8th	
World Junior Championships		6th
Junior Grand Prix Final		4th
Russian Championships	5th	3rd
JGP Estonia		2nd
JGP Germany		3rd
JGP Latvia	5th	
NRW Trophy	1st	

== Detailed results ==
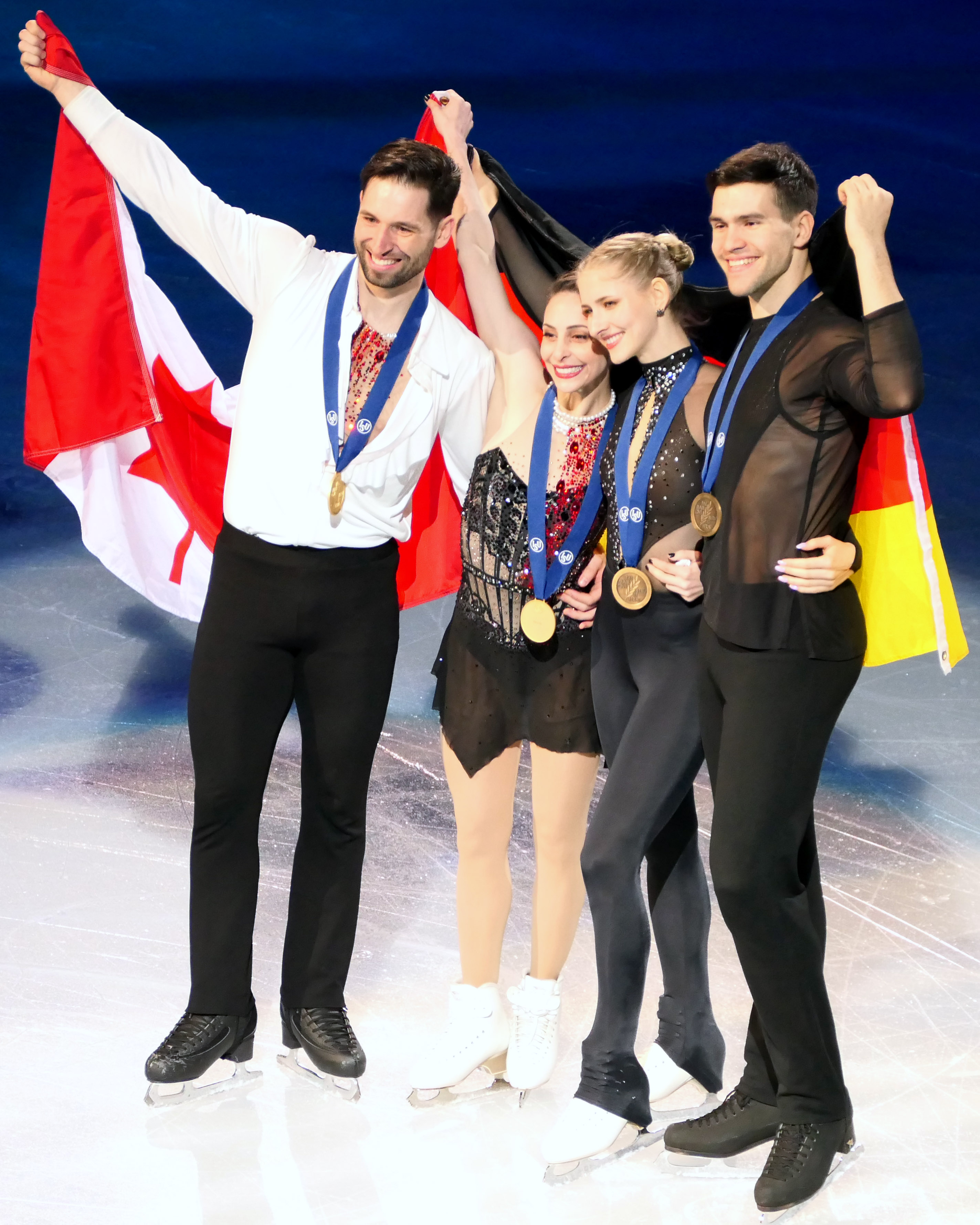
Hase/Volodin with Stellato-Dudek/Deschamps during the medal ceremony at the 2024 World Championships

=== Pair skating with Minerva Fabienne Hase (for Germany) ===
ISU personal best scores in the +5/-5 GOE System
Segment	Type	Score	Event
Total	TSS	228.33	2026 World Championships
Short program	TSS	80.01	2026 Winter Olympics
Short program	TES	43.91	2026 Winter Olympics
Short program	PCS	36.28	2026 World Championships
Free skating	TSS	149.57	2025–26 Grand Prix Final
Free skating	TES	78.81	2025–26 Grand Prix Final
Free skating	PCS	71.16	2025 CS Nebelhorn Trophy

- Small medals for the short program and free skating are only awarded at ISU Championships.

Results in the 2023–24 season
Date	Event	SP		FS		Total	
Date	Event	P	Score	P	Score	P	Score
Sep 8–10, 2023	(Italy) 2023 CS Lombardia Trophy	3	66.22	2	128.30	2	194.52
Sep 20–23, 2023	(Germany) 2023 CS Nebelhorn Trophy	3	62.85	1	132.11	1	194.96
Oct 13–15, 2023	(Hungary) 2023 Budapest Trophy	2	62.51	1	133.73	1	196.24
Nov 17–19, 2023	(Finland) 2023 Grand Prix of Espoo	3	63.59	1	129.13	1	192.72
Nov 24–26, 2023	(Japan) 2023 NHK Trophy	1	67.23	1	135.28	1	202.51
Dec 7–10, 2023	(China) 2023–24 Grand Prix Final	1	72.56	2	133.87	1	206.43
Dec 14–16, 2023	(Germany) 2024 German Championships	1	77.38	1	141.39	1	218.77
Jan 8–14, 2024	(Lithuania) 2024 European Championships	2	69.63	6	121.06	5	190.69
Mar 18–24, 2024	(Canada) 2024 World Championships	4	72.10	3	138.30	3	210.40

Results in the 2024–25 season
Date	Event	SP		FS		Total	
Date	Event	P	Score	P	Score	P	Score
Sep 19–21, 2024	(Germany) 2024 CS Nebelhorn Trophy	1	73.94	1	144.50	1	218.44
Oct 16–20, 2024	(France) 2024 Trophée Métropole Nice Côte d'Azur	1	71.66	—N/a	—N/a	1	71.66
Nov 1–3, 2024	2024 Grand Prix de France	1	73.72	1	137.97	1	211.69
Nov 22–24, 2024	2024 Cup of China	2	68.44	1	140.92	2	209.36
Dec 5–8, 2024	(France) 2024–25 Grand Prix Final	1	76.72	1	141.38	1	218.10
Dec 16–21, 2024	(Germany) 2025 German Championships	1	70.35	1	129.18	1	199.53
Jan 28 – Feb 2, 2025	(Estonia) 2025 European Championships	1	71.59	1	140.89	1	212.48
Mar 25–30, 2025	(United States) 2025 World Championships	3	73.59	1	145.49	2	219.08

Note: The senior pairs free skate at the 2024 Trophée Métropole Nice Côte d'Azur was cancelled on account of inclement weather. It was later announced that the short program results would be considered as the final results for the competition.

Results in the 2025–26 season
Date	Event	SP		FS		Total	
Date	Event	P	Score	P	Score	P	Score
Sep 25–27, 2025	(Germany) 2025 CS Nebelhorn Trophy	2	77.61	1	143.77	1	221.38
Oct 8–11, 2025	(Georgia (country)) 2025 CS Trialeti Trophy	2	74.67	2	133.61	2	208.28
Oct 31 – Nov 2, 2025	2025 Skate Canada International	1	77.53	3	129.65	2	207.18
Nov 21–23, 2025	(Finland) 2025 Finlandia Trophy	1	70.40	1	136.48	1	206.88
Dec 4–7, 2025	(Japan) 2025-26 Grand Prix Final	5	71.68	1	149.57	3	221.25
Dec 8–13, 2025	(Germany) 2026 German Championships	1	77.27	1	145.86	1	223.13
Jan 13–18, 2026	(United Kingdom) 2026 European Championships	2	74.81	3	129.06	2	203.87
Feb 6–19, 2026	(Italy) 2026 Winter Olympics	1	80.01	4	139.08	3	219.09
Mar 24–29, 2026	(Czech Republic) 2026 World Championships	1	79.78	1	148.55	1	228.33

Results in the 2026–27 season
Date	Event	SP		FS		Total	
Date	Event	P	Score	P	Score	P	Score
Nov 13-15, 2026	(United States) 2026 Skate America	1	72.71	1	128.08	1	200.79

=== Pair skating with Alina Ustimkina ===
ISU personal best scores in the +3/-3 GOE System
Segment	Type	Score	Event
Total	TSS	167.78	2016 CS Tallinn Trophy
Short program	TSS	65.64	2016 CS Tallinn Trophy
Short program	TES	37.64	2016 CS Tallinn Trophy
Short program	PCS	28.00	2016 CS Tallinn Trophy
Free skating	TSS	102.14	2016 CS Tallinn Trophy
Free skating	TES	52.04	2016 JGP Estonia
Free skating	PCS	53.92	2016 CS Tallinn Trophy

2017–18 season
Date	Event	Level	SP	FS	Total
26–29 October 2017	2017 CS Minsk-Arena Ice Star	Senior	5; 50.26	5; 86.70	5; 136.96
2016–17 season
Date	Event	Level	SP	FS	Total
15–19 March 2017	2017 World Junior Championships	Junior	4; 54.63	6; 91.06	6; 145.69
1–5 February 2017	2017 Russian Junior Championships	Junior	5; 61.73	2; 110.83	3; 172.56
20–26 December 2016	2017 Russian Championships	Senior	10; 55.35	WD	WD
8–11 December 2016	2016−17 JGP Final	Junior	3; 59.05	4; 99.09	4; 158.14
20–27 November 2016	2016 CS Tallinn Trophy	Senior	1; 65.64	2; 102.14	1; 167.78
5–9 October 2016	2016 JGP Germany	Junior	2; 59.34	4; 95.92	3; 155.26
28 September – 2 October 2016	2016 JGP Estonia	Junior	2; 57.31	2; 99.64	2; 156.95
2015–16 season
Date	Event	Level	SP	FS	Total
12–21 February 2016	2016 Winter Youth Olympics - Team Event	Junior	-	3; 100.98	8
12–21 February 2016	2016 Winter Youth Olympics	Junior	3; 56.38	3; 96.39	3; 152.77
19–23 January 2016	2016 Russian Junior Championships	Junior	9; 51.24	4; 104.27	5; 155.51
24–29 November 2015	2015 NRW Trophy	Junior	2; 49.64	1; 93.10	1; 142.74
26–30 August 2015	2015 JGP Latvia	Junior	4; 46.78	6; 75.33	5; 122.11
