= 2016–17 Japan Figure Skating Championships =

Figure skating competition

- Type: National championship
- Date: December 22ー25, 2016 (S); November 18ー20, 2016 (J)
- Season: 2016–17
- Location: Kadoma, Osaka (S); Sapporo, Hokkaido (J)
- Venue: RACTAB Namihaya Dome (S); Tsukisamu Gymnasium (J)

Champions
- Men's singles: Shoma Uno (S); Kazuki Tomono (J)
- Ladies' singles: Satoko Miyahara (S); Kaori Sakamoto (J)
- Pairs: Sumire Suto / Francis Boudreau Audet (S); Riku Miura / Shoya Ichihashi (J)
- Ice dance: Kana Muramoto / Chris Reed (S); Rikako Fukase / Aru Tateno (J)
- Previous: 2015–16 Japan Championships
- Next: 2017–18 Japan Championships

The 2016–17 Japan Figure Skating Championships were held on December 22ー25, 2016 at the RACTAB Namihaya Dome in Kadoma, Osaka. It was the 85th edition of the event. Medals were awarded in the disciplines of men's singles, ladies' singles, pair skating, and ice dancing.

== Results ==
=== Men ===
Hanyu withdrew due to influenza two days before the competition.

Rank	Name	Club	Total points	SP		FS	
1	Shoma Uno	Chukyo University / 中京大学	280.41	2	88.05	1	192.36
2	Keiji Tanaka	Kurashiki Univ. of Science and Arts / 倉敷芸術科学大学	249.38	3	85.68	2	163.70
3	Takahito Mura	HIROTA	242.11	1	90.34	3	151.77
4	Ryuju Hino	Chukyo University / 中京大学	230.31	4	78.65	4	151.66
5	Kazuki Tomono	Naniwa JHS/HS Skating Club / 浪速中・高ｽｹｰﾄ部	216.55	6	67.63	5	148.92
6	Shu Nakamura	Kansai University / 関西大学	202.16	7	66.96	7	135.20
7	Koshiro Shimada	Shujitsu High School / 就実学園	200.18	10	62.66	6	137.52
8	Hiroaki Sato	Iwate University / 岩手大学	192.70	5	72.01	10	120.69
9	Sena Miyake	Okayama Figure Skating Club / 岡山FSC	188.46	11	61.96	9	126.50
10	Tatsuya Tsuboi	Howa Sportsland / 邦和スポーツランド	187.03	15	59.49	8	127.54
11	Sei Kawahara	Fukuoka University / 福岡大学	180.69	13	60.47	12	120.22
12	Taichi Honda	Kansai Univ. JHS/HS Skating Club / 関西大学中・高ｽｹｰﾄ部	179.84	9	63.87	16	115.97
13	Mitsuki Sumoto	Naniwa JHS/HS Skating Club / 浪速中・高ｽｹｰﾄ部	178.60	12	60.97	14	117.63
14	Jun Suzuki	Hokkaido University / 北海道大学	177.54	8	66.17	18	111.37
15	Naoki Oda	Kurashiki Univ. of Science and Arts / 倉敷芸術科学大学	177.02	16	58.76	13	118.26
16	Yuto Kishina	Konkou Gakuen / 金光学園	175.94	17	58.43	15	117.51
17	Yoji Nakano	Meiji University / 明治大学	175.29	14	60.25	17	115.04
18	Ryo Sagami	Meiji University / 明治大学	173.69	23	53.27	11	120.42
19	Hidetsugu Kamata	Meiji University / 明治大学	159.07	20	54.53	19	104.54
20	Kohei Yoshino	Kansai University / 関西大学	157.32	19	55.23	21	102.09
21	Satoshi Nakamura	Nagano City Skating Club / 長野市スケート協会	157.24	22	53.53	20	103.71
22	Junsuke Tokikuni	Doshisha University / 同志社大学	151.99	18	56.47	23	95.52
23	Keiichiro Sasahara	Doshisha University / 同志社大学	151.29	21	54.37	22	96.92
24	Kosuke Nakano	Fukuoka University / 福岡大学	140.77	24	52.82	24	87.95
Did not advance to free skating
25	Koshin Yamada	SMBC		25	51.16	—N/a	
26	Junya Watanabe	Kansai Gakuin University / 関西学院大学		26	50.52	—N/a	
27	Hiroki Honda	Nippon University / 日本大学		27	49.23	—N/a	
28	Genki Suzuki	Gakushuin University / 学習院大学		28	44.12	—N/a	
29	Shion Kamata	Meiji University / 明治大学		29	39.81	—N/a	
WD	Yuzuru Hanyu	All Nippon Airways (ANA)	withdrew from competition				

=== Ladies ===
Miyahara won the national title for the third year in a row.

Rank	Name	Club	Total points	SP		FS	
1	Satoko Miyahara	Kansai Univ. JHS/HS Skating Club / 関西大学中・高ｽｹｰﾄ部	214.87	1	76.49	1	138.38
2	Wakaba Higuchi	Nihonbashi Girls' High School / 日本橋女学館	199.49	3	68.74	4	130.75
3	Mai Mihara	Kobe Port Island Club / 神戸ポートアイランドクラブ	198.17	5	65.91	2	132.26
4	Marin Honda	Kansai Univ. JHS/HS Skating Club / 関西大学中・高ｽｹｰﾄ部	196.11	4	67.52	5	128.59
5	Rika Hongo	Howa Sportsland / 邦和スポーツランド	194.28	2	69.20	6	125.08
6	Yuna Shiraiwa	Kansai University FSC / 関西大学KFSC	185.37	17	54.30	3	131.07
7	Kaori Sakamoto	Kobe Figure Skating Club / 神戸FSC	184.00	6	63.36	9	120.64
8	Kanako Murakami	Chukyo University / 中京大学	182.55	12	58.52	7	124.03
9	Saya Suzuki	Howa SC / 邦和SC	180.41	9	60.36	10	120.35
10	Yura Matsuda	Chukyo University High School / 中京大中京高校	180.27	7	61.63	11	118.64
11	Rin Nitaya	Chukyo University / 中京大学	176.86	16	54.31	8	122.55
12	Mao Asada	Chukyo University / 中京大学	174.42	8	60.32	12	114.10
13	Miyabi Oba	Chukyo University / 中京大学	165.45	10	59.19	13	106.26
14	Riko Takino	Osaka Skating Club / 大阪スケート倶楽部	163.27	11	59.13	14	104.14
15	Ayaka Hosoda	Kansai University / 関西大学	159.13	13	56.88	15	102.25
16	Hinano Isobe	Chukyo University / 中京大学	153.34	14	55.10	17	98.24
17	Mariko Kihara	Doshisha University/ 同志社大学	151.35	23	50.44	16	100.91
18	Honoka Hirotani	Hachinohe Institute of Technology High School / 八工大一高	148.71	18	53.50	20	95.21
19	Haruka Imai	Niigata Kenren / 新潟県連	147.58	21	51.29	18	96.29
20	Nana Matsushima	Waseda University / 早稲田大学	147.32	20	51.97	19	95.35
21	Miyu Nakashio	Hiroshima Skating Club / 広島スケートクラブ	145.85	15	54.99	21	90.86
22	Rino Kasakake	Polaris Chubu FSC / ポラリス中部FSC	135.11	22	51.22	22	83.89
23	Kirari Kobayashi	Shumei Eiko High School / 秀明英光高校	131.75	24	49.14	23	82.61
24	Yuka Nagai	Komaba Gakuen High School / 駒場学園高校	131.40	19	53.23	24	78.17
Did not advance to free skating
25	Hina Takeno	Fukuoka University / 福岡大学		25	47.39	—N/a	
26	Saya Ueno	Kansai University / 関西大学		26	47.38	—N/a	
27	Miaki Morishita	Aquapia Skating Club / ｱｸｱﾋﾟｱｽｹｰﾃｨﾝｸﾞC		27	47.13	—N/a	
28	Hinata Oosawa	Misawa Gold FSC / 三沢GOLD FSC		28	46.41	—N/a	
29	Chinatsu Mori	Aichi Mizuho University High School / 愛知みずほ大瑞穂高校		29	45.10	—N/a	
30	Reia Funasako	Chiba Keizai University High School / 千葉経済大学附属高校		30	41.12	—N/a	

=== Pairs ===
Rank	Name	Club	Total points	SP		FS	
1	Sumire Suto / Francis Boudreau Audet	Kanagawa FSC/CAN / 神奈川/CAN	160.25	1	56.96	1	103.29
2	Miu Suzaki / Ryuichi Kihara	Kinoshita Club / 木下クラブ	146.25	2	50.07	2	96.18
3	Marin Ono / Wesley Killing	Hyougo Nishinomiya FSC/CAN / ひょうご西宮FSC/CAN	136.06	3	45.54	3	90.12
4	Narumi Takahashi / Ryo Shibata	Kinoshita Club / 木下クラブ	122.38	4	43.25	4	79.13

=== Ice dancing ===
Rank	Name	Club	Total points	SP		FS	
1	Kana Muramoto / Chris Reed	Kinoshita Club / 木下クラブ	158.36	1	62.04	1	96.32
2	Emi Hirai / Marien de la Asuncion	Osaka Skating Club / 大阪スケート倶楽部	140.97	2	56.47	2	84.50
3	Misato Komatsubara / Tim Koleto	Kurashiki FSC/USA / 倉敷FSC/USA	125.12	3	51.47	3	73.85
4	Ibuki Mori / Kentaro Suzuki	Meito FSC/Papio FC / 名東FSC/ﾊﾟﾋﾟｵﾌｨｷﾞｭｱｸﾗﾌﾞ	122.59	4	49.65	4	72.94
5	Nicole Takahashi / Atsuhiko Okuda	Dream FSC/Kansai Skating Club / Dream FSC/関西スケーティングC	81.60	5	32.38	5	49.22

== Japan Junior Figure Skating Championships ==
The 2016–17 Junior Championships took place on November 18–20, 2016 at the Tsukisamu Gymnasium in Sapporo, Hokkaido. Medals were awarded in the men's singles, ladies' singles, and ice dancing. The junior pairs competition was held during the senior Championships the following month.

=== Men ===
Rank	Name	Club	Total points	SP		FS	
1	Kazuki Tomono		207.85	1	71.77	1	136.08
2	Koshiro Shimada		198.20	2	66.19	2	132.01
3	Mitsuki Sumoto		191.81	3	63.60	3	128.21
4	Yuto Kishina		181.25	5	58.76	4	122.49
5	Tatsuya Tsuboi		177.62	6	56.07	5	121.55
6	Sena Miyake		174.86	10	53.75	6	121.11
7	Kazuki Hasegawa		170.89	4	59.66	11	111.23
8	Taichiro Yamakuma		167.15	18	50.05	7	117.10
9	Ryoma Kobayashi		166.59	14	52.33	8	114.26
10	Kento Kobayashi		164.27	17	50.26	9	114.01
11	Yuma Kagiyama		164.14	8	54.35	12	109.79
12	Tsunehito Karakawa		163.84	15	52.23	10	111.61
13	Ichigo Santo		163.19	11	53.64	13	109.55
14	Kotaro Takeuchi		157.53	9	53.80	15	103.73
15	Shun Sato		157.03	7	55.89	16	101.14
16	Shingo Nishiyama		154.63	19	48.95	14	105.68
17	Lucas Tsuyoshi Honda		150.83	16	51.32	17	99.51
18	Reo Ishizuka		149.39	12	53.57	20	95.82
19	Yuki Kunikata		146.14	13	52.86	21	93.28
20	Haruya Sasaki		145.80	20	47.91	18	97.89
21	Takeru Amine Kataise		141.66	22	45.73	19	95.93
22	Keisuke Kadowaki		137.94	21	46.54	23	91.40
23	Tatuma Furuya		135.52	23	43.33	22	92.19
24	Shinichi Yamada		125.46	24	42.02	24	83.44
Did not advance to free skating
25	Shoya Ichihashi			25	41.19	—N/a	
26	Takumi Sugiyama			26	40.96	—N/a	
27	Kazuki Kushida			27	40.92	—N/a	
28	Yuki Mori			28	40.86	—N/a	
29	Sumitada Moriguchi			29	37.57	—N/a	

=== Ladies ===
Rank	Name	Club	Total points	SP		FS	
1	Kaori Sakamoto		191.97	1	67.45	2	124.52
2	Yuna Shiraiwa		185.13	3	59.16	1	125.97
3	Marin Honda		176.23	2	64.86	6	111.37
4	Rino Kasakake		173.97	5	57.40	3	116.57
5	Saya Suzuki		166.38	9	53.72	4	112.66
6	Riko Takino		165.41	6	57.28	8	108.13
7	Akari Matsubara		162.96	12	50.68	5	112.28
8	Yuhana Yokoi		162.84	10	52.28	7	110.56
9	Yuna Aoki		161.35	8	56.80	9	104.55
10	Kokoro Iwamoto		157.56	7	57.02	11	100.54
11	Rika Kihira		153.73	4	58.86	14	94.87
12	Akari Matsuoka		148.80	20	45.48	10	103.32
13	Rion Sumiyoshi		147.64	11	52.13	13	95.51
14	Yukino Fuji		142.21	15	47.43	15	94.78
15	Moa Iwano		139.98	21	45.46	16	94.52
16	Mako Yamashita		139.81	22	42.28	12	97.53
17	Maho Mitsuno		138.29	17	46.53	17	91.76
18	Lina Yoshida		132.49	18	46.37	18	86.12
19	Hinako Katou		131.58	16	46.89	19	84.69
20	Midori Yokoyama		124.58	14	47.67	21	76.91
21	Mana Kawabe		123.94	24	41.41	20	82.53
22	Chisato Uramatsu		122.79	13	49.44	23	73.35
23	Sui Takeuchi		122.36	19	45.62	22	76.74
24	Riko Ohashi		113.65	23	41.81	24	71.84
Did not advance to free skating
25	Hinako Senoo			25	41.33	—N/a	
26	Yuna Miyoshi			26	39.97	—N/a	
27	Tomoe Kawabata			27	39.87	—N/a	
28	Maika Kubo			28	38.95	—N/a	
29	Niina Takeno			29	37.51	—N/a	
30	Eri Tamiwa			30	35.95	—N/a	

=== Pairs ===
Rank	Name	Club	Total points	SP		FS	
1	Riku Miura / Shoya Ichihashi	大阪スケート倶楽部 / 関大北陽スケート部	111.68	1	39.19	1	72.49

=== Ice dancing ===
Rank	Name	Club	Total points	SD		FD	
1	Rikako Fukase / Aru Tateno		130.84	1	53.24	1	77.60
2	Yuka Orihara / Kanata Mori		103.54	2	47.88	3	55.66
3	Haruno Yajima / Daiki Shimazaki		90.04	3	37.56	4	52.48
4	Utana Yoshida / Takumi Sugiyama		86.70	6	29.88	2	56.82
5	Mai Kashino / Yuhi Kashino		74.74	5	30.62	5	44.12
6	Yu Iwasaki / Yoshimitu Ikeda		68.48	4	33.82	6	34.66

== International team selections ==
The Japan Skating Federation selected skaters for international competitions in the second half of the 2016–17 season based on the results of the National Championships, as well as international ISU-sanctioned competitions. It published its list of entries on December 27, 2016.

=== World Championships ===
The 2017 World Championships will be held from March 29 to April 2, 2017, in Helsinki, Finland. The event will also determine the number of spots per discipline that countries will earn for the 2018 Winter Olympics in Pyeongchang, South Korea.

	Men	Ladies	Pairs	Ice dancing
1	Yuzuru Hanyu	Satoko Miyahara	Sumire Suto / Francis Boudreau Audet	Kana Muramoto / Chris Reed
2	Shoma Uno	Wakaba Higuchi		
3	Keiji Tanaka	Mai Mihara		

=== Four Continents Championships ===
The 2017 Four Continents Championships will be held on February 14–19, 2017 in Gangneung, South Korea.

	Men	Ladies	Pairs	Ice dancing
1	Yuzuru Hanyu	Satoko Miyahara	Sumire Suto / Francis Boudreau Audet	Kana Muramoto / Chris Reed
2	Shoma Uno	Wakaba Higuchi	Miu Suzaki / Ryuichi Kihara	Emi Hirai / Marien de la Asuncion
3	Keiji Tanaka	Mai Mihara		

=== World Junior Championships ===
The 2017 World Junior Figure Skating Championships will take place on March 14–19, 2017 in Taipei.

	Men	Ladies	Pairs	Ice dancing
1	Kazuki Tomono	Marin Honda		Rikako Fukase / Aru Tateno
2	Koshiro Shimada	Kaori Sakamoto		
3		Yuna Shiraiwa		

=== Asian Winter Games ===
The 2017 Asian Winter Games will be held on February 19–26, 2017 in Sapporo and Obihiro, Hokkaido, Japan. Within the Winter Games period, figure skating events will take place on February 23–26, 2017 at the Makomanai Ice Arena in Sapporo.

	Men	Ladies	Pairs	Ice dancing
1	Shoma Uno	Satoko Miyahara	Miu Suzaki / Ryuichi Kihara	Kana Muramoto / Chris Reed
2	Takahito Mura	Rika Hongo	Narumi Takahashi / Ryo Shibata	Ibuki Mori / Kentaro Suzuki
