= 2017–18 Japan Figure Skating Championships =

Figure skating competition

- Type: National championship
- Date: December 20ー24, 2017 (S); November 24ー26, 2017 (J)
- Season: 2017–18
- Location: Tokyo (S); Maebashi (J)
- Venue: Musashino Forest Sports Plaza (S); Gunma Sports Complex (J)

Champions
- Men's singles: Shoma Uno (S); Mitsuki Sumoto (J)
- Ladies' singles: Satoko Miyahara (S); Rika Kihira (J)
- Pairs: Miu Suzaki / Ryuichi Kihara (S); Riku Miura / Shoya Ichihashi (J)
- Ice dance: Kana Muramoto / Chris Reed (S); Haruno Yajima / Daiki Shimazaki (J)
- Previous: 2016–17 Japan Championships
- Next: 2018–19 Japan Championships

The 2017-18 Japan Figure Skating Championships were held on December 20–24, 2017 at the Musashino Forest Sports Plaza in Tokyo. It was the 86th edition of the event. Medals were awarded in the disciplines of men's singles, ladies' singles, pair skating, and ice dance.

== Results ==
=== Men ===
Uno won his second consecutive national title.

Hanyu withdrew to continue recovering from an ankle injury he sustained in practice at the 2017 NHK Trophy.

Rank	Name	Club	Total points	SP		FS	
1	Shoma Uno	Toyota Motor Corporation / トヨタ自動車	283.30	1	96.83	1	186.47
2	Keiji Tanaka	Kurashiki Univ. of Science and Arts / 倉敷芸術科学大学	267.15	2	91.34	2	175.81
3	Takahito Mura	HIROTA	258.41	3	85.53	3	172.88
4	Kazuki Tomono	Doshisha Figure Skating Club / 同志社大学	231.21	5	78.16	5	153.05
5	Daisuke Murakami	yoshindo / 陽進堂	230.95	4	80.99	7	149.96
6	Mitsuki Sumoto	Naniwa High School / 浪速中・高ｽｹｰﾄ部	225.76	7	72.93	6	152.83
7	Ryuju Hino	Chukyo University / 中京大学	223.61	10	68.22	4	155.39
8	Hiroaki Sato	Iwate University / 岩手大学	214.85	6	77.98	9	136.87
9	Sota Yamamoto	AMC Mizuho High School / 愛知みずほ大瑞穂高校	208.27	8	72.88	10	135.39
10	Jun Suzuki	Hokkaido University / 北海道大学	207.39	12	66.83	8	140.56
11	Sena Miyake	Okayama Figure Skating Club / 岡山FSC	199.95	9	68.77	15	131.18
12	Sei Kawahara	Fukuoka University / 福岡大学	199.37	11	67.74	14	131.63
13	Tatsuya Tsuboi	Howa Sportsland / 邦和スポーツランド	198.71	14	63.35	11	135.36
14	Shu Nakamura	Kansai University Skating Club / 関西大学	198.16	13	65.75	13	134.41
15	Taichi Honda	Kansai University Skating Club / 関西大学	192.87	18	59.75	12	133.12
16	Shun Sato	Sendai FSC / 仙台FSC	185.52	20	57.77	16	127.75
17	Kazuki Kushida	Okayama Figure Skating Club / 岡山FSC	181.29	17	60.06	17	121.23
18	Koshin Yamada	SMBC	177.40	16	61.01	19	116.39
19	Yuto Kishina	Konkou Gakuen / 金光学園	174.13	23	56.16	18	117.97
20	Kento Kajita	Meiji University / 明治大学	172.57	19	58.65	20	113.92
21	Tsunehito Karakawa	Nihon University / 日本大学	169.86	21	56.64	21	113.22
22	Yoji Nakano	Meiji University / 明治大学	159.34	22	56.56	22	102.78
23	Ryo Sagami	Meiji University / 明治大学	154.16	15	63.05	24	99.90
24	Junya Watanabe	Kansai Gakuin University / 関西学院大学	153.91	24	54.01	23	91.11
Did not advance to free skating
25	Kousuke Nakano	Fukuoka University / 福岡大学		25	53.62	—	
26	Hidetsugu Kamata	Meiji University / 明治大学		26	52.66	—	
27	Junsuke Tokikuni	Doshisha Figure Skating Club / 同志社大学		27	51.71	—	
28	Kento Kobayashi	Hosei / 法政大学		28	51.18	—	
29	Kento Suginaka	関西学院大学		29	43.66	—	
WD	Yuzuru Hanyu	All Nippon Airways (ANA)	withdrew from competition				

=== Ladies ===
Miyahara won the national title for the fourth year in a row.

Rank	Name	Club	Total points	SP		FS	
1	Satoko Miyahara	Kansai University Figure Skating Club / 関西大学	220.39	2	73.23	1	147.16
2	Kaori Sakamoto	Sysmex / シスメックス	213.51	1	73.59	4	139.92
3	Rika Kihira	Kansai University Figure Skating Club / 関西大学KFSC	208.03	5	66.74	2	141.29
4	Wakaba Higuchi	Nihonbashi Girls' High School / 日本橋女学館	206.96	4	68.93	5	138.03
5	Mai Mihara	Sysmex / シスメックス	204.67	7	64.27	3	140.40
6	Rika Hongo	Howa Sportsland / 邦和スポーツランド	197.62	3	70.48	8	127.14
7	Marin Honda	Kansai JHS/HS Skating Club / 関西大学中・高ｽｹｰﾄ部	193.37	6	66.65	9	126.72
8	Yuhana Yokoi	Chukyo Senior High School / 中京大中京高校	192.99	9	62.68	6	130.31
9	Yuna Shiraiwa	Kansai University Figure Skating Club / 関西大学KFSC	191.69	8	63.33	7	128.36
10	Mako Yamashita	Grand Prix Tokai Club / グランプリ東海クラブ	183.34	15	57.80	10	125.54
11	Yura Matsuda	Chukyo University High School / 中京大中京高校	174.12	17	55.91	11	118.21
12	Rin Nitaya	Chukyo University / 中京大学	172.50	10	61.28	15	111.22
13	Nana Araki	Chukyo Senior High School / 中京大中京高校	171.74	12	59.66	14	112.08
14	Kokoro Iwamoto	Kansai University Figure Skating Club / 関西大学KFSC	170.64	16	56.16	12	114.48
15	Mariko Kihara	Doshisha University / 同志社大学	169.61	18	55.50	13	114.11
16	Hina Takeno	Fukuoka University / 福岡大学	169.55	14	59.22	16	110.33
17	Sui Takeuchi	Daido High School Skating Club / 大同大大同SC	169.02	11	60.93	17	108.09
18	Miaki Morisita	Aquapia Skating Club / ｱｸｱﾋﾟｱｽｹｰﾃｨﾝｸﾞC	165.25	13	59.43	20	105.82
19	Rinka Watanabe	Aomoriyamada JHS F.S / 青森山田中学校	161.91	19	55.46	18	106.45
20	Hinano Isobe	Chukyo University / 中京大学	158.18	21	52.36	21	105.82
21	Tomoe Kawabata	N-kō Tōkyō / N高東京	158.16	22	52.13	19	106.03
22	Yuka Nagai	Waseda University / 早稲田大学	152.26	20	55.25	24	97.01
23	Riona Kato	Chukyo University / 中京大学	151.06	24	49.53	22	101.53
24	Ibuki Satoh	Komaba Gakuen High School / 駒場学園高校	148.56	23	50.84	23	97.72
Did not advance to free skating
25	Rika Oya	Meiji University / 明治大学		25	48.49	—	
26	Ayaka Hosoda	Kansai University / 関西大学		26	47.15	—	
27	Chinatsu Mori	Meiji University / 明治大学		27	46.37	—	
28	Miyu Nakashio	Hiroshima Skate Club / 広島スケートクラブ		28	44.60	—	
29	Mone Kawanishi	Yamanashi HS/Univ. / 山梨学院大学		29	42.75	—	
30	Honoka Hirotani	Hachinohe Kodai Ichi / 八戸工大一高		30	38.17	—	

=== Pairs ===
Rank	Name	Club	Total points	SP		FS	
1	Miu Suzaki / Ryuichi Kihara	Kinoshita Club / 木下クラブ	160.71	1	54.53	1	106.18
2	Narumi Takahashi / Ryo Shibata	Kinoshita Club / 木下クラブ	143.93	3	49.29	2	94.64
3	Riku Miura / Shoya Ichihashi	Osaka Skating Club 大阪スケート倶楽部 / Kansai University 関西大学	140.76	2	51.54	3	89.22

=== Ice dance ===
Rank	Name	Club	Total points	SP		FS	
1	Kana Muramoto / Chris Reed	Kinoshita Club / 木下クラブ	166.45	1	65.71	1	100.74
2	Misato Komatsubara / Timothy Koleto	Kurashiki FSC/USA / 倉敷FSC/USA	149.47	2	56.65	2	92.82
3	Rikako Fukase / Aru Tateno	Daitobunka University 大東文化大学 / Hosei University 法政大学	130.27	3	47.43	3	82.84
4	Yuka Orihara / Kanata Mori	Musashino FSC ムサシノFSクラブ / Meiji University 明治大学	113.89	4	45.54	4	68.35
5	Mio Iida / Kenta Ishibashi	Kansai HS/Univ. / 関西学院大学	86.32	5	34.25	5	52.07

== Japan Junior Figure Skating Championships ==
The 2017–18 Junior Championships took place on November 24–26, 2017 at the Gunma Sports Complex in Maebashi, Gunma.

=== Men ===
Rank	Name	Total points	SP		FS	
1	Mitsuki Sumoto	198.19	1	67.34	1	130.85
2	Sena Miyake	189.17	2	66.09	5	123.08
3	Tatsuya Tsuboi	189.15	5	63.53	2	125.62
4	Kazuki Kushida	189.00	4	63.98	3	125.02
5	Yuto Kishina	184.94	6	61.35	4	123.59
6	Shun Sato	180.20	11	59.64	6	120.56
7	Kazuki Hasegawa	175.48	3	64.18	10	111.30
8	Taichiro Yamakuma	173.67	7	61.18	8	112.49
9	Shingo Nishayama	172.97	8	60.07	7	112.90
10	Takeru Amine Kataise	170.87	12	58.68	9	112.19
11	Ichigo Santo	170.61	9	59.99	11	110.62
12	Yuma Kagiyama	162.40	14	55.25	13	107.15
13	Kao Miura	162.40	10	59.98	14	102.42
14	Haruya Sasaki	155.25	19	45.87	12	109.38
15	Keisuke Kadowaki	154.08	13	55.53	15	98.55
16	Lucas Tsuyoshi Honda	146.23	15	53.51	17	92.72
17	Kenta Kuninaka	142.88	20	45.22	16	97.66
18	Yuga Furusho	140.15	17	49.33	18	90.82
19	Minato Shiga	134.32	18	48.28	21	86.04
20	Nozomu Yoshioka	131.52	23	41.82	19	89.70
21	Haru Kakiuchi	130.24	22	41.86	20	88.38
22	Kosho Oshima	129.71	21	44.99	22	84.72
23	Yuki Kunikata	128.09	16	50.39	23	77.70
24	Kinari Sugahara	115.05	24	41.09	24	73.96
Did not advance to free skating
25	Ryoto Midorikawa		25	38.88	—	
26	Shunsuke Nakamura		26	38.86	—	
27	Kimichika Wada		27	38.68	—	
28	Seiya Tsuboi		28	33.51	—	

=== Ladies ===
Rank	Name	Total points	SP		FS	
1	Rika Kihira	193.46	6	57.89	1	135.57
2	Mako Yamashita	190.03	1	65.13	2	124.90
3	Nana Araki	177.07	2	61.51	4	115.56
4	Yuhana Yokoi	172.97	7	56.89	3	116.08
5	Rinka Watanabe	168.62	4	59.45	5	109.17
6	Tomoe Kawabata	167.52	3	61.49	6	106.03
7	Riko Takino	164.78	5	58.87	7	105.91
8	Hana Yoshida	158.04	12	54.89	10	103.15
9	Saya Suzuki	157.29	11	54.95	11	102.34
10	Wakana Naganawa	155.47	8	56.87	12	98.60
11	Moa Iwano	153.52	9	56.62	13	96.90
12	Akari Matsubara	153.51	20	50.28	9	103.23
13	Lina Yoshida	151.91	24	48.81	8	104.10
14	Kinayu Yokoi	150.38	14	53.83	14	96.55
15	Shiika Yoshioka	148.00	13	54.43	17	93.57
16	Akari Matsuoka	147.32	16	51.36	15	95.96
17	Yuna Aoki	146.20	17	51.27	16	94.93
18	Maria Egawa	143.26	21	50.21	18	93.05
19	Serina Okada	143.30	19	50.43	19	92.77
20	Miyu Honda	140.39	15	52.57	21	87.82
21	Nonoka Ise	137.72	22	49.15	20	88.57
22	Rino Kasakake	137.31	10	55.61	22	81.70
23	Natsu Suzuki	128.62	18	51.19	23	77.43
24	Yuka Chon	121.51	23	48.99	24	72.52
Did not advance to free skating
25	Rei Yoshimoto		25	48.45	—	
26	Arisa Nakamoto		26	48.07	—	
27	Rika Tejima		27	47.05	—	
28	Saki Miyake		28	45.57	—	
29	Midori Yokoyama		29	45.03	—	
30	Yukino Fuji		30	41.21	—	

=== Pairs ===
Rank	Name	Total points	SP		FS	
1	Riku Miura / Shoya Ichihashi	124.72	1	48.47	1	76.25
2	Marino Ono / Kurtis Kazuki Schreiber	112.90	2	42.27	2	70.63

=== Ice dance ===
Rank	Name	Total points	SD		FD	
1	Haruno Yajima / Daiki Shimazaki	110.77	1	47.03	1	63.74
2	Kiria Hirayama / Kenta Higashi	94.90	3	38.50	2	56.40
3	Ayumi Takanami / Yosimitu Ikeda	94.66	2	39.33	3	55.33
4	Mai Kashino / Yuhi Kashino	82.82	4	35.32	4	47.50
5	Mirei Oda / Ryouto Yamauchi	61.62	5	26.88	5	34.74

== International team selections ==
The Japan Skating Federation selected skaters for international competitions in the second half of the 2017–18 season based on the results of the national championships as well as international ISU-sanctioned competitions.

=== Winter Olympics ===
The 2018 Winter Olympics will be held on February 9-25, 2018 in Pyeongchang, South Korea. Yuzuru Hanyu was chosen to compete despite missing the national championships, by virtue of his status as reigning World and Olympic champion, and his first place in the ISU World Standings at the time of the championships.

	Men	Ladies	Pairs	Ice dance
1	Yuzuru Hanyu	Satoko Miyahara	Miu Suzaki / Ryuichi Kihara	Kana Muramoto / Chris Reed
2	Shoma Uno	Kaori Sakamoto		
3	Keiji Tanaka			
1st alt.	Takahito Mura	Wakaba Higuchi	Narumi Takahashi / Ryo Shibata	
2nd alt.	Kazuki Tomono	Mai Mihara		
3rd alt.	Daisuke Murakami			

=== World Championships ===
The 2018 World Championships will be held on March 19-25, 2018 in Milan, Italy. Japan's entries were announced in late December 2017.

	Men	Ladies	Pairs	Ice dance
1	Yuzuru Hanyu	Satoko Miyahara	Miu Suzaki / Ryuichi Kihara	Kana Muramoto / Chris Reed
2	Shoma Uno	Wakaba Higuchi		
3	Keiji Tanaka			

=== Four Continents Championships ===
The 2018 Four Continents Championships will be held on January 22-28, 2018 in Taipei City, Chinese Taipei. Japan's entries were announced in late December 2017.

	Men	Ladies	Pairs	Ice dance
1	Keiji Tanaka	Satoko Miyahara	Riku Miura / Shoya Ichihashi	Kana Muramoto / Chris Reed
2	Takahito Mura	Kaori Sakamoto	Miu Suzaki / Ryuichi Kihara	Rikako Fukase / Aru Tateno
3	Shoma Uno	Mai Mihara	Narumi Takahashi / Ryo Shibata	Misato Komatsubara / Timothy Koleto

=== World Junior Championships ===
Commonly referred to as "Junior Worlds", the 2018 World Junior Championships will take place on March 5-11, 2018 in Sofia, Bulgaria. Japan's entries were announced in late December 2017.

	Men	Ladies	Pairs	Ice dancing
1	Mitsuki Sumoto	Rika Kihira	Riku Miura / Shoya Ichihashi	
2	Sena Miyake	Mako Yamashita		
3		Yuhana Yokoi		
