= Tim Koleto =

Japanese ice dancer (born 1991)

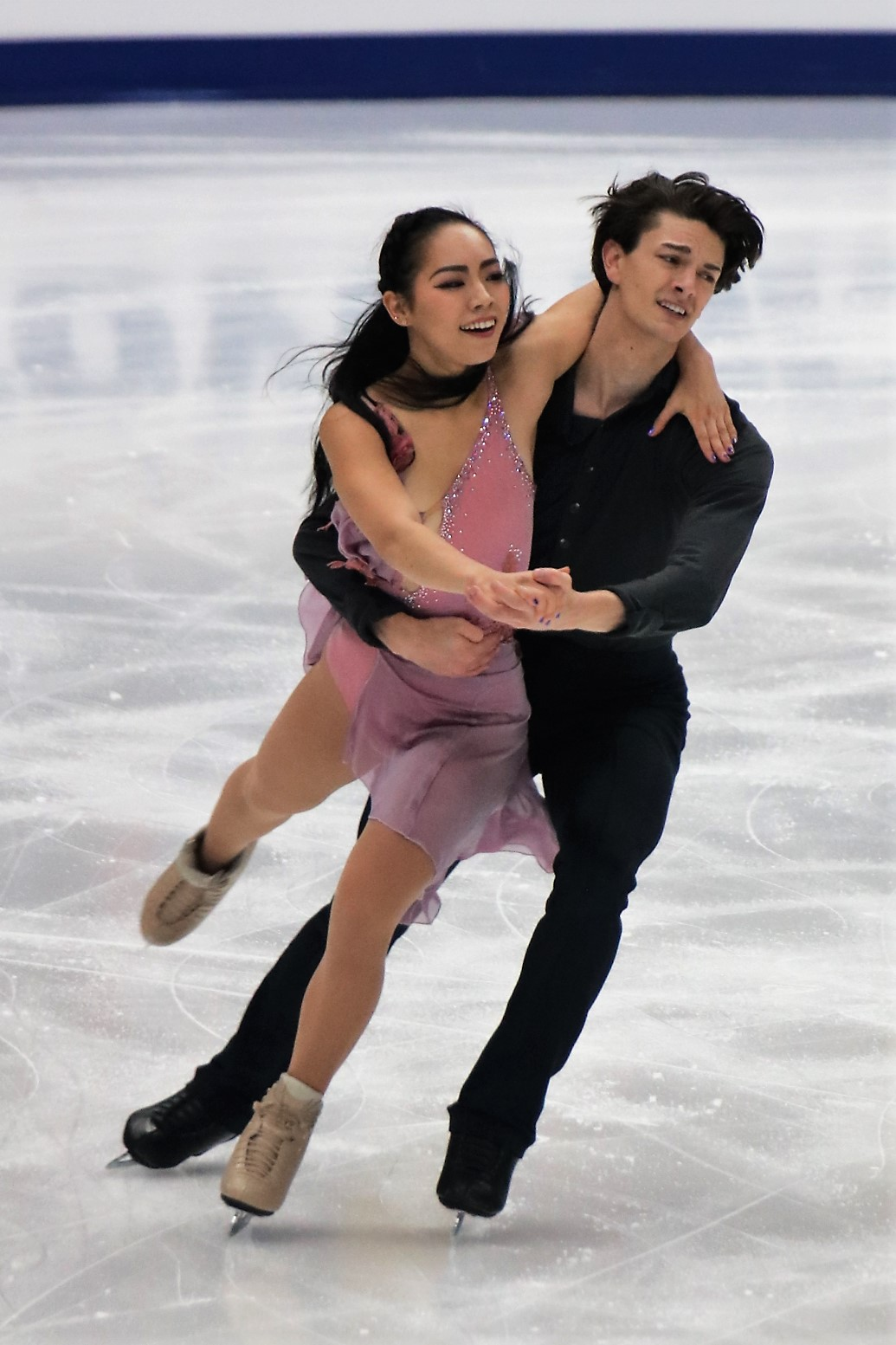
- Koleto and Komatsubara at the 2018 Rostelecom Cup

Personal information
- Full name: Timothy Koleto
- Other names: Takeru Komatsubara (小松原 尊)
- Born: June 17, 1991 (age 35) Kalispell, Montana, U.S.
- Height: 6 ft 2 in (1.87 m)

Figure skating career
- Country: Japan; Norway (2015–2016); South Korea (2013–2015); United States (until 2012)
- Discipline: Ice dance (2013–present); Men's singles (until 2012)
- Partner: Misato Komatsubara (2016–24); Thea Rabe (2015–2016); Yura Min (2013–2015)
- Coach: Marie-France Dubreuil; Patrice Lauzon; Romain Haguenauer; Rie Arikawa; Cathy Reed
- Skating club: Montreal International School of Skating
- Began skating: 1998
- Retired: January 28, 2025
- Highest WS: 28th (ice dance, 2021); not ranked (singles)
Event	Gold medal – first place	Silver medal – second place	Bronze medal – third place
Olympic Games	0	1	0
Japan Championships	5	2	1
South Korean Championships	1	0	0
World Team Trophy	0	1	1
Medal list
representing Japan
Olympic Games
Silver medal – second place	2022 Beijing	Team
Japan Championships
Gold medal – first place	2018–19 Osaka	Ice dance
Gold medal – first place	2019–20 Tokyo	Ice dance
Gold medal – first place	2020–21 Nagano	Ice dance
Gold medal – first place	2023–24 Nagano	Ice dance
Gold medal – first place	2021–22 Saitama	Ice dance
Silver medal – second place	2017–18 Tokyo	Ice dance
Silver medal – second place	2022–23 Osaka	Ice dance
Bronze medal – third place	2016–17 Osaka	Ice dance
World Team Trophy
Silver medal – second place	2019 Fukuoka	Team
Bronze medal – third place	2021 Tokyo	Team
Medal list
representing South Korea
South Korean Championships
Gold medal – first place	2014 Goyang	Ice dance

Timothy Koleto (小松原 尊, Komatsubara Takeru; born June 17, 1991) is a retired American-born ice dancer. Competing for Japan with his ice dance partner and ex-wife, Misato Komatsubara, they are the 2020 NHK Trophy gold medalists and five-time Japanese national champions (2018–21, 2023). Together, they also earned a silver medal from the team event at the 2022 Winter Olympics. (Note: On 29 January 2024, the CAS disqualified Valieva for four years retroactive to 25 December 2021 for an anti-doping rule violation. On 30 January 2024, the ISU reallocated medals to upgrade the United States to gold and Japan to silver, while downgrading the ROC to bronze.) Earlier in his career, Koleto competed with partner Yura Min for South Korea, winning the 2014 national title and placing tenth at the 2014 Four Continents. He also competed with Thea Rabe for Norway.

== Personal life ==
Koleto was born June 17, 1991, in Kalispell, Montana. He married Misato Komatsubara in January 2017 in Okayama, Japan.

Koleto became a Japanese citizen on November 19, 2020. Upon becoming a Japanese citizen, Koleto legally adopted the Komatsubara surname. Japanese law requires couples to share a surname, and he felt that "to be Japanese but ask my wife to change to a foreign surname I thought was quite strange." He chose the personal name Takeru after consulting his mother-in-law about what name she would have used if she had had another child. He studies and speaks Japanese. Koleto and Komatsubara ended their marriage on amicable terms in 2024, but remained ice dance partners.

In 2022, Koleto began sessions with a psychotherapist in Montreal, which unearthed memories that slipped "away into his subconscious, alongside other experiences that suggested being gay was anathema". Koleto has stated that his exposure to conversion therapy at the age of twenty-one and subsequent therapy helped inspire him to come out publicly. On June 1, 2023, Koleto came out as bisexual via Instagram.

== Career ==
=== Early years ===
Koleto began learning to skate in 1998. He worked with trainers in his hometown.

He placed 6th in the junior men's category at the 2012 U.S. Championships. In June 2012, he dislocated his knee and partially tore his hamstring and lateral collateral ligament while practicing a triple Axel jump . During practice in December, he twisted his ankle and tore the tibiofibular ligament.

=== Partnership with Min ===
==== 2013–14 season ====
Koleto switched to ice dancing and teamed up with Yura Min in April 2013. They placed 9th at the 2013 Ukrainian Open in December 2013. They were the only senior ice dance team competing at the 2014 South Korean Championships, and they won with a score of 105.49. Representing South Korea, the duo placed tenth at the 2014 Four Continents Championships. They placed tenth at the 2014 Bavarian Open.

==== 2014–15 season ====
They placed eighth at an ISU Challenger Series event, the 2014 CS Nebelhorn Trophy. They finished fifth at their last event together, the International Cup of Nice in October 2014. They were coached by Igor Shpilband and Greg Zuerlein in Novi, Michigan.

=== Partnership with Rabe ===
Koleto had tryouts with Norway's Thea Rabe in November 2014 in Lyon, France, and the following month in Novi, Michigan. They agreed to skate together for Norway. In May 2015, Rabe moved to the United States to train with Koleto. Igor Shpilband, Adrienne Lenda, Fabian Bourzat, and Greg Zuerlein coached the team in Novi, Michigan.

==== 2015–16 season ====
After being released by South Korea and sitting out one year, as required by the International Skating Union, Koleto became eligible to compete for Norway beginning October 20, 2015. Making their international debut, Rabe/Koleto won the bronze medal at the Volvo Open Cup in November 2015. They placed 8th at both the Open d'Andorra and the CS Warsaw Cup. Despite qualifying to the 2016 European Championships, they decided to end their partnership a few weeks before the event. They were Norway's first-ever ice dancing team.

=== Partnership with Komatsubara ===
==== 2016–17 season ====
Koleto teamed up with Misato Komatsubara following a tryout in Milan in April 2016. They decided to train together in Milan under Barbara Fusar-Poli. They received the bronze medal at the 2016–17 Japan Championships in December 2016.

==== 2017–18 season ====
Making their international debut for Japan, Komatsubara/Koleto placed 8th at the CS Lombardia Trophy in September 2017. They finished tenth at their sole Grand Prix event, the 2017 NHK Trophy. The two won the silver medal in December at the 2017–18 Japan Championships. They placed tenth at the 2018 Four Continents Championships with a historic personal best score of 138.18. They placed fourth at the 2018 Toruń Cup.

==== 2018–19 season ====
In March 2018, Komatsubara/Koleto announced that they had moved to Montreal, Quebec, Canada, to train under Marie-France Dubreuil, Patrice Lauzon, and Romain Haguenauer at the Gadbois Centre.

They won bronze at both of their ISU Challenger Series events, the 2018 CS Asian Open Trophy and 2018 CS US International Classic. They competed at two Grand Prix assignments, placing eighth at the 2018 NHK Trophy and eighth at the 2018 Rostelecom Cup.

Following the 2018 Rostelecom Cup, they moved to Japan to train (coached by Rie Arikawa) in order for Koleto to meet a residency requirement for a future citizenship application. At the 2018–19 Japanese Championships, they won the event after placing first in both segments. They placed ninth at the 2019 Four Continents Championships after placing ninth in both segments. Komatsubara/Koleto represented Japan at their first World Championships in 2019, held in Saitama, where they placed twenty-first in the rhythm dance, missing the free dance by one ordinal.

To conclude the season, they participated in the 2019 World Team Trophy as part of Team Japan, which won the silver medal. Komatsubara/Koleto placed sixth of six competitors in each of their segments. Komatsubara served as the Japanese team captain.

==== 2019–20 season ====
Initially scheduled to begin the season at the 2019 CS Autumn Classic International, Komatsubara/Koleto withdrew early in the preseason as a result of Komatsubara having sustained multiple concussions that required her to take time away from training. They later made their season debut at a different Challenger, the 2019 CS Asian Open, where they finished ninth. On the Grand Prix, they were tenth out of ten teams at the 2019 Cup of China. They withdrew from the 2019 NHK Trophy.

Returning to competition at the 2019–20 Japan Championships, they won their second consecutive national title. Komatsubara/Koleto finished eleventh at the 2020 Four Continents Championships. They were assigned to compete at the 2020 World Championships in Montreal, but these were canceled as a result of the coronavirus pandemic.

==== 2020–21 season ====
With the pandemic continuing to affect international travel, the ISU opted to base the Grand Prix primarily on the geographic location of competitors. Komatsubara/Koleto were assigned to compete at the 2020 NHK Trophy in a field consisting only of three Japanese dance teams, including the newly debuted pairing of former national champion Kana Muramoto and former Olympic medalist singles skater Daisuke Takahashi. The event occurred a week after Koleto successfully obtained Japanese citizenship, making the team eligible to represent Japan at the Winter Olympics. He said it was "great to share this moment with the Japanese audience." They placed first in the rhythm dance by more than six points. Winning the free dance as well, they took the title, the first Japanese dance team to win the NHK Trophy in its history.

Competing at the 2020–21 Japan Championships, Komatsubara/Koleto placed first in the rhythm dance, four points ahead of Muramoto/Takahashi. They won the free dance by almost twenty points, and took their third consecutive national title. Both the silver and bronze medalist teams made serious errors. Komatsubara/Koleto were named as Japan's representatives to the 2021 World Championships in Stockholm. They placed nineteenth, making the free dance for the first time. Komatsubara/Koleto's result qualified for a berth for a Japanese dance team at the 2022 Winter Olympics. They were the first Japanese team in 12 years to qualify directly from the World Championships.

Komatsubara/Koleto finished the season at the 2021 World Team Trophy, where they placed fifth in both of their segments of the competition, and Team Japan won the bronze medal.

==== 2021–22 season ====
In preparing their programs for the Olympic season, Komatsubara and Koleto chose a free dance to John Williams's score for Memoirs of a Geisha. Komatsubara felt "there were pieces of our story, pieces of our road, all inside of this music and in this movie."

Komatsubara/Koleto made their season debut at the 2021 Skate America, where they placed sixth. At their second event on the Grand Prix, the 2021 NHK Trophy, they finished in seventh place, 7.30 points behind domestic rivals Muramoto/Takahashi. Koleto said afterward, "there were a lot of things that didn’t go as we wanted them," but expressed satisfaction at having achieved new personal bests. He said their goal was to score over 180 points at the national championships.

The 2021–22 Japan Championships, the final national qualification event for the 2022 Winter Olympics, pitted Komatsubara/Koleto against Muramoto/Takahashi for the second time that season. They won the rhythm dance, and finished second in the free dance to win the title overall, and were subsequently named to the Japanese Olympic team.

Komatsubara/Koleto began the 2022 Winter Olympics as the Japanese entries in the rhythm dance segment of the Olympic team event. They placed seventh in the segment, securing four points for Team Japan. They finished fifth of the five dance teams in the free segment, taking six points for Japan. The Japanese team ultimately won the bronze medal, making the podium for the first time in the history of the team event. In the dance event, Komatsubara/Koleto finished twenty-second in the rhythm dance.

==== 2022–23 season ====
After placing seventh at the 2022 CS U.S. Classic, Komatsubara/Koleto were seventh as well at the 2022 Skate Canada International. They finished ninth at the 2022 NHK Trophy.

Komatsubara/Koleto won the silver medal at the 2022–23 Japan Championships, finishing behind Muramoto/Takahashi. Komatsubara said "we are disappointed about the result, but we had a lot of fun."

At the 2023 Four Continents Championships, Komatsubara/Koleto finished sixth in the rhythm dance and seventh overall, remaining ahead of their domestic rivals in both segments. They then finished fourth at the International Challenge Cup.

==== 2023–24 season ====
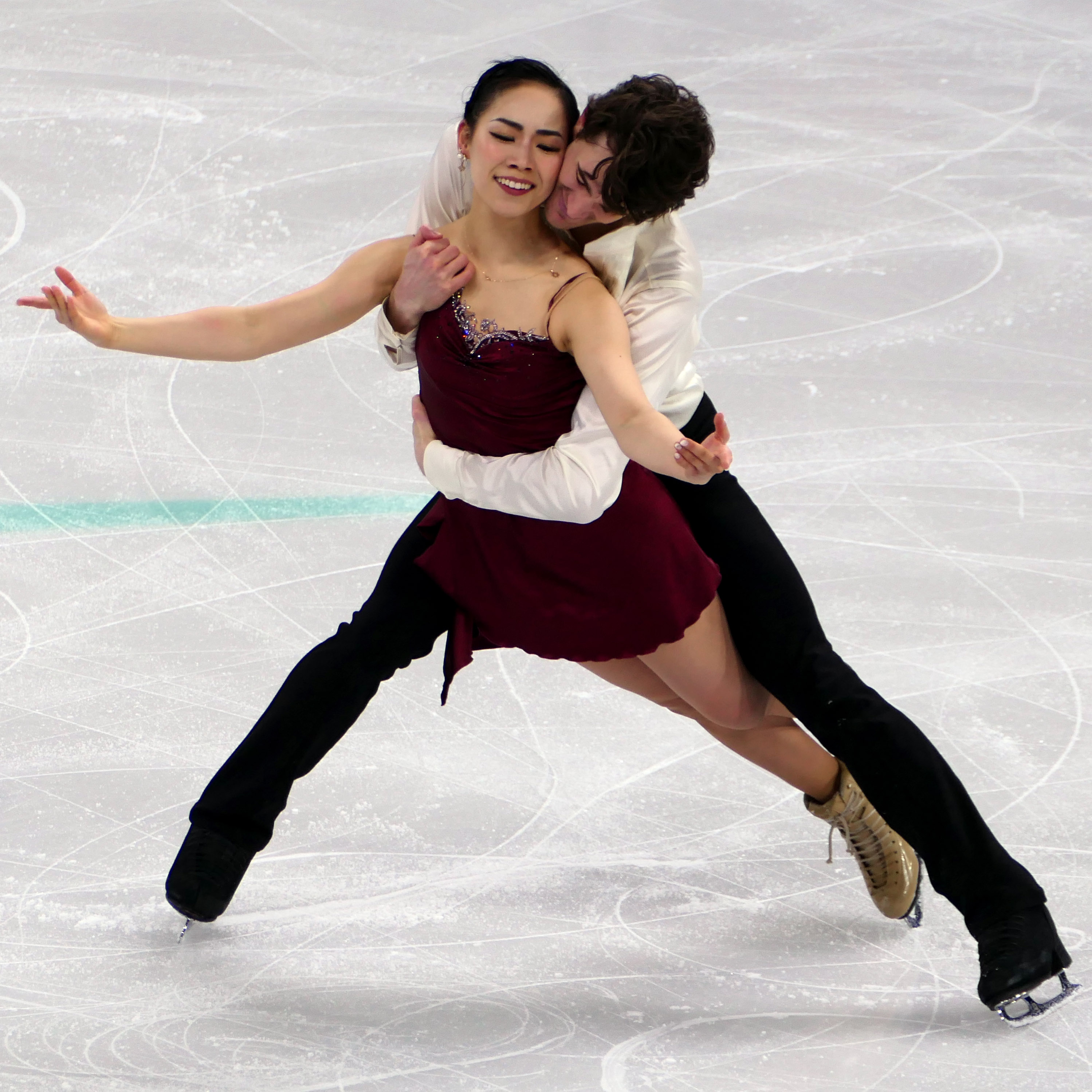
Komatsubara and Koleto during their free dance at the 2024 World Championships

Komatsubara/Koleto made their season debut at the 2023 NHK Trophy, placing ninth of nine teams in their lone international assignment of the fall. They next competed at the 2023–24 Japan Championships, which proved to be a tight contest between them and two other newer senior teams. They finished second in the rhythm dance behind Tanaka/Nishiyama, and second in the free dance behind Yoshida/Morita, but finished first overall, 1.96 points clear of Tanaka/Nishiyama. Remarking on the quality of the competition, Koleto said "I was emotional to see three Japanese ice dance teams fight for Japan."

With the close result at the national championships, the Japan Skating Federation opted to postpone assigning Japan's lone berth at the 2024 World Championships pending the results of all three teams at the 2024 Four Continents Championships. Traveling to Shanghai to compete, Komatsubara/Koleto finished eighth overall, outscoring their domestic rivals, and setting new personal bests. They finished sixth in the rhythm dance, achieving their goal of breaking the 70-point threshold in that segment.

Komatsubara/Koleto came twentieth in the rhythm dance at the World Championships, and were the final team to qualify for the free dance. They rose to eighteenth overall after that segment.

In April 2024, Misato Komatsubara announced that she had retired from competitive skating, citing injuries as the main reason, while Koleto was considering his options. In September 2024 Koleto joined the company Ice Dance International as a cast member.

During the 2024 Paris Olympics, a medal ceremony was held for Komatsubara/Koleto and their teammates from the 2022 Olympic Figure Skating Team Event, where they were awarded their Olympic silver medals. During the gala exhibition at the 2024 NHK Trophy, all members of the 2022 Olympic Team Event, including Komatsubara/Koleto, were invited to center stage, wearing their Olympic costumes and Olympic medals, in celebration of their achievement.

In January 2025, Koleto announced his retirement from competitive ice dancing.

== Programs ==
=== With Komatsubara ===
Season	Rhythm dance	Free dance	Exhibition
2023–2024	Ghostbusters by Ray Parker Jr.; True by Spandau Ballet choreo. by Romain Haguenauer, Marie-France Dubreuil, Ginette Cournoyer, Samuel Chouinard, Eva Airapetian	Loving You (from Passion) by Stephen Sondheim performed by Barbra Streisand, Patrick Wilson; Love Grows (from Final Fantasy VIII) by Nobuo Uematsu choreo. by Romain Haguenauer	Sakura Nagashi by Hikaru Utada
2022–2023	Loca by Shakira ft. Dizzee Rascal; Hay Amores by Shakira; La La La (Brazil 2014) by Shakira ft. Carlinhos Brown choreo. by Romain Haguenauer, Marie-France Dubreuil, Ginette Cournoyer, Samuel Chouinard, Eva Airapetian	The Fifth Element: Il dolce suono (Lucia di Lammermoor) by Gaetano Donizetti; The Diva Dance by Éric Serra choreo. by Romain Haguenauer, Marie-France Dubreuil, Ginette Cournoyer, Samuel Chouinard, Eva Airapetian	Filter by BTS; (You Drive Me) Crazy; Oops!... I Did It Again by Britney Spears
2021–2022	"Le Freak" by Chic; "What You Won't Do for Love" by Bobby Caldwell; You Make Me Feel (Mighty Real) by Sylvester choreo. by Ginette Cournoyer, Samuel Chouinard	Sayuri's Theme; Going to School; The Chairman's Waltz; Sayuri's Theme and End Credits (from Memoirs of a Geisha) by John Williams choreo. by Ginette Cournoyer, Samuel Chouinard	
2020–2021	Blues: Dreamgirls; Swing: One Night Only; Disco: Jimmy Got Soul (from Dreamgirls) by Henry Krieger & Tom Eyen choreo. by Marie-France Dubreuil, Romain Haguenauer	Une histoire d'amour performed by Mireille Mathieu choreo. by Marie-France Dubreuil, Romain Haguenauer	Umarekuru Kodomotachi no Tame ni by Kazumasa Oda
2019–2020	Blues: Dreamgirls; Swing: One Night Only; Disco: Jimmy Got Soul (from Dreamgirls) by Henry Krieger & Tom Eyen choreo. by Marie-France Dubreuil, Romain Haguenauer	Cry of the Celts; Suil a Ruin; The Lord of the Dance (from Lord of the Dance) by Ronan Hardiman choreo. by Marie-France Dubreuil, Romain Haguenauer	
2018–2019	Tango: El Sol Sueno by Gidon Kremer; Tango: Sueno de Barrilete by Susana Rinaldi choreo. by Marie-France Dubreuil, Romain Haguenauer	Une histoire d'amour performed by Mireille Mathieu choreo. by Marie-France Dubreuil, Romain Haguenauer	Your Name by RADWIMPS
	Short dance	Free dance	Exhibition
2017–2018	Salsa, Rhumba: Ahora Quien by Marc Anthony; Samba: Samba do Brasil (Radio Remix) by Bellini choreo. by Barbara Fusar-Poli	Where Is It Written? (from Yentl) by Barbra Streisand, Michel Legrand; End Credits (from Sabrina) by John Williams; A Piece of Sky (from Yentl) by Barbra Streisand, Michel Legrand choreo. by Barbara Fusar-Poli	
2016–2017	Mercy on Me; Candyman choreo. by Christopher Dean	Bohemian Rhapsody by Freddie Mercury choreo. by Christopher Dean	

=== With Rabe ===
Season	Short dance	Free dance
2015–2016	Cinderella by Sergei Prokofiev; Waltz: Cinderella's Departure for the Ball; March: Clock Scene; Waltz: Cinderella's Departure for the Ball choreo. by Barbara Fusar-Poli, Igor Shpilband	Peer Gynt by Edvard Grieg; Morning; In the Hall of the Mountain King choreo. by Igor Shpilband, Fabian Bourzat

=== With Min ===
Season	Short dance	Free dance
2014–2015	Flamenco: Lucia by Oscar Lopez; Paso doble: Malagueña; Flamenco: Fiesta Flamenca by Monty Kelly	Belleville Rendez-Vous; Under the Bridge; Theme Bruno by Benoît Charest; Suzy by Caravan Palace
2013–2014	Quickstep: Kap'n Kid; Foxtrot: Un mate in luca by Raphael Gualazzi; Quickstep: Kap'n Kid	Notre-Dame de Paris by Riccardo Cocciante

== Competitive highlights ==
GP: Grand Prix; CS: Challenger Series

=== With Komatsubara for Japan ===
International
Event	16–17	17–18	18–19	19–20	20–21	21–22	22–23	23–24
Olympics						22nd		
Worlds			21st	C	19th			18th
Four Continents		10th	9th	11th			7th	8th
GP Cup of China				10th				
GP NHK Trophy		10th	8th	WD	1st	7th	9th	9th
GP Rostelecom			8th					
GP Skate America						6th		
GP Skate Canada							7th	
CS Asian Open			3rd	9th		WD		
CS Autumn Classic				WD				
CS Lombardia		8th						
CS U.S. Classic			3rd				7th	
CS Warsaw Cup						WD		
Challenge Cup							4th	
Toruń Cup		4th						
National
Japan Champ.	3rd	2nd	1st	1st	1st	1st	2nd	1st
Western Sect.	2nd	1st			1st			
Team events
Olympics						2nd T		
World Team Trophy			2nd T 6th P		3rd T 5th P			
TBD = Assigned; WD = Withdrew; C = Event cancelled T = Team result; P = Personal result. Medals awarded for team result only.

=== With Rabe for Norway ===
International
Event	2015–16
CS Warsaw Cup	8th
Volvo Open Cup	3rd
Open d'Andorra	8th

=== With Min for South Korea ===
International
Event	2013–14	2014–15
Four Continents Champ.	10th	
CS Nebelhorn Trophy		8th
Bavarian Open	10th	
Cup of Nice		5th
Ukrainian Open	9th	
National
South Korean Champ.	1st	

=== Men's singles ===
National
Event	07–08	08–09	09–10	10–11	11–12	12–13
U.S. Championships			11th N	10th J	6th J	
Midwestern Sectionals			4th N	3rd J	1st J	5th
Southwestern Regionals	5th N	7th N	2nd N			
Levels: N = Novice; J = Junior

== Detailed results ==
ISU personal best scores in the +5/-5 GOE System
Segment	Type	Score	Event
Total	**TSS**	**182.70**	2024 Four Continents Championships
Short program	**TSS**	**71.29**	2024 Four Continents Championships
Short program	TES	40.26	2024 Four Continents Championships
Short program	PCS	31.03	2024 Four Continents Championships
Free skating	**TSS**	**111.41**	2024 Four Continents Championships
Free skating	TES	63.05	2024 Four Continents Championships
Free skating	PCS	48.36	2024 Four Continents Championships

=== With Komatsubara for Japan ===
ISU personal best scores highlighted in bold. Historic (i.e., before the 2018–19 season) ISU personal best scores highlighted in bold and italicized.

2023–2024 season
Date	Event	RD	FD	Total
March 18–24, 2024	2024 World Championships	20; 66.92	17; 106.98	18; 173.90
Jan. 30 – Feb. 4, 2024	2024 Four Continents Championships	6; **71.29**	8; **111.41**	8; **182.70**
December 20–24, 2023	2023–24 Japan Championships	2; 70.89	2; 107.50	1; 178.39
November 24–26, 2023	2023 NHK Trophy	9; 64.12	8; 103.49	9; 167.61
2022–23 season
Date	Event	RD	FD	Total
February 23–26, 2023	2023 Challenge Cup	4; 68.78	5; 97.92	4; 166.70
February 7–12, 2023	2023 Four Continents Championships	6; 66.72	8; 98.99	7; 165.71
December 21–25, 2022	2022–23 Japan Championships	2; 69.96	2; 105.14	2; 175.10
November 17–20, 2022	2022 NHK Trophy	8; 66.65	9; 97.65	9; 164.30
October 28–30, 2022	2022 Skate Canada	7; 68.88	7; 97.18	7; 166.06
September 13–16, 2022	2022 U.S.Classic	7; 60.38	7; 95.56	7; 155.94
**2021–22 season**
Date	Event	RD	FD	Total
February 12–14, 2022	2022 Winter Olympics	22; 65.41	—	22; 65.41
February 4–7, 2022	2022 Winter Olympics — Team event	7; 66.54	5; 98.66	2T
December 22–26, 2021	2021–22 Japan Championships	1; 68.16	2; 110.01	1; 178.17
November 12–14, 2021	2021 NHK Trophy	7; 68.13	7; 104.07	7; 172.20
October 22–24, 2021	2021 Skate America	7; 63.56	6; 100.76	6; 164.32
2020–21 season
Date	Event	RD	FD	Total
April 15–18, 2021	2021 World Team Trophy	5; 66.42	5; 100.82	3T/5P; 167.24
March 22–28, 2021	2021 World Championships	18; 68.02	20; 99.79	19; 167.81
December 24–27, 2020	2020–21 Japan Championships	1; 71.74	1; 103.49	1; 175.23
November 27–29, 2020	2020 NHK Trophy	1; 70.76	1; 108.29	1; 179.05
2019–20 season
Date	Event	SD	FD	Total
February 4 – 9, 2020	2020 Four Continents Championships	11; 61.45	10; 95.75	11; 157.20
December 18–22, 2019	2019–20 Japan Championships	1; 63.79	1; 99.52	1; 163.31
November 8–10, 2019	2019 Cup of China	10; 56.60	10; 88.75	10; 145.35
October 30 - November 3, 2019	2019 CS Asian Open Trophy	9; 55.39	9; 86.70	9; 142.09
2018–19 season
Date	Event	RD	FD	Total
April 11–14, 2019	2019 World Team Trophy	6; 60.93	6; 99.31	2T/6P; 160.24
March 18–24, 2019	2019 World Championships	21; 60.98	-	21; 60.98
February 7–10, 2019	2019 Four Continents Championships	9; 54.94	9; 94.20	9; 149.14
December 20–24, 2018	2018–19 Japan Championships	1; 52.21	1; 100.39	1; 152.60
November 16–18, 2018	2018 Rostelecom Cup	8; 52.99	8; 90.29	8; 143.28
November 9–11, 2018	2018 NHK Trophy	9; 59.40	8; 94.87	8; 154.27
September 12–16, 2018	2018 CS US International Classic	4; 53.42	3; 89.51	3; 142.93
August 1–5, 2018	2018 CS Asian Open Trophy	3; 61.28	2; 93.47	3; 154.75
2017–18 season
Date	Event	SD	FD	Total
Jan. 30–Feb. 4, 2018	2018 Toruń Cup	4; 58.90	4; 88.96	4; 147.86
January 22–28, 2018	2018 Four Continents Championships	10; 52.45	9; 85.73	10; 138.18
December 20–24, 2017	2017–18 Japan Championships	2; 56.65	2; 92.82	2; 149.47
November 10–12, 2017	2017 NHK Trophy	10; 53.83	10; 78.58	10; 132.41
September 14–17, 2017	2017 CS Lombardia Trophy	9; 49.80	6; 78.48	8; 128.28
2016–17 season
December 22–25, 2016	2016–17 Japan Championships	3; 51.47	3; 73.85	3; 125.12

=== With Rabe for Norway ===
2015–16 season
Date	Event	SD	FD	Total
November 27–29, 2015	2015 CS Warsaw Cup	8; 42.66	8; 65.14	8; 107.80
November 19–22, 2015	2015 Open d'Andorra	6; 47.63	8; 61.31	8; 108.94
November 4–8, 2015	2015 Volvo Open Cup	4; 47.96	4; 74.07	3; 122.03

=== With Min for South Korea ===
2014–15 season
Date	Event	SD	FD	Total
October 15–19, 2014	2014 International Cup of Nice	6; 40.04	4; 68.84	5; 108.88
September 24–27, 2014	2014 CS Nebelhorn Tropy	8; 40.10	8; 63.36	8; 103.46
2013–14 season
Date	Event	SD	FD	Total
January 29–February 2, 2014	2014 Bavarian Open	10; 44.53	10; 65.68	10; 110.21
January 22–28, 2018	2014 Four Continents Championships	8; 45.12	10; 66.11	10; 111.23
January 3–5, 2014	2014 South Korean Championships	1; 41.64	1; 63.85	1; 105.49
December 18–20, 2013	2013 Ukrainian Open	8; 41.26	10; 63.43	9; 104.69
