= Chris Reed (figure skater) =

American Japanese ice dancer (1989–2020)

Chris Reed クリス・リード
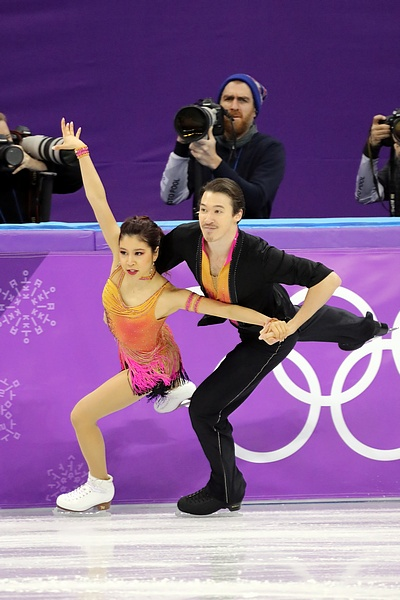
- Reed with Muramoto at the 2018 Winter Olympics

Personal information
- Born: July 7, 1989 Kalamazoo, Michigan, U.S.
- Died: March 14, 2020 (aged 30) Detroit, Michigan, U.S.
- Home town: Warren Township, New Jersey, U.S.
- Height: 6 ft 1 in (1.85 m)

Figure skating career
- Country: Japan
- Coach: Marina Zueva, Oleg Epstein, Massimo Scali, Johnny Johns
- Skating club: Arctic Edge FSC; Kinoshita Club Tokyo
- Began skating: 1994
- Retired: December 31, 2019
Event	Gold medal – first place	Silver medal – second place	Bronze medal – third place
Four Continents Championships	0	0	1
Japan Championships	10	1	0
World Team Trophy	2	0	3
Medal list
Four Continents Championships
Bronze medal – third place	2018 Taipei	Ice dance
Japan Championships
Gold medal – first place	2007–08 Osaka	Ice dance
Gold medal – first place	2008–09 Nagano	Ice dance
Gold medal – first place	2009–10 Osaka	Ice dance
Gold medal – first place	2010–11 Nagano	Ice dance
Gold medal – first place	2012–13 Sapporo	Ice dance
Gold medal – first place	2013–14 Saitama	Ice dance
Gold medal – first place	2014–15 Nagano	Ice dance
Gold medal – first place	2015–16 Sapporo	Ice dance
Gold medal – first place	2016–17 Osaka	Ice dance
Gold medal – first place	2017–18 Tokyo	Ice dance
Silver medal – second place	2006–07 Nagoya	Ice dance
World Team Trophy
Gold medal – first place	2012 Tokyo	Team
Gold medal – first place	2017 Tokyo	Team
Bronze medal – third place	2009 Tokyo	Team
Bronze medal – third place	2013 Tokyo	Team
Bronze medal – third place	2015 Tokyo	Team

Japanese name
- Kana: クリス・リード

Robert Christopher Reed (July 7, 1989 – March 14, 2020) was an American-born Japanese ice dancer. With his sister Cathy Reed, he became a seven-time Japanese national champion (2008–2011, 2013–2015) and the 2011 Asian Winter Games silver medalist. They competed at two Winter Olympics (2010, 2014) and reached the final segment at nine ISU Championships.

With Kana Muramoto, Reed was the 2018 Four Continents bronze medalist, the 2017 Asian Winter Games silver medalist and a three-time Japanese national champion (2016–2018). They competed in the final segment at five ISU Championships and the 2018 Winter Olympics.

== Early life ==
Chris Reed was born in Kalamazoo, Michigan. His mother was Japanese and his father was American. Reed had two skating siblings: his elder sister, Cathy, with whom he competed in ice dancing; and his younger sister Allison Reed, who is also an ice dancer. The siblings grew up in Warren Township, New Jersey. Reed acquired Japanese and American dual citizenship at birth until the age of 21, when he chose to retain Japanese citizenship, since Japanese nationality law only recognizes dual nationality until the age of 21.

== Career ==
=== Partnership with Cathy Reed ===
Chris and Cathy Reed initially began with singles skating, before deciding to skate together when Cathy was 12. They approached Shae-Lynn Bourne and she became their coach, along with Nikolai Morozov, who choreographed their first program. They trained in Hackensack, New Jersey. The Reeds won the novice ice dancing title at the 2006 U.S. Championships. They decided to represent Japan beginning in the 2006–07 season. While novice national champions are usually given a chance to compete on the Junior Grand Prix, Cathy Reed was too old at the time of their win to compete as a junior internationally. The Reeds accepted an offer to compete for Japan, advancing immediately to the senior level.

After advancing to the senior level, they placed fourth at the 2006 Golden Spin of Zagreb, and second at the 2007 Japan Championships behind Nozomi Watanabe and Akiyuki Kido. At the 2007 Four Continents, they placed 7th, ahead of several teams who had been competing as seniors much longer.

Reed underwent knee surgery twice after tearing the meniscus in his knee, and later tearing the medial collateral ligament. He was off the ice for five months.

Making their Grand Prix debut, the Reeds placed 9th at the 2007 Skate America and 8th at the 2007 NHK Trophy. They won the Japanese national championships. They repeated their 7th-place finish at the Four Continents, and then placed 16th at the 2008 Worlds. They represented Japan at the 2010 Winter Olympics in Vancouver, finishing in 17th place. They won the silver medal at the 2011 Asian Winter Games.

The Reeds finished 5th at both the NHK Trophy and Skate America during the 2012–13 season. They were named in the Japanese team to the 2014 Winter Olympics in Sochi, and 2015 Worlds, where they finished outside the top 20.

After the 2014–15 figure skating season, Cathy Reed retired from competitive figure skating.

=== 2015–2016 season: Beginning of partnership with Muramoto ===
On June 17, 2015, Reed and Kana Muramoto announced that they would compete together, coached by Marina Zueva, Oleg Epstein, and Massimo Scali in Canton, Michigan.

Making their international debut, Muramoto/Reed placed 7th at the 2015 NHK Trophy in November. The following month, they won the Japanese national title. In January 2016, the duo took silver at the Toruń Cup in Poland. They placed 7th at the 2016 Four Continents Championships in February in Taipei, Taiwan. In March, they placed 16th in the short dance, 14th in the free dance, and 15th overall at the 2016 World Championships in Boston, Massachusetts.

=== 2016–2017 season ===
Muramoto/Reed won silver at the 2016 CS U.S. Classic in September with personal best scores, and placed 8th at the 2016 Skate America in October. They withdrew from the 2016 NHK Trophy due to a knee injury Reed suffered two weeks prior. After winning their second national title, the duo took bronze at the 2017 Toruń Cup.

In February, Muramoto/Reed placed 9th at the 2017 Four Continents Championships in Gangneung, South Korea, and won silver at the 2017 Asian Winter Games in Sapporo, Japan. In March, they placed 23rd in the short dance at the 2017 World Championships in Helsinki, Finland. As a result, they did not advance to the final segment and missed qualifying for the Olympics.

=== 2017–2018 season ===
Muramoto/Reed began their season in September, taking bronze at the 2017 CS U.S. Classic. At the end of the month, they competed at the 2017 Nebelhorn Trophy, the final qualifying opportunity for the Olympics. The two won the silver medal and secured an Olympic spot for Japan. In November, they appeared at a pair of Grand Prix events, finishing 9th at the 2018 NHK Trophy and 7th at the 2017 Skate America. They then won their third national title, outscoring the silver medalists by nearly 17 points.

In January, Muramoto/Reed won the bronze medal at the 2018 Four Continents Championships in Taipei, Taiwan. In February, they competed at the 2018 Winter Olympics in PyeongChang, South Korea. They placed 15th in the short dance, 13th in the free dance, and 15th overall. The following month, they finished 11th at the 2018 World Championships in Milan, Italy, which was the best result of any Japanese ice team.

=== 2018–2019 season ===
Muramoto/Reed were assigned to the 2018 NHK Trophy and 2018 Rostelecom Cup. However, on August 9, 2018, Japanese news media reported that they had ended their partnership. The Japanese federation confirmed the split, which Muramoto attributed to "differences in direction". Both Muramoto and Reed planned to seek new partners and continue competing. Reed posted a statement on his social media: "I am hugely disappointed with how this partnership has ended, but regardless I am in great physical condition now, I'm not done yet, I do plan on continuing the pursuit of achieving greater heights for Japan in ice dance. I would like to thank everyone involved, your support will never be forgotten and I will work even harder. And for Kana I wish her all the best in her future endeavors." On December 31, 2019, Reed announced his retirement.

== Death ==
On March 17, 2020, Reed's sister Allison announced on social media that he had died. The Japan Skating Federation confirmed Reed died in Detroit, Michigan, on March 14, 2020, due to sudden cardiac arrest. President of the JSF, Akihisa Nagashima paid tribute to him: "I am absolutely stunned by the sad news. I would like to offer my deepest appreciation to Chris Reed for his contribution to Japanese ice dancing over the years and extend condolences to his family. May Mr. Reed rest in peace."

A memorial service was held at a Michigan funeral home on March 21, 2020, and was publicly live-streamed on numerous platforms. Reed's sister Cathy paid tribute to him in both Japanese and English: "I miss your voice. I miss your big smile. I miss holding your hand. But I'll be strong for you, Chris."

== Programs ==
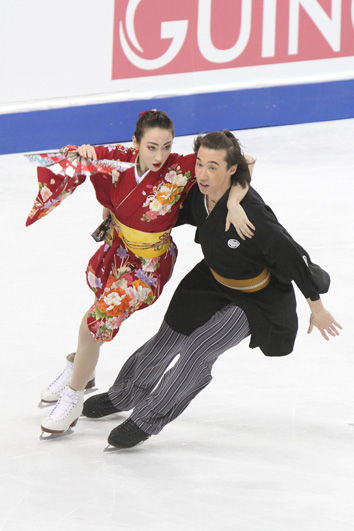
Chris and Cathy Reed at the 2010 World Figure Skating Championships

=== With Kana Muramoto ===
Season	Short dance	Free dance	Exhibition
2017–2018	Cha Cha: I Like It Like That by Tony Pabon, Manny Rodriguez performed by Pete Rodriguez; Rhumba: Mondo Bongo by Joe Strummer; Samba: Batucada de Sambrasil by Estudios Talkback	The Last Emperor; Merry Christmas, Mr. Lawrence by Ryuichi Sakamoto	Ryuichi Sakamoto medley: The Last Emperor; Merry Christmas, Mr. Lawrence; Unsteady X Ambassadors
2016–2017	Ray Charles medley: Blues: The Sun's Gonna Shine Again; Jive: I Got a Woman; Swing: Mess Around performed by Ray Charles	Poeta medley: Poeta en el Puerto; Amor Dulce Muerte; Nada Puede Dormir; Poeta en el Viento by Vicente Amigo	All I Need is the Girl by Jule Styne
2015–2016	Robert Stolz medley: Waltz: Wiener Café; March: Olympiamarsch; March: UNO-Marsch by Robert Stolz	Pennies from Heaven by Johnny Burke, Arthur Johnston; Jubilee Stomp by Duke Ellington; The Reel Chaplin: A Symphonic Adventure by Carl Davis; Limelight by Charlie Chaplin, Thomas Beckmann	Everything Has Changed by Taylor Swift, Ed Sheeran

=== With Cathy Reed ===
Season	Short dance	Free dance	Exhibition
2014–2015	Flamenco: El Cid: Farruca by Thomas Hickstein, Elva La Guardia; Paso Doble: Gato Montes by Hugo Montenegro	Moon River; Mr. Lucky; The Big Blow Out by Henry Mancini	River Flows in You by Yiruma
2013–2014	Quickstep: Puttin' On the Ritz by Irving Berlin; Foxtrot: Harlem Nocturne by Earle Hagen; Quickstep: Puttin' On the Ritz by Irving Berlin	Ona Hei (from Total War: Shogun 2) by Jeff van Dyck; Bitter Sweet Water (from Hell Girl Mitsuganae) by Hiromi Mizutani; Good Death; Ona Hei (from Total War: Shogun 2) by Jeff van Dyck	The Prayer by Celine Dion, Andrea Bocelli; Onmyoji by Shigeru Umebayashi
2012–2013	Seven Brides for Seven Brothers; June Bride; Barn Dance	The Beatles; Golden Slumbers; Carry that Weight; The End	The Prayer by Celine Dion, Andrea Bocelli
2011–2012	La Llama by Chris Ice; Whatever Happens by Michael Jackson; Drums by Basic J	Chale Chalo (from Lagaan) by A. R. Rahman; Mon Amour by David Visan; Chale Chalo (from Lagaan) by A. R. Rahman	
2010–2011	The Addams Family by Marc Shaiman; Party ... For Me?; The Tango	Just for a Little While by Smokin' Joe Kubek Band; Ain't No Sunshine by Al Jarreau; Think by Aretha Franklin (from The Blues Brothers)	
	Original dance		
2009–2010	Japanese: Sakura; Kodo	Angels & Demons by Joshua Bell, Hans Zimmer	
2008–2009	Charleston: Money, Money (from Cabaret soundtrack)	Il Mirto E La Rosa by Alessandro Safina	
2007–2008	Zorba the Greek by Mikis Theodorakis	Prayer in the Night (modern arrangement of Handel's Suite No. 4)	
2006–2007	Tango Jalousie; Libertango by Astor Piazzolla	Prayer in the Night (modern arrangement of Handel's Suite No. 4)	
2005–2006		Concierto de Aranjuez by Joaquín Rodrigo	
2003–2005		Libertango by Bond	
2001–2002		Chicago by Kander and Ebb	

== Competitive highlights ==
GP: Grand Prix; CS: Challenger Series; JGP: Junior Grand Prix

=== With Kana Muramoto for Japan ===
International
Event	15–16	16–17	17–18	18–19
Olympics			15th	
Worlds	15th	23rd	11th	
Four Continents	7th	9th	3rd	
GP Rostelecom				WD
GP NHK Trophy	7th	WD	9th	WD
GP Skate America		8th	7th	
CS Nebelhorn			2nd	
CS U.S. Classic		2nd	3rd	
Asian Games		2nd		
Toruń Cup	2nd	3rd		
National
Japanese Champ.	1st	1st	1st	
Team events
Olympics			5th T 5th P	
World Team; Trophy		1st T 5th P		
WD = Withdrew; T = Team result; P = Personal result. Medals awarded for team result only.

=== With Cathy Reed for Japan ===
International
Event	06–07	07–08	08–09	09–10	10–11	11–12	12–13	13–14	14–15
Olympics				17th				21st	
Worlds		16th	16th	15th	13th	24th	20th	18th	22nd
Four Continents	7th	7th	WD				7th		
GP NHK Trophy		8th	8th	7th	7th	7th	5th	6th	6th
GP Skate America		9th			7th			5th	
Golden Spin	4th			5th					
Nebelhorn Trophy						4th			
NRW Trophy							2nd		
Toruń Cup							2nd		
Asian Games					2nd				
National
Japanese Champ.	2nd	1st	1st	1st	1st	WD	1st	1st	1st
Team events
Olympics								5th T	
World Team; Trophy			3rd T 5th P			1st T 6th P	3rd T 4th P		3rd T 6th P
WD = Withdrew; T = Team result; P = Personal result. Medals awarded for team result only.
