= Mitsuki Sumoto =

Japanese figure skater (born 2001)

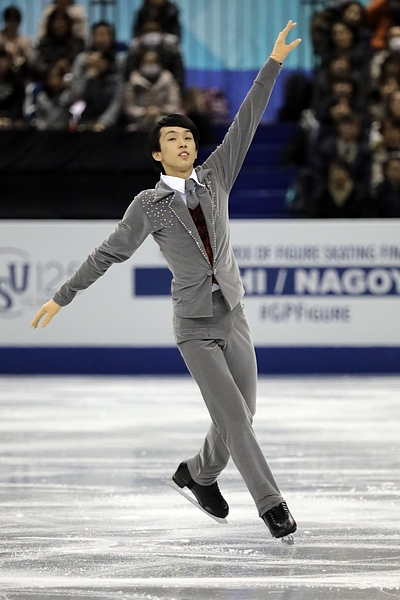

Personal information
- Native name: 須本 光希
- Born: February 4, 2001 (age 25) Izumiotsu, Osaka, Japan
- Home town: Izumiōtsu, Osaka, Japan
- Height: 1.64 m (5 ft 4 1/2 in)

Figure skating career
- Country: Japan
- Coach: Yoshinori Onishi
- Skating club: Uenoshiba SC, Sakai City
- Began skating: 2005
- Retired: 2022
Medal record
Representing Japan
Figure skating: Men's singles
Junior Grand Prix Final
Bronze medal – third place	2017–18 Nagoya	Men's singles

Mitsuki Sumoto (須本光希, Sumoto Mitsuki; born 4 February 2001) is a Japanese former competitive figure skater. He is the 2017–18 Junior Grand Prix Final bronze medalist, the 2017 JGP Latvia champion, and the 2017–18 Japanese junior national champion. He finished within the top ten at the 2018 World Junior Championships.

== Personal life ==
Sumoto was born on 4 February 2001 in Izumiotsu, Osaka, Japan.

His figure skating idol is Yuzuru Hanyu.

== Career ==
=== Early career ===
Competing at the Japan Novice Championships, Sumoto placed 10th in the 2011–12 season, 12th in 2012–13, and 8th in 2013–14.

During the 2015–16 figure skating season, Sumoto debuted on the ISU Junior Grand Prix circuit, placing 7th in Colorado Springs, Colorado. The following season, he placed fifth in Ostrava, Czech Republic, before winning a bronze medal in Dresden, Germany.

=== 2017–18 season ===
Sumoto started the 2017–18 season with a gold medal at 2017 JGP Latvia and a 4th-place finish at 2017 JGP Croatia. His results qualified him for the 2017-18 Junior Grand Prix Final. He won the 2017–18 Japanese Junior National title in November, placing first in both segments of the competition. At the 2017–18 Junior Grand Prix Final, Sumoto won the bronze medal, placing third in both the short program and the free skate.

He placed 6th on the senior level at the 2017-18 Japan Figure Skating Championships and was assigned to the 2018 World Junior Figure Skating Championships, where he placed third in the short program and ninth in the free skate, finishing in ninth place overall. Sumoto revealed that he had injured his ankle in mid-February during training and competed while taking painkillers.

=== 2018–19 season ===
Sumoto started his season at the beginning of August, with a 4th-place finish on the senior level at 2018 CS Asian Trophy. He went on to take the silver medal at JGP Slovakia.

=== 2020–21 season ===
Sumoto was assigned to compete at the 2020 NHK Trophy but withdrew with a fever. He was later diagnosed with gastroenteritis. He subsequently competed at the 2020–21 Japan Championships, placing fourteenth.

=== 2021–22 season ===
Sumoto placed fifteenth at the 2021–22 Japan Championships.

=== 2022–23 season ===
After coming twenty-fourth at the 2022–23 Japan Championships, Sumoto announced his decision to retire from competitive skating.

== Programs ==
Season	Short program	Free skating
2022–2023	The Feeling Begins by Peter Gabriel choreo. by Nanami Abe	Mi Mancherai (Il Postino) by Luis Bacalov Josh Groban choreo. by Nanami Abe
2021–2022	Forever Ain't Enough by Ronan Keating choreo. by :Keisuke Kodaira	Un Giorno per Noi (from Romeo and Juliet) by Josh Groban choreo. by Nanami Abe
2020–2021	The Feeling Begins choreo. by Nanami Abe	The Mission by Ennio Morricone choreo. by Nanami Abe
2019–2020	The Feeling Begins choreo. by Nanami Abe	Mi Mancherai by Josh Groban
2018–2019	Tosca by Giacomo Puccini	Mi Mancherai by Josh Groban
2017–2018	Singin' in the Rain by Nacio Herb Brown	Les Misérables by Claude-Michel Schoenberg
2016–2017	Singin' in the Rain by Nacio Herb Brown	Piano Sonata No. 8, Op. 13 by Ludwig van Beethoven; movement 1; movement 2; Etude Op. 8-12 by Alexander Scriabin
2015–2016	Caprice No. 5 by Niccolò Paganini	Piano Sonata No. 8, Op. 13 Movement 1 by Ludwig van Beethoven

== Competitive highlights ==
=== 2016-17 to Present ===
GP: Grand Prix; CS: Challenger Series; JGP: Junior Grand Prix

International
Event	15–16	16–17	17–18	18–19	19–20	20–21	21–22	22–23
CS Asian Open				4th				
CS Ondrej Nepela					5th			
International: Junior
Junior Worlds			9th					
JGP Final			3rd					
JGP Croatia			4th					
JGP Czech Rep.		5th		5th				
JGP Germany		3rd						
JGP Latvia			1st					
JGP Slovakia				2nd				
JGP USA	7th							
Asian Trophy	1st							
National
Japan	14th	13th	6th		8th	14th	15th	24th
Japan Junior	6th	3rd	1st	7th				
TBD = Assigned; WD = Withdrew; Levels: J = Junior

== Detailed results ==
=== Senior level ===
2022–23 season
Date	Event	SP	FS	Total
December 21–25, 2022	2022–23 Japan Championships	23; 61.07	23; 111.33	24; 172.40
2021–22 season
Date	Event	SP	FS	Total
December 22–26, 2021	2021–22 Japan Championships	17; 68.55	13; 131.07	15; 199.62
2020–21 season
Date	Event	SP	FS	Total
December 24–27, 2020	2020–21 Japan Championships	15; 67.15	14; 126.22	14; 193.37
2019–20 season
Date	Event	SP	FS	Total
December 18–22, 2019	2019–20 Japan Championships	12; 72.81	8; 147.47	8; 220.28

=== Junior level ===
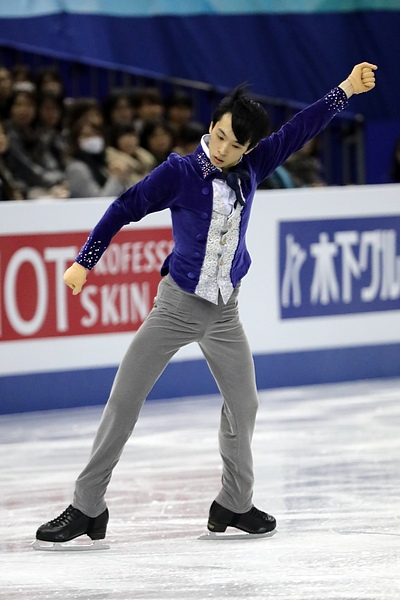
Sumoto at the 2017–18 Junior Grand Prix Final

Small medals are awarded at ISU championships only. Personal bests highlighted in bold.

2018–19 season
Date	Event	Level	SP	FS	Total
November 23–25, 2018	2018–19 Japan Junior Championships	Junior	5; 69.89	8; 122.99	7; 192.88
September 26–29, 2018	2018 JGP Czech Republic	Junior	5; 67.85	3; 133.70	5; 201.55
August 22–25, 2018	2018 JGP Slovakia	Junior	2; 74.13	2; 136.18	2; 210.31
August 1–5, 2018	2018 CS Asian Trophy	Senior	3; 63.65	4; 118.74	4; 182.39
2017–18 season
Date	Event	Level	SP	FS	Total
March 5–11, 2018	2018 World Junior Championships	Junior	3; 72.94	9; 126.57	9; 199.51
December 21–24, 2017	2017–18 Japan Championships	Senior	7; 72.93	6; 152.83	6; 225.76
December 7–10, 2017	2017–18 Junior Grand Prix Final	Junior	3; **77.10**	3; 137.35	3; **214.45**
November 24–26, 2017	2017–18 Japan Junior Championships	Junior	1; 67.34	1; 130.85	1; 198.19
September 27–30, 2017	2017 JGP Croatia	Junior	3; 73.18	4; 134.36	4; 207.54
September 6–9, 2017	2017 JGP Latvia	Junior	4; 63.25	1; **140.26**	1; 203.51
2016–17 season
Date	Event	Level	SP	FS	Total
December 22–25, 2016	2016–17 Japan Championships	Senior	12; 60.97	14; 117.63	13; 178.60
November 18–20, 2016	2016–17 Japan Junior Championships	Junior	3; 63.60	3; 128.21	3; 191.81
October 5–8, 2016	2016 JGP Germany	Junior	4; 65.11	3; 130.63	3; 195.74
August 31–September 3, 2016	2016 JGP Czech Republic	Junior	5; 63.72	5; 129.41	5; 193.13
2015–16 season
Date	Event	Level	SP	FS	Total
December 24–27, 2015	2015–16 Japan Championships	Senior	18; 58.11	14; 118.21	14; 176.32
November 21–23, 2015	2015–16 Japan Junior Championships	Junior	6; 58.82	6; 111.05	6; 169.87
September 2–5, 2015	2015 JGP United States	Junior	9; 56.35	7; 112.09	7; 168.44
August 5–8, 2015	2015 Asian Open Trophy	Junior	1; 53.51	1; 109.80	1; 163.31
