= Misato Komatsubara =

Japanese ice dancer (born 1992)

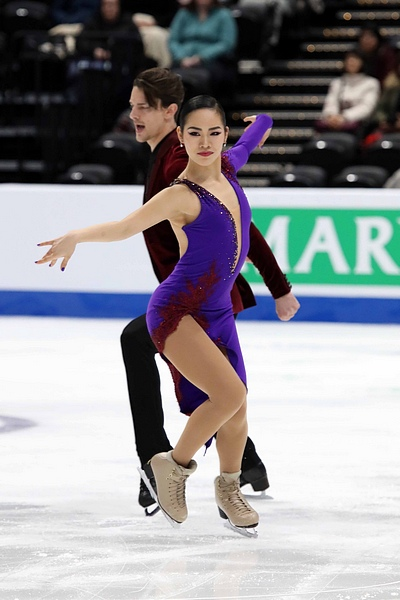
- Komatsubara/Koleto at the 2019 Four Continents

Personal information
- Native name: 小松原 美里
- Born: July 28, 1992 (age 34) Tokyo, Japan
- Height: 1.60 m (5 ft 3 in)

Figure skating career
- Country: Japan; Italy (2014–2016)
- Partner: Tim Koleto (2016–24); Andrea Fabbri (2014–2016); Kaoru Tsuji (2011–2013); Kokoro Mizutani (2009–2011)
- Coach: Marie-France Dubreuil; Patrice Lauzon; Romain Haguenauer; Rie Arikawa; Cathy Reed
- Skating club: Montreal International School of Skating
- Began skating: 2001
- Retired: 2024 (from competition)
- Highest WS: 28th (ice dance, 2021)
Event	Gold medal – first place	Silver medal – second place	Bronze medal – third place
Olympic Games	0	1	0
Japan Championships	5	2	1
Italian Championships	0	0	2
World Team Trophy	0	1	1
Medal list
representing Japan
Olympic Games
Silver medal – second place	2022 Beijing	Team
Japan Championships
Gold medal – first place	2018–19 Osaka	Ice dance
Gold medal – first place	2019–20 Tokyo	Ice dance
Gold medal – first place	2020–21 Nagano	Ice dance
Gold medal – first place	2023–24 Nagano	Ice dance
Gold medal – first place	2021–22 Saitama	Ice dance
Silver medal – second place	2017–18 Tokyo	Ice dance
Silver medal – second place	2022–23 Osaka	Ice dance
Bronze medal – third place	2016–17 Osaka	Ice dance
World Team Trophy
Silver medal – second place	2019 Fukuoka	Team
Bronze medal – third place	2021 Tokyo	Team
Medal list
representing Italy
Italian Championships
Bronze medal – third place	2015 Turin	Ice dance
Bronze medal – third place	2016 Turin	Ice dance

Misato Komatsubara (小松原 美里, Komatsubara Misato; born July 28, 1992) is a Japanese retired ice dancer. She represented her home country in partnership with her ex-husband Tim Koleto, with whom she is the 2020 NHK Trophy champion and a five-time Japanese national champion (2018-21, 2023). Together, they also earned a silver medal from the team event at the 2022 Winter Olympics. (Note: On 29 January 2024, the CAS disqualified Valieva for four years retroactive to 25 December 2021 for an anti-doping rule violation. On 30 January 2024, the ISU reallocated medals to upgrade the United States to gold and Japan to silver, while downgrading the ROC to bronze.)

She previously represented Italy with Andrea Fabbri, with whom she won five international medals, including silver at the 2015 CS Ice Challenge.

== Personal life ==
Komatsubara was born on July 28, 1992, in Tokyo. She speaks Japanese, English, and Italian. She is vegan.

Komatsubara and Tim Koleto began a relationship after partnering on-ice in 2016, and they married in January 2017 in Okayama, Japan. Koleto adopted Komatsubara's surname upon his becoming a Japanese citizen in 2020, because Japanese law requires married citizens to share the same surname. He explained that "to be Japanese but ask my wife to change to a foreign surname I thought was quite strange." Koleto and Komatsubara ended their marriage on amicable terms in 2024, but they remained ice dance partners until her retirement.

== Career ==
=== Early years ===
Komatsubara began learning to skate in 2001. She competed for Japan with Kokoro Mizutani in the 2009–10 and 2010–11 seasons. In 2010, the two received a pair of Junior Grand Prix assignments. They were coached by Nozomi Watanabe in Yokohama, Japan.

During the next two seasons, Komatsubara skated with Kaoru Tsuji. Their partnership ended in 2013. After a pause, she decided to continue skating and resumed training under Rie Arikawa in Okayama.

=== Partnership with Fabbri ===
==== 2014–15 season ====
Komatsubara teamed up with Italy's Andrea Fabbri. The two were coached by Barbara Fusar-Poli in Milan from December 2013. They represented Italy on the senior level. Their international debut came in October 2014 at the Ondrej Nepela Trophy, a Challenger Series (CS) event where they finished 6th. After winning bronze medals at the Santa Claus Cup and Italian Championships, they were sent to the 2015 European Championships in Stockholm, where they placed 23rd. The two ended their season with gold at the Bavarian Open.

==== 2015–16 season ====
In 2015–16, Komatsubara/Fabbri took bronze at the Lombardia Trophy and then appeared at two Challenger Series events, winning silver at the 2015 Ice Challenge. After obtaining another silver medal, at the 2015 Santa Claus Cup, they repeated as national bronze medalists and went on to compete at the 2016 European Championships in Bratislava, where they finished 21st. They were coached by Fusar-Poli and Stefano Caruso in Milan, Italy.

Komatsubara and Fabbri ended their partnership in April 2016.

=== Partnership with Koleto ===
==== 2016–17 season ====
Komatsubara teamed up with Timothy Koleto following a tryout in Milan in April 2016. They decided to train together in Milan under Barbara Fusar-Poli. They received the bronze medal at the 2016–17 Japan Championships in December 2016.

==== 2017–18 season ====
Making their international debut for Japan, Komatsubara/Koleto placed 8th at the CS Lombardia Trophy in September 2017. They finished tenth at their only Grand Prix assignment, the 2017 NHK Trophy. The two won the silver medal in December at the 2017–18 Japan Championships. In late January, they placed tenth at the 2018 Four Continents Championships. In early February, they placed fourth at the 2018 Toruń Cup.

==== 2018–19 season ====
In March 2018, Komatsubara/Koleto announced that they had moved to Montreal, Quebec, Canada, to train under Marie-France Dubreuil, Patrice Lauzon, and Romain Haguenauer. They won bronze at both of their ISU Challenger Series events, the 2018 CS Asian Open Trophy and 2018 CS US International Classic. They then competed at two Grand Prix assignments, placing eighth at the 2018 NHK Trophy and eighth at the 2018 Rostelecom Cup.

Following the Rostelecom Cup, the team moved to train in Japan (coached by Rie Arikawa) in order for Koleto to meet a residency requirement for a future citizenship application. They won their first ice dance title at the 2018-19 Japan Championships in December 2018. They placed ninth at the 2019 Four Continents Championships after placing ninth in both segments. Komatsubara/Koleto represented Japan at their first World Championships, held in Saitama, where they placed twenty-first in the rhythm dance, missing the free dance by one ordinal.

To conclude the season, they participated in the 2019 World Team Trophy as part of Team Japan, which won the silver medal, though Komatsubara/Koleto placed sixth of sixth competitors in each of their segments. Komatsubara served as the Japanese team captain.

==== 2019–20 season ====
Initially scheduled to begin the season at the 2019 CS Autumn Classic International, Komatsubara/Koleto withdrew early in the preseason as a result of Komatsubara having sustained multiple concussions that necessitated time away from training. They later made their season debut at a different Challenger, the 2019 CS Asian Open, where they finished ninth. On the Grand Prix, they were tenth out of ten teams at the 2019 Cup of China and then withdrew from the 2019 NHK Trophy.

Returning to competition at the 2019–20 Japan Championships, they won their second consecutive national title. Komatsubara/Koleto finished eleventh at the 2020 Four Continents Championships. They were also assigned to compete at the World Championships in Montreal, but these were cancelled as a result of the coronavirus pandemic.

==== 2020–21 season ====
With the pandemic continuing to affect international travel, the ISU opted to base the Grand Prix primarily on geographic location, and Komatsubara/Koleto were assigned to compete at the 2020 NHK Trophy in a field consisting of only three Japanese dance teams, including the newly debuted pairing of former national champion Kana Muramoto and former Olympic medalist singles skater Daisuke Takahashi. The event occurred a week after Koleto successfully obtained Japanese citizenship, making the team eligible to represent Japan at the Winter Olympics, and he said it was "great to share this moment with the Japanese audience." They placed first in the rhythm dance by over six points. Winning the free dance as well, they took the title, the first Japanese dance team to win the NHK Trophy in its history.

Competing at the 2020–21 Japan Championships, Komatsubara/Koleto placed first in the rhythm dance, four points ahead of Muramoto/Takahashi. They won the free dance by almost twenty points, with both the silver and bronze medalists making serious errors, and took their third consecutive national title. They were named as Japan's representatives to the 2021 World Championships in Stockholm. They placed nineteenth, making the free dance for the first time. Komatsubara/Koleto's result qualified a berth for a Japanese dance team at the 2022 Winter Olympics.

Komatsubara/Koleto finished the season at the 2021 World Team Trophy, where they placed fifth in both of their segments of the competition, and Team Japan won the bronze medal.

==== 2021–22 season ====
In preparing their programs for the Olympic season, Komatsubara and Koleto briefly contemplated a Japanese theme for their rhythm dance but opted against it because Koleto felt "it could be difficult for me as a Caucasian man to skate to a Japanese style. How can I respectfully portray my country that I care so much about in a way that doesn’t feel like a Halloween costume, in a way that doesn’t feel like a joke." Instead, they chose a free dance to John Williams' score for Memoirs of a Geisha, as Komatsubara felt "there were pieces of our story, pieces of our road, all inside of this music in this movie."

Komatsubara/Koleto made their season debut at the 2021 Skate America, where they placed sixth. At their second event on the Grand Prix, the 2021 NHK Trophy, they finished in seventh place, 7.30 points behind domestic rivals Muramoto/Takahashi. Koleto said afterwards, "there were a lot of things that didn’t go as we wanted them," but expressed satisfaction at having achieved new personal bests. He said their goal was to score over 180 points at the national championships.

The 2021–22 Japan Championships, the final national qualification event for the 2022 Winter Olympics, pitted Komatsubara/Koleto against Muramoto/Takahashi for the second time that season. They won the rhythm dance, and finished second in the free dance to win the title overall, and were subsequently named to the Japanese Olympic team.

Komatsubara/Koleto began the 2022 Winter Olympics as the Japanese entries in the rhythm dance segment of the Olympic team event. They placed seventh in the segment, securing four points for Team Japan. They finished fifth of the five dance teams in the free segment, taking six points for Japan. The Japanese team ultimately won the bronze medal, making the podium for the first time in the history of the team event. In the dance event, Komatsubara/Koleto finished twenty-second in the rhythm dance.

==== 2022–23 season ====
After placing seventh at the 2022 CS U.S. Classic, Komatsubara/Koleto were seventh as well at the 2022 Skate Canada International. They finished ninth at the 2022 NHK Trophy.

Komatsubara/Koleto won the silver medal at the 2022–23 Japan Championships, finishing behind Muramoto/Takahashi. Komatsubara said "We are disappointed about the result, but we had a lot of fun."

At the 2023 Four Continents Championships, Komatsubara/Koleto finished sixth in the rhythm dance and seventh overall, remaining ahead of their domestic rivals in both segments. They then finished fourth at the International Challenge Cup.

==== 2023–24 season ====
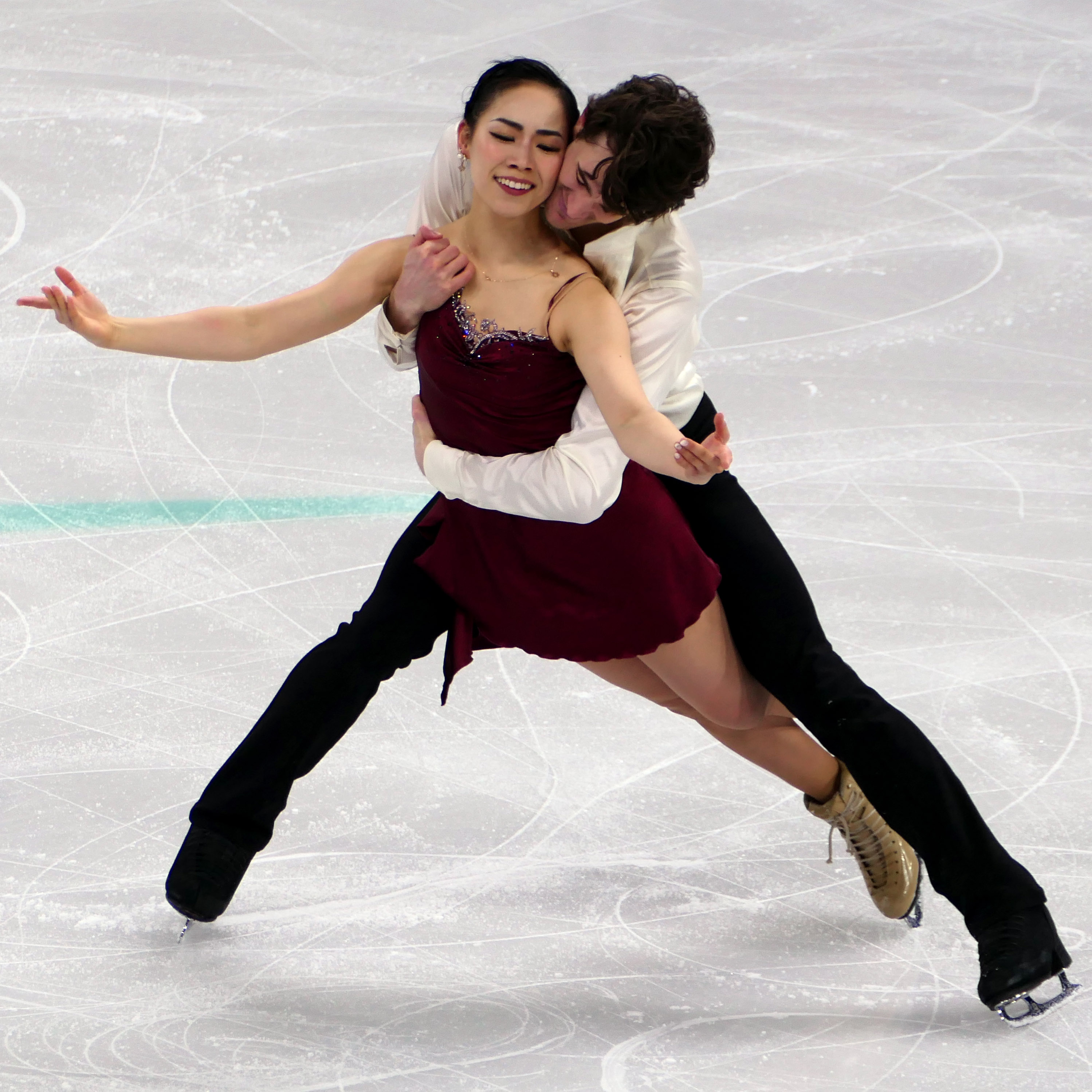
Komatsubara and Koleto during their free dance at the 2024 World Championships

Komatsubara/Koleto made their season debut at the 2023 NHK Trophy, placing ninth of nine teams in their lone international assignment of the fall. They next competed at the 2023–24 Japan Championships, which proved to be a tight contest between them and two other newer senior teams. They finished second in the rhythm dance behind Tanaka/Nishiyama, and second in the free dance behind Yoshida/Morita, but finished first overall, 1.96 points clear of Tanaka/Nishiyama. Remarking on the quality of the competition, Koleto said "I was emotional to see three Japanese ice dance teams fight for Japan."

With the close result at the national championships, the Japan Skating Federation opted to postpone assigning Japan's lone berth at the 2024 World Championships pending the results of all three teams at the 2024 Four Continents Championships. Traveling to Shanghai to compete, Komatsubara/Koleto finished eighth overall, outscoring their domestic rivals, and setting new personal bests. They finished sixth in the rhythm dance, achieving their goal of breaking the 70-point threshold in that segment.

Komatsubara/Koleto came twentieth in the rhythm dance at the World Championships, and were the final team to qualify for the free dance. They rose to eighteenth overall after that segment.

In April 2024, Misato Komatsubara announced that she had retired from competitive skating, citing injuries as the main reason, but wished continue skating in shows with Koleto, while Koleto was still considering his options.

During the 2024 Paris Olympics, a medal ceremony was held for Komatsubara/Koleto and their teammates from the 2022 Olympic Figure Skating Team Event, where they were awarded their Olympic silver medals. During the gala exhibition at the 2024 NHK Trophy, all members of the 2022 Olympic Team Event, including Komatsubara/Koleto, were invited to center stage, wearing their Olympic costumes and Olympic medals, in celebration of their achievement.

== Post-competitive career ==
In June 2026, it was announced that Komatsubara had begun working as a coach at the Sysmex Kobe Ice Campus in Kobe.

== Programs ==
=== With Koleto ===
Season	Rhythm dance	Free dance	Exhibition
2023–2024	Ghostbusters by Ray Parker Jr.; True by Spandau Ballet choreo. by Romain Haguenauer, Marie-France Dubreuil, Ginette Cournoyer, Samuel Chouinard, Eva Airapetian	Loving You (from Passion) by Stephen Sondheim performed by Barbra Streisand, Patrick Wilson; Love Grows (from Final Fantasy VIII) by Nobuo Uematsu choreo. by Romain Haguenauer	Sakura Nagashi by Hikaru Utada
2022–2023	Loca by Shakira ft. Dizzee Rascal; Hay Amores by Shakira; La La La (Brazil 2014) by Shakira ft. Carlinhos Brown choreo. by Romain Haguenauer, Marie-France Dubreuil, Ginette Cournoyer, Samuel Chouinard, Eva Airapetian	The Fifth Element: Il dolce suono (Lucia di Lammermoor) by Gaetano Donizetti; The Diva Dance by Éric Serra choreo. by Romain Haguenauer, Marie-France Dubreuil, Ginette Cournoyer, Samuel Chouinard, Eva Airapetian	Filter by BTS; (You Drive Me) Crazy; Oops!... I Did It Again by Britney Spears
2021–2022	Le Freak by Chic; What You Won't Do for Love by Bobby Caldwell; You Make Me Feel (Mighty Real) by Sylvester choreo. by Ginette Cournoyer, Samuel Chouinard	Sayuri's Theme; Going to School; The Chairman's Waltz; Sayuri's Theme and End Credits (from Memoirs of a Geisha) by John Williams choreo. by Ginette Cournoyer, Samuel Chouinard	
2020–2021	Blues: Dreamgirls; Swing: One Night Only; Disco: Jimmy Got Soul (from Dreamgirls) by Henry Krieger & Tom Eyen choreo. by Marie-France Dubreuil, Romain Haguenauer	Une histoire d'amour performed by Mireille Mathieu; The Waltz of Memories by Karl Hugo choreo. by Marie-France Dubreuil, Romain Haguenauer	Umarekuru Kodomotachi no Tame ni by Kazumasa Oda
2019–2020	Blues: Dreamgirls; Swing: One Night Only; Disco: Jimmy Got Soul (from Dreamgirls) by Henry Krieger & Tom Eyen choreo. by Marie-France Dubreuil, Romain Haguenauer	Cry of the Celts; Suil a Ruin; The Lord of the Dance (from Lord of the Dance) by Ronan Hardiman choreo. by Marie-France Dubreuil, Romain Haguenauer	
2018–2019	Tango: El Sol Sueno by Gidon Kremer; Tango: Sueno de Barrilete by Susana Rinaldi choreo. by Marie-France Dubreuil, Romain Haguenauer	Une histoire d'amour performed by Mireille Mathieu choreo. by Marie-France Dubreuil, Romain Haguenauer	Your Name by RADWIMPS
	Short dance	Free dance	Exhibition
2017–2018	Salsa, Rhumba: Ahora Quien by Marc Anthony; Samba: Samba do Brasil (Radio Remix) by Bellini choreo. by Barbara Fusar-Poli	Where Is It Written? (from Yentl) by Barbra Streisand, Michel Legrand; End Credits (from Sabrina) by John Williams; A Piece of Sky (from Yentl) by Barbra Streisand, Michel Legrand choreo. by Barbara Fusar-Poli	
2016–2017	Mercy on Me; Candyman choreo. by Christopher Dean	Bohemian Rhapsody by Freddie Mercury choreo. by Christopher Dean	

=== With Fabbri ===
Season	Short dance	Free dance
2015–2016	La traviata by Giuseppe Verdi; Waltz: Libiamo ne' lieti calici; Polka: Dell'invito trascorsa è già l'ora	Dolencias; Sikuriadas by Inti-Illimani
2014–2015	Dancers of the Night by Guido Luciani; Paso Nr. 6 performed by André Rieu	Unchain My Heart by Joe Cocker; It's a Man's Man's Man's World by James Brown, Luciano Pavarotti; Walking By Myself by Gary Moore

=== With Mizutani ===
Season	Short dance	Free dance
2010–2011	Waltz: Song of the Spirits	Corpse Bride by Danny Elfman; Remains Of The Day; Main Title; Remains Of The Day

== Competitive highlights ==
GP: Grand Prix; CS: Challenger Series; JGP: Junior Grand Prix

=== With Koleto for Japan ===
International
Event	16–17	17–18	18–19	19–20	20–21	21–22	22–23	23–24
Olympics						22nd		
Worlds			21st	C	19th			18th
Four Continents		10th	9th	11th			7th	8th
GP Cup of China				10th				
GP NHK Trophy		10th	8th	WD	1st	7th	9th	9th
GP Rostelecom			8th					
GP Skate America						6th		
GP Skate Canada							7th	
CS Asian Open			3rd	9th		WD		
CS Autumn Classic				WD				
CS Lombardia		8th						
CS U.S. Classic			3rd				7th	
CS Warsaw Cup						WD		
Challenge Cup							4th	
Toruń Cup		4th						
National
Japan Champ.	3rd	2nd	1st	1st	1st	1st	2nd	1st
Japan Western Sect.	2nd	1st			1st			3rd
Team events
Olympics						2nd T		
World Team Trophy			2nd T 6th P		3rd T 5th P			
TBD = Assigned; WD = Withdrew; C = Event cancelled T = Team result; P = Personal result. Medals awarded for team result only.

=== With Fabbri for Italy ===
International
Event	14–15	15–16
European Champ.	23rd	21st
CS Denkova-Staviski Cup		4th
CS Ice Challenge	5th	2nd
CS Nepela Trophy	6th	
Bavarian Open	1st	
Lombardia Trophy		3rd
Santa Claus Cup	3rd	2nd
National
Italian Champ.	3rd	3rd

=== With Tsuji for Japan ===
National
Event	11–12	12–13
Japan Championships		4th
Japan Junior Champ.	1st	
Japan Western Sect.	1st J	2nd

=== With Mizutani for Japan ===
International
Event	09–10	10–11
World Junior Champ.		14th PR
JGP Germany		15th
JGP Japan		11th
Bavarian Open		5th J
National
Japan Junior Champ.	1st	1st
J = Junior level; PR = Preliminary round

=== Women's singles ===
National
Event	07–08
Japan Junior Champ.	23rd

== Detailed results ==
ISU personal best scores in the +5/-5 GOE System
Segment	Type	Score	Event
Total	TSS	182.70	2024 Four Continents Championships
Short program	TSS	71.29	2024 Four Continents Championships
Short program	TES	40.26	2024 Four Continents Championships
Short program	PCS	31.03	2024 Four Continents Championships
Free skating	TSS	111.41	2024 Four Continents Championships
Free skating	TES	63.05	2024 Four Continents Championships
Free skating	PCS	48.36	2024 Four Continents Championships

=== Senior results ===
==== With Koleto for Japan ====
2023–2024 season
Date	Event	RD	FD	Total
March 18–24, 2024	2024 World Championships	20; 66.92	17; 106.98	18; 173.90
Jan. 30 – Feb. 4, 2024	2024 Four Continents Championships	6; 71.29	8; 111.41	8; 182.70
December 20–24, 2023	2023–24 Japan Championships	2; 70.89	2; 107.50	1; 178.39
November 24–26, 2023	2023 NHK Trophy	9; 64.12	8; 103.49	9; 167.61
October 25-29, 2023	2023 Japan Western Sectional	1; 70.94	3; 99.48	3; 170.62
2022–23 season
Date	Event	RD	FD	Total
February 23–26, 2023	2023 Challenge Cup	4; 68.78	5; 97.92	4; 166.70
February 7–12, 2023	2023 Four Continents Championships	6; 66.72	8; 98.99	7; 165.71
December 21–25, 2022	2022–23 Japan Championships	2; 69.96	2; 105.14	2; 175.10
November 17–20, 2022	2022 NHK Trophy	8; 66.65	9; 97.65	9; 164.30
October 28-30, 2022	2022 Skate Canada	7; 68.88	7; 97.18	7; 166.06
September 13–16, 2022	2022 U.S.Classic	7; 60.38	7; 95.56	7; 155.94
2021–22 season
Date	Event	RD	FD	Total
February 12–14, 2022	2022 Winter Olympics	22; 65.41	—	22; 65.41
February 4–7, 2022	2022 Winter Olympics — Team event	7; 66.54	5; 98.66	2T
December 22–26, 2021	2021–22 Japan Championships	1; 68.16	2; 110.01	1; 178.17
November 12–14, 2021	2021 NHK Trophy	7; 68.13	7; 104.07	7; 172.20
October 22–24, 2021	2021 Skate America	7; 63.56	6; 100.76	6; 164.32
2020–21 season
Date	Event	RD	FD	Total
April 15–18, 2021	2021 World Team Trophy	5; 66.42	5; 100.82	3T/5P; 167.24
March 22–28, 2021	2021 World Championships	18; 68.02	20; 99.79	19; 167.81
December 24–27, 2020	2020–21 Japan Championships	1; 71.74	1; 103.49	1; 175.23
November 27–29, 2020	2020 NHK Trophy	1; 70.76	1; 108.29	1; 179.05
2019–20 season
Date	Event	RD	FD	Total
February 4–9, 2020	2020 Four Continents Championships	11; 61.45	10; 95.75	11; 157.20
December 18–22, 2019	2019–20 Japan Championships	1; 63.79	1; 99.52	1; 163.31
November 8–10, 2019	2019 Cup of China	10; 56.60	10; 88.75	10; 145.35
October 30 - November 3, 2019	2019 CS Asian Open Trophy	9; 55.39	9; 86.70	9; 142.09
2018–19 season
Date	Event	RD	FD	Total
April 11–14, 2019	2019 World Team Trophy	6; 60.93	6; 99.31	2T/6P; 160.24
March 18–24, 2019	2019 World Championships	21; 60.98	-	21; 60.98
February 7-10, 2019	2019 Four Continents Championships	9; 54.94	9; 94.20	9; 149.14
December 20–24, 2018	2018–19 Japan Championships	1; 52.21	1; 100.39	1; 152.60
November 16–18, 2018	2018 Rostelecom Cup	8; 52.99	8; 90.29	8; 143.28
November 9–11, 2018	2018 NHK Trophy	9; 59.40	8; 94.87	8; 154.27
September 12–16, 2018	2018 CS US International Classic	4; 53.42	3; 89.51	3; 142.93
August 1–5, 2018	2018 CS Asian Open Trophy	3; 61.28	2; 93.47	3; 154.75
2017–18 season
Date	Event	SD	FD	Total
Jan. 30–Feb. 4, 2018	2018 Toruń Cup	4; 58.90	4; 88.96	4; 147.86
January 22–28, 2018	2018 Four Continents Championships	10; 52.45	9; 85.73	10; 138.18
December 20–24, 2017	2017–18 Japan Championships	2; 56.65	2; 92.82	2; 149.47
November 10–12, 2017	2017 NHK Trophy	10; 53.83	10; 78.58	10; 132.41
September 14–17, 2017	2017 CS Lombardia Trophy	9; 49.80	6; 78.48	8; 128.28
2016–17 season
Date	Event	SD	FD	Total
December 22–25, 2016	2016–17 Japan Championships	3; 51.47	3; 73.85	3; 125.12

==== With Fabbri for Italy ====
2015–16 season
Date	Event	SD	FD	Total
January 25–31, 2016	2016 European Championships	21; 49.56	DNQ	21; 49.56
December 16–19, 2015	2016 Italian Championships	3; 56.50	3; 87.84	3; 144.34
Nov. 28–Dec. 4, 2015	2015 Santa Claus Cup	3; 54.32	2; 88.23	2; 142.55
October 20–25, 2015	2015 CS Denkova-Staviski Cup	5; 48.14	4; 82.74	4; 245.95
October 27–31, 2015	2015 CS Ice Challenge	2; 51.76	3; 74.90	2; 126.66
September 17–20, 2015	2015 Lombardia Trophy	3; 47.05	3; 76.83	3; 123.88
2014–15 season
Date	Event	SD	FD	Total
February 11–15, 2015	2015 Bavarian Open	1	1	1; 142.38
Jan. 26–February 1, 2015	2015 European Championships	23; 42.83	DNQ	23; 42.83
December 20–21, 2014	2015 Italian Championships	3; 59.75	4; 80.68	3; 140.43
December 1–7, 2014	2014 Santa Claus Cup	3; 51.60	3; 77.77	3; 129.37
November 11–16, 2014	2014 CS Ice Challenge	4; 50.16	6; 76.98	5; 127.14
October 1–5, 2014	2014 CS Ondrej Nepela Trophy	6; 42.98	5; 65.50	6; 108.48

==== With Tsuji for Japan ====
2012–13 season
Date	Event	SD	FD	Total
December 20–24, 2012	2012 Japanese Championships	4; 34.27	3; 57.90	4; 92.17

=== Junior results ===
==== With Tsuji for Japan ====
2011–12 season
Date	Event	SD	FD	Total
November 25–27, 2011	2011 Japanese Junior Championships	1; 33.04	1; 40.86	1; 73.92

==== With Mizutani for Japan ====
2010–11 season
Date	Event	PR	SD	FD	Total
Feb. 28–March. 6, 2011	2011 World Junior Championships	14; 48.87	DNQ	DNQ	28
February 9–13, 2011	2011 Bavarian Open	–	8; 36.16	5; 59.31	5; 95.47
November 26–28, 2010	2010 Japanese Junior Championships	–	1; 42.02	1; 61.85	1; 103.87
November 10–12, 2017	2010 SBC Cup	–	11; 35.86	11; 53.18	11; 89.04
September 14–17, 2017	2010 Pokal der Blauen Schwerter	–	11; 38.16	16; 51.56	15; 89.72
2009–10 season
Date	Event	CD	OD	FD	Total
November 21–23, 2009	2009 Japanese Junior Championships	1; 23.49	1; 37.50	1; 61.61	1; 122.60
