= Miu Suzaki =

Japanese pair skater (born 1999)

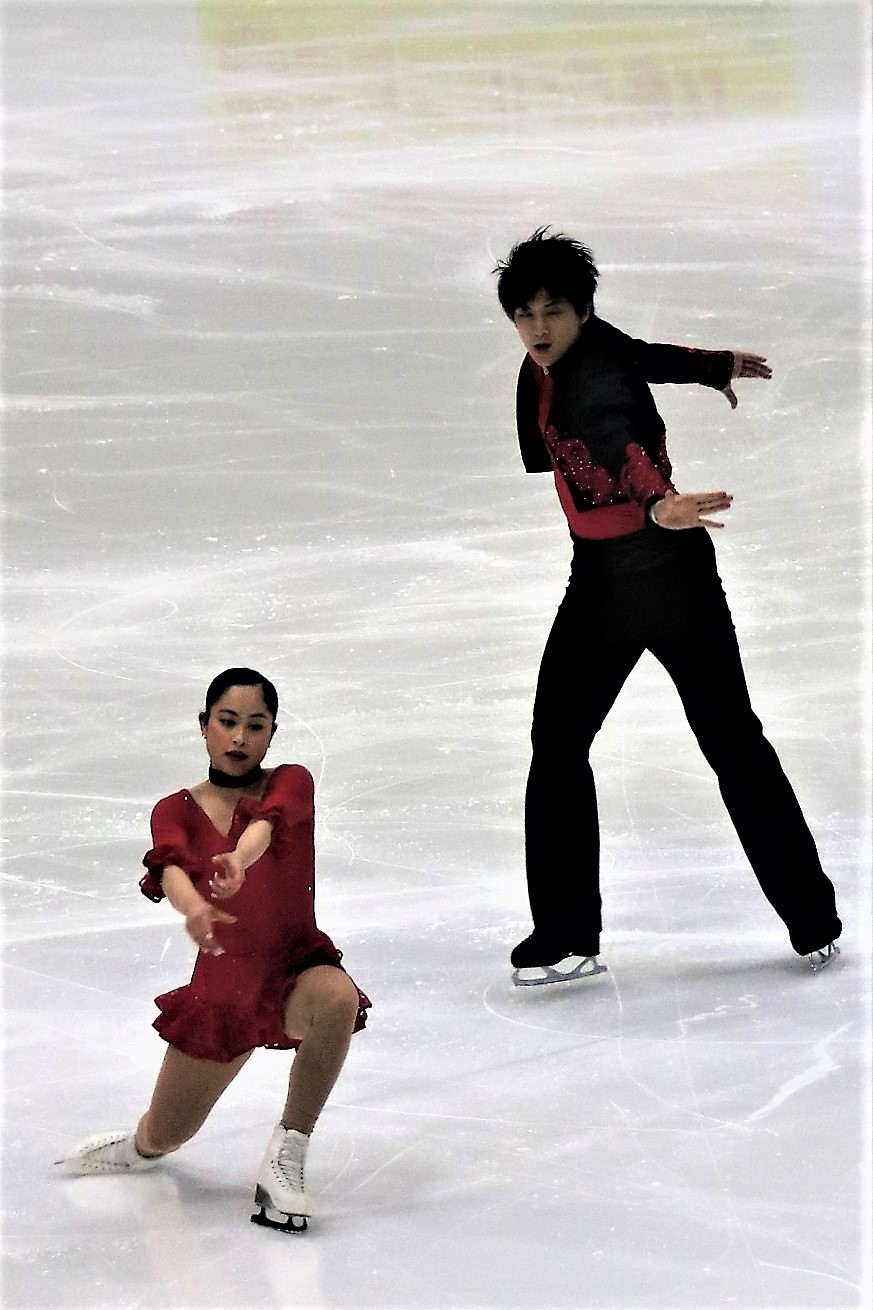

Personal information
- Born: 15 December 1999 (age 26) Nagoya, Japan
- Height: 153 cm (5 ft 0 in)

Figure skating career
- Country: Japan
- Discipline: Pair skating
- Coach: Jason Dungjen, Yuka Sato
- Skating club: Kinoshita Group Tokyo
- Began skating: 2004

Medal record
Japan Championships
Gold medal – first place	2017–18 Tokyo	Pairs
Gold medal – first place	2018–19 Osaka	Pairs
Silver medal – second place	2016–17 Osaka	Pairs
Bronze medal – third place	2015–16 Sapporo	Pairs

Miu Suzaki (須崎 海羽, Suzaki Miu; born December 15, 1999) is a Japanese pair skater. With her former skating partner, Ryuichi Kihara, she is a two-time Asian Open Trophy medalist and the 2017 Japan national Champion. They have competed at the Four Continents Championships and on the Grand Prix series.

== Career ==
=== Early years ===
Suzaki began learning to skate in 2004. She placed 13th in ladies' singles at the 2013–14 Japan Junior Championships.

=== 2015–2016 season ===
Suzaki decided to compete in pairs in the 2015–2016 season. Her partnership with Ryuichi Kihara was announced in June 2015. In December, they received the bronze medal at the Japan Championships. They did not appear internationally in their first season together.

=== 2016–2017 season ===
After winning their first international medal (bronze) at the Asian Open Trophy in early August 2016 in Manila, Suzaki/Kihara took silver at the Japan Championships in December. Ranked twelfth in the short program and fourteenth in the free skate, they finished thirteenth overall at the 2017 Four Continents Championships, held in February in Gangneung, South Korea.

=== 2017–2018 season ===
Suzaki/Kihara began their season with silver at the Asian Open Trophy in August 2017. Making their Grand Prix debut, they finished eighth at the 2017 NHK Trophy in November. They won their first national title at the 2017–18 Japan Championships, and were assigned to Japan's lone pairs spot at the 2018 Winter Olympics in PyeongChang. In February, they competed at the Olympics in both the team event and the individual event. They placed 21st in the latter and missed the free skate. They concluded their season at the 2018 World Championships, where they placed 24th, again missing the free skate.

=== 2018–2019 season ===
In October 2018, Suzaki/Kihara placed tenth at the 2018 CS Finlandia Trophy. They placed eighth at the 2018 Grand Prix Helsinki, their first Grand Prix event of the season. They also placed eighth at the 2018 NHK Trophy, their second assignment. They won a second national title at the 2018–19 Japan Championships. Due to a concussion sustained by Kihara in training, the pair withdrew from the 2019 Four Continents Championships and the home 2019 World Championships in Saitama. They announced the end of their partnership in early April 2019.

== Programs ==
(with Kihara)

Season	Short program	Free skating	Exhibition
2018–2019	Malagueña by Ernesto Lecuona choreo. by Pasquale Camerlengo	Turn to Stone by Ingrid Michaelson choreo. by Yuka Sato, Jeremy Abbott	Yuri on Ice by Taro Umebayashi
2017–2018	Yuri on Ice by Taro Umebayashi choreo. by Yuka Sato	Romeo and Juliet by Nino Rota choreo. by Pasquale Camerlengo	Yuri on Ice by Taro Umebayashi
2016–2017	Out of the Garage by Daniel Pemberton; Mission: Impossible choreo. by Yuka Sato	Star Wars by John Williams choreo. by Yuka Sato; Duel of the Fates; Across the Stars	Mission: Impossible choreo. by Yuka Sato
2015–2016	Let it go choreo. by Yuka Sato	Star Wars by John Williams choreo. by Yuka Sato; Duel of the Fates; Across the Stars	Move Together

== Competitive highlights ==
GP: Grand Prix; CS: Challenger Series

=== Pairs with Kihara ===
International
Event	15–16	16–17	17–18	18–19
Olympics			21st	
Worlds			24th	WD
Four Continents		13th	8th	WD
GP Finland				8th
GP NHK Trophy			8th	8th
CS Finlandia Trophy				10th
Asian Open Trophy		3rd	2nd	
National
Japan Champ.	3rd	2nd	1st	1st
Team events
Olympics			5th T	

=== Ladies' singles ===
National
Event	10–11	11–12	12–13	13–14
Japan Junior Champ.				13th
Japan Novice Champ.	22nd B	28th A	13th A	
A = Novice A category, B = Novice B category
