= Narumi Takahashi =

Japanese pair skater

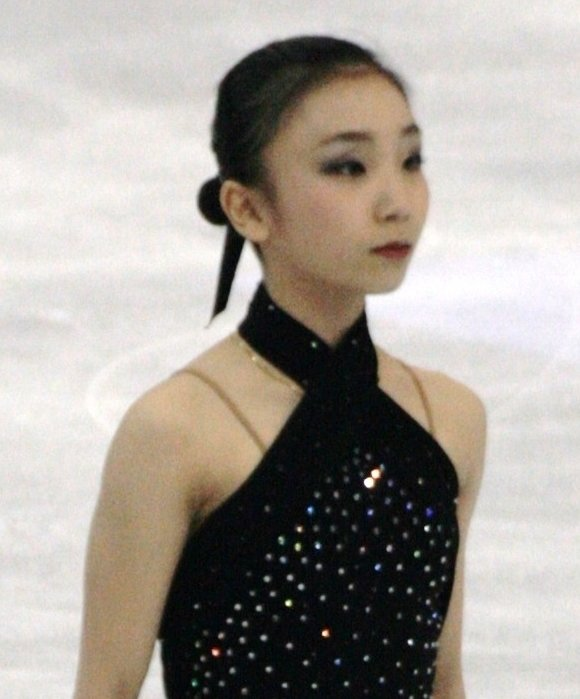
- Takahashi at the 2012 World Championships

Personal information
- Born: January 15, 1992 (age 34) Chiba, Japan
- Height: 146 cm (4 ft 9 in)

Figure skating career
- Country: Japan
- Skating club: Kinoshita Tokyo
- Began skating: 1997
- Retired: March 30, 2018

Medal record
Event	Gold medal – first place	Silver medal – second place	Bronze medal – third place
World Championships	0	0	1
Japanese Championships	6	1	0
World Team Trophy	1	0	1
World Junior Championships	0	1	1
Junior Grand Prix Final	1	1	0
Medal list
World Championships
Bronze medal – third place	2012 Nice	Pairs
Japanese Championships
Gold medal – first place	2008–09 Nagano	Pairs
Gold medal – first place	2009–10 Osaka	Pairs
Gold medal – first place	2010–11 Nagano	Pairs
Gold medal – first place	2011–12 Osaka	Pairs
Gold medal – first place	2013–14 Saitama	Pairs
Gold medal – first place	2014–15 Nagano	Pairs
Silver medal – second place	2017–18 Tokyo	Pairs
World Team Trophy
Gold medal – first place	2012 Tokyo	Team
Bronze medal – third place	2009 Tokyo	Team
World Junior Championships
Silver medal – second place	2010 The Hague	Pairs
Bronze medal – third place	2011 Gangneung	Pairs
Junior Grand Prix Final
Gold medal – first place	2010–11 Beijing	Pairs
Silver medal – second place	2009–10 Tokyo	Pairs

Narumi Takahashi

Japanese name
- Kanji: 高橋 成美
- Kana: たかはし なるみ
Transcriptions
- Romanization: Takahashi Narumi

Narumi Takahashi (高橋 成美, Takahashi Narumi; born January 15, 1992) is a Japanese retired pair skater and six-time Japanese national champion (2009-2012, 2014, 2015). With former partner Mervin Tran, she was the 2012 World bronze medalist, the 2010 Junior World silver medalist, and the 2010–11 Junior Grand Prix Final champion. They were the first pair to win a World medal for Japan. She has also skated with Ryo Shibata, Ryuichi Kihara and Alexandr Zaboev.

== Personal life ==
Takahashi was born in Chiba Prefecture, Japan. She has a sister that is two years older than her.

Her father's job took the family to China when she was nine. She lived in China for five years and attended international school while there. Takahashi returned to Japan during her junior high school years and attended Makuhari High School. She then moved to Montreal, Quebec, Canada with her mother so that she could train with then pair skating partner, Mervin Tran, and attended high school while there.

Upon returning to Japan as an adult, Takahashi went on to major in Faculty of Policy Management at Keio University and graduated in 2021.

Takahashi is able to speak seven different languages, including Japanese, Mandarin, English, Spanish, Russian, French, and Korean. In addition to skating, Takahashi also played soccer for six years on a city team.

In October 2021, Takahashi came out as queer during a talk event held by Pride House Tokyo. She shared that she had come to terms with her sexuality during her high school years when she was living in Montreal at the time and that she was "blessed" to be living in a supportive, accepting environment at the time. She also credited Canadian ice dancer, Kaitlyn Weaver, who had come out as queer the previous year, for empowering her to come out.

Takahashi opened up about her struggles with disordered eating that had started at the age of nine while she was living in China, saying that her pair skating coaches would constantly monitor her weight to ensure that she remained "light enough" to remain a pair skater. She added that several coaches would continue this type of behavior throughout her competitive career to the point of Takahashi completely normalizing it. Due to Takahashi's exceedingly low body fat percentage, she only began menstruating after retiring from compeitive figure skating in 2018 at the age of twenty-six.

== Career ==
=== Early career ===
After being diagnosed with pediatric asthma at the age of three, the doctor encouraged Takahashi's mother to have Takahashi engage in more physical activity. At age five, Takahashi began learning to skate, following in the footsteps of her elder sister. She won the Japanese bronze medal in novice B ladies' singles in 2002. She was further inspired to continue skating after watching figure skating at the 1998 Winter Olympics in Nagano, Japan on television.

With her father's job requiring him to relocate to the United States or China, Takahashi expressed the most interest in moving to China due to being inspired by Shen Xue / Zhao Hongbo's skating at the time. Moving to Beijing at the age of nine, she continued skating in singles until she was about 12–13 and then switched to pair skating. Takahashi skated with Chinese partner Gao Yu for one season; they placed 6th at the 2004 Chinese Championships on the senior level. She soon decided to leave China and skate for Japan after the Chinese Skating Association told her that they wanted her to obtain Chinese citizenship, which would have required her giving up her Japanese citizenship due to China's law of not recognizing dual citizenship. Upon returning, Takahashi asked the Japan Skating Federation for help in finding a pair skating partner; she eventually found a partner in Japan but the partnership was unsuccessful due to insufficient height difference.

=== Partnership with Tran ===
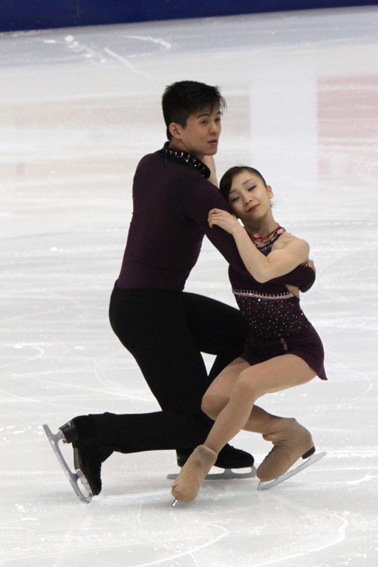
Takahashi/Tran in 2011

Takahashi moved to Montreal, Quebec after two years of corresponding with Richard Gauthier, whom she met at a competition in China. Gauthier began looking for a partner for her in Canada. Bruno Marcotte recommended Mervin Tran, who until that point had been a single skater. Tran agreed to come to Montreal for a tryout and the pair began training together in July 2007. During their career together, they trained in St. Leonard and received funding from the Japanese skating association.

Takahashi/Tran made their international debut on the 2007–2008 ISU Junior Grand Prix, where they placed 12th and 6th at their events. They won the Japan Junior Championships and earned a trip to 2008 Junior Worlds, where they placed 15th.

In the 2008–2009 season, Takahashi/Tran placed 4th at their first Junior Grand Prix event. They won the bronze medal at their second event, qualifying them for the 2008-2009 ISU Junior Grand Prix Final, where they placed 7th. They won the senior title at the 2008–2009 Japanese Championships. At the 2009 Junior Worlds, they placed 7th.

During the 2009–2010 season, Takahashi/Tran competed on the Junior Grand Prix circuit. They won the bronze medal at their first event and gold at their second event, which qualified them for the 2009–2010 Junior Grand Prix Final. They also debuted on the senior Grand Prix series with an 8th-place finish at NHK Trophy. They won silver at the JGP Final and at the Junior World Championships. They became the second pair representing Japan to medal at an ISU Championships (Yuko Kavaguti / Alexander Markuntsov were the first pair when they won silver in 2001).

During the 2010–2011 season, Takahashi/Tran won silver medals at their JGP events and qualified for the Junior Grand Prix Final. They won gold at the event, becoming the first pair representing Japan to win the title. They also won their first medals on the senior Grand Prix series, a bronze at 2010 NHK Trophy, and then silver at 2010 Cup of Russia. As a result, they were first alternates to the senior Grand Prix Final. They won the bronze medal at the 2011 Junior Worlds. They also made their senior World Championships debut, finishing 9th.

During the 2011–2012 season, Takahashi/Tran's first Grand Prix assignment was 2011 Skate Canada International, where they finished fourth. They won the silver medal at their second event, 2011 NHK Trophy. In November 2011, Tran said he was considering pursuing Japanese citizenship in order to allow the couple to compete at the Olympics but said it was a difficult decision because it would mean giving up his Canadian citizenship. They became the first Japanese pair to qualify for the senior Grand Prix Final.

At the 2012 World Championships, Takahashi/Tran placed third in both programs and won the bronze medal. They became the first pair to medal for Japan at a senior World Championships. They placed third at the 2012 World Team Trophy. In April 2012, Tran said he would continue to consider an application for Japanese citizenship and the president of the Japanese Olympic Committee said he was "willing to make a special request (on behalf of Tran) to the government if necessary." In May 2012, a government official said it would be difficult to naturalize Tran because he had never resided in Japan.

In April 2012, Takahashi dislocated her left shoulder while practicing a lift. After five or six recurrences, she decided to undergo surgery on October 30. As a result, the pair withdrew from their 2012–2013 Grand Prix events, the 2012 Cup of China and 2012 NHK Trophy. They said they would miss about four to six months. On December 18, 2012, the Japanese Skating Federation announced that the pair had ended their partnership.

=== Partnership with Kihara ===
The JSF said they hoped to find a new partner, with preference to skaters holding Japanese citizenship, by February 2013. On January 30, 2013, the JSF confirmed that Takahashi had teamed up with Ryuichi Kihara, until then a singles skater, and would be coached by Yuka Sato and Jason Dungjen. They trained in Bloomfield Hills, Michigan. They represented Japan together at the 2014 Olympics and placed 19th. The pair split in March 2015.

=== Partnership with Zaboev ===
On July 6, 2015, it was announced that Takahashi had teamed up with Russian pair skater Alexandr Zaboev and that Takahashi would continue to skate for Japan with him. The pair ultimately never competed together.

=== Partnership with Shibata ===
On May 18, 2016, it was announced that Takahashi had teamed up with retired single skater Ryo Shibata and that they would train in Geneva, Illinois under Stefania Berton and Rockne Brubaker.

As a team, Takahashi/Shibata won the bronze medal at the 2017 Asian Open Trophy and the silver medal at the 2017–18 Japan Championships.

In March 2018, Takahashi announced her retirement from competitive figure skating due to the impact of several injuries she suffered throughout her career, including recurrent dislocation of her left shoulder joint and a right knee injury that required surgery.

== Post-competitive career ==
Following her competitive career, Takahashi has helped coach Japanese pair teams, including Miyu Yunoki / Shoya Ichihashi and Haruna Murakami / Sumitada Moriguchi. She has also done figure skating commentary for Japanese television.

In spring 2019, Takahashi joined Showa University's women's hockey team, the Blue Winds, and played for a season.

In June 2021, it was announced that Takahashi had been elected as an executive board member of the Japanese Olympic Committee (JOC), becoming the youngest electee of the committee in history at the age of twenty-nine.

Takahashi also appeared in a supporting role in the 2022 Japanese film, Gekkako.

== Programs ==
=== With Shibata ===
Season	Short program	Free skating
2017–2018	A Moment to Remember by Kim Tae-won choreo. by Marina Zueva, Massimo Scali	Cinema Paradiso by Ennio Morricone choreo. by Marina Zueva, Massimo Scali
2016–2017	Méditation de Thaïs by Jules Massenet choreo. by Nikolai Morozov, Jamie Whyte	Turandot by Giacomo Puccini choreo. by Nikolai Morozov, Jamie Whyte

=== With Kihara ===
Season	Short program	Free skating	Exhibition
2014–2015	Bossa Nova Baby by Elvis Presley	That's Entertainment; Love is Here to Stay; I'll Build a Stairway to Paradise	Fireflies by Owl City
2013–2014	Samson and Delilah by Camille Saint-Saëns	Les Misérables by Claude-Michel Schönberg	Fireflies by Owl City

=== With Tran ===
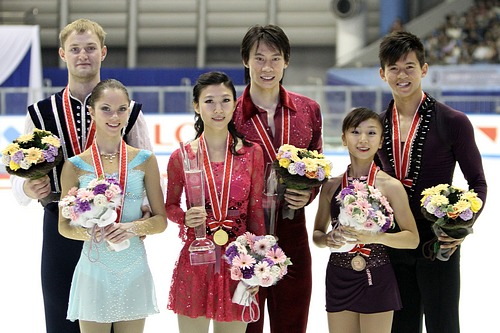
Takahashi / Tran won their first senior Grand Prix medal at 2010 NHK Trophy

Season	Short program	Free skating	Exhibition
2012–2013	Ain't No Sunshine by Bill Withers	Gigi (1958 film): Main Title; You Never Told Me; Gigi's Big Moment; Gaston's Decision	Runaway Baby by Bruno Mars
2011–2012	Imagine by John Lennon choreo. by Julie Marcotte	Concerto de Québec by André Mathieu	I Will Survive by Gloria Gaynor; A Little Less Conversation by Elvis Presley
2010–2011	Feeling Good by Michael Bublé	El Día Que Me Quieras by Raúl Di Blasio	I Will Survive by Gloria Gaynor
2009–2010	Farrucas by Pepe Romero; Chano Lobato; Maria Madgalena; Paco Romero (Flamenco)	Madame Butterfly by Giacomo Puccini; Butterfly Lovers Violin Concerto both performed by Vanessa-Mae	Black Betty performed by Ram Jam
2008–2009	Din Daa Daa (MI remix) by George Kranz; Seventeen Years by Ratatat	Madame Butterfly by Giacomo Puccini; Butterfly Lovers Violin Concerto both performed by Vanessa-Mae	Shout by The Isley Brothers
2007–2008	Shout and Feel It by James Horner	Samurai (from Le Rêve); Banquine (from Journey of Man) by Benoît Jutras	

== Competitive highlights ==
GP: Grand Prix; CS: Challenger Series; JGP: Junior Grand Prix

=== With Shibata ===
International
Event	16–17	17–18
Asian Games	6th	
Asian Trophy		3rd
National
Japan Championships	4th	2nd

=== With Kihara ===
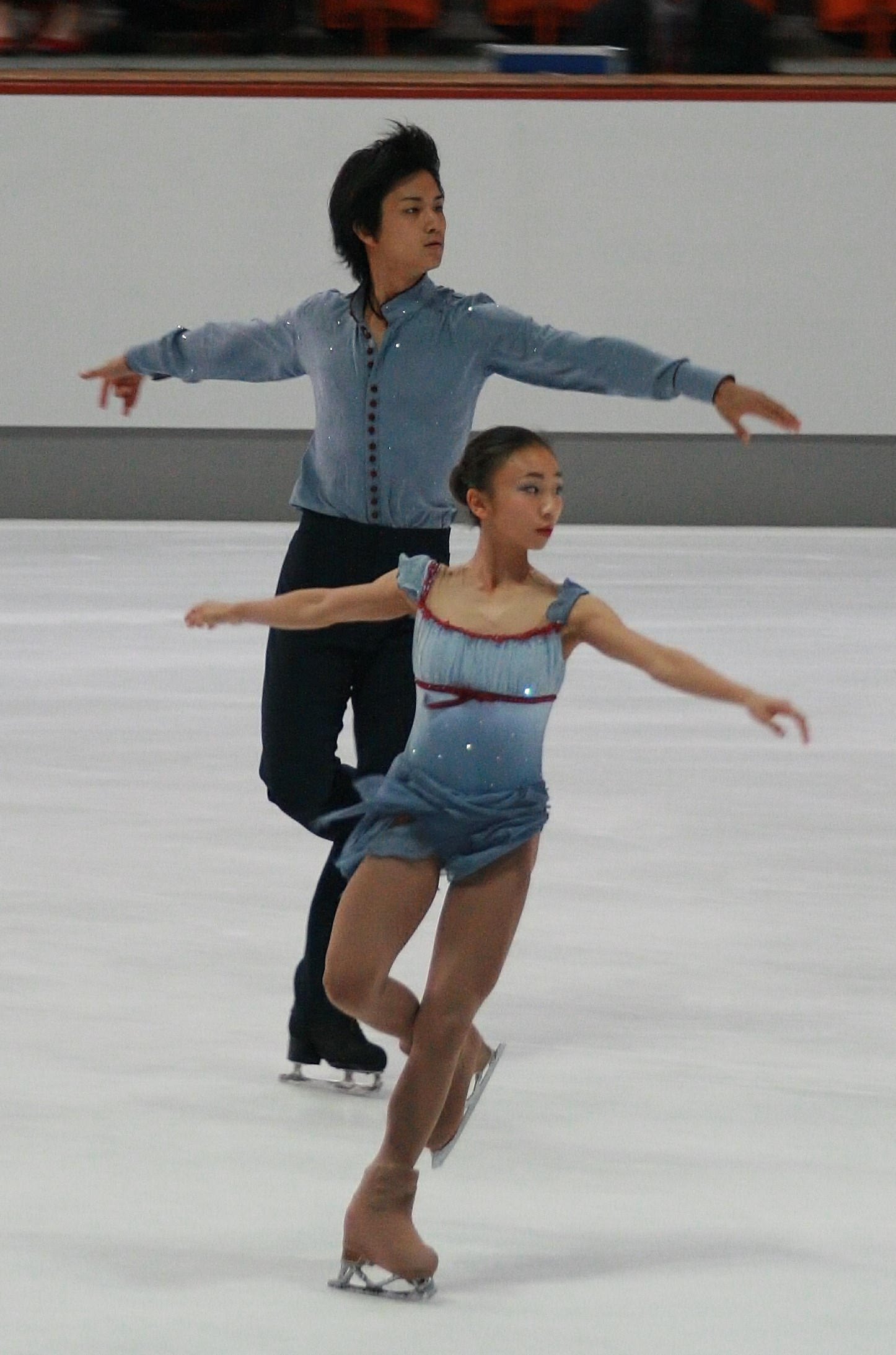
Takahashi/Kihara in 2013

International
Event	13–14	14–15
Winter Olympics	18th	
World Championships	17th	19th
Four Continents Champ.		10th
GP Rostelecom Cup		7th
GP NHK Trophy		7th
CS Nebelhorn Trophy		7th
Lombardia Trophy	7th	
Nebelhorn Trophy	11th	
National
Japan Championships	1st	1st
Team events
Winter Olympics	5th T	
T = Team result

=== With Tran ===
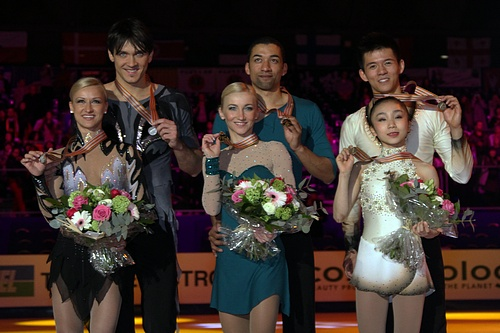
Takahashi/Tran with their fellow medalists at the 2012 World Championships

International
Event	07–08	08–09	09–10	10–11	11–12	12–13
Worlds				9th	3rd	
Four Continents			5th	7th	5th	
Grand Prix Final					6th	
GP Cup of China						WD
GP NHK Trophy			8th	3rd	2nd	WD
GP Rostel. Cup				2nd		
GP Skate Canada					4th	
International: Junior
Junior Worlds	15th	7th	2nd	3rd		
JGP Final		7th	2nd	1st		
JGP Estonia	12th					
JGP Germany	6th			2nd		
JGP Mexico		4th				
JGP Poland			1st			
JGP U.K.		3rd		2nd		
JGP USA			3rd			
National
Japan Champ.		1st	1st	1st	1st	
Japan Junior	1st					
Team events
World Team; Trophy		3rd T 6th P			1st T 3rd P	
WD: Withdrew; T = Team result; P = Personal result; Medals awarded for team result only.

=== With Yamada ===
National
Event	2006–07
Japan Junior Championships	1st

=== With Gao ===
National
Event	2003–04
Chinese Championships	6th

=== Ladies' singles ===
National
Event	2002–03
Japan Novice Championships	3rd B
Levels: B = Novice B
