= Ryo Shibata =

Japanese figure skater

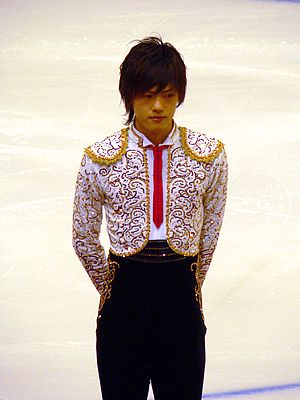
- Ryo Shibata in 2005

Personal information
- Full name: Ryo Shibata
- Born: February 24, 1987 (age 39) Kushiro, Hokkaido, Japan
- Height: 1.69 m (5 ft 7 in)

Figure skating career
- Country: Japan
- Skating club: Meiji University Club
- Began skating: 1998
- Retired: July 12, 2018

Japanese name
- Kanji: 柴田嶺
- Kana: しばた りょう
Transcriptions
- Romanization: Shibata Ryō

Ryo Shibata (柴田 嶺, Shibata Ryō; born February 24, 1987) is a former Japanese competitive figure skater. He currently competes in pair skating with Narumi Takahashi.

== Personal life ==
Shibata was born on February 24, 1987, in Kushiro, Hokkaido, Japan.

The Japanese media called Shibata "the Japanese Johnny Weir". He was able to perform a Biellmann spin in competition.

== Career ==
Competing in men's singles, Shibata won two gold medals on the ISU Junior Grand Prix series and qualified to two ISU Junior Grand Prix Finals. He appeared at the 2003 and 2006 World Junior Championships, finishing 12th both times, and at three senior Grand Prix events. He retired in 2010.

On May 18, 2016, it was announced that Shibata had teamed up with pair skater, Narumi Takahashi, and that they would train in Geneva, Illinois, under Stefania Berton and Rockne Brubaker.

As a team, Takahashi/Shibata won the bronze medal at the 2017 Asian Open Trophy and the silver medal at the 2017–18 Japan Championships.

In March 2018, Takahashi announced her retirement from competitive figure skating and Shibata ultimately announced his retirement in July that same year.

== Programs ==
=== Pairs skating with Takahashi ===
Season	Short program	Free skating
2017–2018	A Moment to Remember by Kim Tae-won choreo. by Marina Zueva, Massimo Scali	Cinema Paradiso by Ennio Morricone choreo. by Marina Zueva, Massimo Scali
2013–2014	Méditation de Thaïs by Jules Massenet choreo. by Nikolai Morozov, Jamie Whyte	Turandot by Giacomo Puccini choreo. by Nikolai Morozov, Jamie Whyte

=== Singles skating ===
Season	Short program	Free skating
2007–08	Danse Macabre by Camille Saint-Saëns	Fantaisie Impromptu by Frédéric Chopin
2006–07	Hana's Eyes by Tonči Huljić	Adios Nonino by Astor Piazzolla
2005–06	Black Opal	Malaguena by Ernesto Lecuona
2004–05	Legends of the Fall by James Horner	Malaguena by Ernesto Lecuona
2002–03	Tempest by Kuniko Kawai	Amor de Verano by Kuniko Kawai

== Competitive highlights ==
GP: Grand Prix; JGP: Junior Grand Prix

=== Pairs with Takahashi ===
International
Event	2016–17	2017–18
Asian Games	6th	
Asian Trophy		3rd
National
Japan Championships	4th	2nd

=== Men's singles ===
International
Event	99–00	00–01	01–02	02–03	03–04	04–05	05–06	06–07	07–08	08–09	09–10
GP Cup of China								10th	12th		
GP Cup of Russia								12th			
Challenge Cup									5th		
International: Junior
Junior Worlds				12th			12th				
JGP Final						4th	7th				
JGP Andorra							1st				
JGP Croatia							3rd				
JGP Czech Rep.					14th						
JGP France						4th					
JGP Italy				12th							
JGP Romania						1st					
JGP Serbia				4th							
National
Japan Champ.				5th			11th	7th	8th	16th	15th
Japan Junior			6th	1st		6th	3rd				
Japan Novice	3rd A										
J = Junior level
