= 2020–21 ISU Grand Prix of Figure Skating =

- Type: Grand Prix
- Date: October 23 – December 13, 2020
- Season: 2020–21
- Previous: 2019–20 Grand Prix
- Next: 2021–22 Grand Prix

The 2020–21 ISU Grand Prix of Figure Skating was a series of senior international competitions organized by the International Skating Union that were held from October 2020 through December 2020. Medals were awarded in men's singles, ladies's singles, pair skating, and ice dance. Before modifications resulting from the COVID-19 pandemic, skaters would have earned points towards the World Standings and Season's World Ranking based on their placement at each event and the top six in each discipline would have qualified to compete at the Grand Prix Final in Beijing, China. Because of the pandemic, only four of the six events were held, while the Grand Prix Final also ultimately cancelled. The corresponding series for junior-level skaters would have been the 2020–21 ISU Junior Grand Prix, but the ISU announced its cancellation in July 2020.

== Reactions to the COVID-19 pandemic ==
On May 1, 2020, the International Skating Union established a working group, chaired by ISU Vice-president for Figure Skating Alexander Lakernik, to monitor the ongoing COVID-19 pandemic. Its responsibilities included determining the feasibility of holding events as scheduled, possibly behind closed doors, during the first half of the season, and the financial impact of any potential cancellations. The ISU announced that a host federation must make a decision regarding potential cancellation of their event at least twelve weeks prior to the event.

On July 9, the General Administration of Sport of China announced that no international sporting events would be held in China in 2020 except for 2022 Winter Olympics test events. The Chinese Skating Association was scheduled to host several events during the season, including the Cup of China, the Grand Prix Final, and the World Junior Championships. While the Grand Prix Final, scheduled to be hosted in Beijing, was exempt from the Chinese government's ruling due to its status as the test event for the Olympic Games, the ISU had not yet discussed a contingency plan regarding Grand Prix event cancellations at the time of the Chinese government's announcement. The ISU announced on July 13 that the Cup of China would remain as scheduled in Chongqing due to its connection to the Beijing test event: the Grand Prix Final.

On August 4, the ISU confirmed that the Grand Prix series would proceed as scheduled during the fall, with a decision to be made regarding the Grand Prix Final at a later date. The competitions were expected to feature skaters from the home country, skaters already training in the host nation, and skaters assigned to that event for geographic reasons; all officials would also be from the national organizing committee.

On September 25, U.S. Figure Skating announced that Skate America would be held without an audience in line with Nevada Gaming Control Board guidelines regarding the pandemic.

On September 30, the ISU announced that the Grand Prix Final would not be held as scheduled in Beijing on December 10–13, and that they were searching for an alternate host outside China for the event. On October 14, Skate Canada announced the cancellation of the 2020 Skate Canada International due to the worsening situation in Ontario. The French Federation of Ice Sports informed the ISU of the cancellation of the 2020 Internationaux de France on October 19.

On November 13, a joint adapted sports testing program developed by the Beijing 2022 planning committee, the International Olympic Committee, the International Paralympic Committee, and various winter sports federations, including the ISU, replaced all test events scheduled in Beijing. Despite the ongoing pandemic, the ISU announced that it would evaluate the possibility of finding alternative locations outside China and dates to replace the Grand Prix Final.

On December 10, the ISU announced the definitive cancellation of the Grand Prix Final alongside the cancellation of the 2021 European Championships.

The domestic nature of the competitions meant that no World Standings or Season's World Ranking points would be awarded to skaters and that scores received would not count for minimum TES requirements for ISU Championship competitions.

== Schedule ==
On October 14, Skate Canada announced the cancellation of the 2020 Skate Canada International, while the French Federation of Ice Sports announced the cancellation of the 2020 Internationaux de France on October 19.

The series included the following events:

Date	Event	Location	Notes	Ref.
October 23–24	(United States) 2020 Skate America	Las Vegas, Nevada, United States		
October 30–31	2020 Skate Canada International	Cancelled		
November 6–8	2020 Cup of China	Chongqing, China		
November 13–15	2020 Internationaux de France	Cancelled		
November 20–22	(Russia) 2020 Rostelecom Cup	Moscow, Russia		
November 27–29	(Japan) 2020 NHK Trophy	Osaka, Japan	No pairs	
December 10–13	(China) 2020–21 Grand Prix Final	Cancelled		

== Requirements ==
Skaters were eligible to compete on the senior Grand Prix circuit if they had reached the age of 15 before July 1, 2020. Due to the modified format, skaters were not required to have earned a minimum total score from certain international events.

== Assignments ==
As part of the ISU's efforts to mitigate the risks associated with the COVID-19 pandemic, skaters were limited to one assignment each. Assignments were released on October 1, 2020.

=== Men's singles ===
Nation	Skater	Assignment
Azerbaijan	Vladimir Litvintsev	Rostelecom Cup
Belarus	Alexander Lebedev	Rostelecom Cup
Canada	Keegan Messing	Skate America
China	Chen Yudong	Cup of China
China	Jin Boyang	Cup of China
China	Peng Zhiming	Cup of China
China	Xu Juwen	Cup of China
China	Yan Han	Cup of China
China	Zhang He	Cup of China
Georgia	Morisi Kvitelashvili	Rostelecom Cup
Israel	Alexei Bychenko	Skate America
Israel	Daniel Samohin	Skate America
Japan	Lucas Tsuyoshi Honda	NHK Trophy
Japan	Yuma Kagiyama	NHK Trophy
Japan	Yuto Kishina	NHK Trophy
Japan	Kao Miura	NHK Trophy
Japan	Sena Miyake	NHK Trophy
Japan	Shun Sato	NHK Trophy
Japan	Mitsuki Sumoto	NHK Trophy
Japan	Keiji Tanaka	NHK Trophy
Japan	Kazuki Tomono	NHK Trophy
Japan	Sōta Yamamoto	NHK Trophy
Japan	Nozomu Yoshioka	NHK Trophy
Russia	Dmitri Aliev	Rostelecom Cup
Russia	Petr Gumennik	Rostelecom Cup
Russia	Makar Ignatov	Rostelecom Cup
Russia	Mikhail Kolyada	Rostelecom Cup
Russia	Artem Kovalev	Rostelecom Cup
Russia	Andrei Mozalev	Rostelecom Cup
Russia	Roman Savosin	Rostelecom Cup
Russia	Evgeni Semenenko	Rostelecom Cup
Russia	Ilya Yablokov	Rostelecom Cup
United States	Nathan Chen	Skate America
United States	Tomoki Hiwatashi	Skate America
United States	Joseph Kang	Skate America
United States	Alexei Krasnozhon	Skate America
United States	Jimmy Ma	Skate America
United States	Ilia Malinin	Skate America
United States	Maxim Naumov	Skate America
United States	Camden Pulkinen	Skate America
United States	Vincent Zhou	Skate America

=== Ladies' singles ===
Nation	Skater	Assignment
Armenia	Anastasia Galustyan	Rostelecom Cup
Azerbaijan	Ekaterina Ryabova	Rostelecom Cup
Belarus	Viktoriia Safonova	Rostelecom Cup
China	Chen Hongyi	Cup of China
China	Jin Minzhi	Cup of China
China	Angel Li	Cup of China
China	Lin Shan	Skate America
China	Zhang Siyang	Cup of China
China	Zheng Lu	Cup of China
Estonia	Eva-Lotta Kiibus	Rostelecom Cup
Georgia	Alina Urushadze	Rostelecom Cup
Japan	Nana Araki	NHK Trophy
Japan	Wakaba Higuchi	NHK Trophy
Japan	Marin Honda	NHK Trophy
Japan	Tomoe Kawabata	NHK Trophy
Japan	Mana Kawabe	NHK Trophy
Japan	Rino Matsuike	NHK Trophy
Japan	Mai Mihara	NHK Trophy
Japan	Kaori Sakamoto	NHK Trophy
Japan	Chisato Uramatsu	NHK Trophy
Japan	Mako Yamashita	NHK Trophy
Japan	Yuhana Yokoi	NHK Trophy
Russia	Anastasiia Guliakova	Rostelecom Cup
Russia	Alena Kostornaia	Rostelecom Cup
Russia	Elizaveta Nugumanova	Rostelecom Cup
Russia	Sofia Samodurova	Rostelecom Cup
Russia	Alexandra Trusova	Rostelecom Cup
Russia	Elizaveta Tuktamysheva	Rostelecom Cup
South Korea	You Young	NHK Trophy
United States	Starr Andrews	Skate America
United States	Mariah Bell	Skate America
United States	Karen Chen	Skate America
United States	Amber Glenn	Skate America
United States	Gracie Gold	Skate America
United States	Finley Hawk	Skate America
United States	Pooja Kalyan	Skate America
United States	Paige Rydberg	Skate America
United States	Audrey Shin	Skate America
United States	Bradie Tennell	Skate America
United States	Sierra Venetta	Skate America

=== Pairs ===
Nation	Team	Assignment
China	Peng Cheng / Jin Yang	Cup of China
China	Wang Yuchen / Huang Yihang	Cup of China
China	Zhu Daizifei / Liu Yuhang	Cup of China
Hungary	Ioulia Chtchetinina / Márk Magyar	Rostelecom Cup
Israel	Anna Vernikov / Evgeni Krasnopolski	Skate America
Russia	Kseniia Akhanteva / Valerii Kolesov	Rostelecom Cup
Russia	Iuliia Artemeva / Mikhail Nazarychev	Rostelecom Cup
Russia	Aleksandra Boikova / Dmitrii Kozlovskii	Rostelecom Cup
Russia	Yasmina Kadyrova / Ivan Balchenko	Rostelecom Cup
Russia	Anastasia Mishina / Aleksandr Galliamov	Rostelecom Cup
Russia	Apollinariia Panfilova / Dmitry Rylov	Rostelecom Cup
United States	Ashley Cain-Gribble / Timothy LeDuc	Skate America
United States	Jessica Calalang / Brian Johnson	Skate America
United States	Emily Chan / Spencer Howe	Skate America
United States	Tarah Kayne / Danny O'Shea	Skate America
United States	Audrey Lu / Misha Mitrofanov	Skate America
United States	Alexa Scimeca Knierim / Brandon Frazier	Skate America
United States	Olivia Serafini / Mervin Tran	Skate America

=== Ice dance ===
Nation	Team	Assignment
Belarus	Viktoria Semenjuk / Ilya Yukhimuk	Rostelecom Cup
China	Chen Hong / Sun Zhuoming	Cup of China
China	Guo Yuzhu / Zhao Pengkun	Cup of China
China	Lin Yufei / Gao Zijian	Cup of China
China	Ning Wanqi / Wang Chao	Cup of China
China	Wang Shiyue / Liu Xinyu	Cup of China
Hungary	Emily Monaghan / Ilias Fourati	Skate America
Hungary	Anna Yanovskaya / Ádám Lukács	Rostelecom Cup
Japan	Rikako Fukase / Eichu Cho	NHK Trophy
Japan	Misato Komatsubara / Tim Koleto	NHK Trophy
Japan	Kana Muramoto / Daisuke Takahashi	NHK Trophy
Lithuania	Allison Reed / Saulius Ambrulevičius	Rostelecom Cup
Russia	Elizaveta Khudaiberdieva / Egor Bazin	Rostelecom Cup
Russia	Ekaterina Mironova / Evgenii Ustenko	Rostelecom Cup
Russia	Annabelle Morozov / Andrei Bagin	Rostelecom Cup
Russia	Anastasia Skoptsova / Kirill Aleshin	Rostelecom Cup
Russia	Victoria Sinitsina / Nikita Katsalapov	Rostelecom Cup
Russia	Tiffany Zahorski / Jonathan Guerreiro	Rostelecom Cup
Ukraine	Oleksandra Nazarova / Maxim Nikitin	Rostelecom Cup
United States	Christina Carreira / Anthony Ponomarenko	Skate America
United States	Molly Cesanek / Yehor Yehorov	Skate America
United States	Caroline Green / Michael Parsons	Skate America
United States	Kaitlin Hawayek / Jean-Luc Baker	Skate America
United States	Madison Hubbell / Zachary Donohue	Skate America
United States	Lorraine McNamara / Anton Spiridonov	Skate America
United States	Eva Pate / Logan Bye	Skate America

=== Changes to preliminary assignments ===
==== Skate America ====
Discipline	Withdrew		Added		Notes	Ref.
Discipline	Date	Skater(s)	Date	Skater(s)	Notes	Ref.
Pairs	—N/a		October 5	(United States) Emily Chan / Spencer Howe		
Men	October 7	(Canada) Stephen Gogolev	October 7	(Israel) Daniel Samohin	Injury	
Ladies	October 7	(United States) Gabriella Izzo	October 7	(United States) Paige Rydberg		
Pairs	October 8	(Russia) Evgenia Tarasova / Vladimir Morozov	October 13	(Israel) Anna Vernikov / Evgeni Krasnopolski	Event conflict	
Men	October 9	(Czech Republic) Michal Březina	October 9	(United States) Joseph Kang	Injury	
Ice dance	October 9	(United States) Madison Chock / Evan Bates	—N/a		Lack of preparation time	
Ice dance	October 9	(United States) Livvy Shilling / Alexander Petrov	—N/a			
Ice dance	—N/a		October 9	(Hungary) Emily Monaghan / Ilias Fourati		
Ladies	October 12	(United States) Isabelle Inthisone	October 12	(United States) Finley Hawk		
Ladies	October 12	(United States) Kate Wang	October 12	(United States) Sierra Venetta		

==== Cup of China ====
Discipline	Withdrew		Added		Notes	Ref.
Discipline	Date	Skater(s)	Date	Skater(s)	Notes	Ref.
Men	—N/a		October 16	(China) Peng Zhiming		
Men	—N/a		October 16	(China) Xu Juwen		
Ladies	—N/a		October 16	(China) Jin Minzhi		
Ladies	—N/a		October 16	(China) Angel Li		
Ladies	—N/a		October 16	(China) Zhang Siyang		
Ladies	—N/a		October 16	(China) Zheng Lu		
Ice dance	—N/a		October 16	(China) Lin Yufei / Gao Zijian		
Pairs	October 29	(China) Sui Wenjing / Han Cong	October 29	(China) Zhu Daizifei / Liu Yuhang	Recovery from surgery (Han)	
Pairs	October 29	(China) Tang Feiyao / Yang Yongchao	—N/a			

==== Rostelecom Cup ====
Discipline	Withdrew		Added		Notes	Ref.
Discipline	Date	Skater(s)	Date	Skater(s)	Notes	Ref.
Men	—N/a		October 9	(Belarus) Alexander Lebedev		
Ladies	—N/a		October 9	(Armenia) Anastasia Galustyan		
Pairs	—N/a		October 9	(Russia) Iuliia Artemeva / Mikhail Nazarychev		
Pairs	October 9	(Israel) Anna Vernikov / Evgeni Krasnopolski	October 9	(Russia) Kseniia Akhanteva / Valerii Kolesov		
Men	October 16	(Georgia (country)) Irakli Maysuradze	November 12	(Russia) Artem Kovalev		
Ice dance	October 16	(Georgia (country)) Maria Kazakova / Georgy Reviya	October 28	(Lithuania) Allison Reed / Saulius Ambrulevičius		
Ladies	—N/a		October 28	(Estonia) Eva-Lotta Kiibus		
Ice dance	November 4	(Russia) Ksenia Konkina / Pavel Drozd	November 7	(Hungary) Anna Yanovskaya / Ádám Lukács		
Men	November 12	(Russia) Artur Danielian	November 12	(Russia) Evgeni Semenenko	Recovery from surgery	
Pairs	November 12	(Russia) Daria Pavliuchenko / Denis Khodykin	November 13	(Russia) Yasmina Kadyrova / Ivan Balchenko	Respiratory infection (Khodykin)	
Ladies	November 16	(Russia) Evgenia Medvedeva	November 16	(Russia) Elizaveta Nugumanova	Recovery from injury	
Ice dance	November 16	(Russia) Sofia Shevchenko / Igor Eremenko	November 16	(Russia) Ekaterina Mironova / Evgenii Ustenko	COVID-19	
Ice dance	November 16	(Russia) Alexandra Stepanova / Ivan Bukin	November 16	(Belarus) Viktoria Semenjuk / Ilya Yukhimuk	COVID-19	
Men	November 17	(Russia) Alexander Samarin	November 17	(Russia) Ilya Yablokov	Recovery from injury	
Pairs	November 18	(Russia) Alina Pepeleva / Roman Pleshkov	—N/a		COVID-19 (coach)	

==== NHK Trophy ====
Discipline	Withdrew		Added		Notes	Ref.
Discipline	Date	Skater(s)	Date	Skater(s)	Notes	Ref.
Ladies	—N/a		October 19	(South Korea) You Young		

== Medal summary ==
Event	Discipline	Gold	Silver	Bronze
(United States) Skate America	Men	(United States) Nathan Chen	(United States) Vincent Zhou	(Canada) Keegan Messing
(United States) Skate America	Ladies	(United States) Mariah Bell	(United States) Bradie Tennell	(United States) Audrey Shin
(United States) Skate America	Pairs	(United States) Alexa Scimeca Knierim / Brandon Frazier	(United States) Jessica Calalang / Brian Johnson	(United States) Audrey Lu / Misha Mitrofanov
(United States) Skate America	Ice dance	(United States) Madison Hubbell / Zachary Donohue	(United States) Kaitlin Hawayek / Jean-Luc Baker	(United States) Christina Carreira / Anthony Ponomarenko

Event	Discipline	Gold	Silver	Bronze
Cup of China	Men	(China) Jin Boyang	(China) Yan Han	(China) Chen Yudong
Cup of China	Ladies	(China) Chen Hongyi	(China) Angel Li	(China) Jin Minzhi
Cup of China	Pairs	(China) Peng Cheng / Jin Yang	(China) Wang Yuchen / Huang Yihang	(China) Zhu Daizifei / Liu Yuhang
Cup of China	Ice dance	(China) Wang Shiyue / Liu Xinyu	(China) Chen Hong / Sun Zhuoming	(China) Ning Wanqi / Wang Chao

Event	Discipline	Gold	Silver	Bronze
(Russia) Rostelecom Cup	Men	(Russia) Mikhail Kolyada	(Georgia (country)) Morisi Kvitelashvili	(Russia) Petr Gumennik
(Russia) Rostelecom Cup	Ladies	(Russia) Elizaveta Tuktamysheva	(Russia) Alena Kostornaia	(Russia) Anastasiia Guliakova
(Russia) Rostelecom Cup	Pairs	(Russia) Aleksandra Boikova / Dmitrii Kozlovskii	(Russia) Anastasia Mishina / Aleksandr Galliamov	(Russia) Apollinariia Panfilova / Dmitry Rylov
(Russia) Rostelecom Cup	Ice dance	(Russia) Victoria Sinitsina / Nikita Katsalapov	(Russia) Tiffany Zahorski / Jonathan Guerreiro	(Russia) Anastasia Skoptsova / Kirill Aleshin

Event	Discipline	Gold	Silver	Bronze
(Japan) NHK Trophy	Men	(Japan) Yuma Kagiyama	(Japan) Kazuki Tomono	(Japan) Lucas Tsuyoshi Honda
(Japan) NHK Trophy	Ladies	(Japan) Kaori Sakamoto	(Japan) Wakaba Higuchi	(Japan) Rino Matsuike
(Japan) NHK Trophy	Pairs	No pairs competition		
(Japan) NHK Trophy	Ice dance	(Japan) Misato Komatsubara / Tim Koleto	(Japan) Rikako Fukase / Eichu Cho	(Japan) Kana Muramoto / Daisuke Takahashi

=== Medal standings ===
The competitions were largely domestic events due to the pandemic, leading to skaters from the home country dominating the medals table at each respective event.

Rank	Nation	Gold	Silver	Bronze	Total
1	China	4	4	4	12
2	United States	4	4	3	11
3	Russia	4	3	4	11
4	Japan	3	3	3	9
5	Georgia	0	1	0	1
6	Canada	0	0	1	1
Totals (6 entries)		15	15	15	45

== Top scores ==
The scores awarded on the 2020–21 Grand Prix did not count for minimum TES requirements for the ISU Championships and did not count as official personal bests, season's bests, or world records.

=== Men's singles ===
Top 10 best scores in the men's combined total
No.	Skater	Nation	Score	Event
1	Nathan Chen	United States	299.15	2020 Skate America
2	Jin Boyang	China	290.89	2020 Cup of China
3	Mikhail Kolyada	Russia	281.89	2020 Rostelecom Cup
4	Yuma Kagiyama	Japan	275.87	2020 NHK Trophy
5	Morisi Kvitelashvili	Georgia	275.80	2020 Rostelecom Cup
6	Vincent Zhou	United States	275.10	2020 Skate America
7	Petr Gumennik	Russia	268.47	2020 Rostelecom Cup
8	Andrei Mozalev	Russia	266.69	2020 Rostelecom Cup
9	Keegan Messing	Canada	266.42	2020 Skate America
10	Dmitri Aliev	Russia	265.11	2020 Rostelecom Cup

Top 10 best scores in the men's short program
No.	Skater	Nation	Score	Event
1	Nathan Chen	United States	111.17	2020 Skate America
2	Jin Boyang	China	103.94	2020 Cup of China
3	Morisi Kvitelashvili	Georgia	99.56	2020 Rostelecom Cup
4	Vincent Zhou	United States	99.36	2020 Skate America
5	Petr Gumennik	Russia	96.26	2020 Rostelecom Cup
6	Mikhail Kolyada	Russia	93.34	2020 Rostelecom Cup
7	Yan Han	China	92.56	2020 Cup of China
8	Keegan Messing	Canada	92.40	2020 Skate America
9	Makar Ignatov	Russia	91.82	2020 Rostelecom Cup
10	Dmitri Aliev	Russia	89.62	2020 Rostelecom Cup

Top 10 best scores in the men's free skating
No.	Skater	Nation	Score	Event
1	Yuma Kagiyama	Japan	188.61	2020 NHK Trophy
2	Mikhail Kolyada	Russia	188.55	2020 Rostelecom Cup
3	Nathan Chen	United States	187.98	2020 Skate America
4	Jin Boyang	China	186.95	2020 Cup of China
5	Andrei Mozalev	Russia	180.68	2020 Rostelecom Cup
6	Evgeni Semenenko	Russia	177.36	2020 Rostelecom Cup
7	Morisi Kvitelashvili	Georgia	176.24	2020 Rostelecom Cup
8	Dmitri Aliev	Russia	175.49	2020 Rostelecom Cup
9	Vincent Zhou	United States	175.47	2020 Skate America
10	Keegan Messing	Canada	174.02	2020 Skate America

=== Ladies' singles ===
Top 10 best scores in the ladies' combined total
No.	Skater	Nation	Score	Event
1	Kaori Sakamoto	Japan	229.51	2020 NHK Trophy
2	Elizaveta Tuktamysheva	Russia	223.39	2020 Rostelecom Cup
3	Alena Kostornaia	Russia	220.78	2020 Rostelecom Cup
4	Mariah Bell	United States	212.73	2020 Skate America
5	Bradie Tennell	United States	211.07	2020 Skate America
6	Audrey Shin	United States	206.15	2020 Skate America
7	Karen Chen	United States	204.90	2020 Skate America
8	Wakaba Higuchi	Japan	200.98	2020 NHK Trophy
9	Anastasiia Guliakova	Russia	199.03	2020 Rostelecom Cup
10	Rino Matsuike	Japan	198.97	2020 NHK Trophy

Top 10 best scores in the ladies' short program
No.	Skater	Nation	Score	Event
1	Alena Kostornaia	Russia	78.84	2020 Rostelecom Cup
2	Mariah Bell	United States	76.48	2020 Skate America
3	Kaori Sakamoto	Japan	75.60	2020 NHK Trophy
4	Elizaveta Tuktamysheva	Russia	74.70	2020 Rostelecom Cup
5	Bradie Tennell	United States	73.29	2020 Skate America
6	Alexandra Trusova	Russia	70.81	2020 Rostelecom Cup
7	Anastasiia Guliakova	Russia	70.07	2020 Rostelecom Cup
8	Audrey Shin	United States	69.77	2020 Skate America
9	Wakaba Higuchi	Japan	69.71	2020 NHK Trophy
10	Elizaveta Nugumanova	Russia	68.47	2020 Rostelecom Cup

Top 10 best scores in the ladies' free skating
No.	Skater	Nation	Score	Event
1	Kaori Sakamoto	Japan	153.91	2020 NHK Trophy
2	Elizaveta Tuktamysheva	Russia	148.69	2020 Rostelecom Cup
3	Alena Kostornaia	Russia	141.94	2020 Rostelecom Cup
4	Bradie Tennell	United States	137.78	2020 Skate America
5	Karen Chen	United States	136.77	2020 Skate America
6	Audrey Shin	United States	136.38	2020 Skate America
7	Mariah Bell	United States	136.25	2020 Skate America
8	Rino Matsuike	Japan	133.23	2020 NHK Trophy
9	Mai Mihara	Japan	131.32	2020 NHK Trophy
10	Wakaba Higuchi	Japan	131.27	2020 NHK Trophy

=== Pairs ===
Top 10 best scores in the pairs' combined total
No.	Team	Nation	Score	Event
1	Aleksandra Boikova / Dmitrii Kozlovskii	Russia	232.56	2020 Rostelecom Cup
2	Anastasia Mishina / Aleksandr Galliamov	Russia	225.80	2020 Rostelecom Cup
3	Peng Cheng / Jin Yang	China	223.90	2020 Cup of China
4	Alexa Scimeca Knierim / Brandon Frazier	United States	214.77	2020 Skate America
5	Apollinariia Panfilova / Dmitry Rylov	Russia	210.07	2020 Rostelecom Cup
6	Jessica Calalang / Brian Johnson	United States	207.40	2020 Skate America
7	Yasmina Kadyrova / Ivan Balchenko	Russia	204.67	2020 Rostelecom Cup
8	Iuliia Artemeva / Mikhail Nazarychev	Russia	200.77	2020 Rostelecom Cup
9	Audrey Lu / Misha Mitrofanov	United States	189.65	2020 Skate America
10	Ashley Cain-Gribble / Timothy LeDuc	United States	189.23	2020 Skate America

Top 10 best scores in the pairs' short program
No.	Team	Nation	Score	Event
1	Anastasia Mishina / Aleksandr Galliamov	Russia	79.34	2020 Rostelecom Cup
2	Aleksandra Boikova / Dmitrii Kozlovskii	Russia	78.29	2020 Rostelecom Cup
3	Peng Cheng / Jin Yang	China	75.62	2020 Cup of China
4	Alexa Scimeca Knierim / Brandon Frazier	United States	74.19	2020 Skate America
5	Apollinariia Panfilova / Dmitry Rylov	Russia	73.84	2020 Rostelecom Cup
6	Jessica Calalang / Brian Johnson	United States	71.08	2020 Skate America
7	Yasmina Kadyrova / Ivan Balchenko	Russia	70.62	2020 Rostelecom Cup
8	Iuliia Artemeva / Mikhail Nazarychev	Russia	70.11	2020 Rostelecom Cup
9	Audrey Lu / Misha Mitrofanov	United States	67.52	2020 Skate America
10	Kseniia Akhanteva / Valerii Kolesov	Russia	67.50	2020 Rostelecom Cup

Top 10 best scores in the pairs' free skating
No.	Team	Nation	Score	Event
1	Aleksandra Boikova / Dmitrii Kozlovskii	Russia	154.27	2020 Rostelecom Cup
2	Peng Cheng / Jin Yang	China	148.28	2020 Cup of China
3	Anastasia Mishina / Aleksandr Galliamov	Russia	146.46	2020 Rostelecom Cup
4	Alexa Scimeca Knierim / Brandon Frazier	United States	140.58	2020 Skate America
5	Jessica Calalang / Brian Johnson	United States	136.32	2020 Skate America
6	Apollinariia Panfilova / Dmitry Rylov	Russia	136.23	2020 Rostelecom Cup
7	Yasmina Kadyrova / Ivan Balchenko	Russia	134.05	2020 Rostelecom Cup
8	Iuliia Artemeva / Mikhail Nazarychev	Russia	130.66	2020 Rostelecom Cup
9	Ashley Cain-Gribble / Timothy LeDuc	United States	125.02	2020 Skate America
10	Audrey Lu / Misha Mitrofanov	United States	122.13	2020 Skate America

=== Ice dance ===
Top 10 season's best scores in the combined total (ice dance)
No.	Team	Nation	Score	Event
1	Victoria Sinitsina / Nikita Katsalapov	Russia	217.51	2020 Rostelecom Cup
2	Madison Hubbell / Zachary Donohue	United States	211.39	2020 Skate America
3	Tiffany Zahorski / Jonathan Guerreiro	Russia	206.91	2020 Rostelecom Cup
4	Wang Shiyue / Liu Xinyu	China	206.84	2020 Cup of China
5	Kaitlin Hawayek / Jean-Luc Baker	United States	202.47	2020 Skate America
6	Anastasia Skoptsova / Kirill Aleshin	Russia	199.25	2020 Rostelecom Cup
7	Elizaveta Khudaiberdieva / Egor Bazin	Russia	193.18	2020 Rostelecom Cup
8	Chen Hong / Sun Zhuoming	China	192.26	2020 Cup of China
9	Annabelle Morozov / Andrei Bagin	Russia	191.00	2020 Rostelecom Cup
10	Oleksandra Nazarova / Maxim Nikitin	Ukraine	188.25	2020 Rostelecom Cup

Top 10 season's best scores in the rhythm dance
No.	Team	Nation	Score	Event
1	Victoria Sinitsina / Nikita Katsalapov	Russia	91.13	2020 Rostelecom Cup
2	Madison Hubbell / Zachary Donohue	United States	85.30	2020 Skate America
3	Tiffany Zahorski / Jonathan Guerreiro	Russia	84.46	2020 Rostelecom Cup
4	Wang Shiyue / Liu Xinyu	China	84.23	2020 Cup of China
5	Kaitlin Hawayek / Jean-Luc Baker	United States	81.15	2020 Skate America
6	Anastasia Skoptsova / Kirill Aleshin	Russia	79.75	2020 Rostelecom Cup
7	Christina Carreira / Anthony Ponomarenko	United States	78.63	2020 Skate America
8	Chen Hong / Sun Zhuoming	China	76.57	2020 Cup of China
9	Annabelle Morozov / Andrei Bagin	Russia	76.21	2020 Rostelecom Cup
10	Elizaveta Khudaiberdieva / Egor Bazin	Russia	76.10	2020 Rostelecom Cup

Top 10 season's best scores in the free dance
No.	Team	Nation	Score	Event
1	Victoria Sinitsina / Nikita Katsalapov	Russia	126.38	2020 Rostelecom Cup
2	Madison Hubbell / Zachary Donohue	United States	126.09	2020 Skate America
3	Wang Shiyue / Liu Xinyu	China	122.61	2020 Cup of China
4	Tiffany Zahorski / Jonathan Guerreiro	Russia	122.45	2020 Rostelecom Cup
5	Kaitlin Hawayek / Jean-Luc Baker	United States	121.32	2020 Skate America
6	Anastasia Skoptsova / Kirill Aleshin	Russia	119.50	2020 Rostelecom Cup
7	Elizaveta Khudaiberdieva / Egor Bazin	Russia	117.08	2020 Rostelecom Cup
8	Chen Hong / Sun Zhuoming	China	115.69	2020 Cup of China
9	Annabelle Morozov / Andrei Bagin	Russia	114.79	2020 Rostelecom Cup
10	Oleksandra Nazarova / Maxim Nikitin	Ukraine	113.39	2020 Rostelecom Cup
