= 2019–20 Japan Figure Skating Championships =

Figure skating competition

- Type: National championship
- Date: December 18–22, 2019 (S); November 15–17, 2019 (J)
- Season: 2019–20
- Location: Shibuya, Tokyo (S); Yokohama, Kanagawa (J)

Champions
- Men's singles: Shoma Uno (S); Yuma Kagiyama (J)
- Ladies' singles: Rika Kihira (S); Mana Kawabe (J)
- Pairs: Riku Miura / Ryuichi Kihara (S)
- Ice dance: Misato Komatsubara / Tim Koleto (S); Utana Yoshida / Shingo Nishiyama (J)
- Previous: 2018–19 Japan Championships
- Next: 2020–21 Japan Championships

The 2019–20 Japan Figure Skating Championships were held in Shibuya, Tokyo from December 18–22, 2019. It was the 88th edition of the event. Medals were awarded in the disciplines of men's singles, ladies' singles, pair skating, and ice dance. The results were part of the Japanese selection criteria for the 2020 World Championships, the 2020 Four Continents Championships, and the 2020 World Junior Championships.

== Qualifying ==
Competitors either qualified at regional and sectional competitions, held from September to November 2019, or earned a bye.

Date	Event	Type	Location	Results
September 20–23, 2019	Tohoku-Hokkaido	Regional	Hachinohe, Aomori	Details
September 20–23, 2019	Tokyo	Regional	Nishitōkyō, Tokyo	Details
September 26–29, 2019	Chu-Shikoku-Kyushu	Regional	Fukuoka, Fukuoka	Details
September 27–29, 2019	Chubu	Regional	Nagoya, Aichi	Details
October 3–6, 2019	Kanto	Regional	Kōfu, Yamanashi	Details
October 3–6, 2019	Kinki	Regional	Ōtsu, Shiga	Details
October 24–27, 2019	Eastern Section	Sectional	Karuizawa, Nagano	Details
November 1–4, 2019	Western Section	Sectional	Ōtsu, Shiga	Details
November 15–17, 2019	Japan Junior Championships	Final	Yokohama, Kanagawa	Details
December 18–22, 2019	Japan Championships	Final	Shibuya, Tokyo	Details

== Entries ==
=== Senior ===
A list of preliminary entries was published in December 2019. Names with an asterisk (*) denote junior skaters.

Men	Ladies	Pairs	Ice dance
Reo Ishizuka	Hinano Isobe	Riku Miura / Ryuichi Kihara	Yuka Edamura / Daiki Shimazaki
Shoma Uno	Chihiro Inoue		Misato Komatsubara / Tim Koleto
Naoki Oda	Chisato Uramatsu*		Kiria Hirayama / Kenta Ishibashi
Yuma Kagiyama*	Miyabi Oba		Rikako Fukase / Oliver Zhang
Hidetsugu Kamata	Rika Oya		
Yuto Kishina*	Rino Kasakake		
Kazuki Kushida	Tomoe Kawabata*		
Yuki Kunikata	Mana Kawabe*		
Shun Sato*	Rika Kihira		
Hiroaki Sato	Kaori Sakamoto		
Koshiro Shimada	Ibuki Sato		
Jun Suzuki	~~Yuna Shiraiwa~~ (withdrew)		
Mitsuki Sumoto	Niina Takeno		
Daisuke Takahashi	Hina Takeno		
Keiji Tanaka	Mone Chiba*		
Tatsuya Tsuboi*	Kona Tsuuchi		
Junsuke Tokikuni	Yuka Nagai		
Kazuki Tomono	Rin Nitaya		
Kosuke Nakano	Wakaba Higuchi		
Shu Nakamura	Honoka Hirotani		
Yuzuru Hanyu	Marin Honda		
Ryuju Hino	Yura Matsuda		
Taichi Honda	Akari Matsubara		
Lucas Tsuyoshi Honda*	Saki Miyake		
Taichiro Yamakuma	Satoko Miyahara		
Koshin Yamada	Mako Yamashita		
Sōta Yamamoto	Sakura Yamada		
Takayuki Yamamoto	Yuhana Yokoi		
Nozomu Yoshioka*	Shiika Yoshioka*		
Junya Watanabe	Hana Yoshida*		

=== Junior ===
The top six finishers at the Japan Junior Championships in men's and ladies' singles were added to the Japan Championships. The fourth-place finisher in ladies, Momoka Hatasaki, was a novice skater and not eligible for the senior Championships, resulting in seventh-place finisher Chisato Uramatsu being bumped up in her place.

	Men	Ladies
1	Yuma Kagiyama	Mana Kawabe
2	Shun Sato	Tomoe Kawabata
3	Lucas Tsuyoshi Honda	Hana Yoshida
4	Tatsuya Tsuboi	Shiika Yoshioka
5	Nozomu Yoshioka	Mone Chiba
6	Yuto Kishina	Chisato Uramatsu

=== Changes to preliminary entries ===
Date	Discipline	Withdrew	Added	Reason/Other notes	Refs
December 18	Ladies	Yuna Shiraiwa	N/A	Injury (right knee, leg)	

== Medal summary ==
=== Senior ===
Discipline	Gold	Silver	Bronze
Men	Shoma Uno	Yuzuru Hanyu	Yuma Kagiyama
Ladies	Rika Kihira	Wakaba Higuchi	Tomoe Kawabata
Pairs	Riku Miura / Ryuichi Kihara	no other competitors	
Ice dance	Misato Komatsubara / Tim Koleto	Rikako Fukase / Oliver Zhang	Kiria Hirayama / Kenta Ishibashi

=== Junior ===
Discipline	Gold	Silver	Bronze
Men	Yuma Kagiyama	Shun Sato	Lucas Tsuyoshi Honda
Ladies	Mana Kawabe	Tomoe Kawabata	Hanna Yoshida
Pairs	no competitors		
Ice dance	Utana Yoshida / Shingo Nishiyama	Ayumi Takanami / Yoshimitsu Ikeda	no other competitors

== Results ==
=== Men ===
Rank	Name	Total points	SP		FS	
1	Shoma Uno	290.57	2	105.71	1	184.86
2	Yuzuru Hanyu	282.77	1	110.72	3	172.05
3	Yuma Kagiyama	257.99	7	77.41	2	180.58
4	Keiji Tanaka	252.44	4	80.90	5	171.54
5	Shun Sato	246.50	3	82.68	6	163.82
6	Kazuki Tomono	244.69	11	73.06	4	171.63
7	Sōta Yamamoto	220.49	13	68.16	7	152.33
8	Mitsuki Sumoto	220.28	12	72.81	8	147.47
9	Hiroaki Sato	215.23	6	78.84	11	136.39
10	Koshiro Shimada	212.24	5	80.59	13	131.65
11	Lucas Tsuyoshi Honda	209.96	9	75.72	12	134.24
12	Daisuke Takahashi	204.31	14	65.95	10	138.36
13	Ryuju Hino	202.73	18	62.47	9	140.26
14	Yuto Kishina	198.77	8	77.15	18	121.62
15	Taichiro Yamakuma	194.01	15	64.88	14	129.13
16	Shu Nakamura	193.39	10	74.39	19	119.00
17	Jun Suzuki	189.30	17	63.49	16	125.81
18	Kazuki Kushida	187.38	23	58.66	15	128.72
19	Nozomu Yoshioka	180.62	16	64.56	20	116.06
20	Junya Watanabe	180.38	24	58.21	17	122.17
21	Koshin Yamada	173.35	19	62.17	22	111.18
22	Taichi Honda	173.08	20	61.22	21	111.86
23	Takayuki Yamamoto	150.06	22	59.27	23	90.79
WD	Naoki Oda	withdrew	21	61.18	withdrew from competition	
Did not advance to free skating
25	Kosuke Nakano	56.92	25	56.92	—	
26	Hidetsugu Kamata	55.30	26	55.30	—	
27	Junsuke Tokikuni	53.59	27	53.59	—	
28	Reo Ishizuka	52.41	28	52.41	—	
29	Yuki Kunikata	46.36	29	46.36	—	
WD	Tatsuya Tsuboi	withdrew	withdrew from competition			

=== Ladies ===
Rank	Name	Total points	SP		FS	
1	Rika Kihira	229.20	1	73.98	1	155.22
2	Wakaba Higuchi	206.61	4	68.10	2	138.51
3	Tomoe Kawabata	193.96	7	65.53	3	128.43
4	Satoko Miyahara	191.43	2	70.11	6	121.32
5	Yuhana Yokoi	190.92	9	62.90	4	128.02
6	Kaori Sakamoto	188.26	3	69.95	7	118.31
7	Rin Nitaya	184.26	10	62.27	5	121.99
8	Marin Honda	181.34	6	65.92	8	115.42
9	Yuka Nagai	173.88	8	64.78	12	109.10
10	Shiika Yoshioka	171.44	11	60.89	11	110.55
11	Mako Yamashita	170.75	5	66.64	16	104.11
12	Saki Miyake	169.51	16	54.26	9	115.25
13	Mana Kawabe	169.28	14	56.52	10	112.76
14	Hina Takeno	168.57	12	59.52	13	109.05
15	Chisato Uramatsu	167.21	13	59.16	14	108.05
16	Akari Matsubara	155.31	23	50.43	15	104.88
17	Hinano Isobe	152.59	19	51.45	17	101.14
18	Mone Chiba	150.50	17	52.76	19	97.74
19	Hana Yoshida	149.72	21	50.96	18	98.76
20	Ibuki Sato	146.14	24	50.35	20	95.79
21	Yura Matsuda	146.05	18	52.34	21	93.71
22	Honoka Hirotani	143.63	15	54.68	22	88.95
23	Sakura Yamada	138.92	20	50.99	23	87.93
24	Kona Tsuuchi	136.42	22	50.83	24	85.59
Did not advance to free skating
25	Chihiro Inoue	47.54	25	47.54	—	
26	Rino Kasakake	47.52	26	47.52	—	
27	Niina Takeno	46.06	27	46.06	—	
28	Miyabi Oba	45.33	28	45.33	—	
29	Rika Oya	35.98	29	35.98	—	

=== Pairs ===
Rank	Name	Total points	SP		FS	
1	Riku Miura / Ryuichi Kihara	170.11	1	53.95	1	116.16

=== Ice dance ===
Rank	Name	Total points	RD		FD	
1	Misato Komatsubara / Tim Koleto	163.31	1	63.79	1	99.52
2	Rikako Fukase / Oliver Zhang	146.55	2	59.77	2	86.78
3	Kiria Hirayama / Kenta Ishibashi	138.13	4	54.68	3	83.45
4	Yuka Edamura / Daiki Shimazaki	131.02	3	55.35	4	75.67

== Japan Junior Figure Skating Championships ==
The 2019–20 Junior Championships were held on November 15–17, 2019 in Yokohama, Kanagawa. There was no junior pairs competition.

=== Men ===
Rank	Name	Total points	SP		FS	
1	Yuma Kagiyama	251.01	1	79.92	1	171.09
2	Shun Sato	213.20	3	74.19	2	139.01
3	Lucas Tsuyoshi Honda	194.75	4	74.14	6	120.61
4	Tatsuya Tsuboi	192.77	6	68.83	3	123.94
5	Nozomu Yoshioka	184.35	9	61.98	5	122.37
6	Yuto Kishina	183.57	2	74.29	12	109.28
7	Sena Miyake	180.56	5	70.53	11	110.03
8	Kao Miura	180.40	15	57.86	4	122.54
9	Shingo Nishiyama	175.94	8	64.59	8	111.35
10	Takeru Amine Kataise	175.12	14	59.08	7	116.04
11	Kosho Oshima	169.43	13	59.16	9	110.27
12	Ryusei Kikuchi	166.66	10	61.80	16	104.86
13	Kazuki Hasegawa	165.35	12	60.44	15	104.91
14	Shunsuke Nakamura	164.93	16	57.80	13	107.13
15	Haruya Sasaki	163.49	7	64.69	18	98.80
16	Keisuke Kadowaki	161.55	11	61.35	17	100.20
17	Shuntaro Asaga	159.51	17	49.38	10	110.13
18	Takumi Sugiyama	150.16	24	44.11	14	106.05
19	Sumitada Moriguchi	145.08	19	47.50	19	97.58
20	Haru Kakiuchi	132.85	18	47.88	20	84.97
21	Ryoga Morimoto	129.15	21	45.80	21	83.35
22	Shuji Fujishiro	126.09	23	44.60	22	81.49
23	Minato Shiga	124.71	22	44.70	23	80.01
24	Yoshimasa Hori	123.35	20	46.58	24	76.77
Did not advance to free skating
25	Ibuki Oonaka	43.07	25	43.07	—	
26	Sakura Odagaki	42.37	26	42.37	—	
27	Kairi Kato	42.19	27	42.19	—	
28	Tomoki Kimura	40.02	28	40.02	—	
29	Hiroto Honda	34.59	29	34.59	—	

=== Ladies ===
Rank	Name	Total points	SP		FS	
1	Mana Kawabe	193.57	1	64.95	1	128.62
2	Tomoe Kawabata	178.95	2	63.55	2	115.40
3	Hana Yoshida	167.86	10	52.75	3	115.11
4	Momoka Hatasaki	164.95	8	56.32	4	108.63
5	Shiika Yoshioka	163.63	4	60.78	7	102.85
6	Mone Chiba	161.59	7	56.51	6	106.58
7	Chisato Uramatsu	158.28	11	52.47	5	105.81
8	Moa Iwano	157.92	6	58.31	11	99.61
9	Rino Matsuike	156.70	3	61.91	14	94.79
10	Azusa Tanaka	153.93	5	58.58	13	95.35
11	Kinayu Yokoi	150.73	15	50.16	9	100.57
12	Rika Tejima	150.57	17	49.19	8	101.38
13	Rei Yoshimoto	148.51	12	52.21	12	96.30
14	Ayumi Shibayama	148.44	22	47.97	10	100.47
15	Riko Takino	145.12	13	52.01	15	93.11
16	Nana Araki	141.54	9	54.24	19	87.30
17	Kiri Hirakane	140.49	16	49.71	17	90.78
18	Marisa Yoda	140.48	21	48.67	16	91.81
19	Maria Egawa	136.97	14	50.34	20	86.63
20	Serina Okada	136.21	23	46.45	18	89.76
21	Natsu Suzuki	134.95	18	49.19	21	85.76
22	Noa Hozumi	129.63	20	48.86	22	80.77
23	Kana Yanagawa	126.09	24	46.13	23	79.96
24	Yukari Yamane	117.29	19	48.86	24	68.43
Did not advance to free skating
25	Sakurako Tanabe	45.75	25	45.75	—	
26	Himari Miura	44.67	26	44.67	—	
27	Ryo Nakagawa	44.18	27	44.18	—	
28	Sara Honda	41.62	28	41.62	—	
29	Miyu Yunoki	40.34	29	40.34	—	
30	Hinako Katayama	36.85	30	36.85	—	

=== Ice dance ===
Rank	Name	Total points	RD		FD	
1	Utana Yoshida / Shingo Nishiyama	147.55	1	57.49	1	90.06
2	Ayumi Takanami / Yoshimitsu Ikeda	130.21	2	53.93	2	76.28

== International team selections ==
=== World Championships ===
The 2020 World Figure Skating Championships were held in Montreal, Quebec, Canada from March 16–22, 2020. Japan Skating Federation announced the team on December 22, 2019.

	Men	Ladies	Pairs	Ice dance
1	Shoma Uno	Rika Kihira	Riku Miura / Ryuichi Kihara	Misato Komatsubara / Tim Koleto
2	Yuzuru Hanyu	Wakaba Higuchi		
3	Keiji Tanaka	Satoko Miyahara		
1st alt.	Kazuki Tomono	Kaori Sakamoto		
2nd alt.	Sōta Yamamoto	Yuhana Yokoi		

=== Four Continents Championships ===
The 2020 Four Continents Figure Skating Championships will be held in Seoul, South Korea from February 4–9, 2020. JSF announced the team on December 22, 2019.

	Men	Ladies	Pairs	Ice dance
1	~~Shoma Uno~~ (withdrew)	Rika Kihira	Riku Miura / Ryuichi Kihara	Misato Komatsubara / Tim Koleto
2	Yuzuru Hanyu	Wakaba Higuchi		Rikako Fukase / Oliver Zhang
3	Yuma Kagiyama	Kaori Sakamoto		
1st alt.	Kazuki Tomono (called up)	Yuhana Yokoi		
2nd alt.	Sōta Yamamoto	Marin Honda		

=== World Junior Championships ===
Commonly referred to as "Junior Worlds", the 2020 World Junior Figure Skating Championships took place in Tallinn, Estonia from March 2–8, 2020. Junior national champions Yuma Kagiyama and Mana Kawabe earned automatic berths and were named to the team on November 17, 2019. The remainder of the team was determined by JSF following the senior championships, and was named on December 22, 2019.

	Men	Ladies	Ice dance
1	Yuma Kagiyama	Mana Kawabe	Utana Yoshida / Shingo Nishiyama
2	Shun Sato	Tomoe Kawabata	
1st alt.	Lucas Tsuyoshi Honda	Shiika Yoshioka	Ayumi Takanami / Yoshimitsu Ikeda
2nd alt.	Mitsuki Sumoto		

=== Winter Youth Olympics ===
The 2020 Winter Youth Olympics will be held in Lausanne, Switzerland from January 10–15, 2020. The Japan Skating Federation announced the entries on November 17, 2019.

	Men	Ladies	Ice dance
1	Yuma Kagiyama	Mana Kawabe	Utana Yoshida / Shingo Nishiyama
Alt.	Shun Sato	Rino Matsuike	N/A
