= 2018–19 Japan Figure Skating Championships =

Figure skating competition

- Type: National championship
- Date: December 20ー24, 2018 (S); November 23ー25, 2018 (J)
- Season: 2018–19
- Location: Osaka (S); Fukuoka (J)

Champions
- Men's singles: Shoma Uno (S); Tatsuya Tsuboi (J)
- Ladies' singles: Kaori Sakamoto (S); Yuhana Yokoi (J)
- Pairs: Miu Suzaki / Ryuichi Kihara (S)
- Ice dance: Misato Komatsubara / Tim Koleto (S); Ayumi Takanami / Yoshimitsu Ikeda (J)
- Previous: 2017–18 Japan Championships
- Next: 2019–20 Japan Championships

The 2018–19 Japan Figure Skating Championships were held on December 20–24, 2018 in Osaka. It was the 87th edition of the event. Medals were awarded in the disciplines of men's singles, ladies' singles, pair skating, and ice dancing.

== Results ==
=== Men ===
Rank	Name	Total points	SP		FS	
1	Shoma Uno	289.10	1	102.06	1	187.04
2	Daisuke Takahashi	239.62	2	88.52	4	151.10
3	Keiji Tanaka	236.45	4	79.32	2	157.13
4	Kazuki Tomono	227.46	7	73.09	3	154.37
5	Koshiro Shimada	219.78	3	80.46	11	139.32
6	Yuma Kagiyama	216.36	6	74.51	6	141.85
7	Tatsuya Tsuboi	214.87	11	69.95	5	144.92
8	Yuto Kishina	214.35	8	72.96	7	141.39
9	Sōta Yamamoto	212.69	10	71.95	8	140.74
10	Taichiro Yamakuma	212.23	9	72.73	10	139.50
11	Shu Nakamura	211.69	5	77.11	13	134.58
12	Shun Sato	204.95	16	64.89	9	140.06
13	Hiroaki Sato	199.34	18	62.30	12	137.04
14	Ryuju Hino	198.98	12	69.63	14	129.35
15	Jun Suzuki	198.27	13	69.18	15	129.09
16	Kazuki Kushida	185.16	14	65.31	17	119.85
17	Sena Miyake	185.15	17	64.16	16	120.99
18	Keiichiro Sasahara	177.92	20	60.94	18	116.98
19	Kento Kobayashi	173.53	22	59.76	19	113.77
20	Koshin Yamada	171.05	21	60.13	20	110.92
21	Junya Watanabe	170.88	15	64.93	22	105.95
22	Yoji Nakano	164.54	19	61.77	23	102.77
23	Tsunehito Karakawa	163.02	23	56.05	21	106.97
24	Kousuke Nakano	150.32	24	55.84	24	94.48
Did not advance to free skating
25	Taichi Honda		25	55.56	—	
26	Ryoma Kobayashi		26	55.09	—	
27	Junsuke Tokikuni		27	53.41	—	
28	Reo Ishizuka		28	52.83	—	
29	Hidetsugu Kamata		29	51.10	—	

=== Ladies ===
Rank	Name	Total points	SP		FS	
1	Kaori Sakamoto	228.01	2	75.65	2	152.36
2	Rika Kihira	223.76	5	68.75	1	155.01
3	Satoko Miyahara	223.34	1	76.76	4	146.58
4	Mai Mihara	220.80	3	72.88	3	147.92
5	Wakaba Higuchi	197.63	4	72.63	7	125.00
6	Mako Yamashita	197.14	9	62.94	5	134.20
7	Yuhana Yokoi	196.37	6	66.27	6	130.10
8	Ayaka Hosoda	185.74	10	61.41	8	124.33
9	Yuna Shiraiwa	183.16	12	59.99	9	123.17
10	Tomoe Kawabata	183.11	7	64.66	10	118.45
11	Akari Matsubara	175.69	13	59.27	11	116.42
12	Wakana Nagawana	175.40	11	60.14	12	115.26
13	Nana Araki	170.07	16	56.32	13	113.75
14	Yuna Aoki	169.28	8	63.72	17	105.56
15	Marin Honda	164.23	18	52.75	15	111.48
16	Hina Takeno	163.39	14	58.14	18	105.25
17	Rika Hongo	163.18	17	55.93	16	107.25
18	Rinka Watanabe	161.99	23	50.47	14	111.52
19	Miyabi Oba	157.79	15	57.08	20	100.71
20	Saki Miyake	154.66	20	51.41	19	103.25
21	Hiyori Tokura	149.28	19	51.98	21	97.30
22	Miyu Nakashio	147.46	22	50.86	22	96.60
23	Ayumi Kagotani	141.11	21	51.09	23	90.02
24	Yuka Nagai	128.47	24	49.59	24	78.88
Did not advance to free skating
25	Sui Takeuchi		25	47.79	—	
26	Hinano Isobe		26	47.69	—	
27	Ibuki Sato		27	46.75	—	
28	Rin Nitaya		28	44.81	—	
29	Riona Kato		29	41.99	—	

=== Pairs ===
Rank	Name	Total points	SP		FS	
1	Miu Suzaki / Ryuichi Kihara	157.70	1	59.03	1	98.67
2	Riku Miura / Shoya Ichihashi	withdrew	2	49.70	withdrew	

=== Ice dance ===
Rank	Name	Total points	RD		FS	
1	Misato Komatsubara / Tim Koleto	152.60	1	52.21	1	100.39
2	Kiria Hirayama / Axel Lamasse	121.04	3	43.49	2	77.55
3	Mio Iida / Kenta Ishibashi	119.30	2	43.67	3	75.63

== Japan Junior Figure Skating Championships ==
The 2018–19 Junior Championships took place on November 23–25, 2018 in Fukuoka.

=== Men ===
Rank	Name	Total points	SP		FS	
1	Tatsuya Tsuboi	222.79	2	78.23	2	144.56
2	Shun Sato	222.30	6	66.01	1	156.29
3	Koshiro Shimada	210.03	1	82.35	5	127.68
4	Yuto Kishina	198.84	3	74.26	6	124.58
5	Yuma Kagiyama	197.60	10	60.71	3	136.89
6	Sena Miyake	197.02	4	72.73	7	124.29
7	Mitsuki Sumoto	192.88	5	69.89	8	122.99
8	Kao Miura	190.88	8	62.20	4	128.68
9	Lucas Tsuyoshi Honda	174.63	7	63.34	9	111.29
10	Takeru Amine Kataise	163.56	9	61.87	10	101.69
11	Takumi Sugiyama	152.33	11	53.78	13	98.55
12	Keisuke Kadowaki	150.47	12	53.71	15	96.76
13	Haruya Sasaki	149.56	14	50.68	12	98.88
14	Shunsuke Nakamura	149.45	16	48.97	11	100.48
15	Yuga Furusho	145.45	20	47.77	14	97.68
16	Kosho Oshima	140.92	19	48.08	17	92.84
17	Yuki Kunikata	140.34	23	47.20	16	93.14
18	Sora Tarumi	138.87	18	48.43	19	90.44
19	Syunya Matsuoka	138.87	17	48.95	20	89.92
20	Sumitada Moriguchi	138.67	24	47.05	18	91.62
21	Nozomu Yoshioka	137.23	21	47.43	21	89.80
22	Keita Kuninaka	134.40	15	49.84	22	84.56
23	Kimichika Wada	130.83	13	51.77	24	79.06
24	Minato Shiga	128.01	22	47.40	23	80.61
Did not advance to free skating
25	Ryoga Morimoto		25	47.05		
26	Rei Suzuki		26	43.67		
27	Syun Kobayashi		27	43.50		
28	Ryusei Kikuchi		28	43.42		
29	Tatuma Furuya		29	39.80		
30	Shuntaro Asaga		30	25.81		

=== Ladies ===
Rank	Name	Total points	SP		FS	
1	Yuhana Yokoi	181.84	1	61.86	1	119.98
2	Nana Araki	170.90	2	58.51	2	112.39
3	Tomoe Kawabata	158.16	12	52.05	3	106.11
4	Rinka Watanabe	157.70	6	54.16	5	103.54
5	Yuna Aoki	157.34	4	55.23	6	102.11
6	Wakana Naganawa	154.94	15	50.31	4	104.63
7	Moa Iwano	153.60	3	56.31	9	97.29
8	Rino Matsuike	150.62	7	53.62	10	97.00
9	Rion Sumiyoshi	150.38	10	52.81	8	97.57
10	Rika Tejima	147.57	13	51.79	11	95.78
11	Rino Kasakake	147.31	17	48.81	7	98.50
12	Miyu Honda	147.17	9	53.29	14	93.88
13	Serina Okada	146.29	11	52.05	13	94.24
14	Chisato Uramatsu	145.00	5	54.49	16	90.51
15	Shiika Yoshioka	143.66	16	50.10	15	93.56
16	Riko Takino	140.61	14	50.83	17	89.78
17	Sara Honda	139.61	23	44.45	12	95.16
18	Mone Chiba	136.91	8	53.50	19	83.41
19	Yukino Fuji	132.71	19	47.83	18	84.88
20	Rei Yoshimoto	130.15	20	47.34	20	82.81
21	Yuka Chon	127.19	21	45.35	21	81.84
22	Natsu Suzuki	124.44	24	44.16	22	80.28
23	Momoka Hatasaki	120.87	18	47.96	24	72.91
24	Airi Miyamoto	120.78	22	45.14	23	75.64
Did not advance to free skating
25	Hana Horimi		25	43.87		
26	Niina Takeno		26	43.17		
27	Akari Matsuoka		27	43.01		
28	Nonoka Ise		28	42.71		
29	Marin Okamoto		29	42.70		
30	Hinako Katayama		30	39.92		

== International team selections ==
On 25 December 2018, the Japan Skating Federation published its selections for the 2019 World Championships, 2019 Four Continents Championships, 2019 World Junior Championships, and 2019 Winter Universiade.

=== World Championships ===
The 2019 World Championships were held on March 18–24, 2019 in Saitama, Japan.

	Men	Ladies	Pairs	Ice dancing
1	Shoma Uno	Kaori Sakamoto	Miu Suzaki / Ryuichi Kihara	Misato Komatsubara / Tim Koleto
2	Keiji Tanaka	Rika Kihira		
3	Yuzuru Hanyu	Satoko Miyahara		
1st alt.	Kazuki Tomono	Mai Mihara		
2nd alt.	Sota Yamamoto	Wakaba Higuchi		
3rd alt.	Koshiro Shimada	Mako Yamashita		

=== Four Continents Championships ===
The 2019 Four Continents Championships were held on February 7–10, 2019 in Anaheim, United States.

	Men	Ladies	Pairs	Ice dancing
1	Shoma Uno	Kaori Sakamoto	Miu Suzaki / Ryuichi Kihara	Misato Komatsubara / Tim Koleto
2	Keiji Tanaka	Rika Kihira		
3	Kazuki Tomono	Mai Mihara		
1st alt.	Sota Yamamoto	Wakaba Higuchi		
2nd alt.	Hiroaki Sato	Mako Yamashita		

=== World Junior Championships ===
The 2019 World Junior Championships were held on March 4–10, 2019 in Zagreb, Croatia.

	Men	Ladies	Pairs	Ice dancing
1	Tatsuya Tsuboi	Yuhana Yokoi	Riku Miura / Shoya Ichihashi	
2	Koshiro Shimada	Tomoe Kawabata		
3		Yuna Shiraiwa		
1st alt.	Yuma Kagiyama	Nana Araki		
2nd alt.	Shun Sato	Wakana Naganawa		
3rd alt.		Yuna Aoki		

=== Winter Universiade ===
The 2019 Winter Universiade were held on March 4–9, 2019 in Krasnoyarsk, Russia.

	Men	Ladies
1	Kazuki Tomono	Mai Mihara
2	Shu Nakamura	Hina Takeno
1st alt.	Jun Suzuki	Rika Hongo
2nd alt.	Kazuki Kushida	Miyabi Oba
