= Rikako Fukase =

Japanese ice dancer and synchro skater

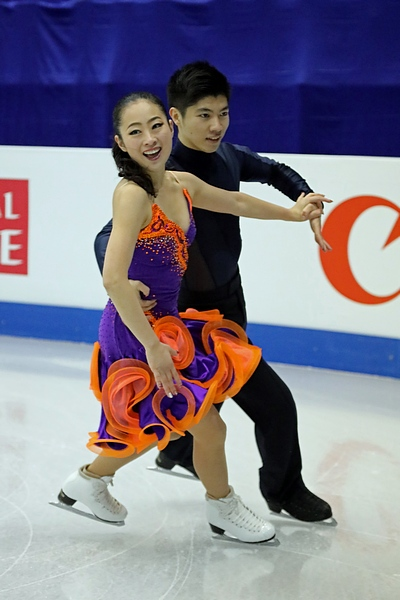
- Fukase/Tateno at the 2018 Four Continents Championships

Personal information
- Native name: 深瀬 理香子
- Born: August 12, 1997 (age 29) Kawagoe, Saitama, Japan
- Height: 1.62 m (5 ft 4 in)

Figure skating career
- Country: Japan; Canada (synchro, 2022-2026)
- Began skating: 2006

Rikako Fukase (Japanese: 深瀬 理香子; born August 12, 1997) is a Japanese and Canadian figure and synchro skater. She formerly represented Japan in ice dancing, skating with Aru Tateno and Eichu Cho (Oliver Zhang) at a total of four ISU Championships. With Cho, she is the 2020 NHK Trophy silver medalist and a two-time Japanese national medalist.

Fukase has also competed in synchronized skating. In the 2022–23 season, she skated for Canada as a member of Les Suprêmes, winning gold at the 2023 ISU World Synchronized Skating Championships.

== Career ==
=== Partnership with Tateno ===
In 2014, Fukase began competing in partnership with Aru Tateno, representing Japan in ice dancing. In their first season together, they competed domestically but made no international appearances. Their international debut came in September 2015, at the ISU Junior Grand Prix in Austria. They placed 19th at the 2016 World Junior Championships in Debrecen, Hungary. The following season, they finished 13th at the 2017 World Junior Championships in Taipei, Taiwan.

Fukase/Tateno moved up to seniors for their fourth season together. They took bronze at the 2017–18 Japan Championships and placed 11th at the 2018 Four Continents Championships in Taipei.

Fukase/Tateno were coached by Romain Haguenauer, Patrice Lauzon, Pascal Denis, and Marie-France Dubreuil in Montreal, Quebec, Canada.

=== Partnership with Cho (Zhang) ===
Fukase continued her career for Japan in partnership with Canadian-born ice dancer Oliver Zhang, who would compete with her as Eichu Cho. During their first season, they took silver at the 2019–20 Japan Championships and placed 13th at the 2020 Four Continents Championships.

The following season was affected by the COVID-19 pandemic, resulting in many event cancellations. Fukase/Cho won silver at the 2020 NHK Trophy and bronze at the 2020–21 Japan Championships.

Fukase/Cho trained mainly in Montreal. Their coaches included Romain Haguenauer, Patrice Lauzon, Marie-France Dubreuil, Pascal Denis, Josée Piché, Benjamin Brisebois, Ginette Cournoyer, Yutaka Higuchi, and Aya Sunayama.

=== Synchronized skating ===
In the 2022–23 season, Fukase competed as a member of Canada's Les Suprêmes. She began training with the team in May 2022. They won gold at the 2023 ISU World Synchronized Skating Championships.

== Programs ==
=== With Cho (Zhang) ===
Season	Rhythm dance	Free dance	Exhibition
2020–2021	Someone in the Crowd; Quickstep, Waltz: Another Day of Sun; Planetarium (from La La Land) by Justin Hurwitz, Benj Pasek, Justin Paul choreo. by Pascal Denis	My Funny Valentine by Lorenz Hart, Richard Rodgers; Feeling Good by Leslie Bricusse performed by Michael Bublé	Booty Swing by Parov Stelar
2019–2020	Someone in the Crowd; Quickstep, Waltz: Another Day of Sun; Planetarium (from La La Land) by Justin Hurwitz, Benj Pasek, Justin Paul choreo. by Pascal Denis	The Huns Attack by Jerry Goldsmith; Reflection by David Zippel, Matthew Wilder (from Mulan) choreo. by Pascal Denis	

=== With Tateno ===
Season	Short dance	Free dance	Exhibition
2017–2018	Cha Cha: Senorita Bonita by Martin Strathausen; Mambo: Tequila by Chuck Rio both performed by Tape Five; Mambo: Qué rico el mambo performed by Pérez Prado	Hello, Dolly!; The International Hello Dolly by Jerry Herman	
2016–2017	Blues: Petite Fleur by Sidney Bechet; Swing: Opus One	The King and I by Rodgers and Hammerstein	
2015–2016	Waltz: Aquarellen; Polka: Feuerfest! by Josef Strauss	Dream a Little Dream of Me; Puttin' On the Ritz	Sing, Sing, Sing by Louis Prima

== Competitive highlights ==
GP: Grand Prix; CS: Challenger Series; JGP: Junior Grand Prix

=== Synchro with Les Suprêmes for Canada ===
International
Event	22–23	23–24	24–25	25–26
World Championships	1st	1st	4th	1st
CS Budapest Cup		1st		
CS Dresden Cup			2nd	
CS International Classic			1st	
CS Leon Lurje Trophy	3rd			
CS Lumiere Cup				1st
CS Marie Lundmark Trophy		2nd		1st
CS Spring Cup	1st			
Budapest Cup			1st	
Riga Amber Cup				1st
National
Canadian Championships	3rd	1st	1st	1st
CS = Challenger Series; C = Cancelled

=== Ice dancing with Cho (Zhang) for Japan ===
International
Event	2019–20	2020–21	2021–22
Four Continents	13th		
GP NHK Trophy		2nd	
Mentor Toruń Cup	9th		
National
Japan Champ.	2nd	3rd	WD
Eastern Sect.	1st		
WD = Withdrew

=== Ice dancing with Tateno for Japan ===
International
Event	14–15	15–16	16–17	17–18
Four Continents				11th
CS Lombardia				11th
Toruń Cup				5th
International: Junior
Junior Worlds		19th	13th	
JGP Austria		11th		
JGP Estonia			10th	
JGP Japan			6th	
Toruń Cup		3rd	7th	
National
Japan				3rd
Japan Junior	1st	1st	1st	
Eastern Sect.	1st J	1st J	1st J	1st
J = Junior level

=== Ladies' singles ===
National
Event	11–12	12–13	13–14	14–15
Japan Eastern Sectional	26th J			
Kanto Block 2 Regional	11th J	24th J	21st J	6th
J = Junior level
