= Oliver Zhang =

Canadian-Japanese ice dancer

Personal information
- Other names: Eichu Cho (張睿中)
- Born: November 21, 1997 (age 28) Montreal, Quebec, Canada
- Home town: Montreal, Canada
- Height: 1.72 m (5 ft 7 1/2 in)

Figure skating career
- Country: Japan
- Partner: Rikako Fukase
- Coach: Romain Haguenauer; Patrice Lauzon; Marie-France Dubreuil; Pascal Denis; Josée Piché; Benjamin Brisebois; Ginette Cournoyer
- Began skating: 2002
- Retired: August 27, 2022

Oliver Zhang or Eichu Cho (Japanese: 張睿中; born November 21, 1997) is a Canadian-Japanese ice dancer. With his skating partner, Rikako Fukase, he is the 2020 NHK Trophy silver medalist and a two-time Japanese national medalist. They competed in the final segment at the 2020 Four Continents Championships.

== Programs ==
=== With Fukase ===
Season	Rhythm dance	Free dance	Exhibition
2020–2021	Someone in the Crowd; Quickstep, Waltz: Another Day of Sun; Planetarium (from La La Land) by Justin Hurwitz, Benj Pasek, Justin Paul choreo. by Pascal Denis	My Funny Valentine by Lorenz Hart, Richard Rodgers; Feeling Good by Leslie Bricusse performed by Michael Bublé	Booty Swing by Parov Stelar
2019–2020	Someone in the Crowd; Quickstep, Waltz: Another Day of Sun; Planetarium (from La La Land) by Justin Hurwitz, Benj Pasek, Justin Paul choreo. by Pascal Denis	The Huns Attack by Jerry Goldsmith; Reflection by David Zippel, Matthew Wilder (from Mulan) choreo. by Pascal Denis	

=== With Roy ===
Season	Short dance	Free dance
2017–2018	Cha Cha Cha by Mo' Horizons; Amado Mio (from Gilda) by Doris Fisher, Allan Roberts performed by Cinema Serenade Ensemble; Samba Sim by Jerry Martin choreo. by Francis Lafrenière, Bruno Yvars	Assassin's Tango (from Mr. & Mrs. Smith) by John Powell; Tanguera by Sexteto Mayor choreo. by Anjelika Krylova

== Competitive highlights ==
GP: Grand Prix; CS: Challenger Series

=== With Fukase ===
International
Event	19–20	20–21	21–22
Four Continents	13th		
GP NHK Trophy		2nd	
Mentor Torun Cup	9th		
National
Japan Champ.	2nd	3rd	WD
Eastern Sect.	1st		

=== With Roy ===
National
Event	2017–18
Canadian Champ.	10th J
SC Challenge	9th J
Quebec Sect.	5th J
Levels: J = Junior
