= 2020 Cup of China =

Figure skating competition

- Type: Grand Prix
- Date: November 6 – 8
- Season: 2020–21
- Location: Chongqing
- Host: Chinese Skating Association
- Venue: Chongqing Huaxi Culture and Sports Center

Champions
- Men's singles: (China) Jin Boyang
- Ladies' singles: (China) Chen Hongyi
- Pairs: (China) Peng Cheng / Jin Yang
- Ice dance: (China) Wang Shiyue / Liu Xinyu
- Previous: 2019 Cup of China
- Next: 2021 Cup of China
- Previous Grand Prix: 2020 Skate America
- Next Grand Prix: 2020 Rostelecom Cup

The 2020 SHISEIDO Cup of China was the third event in the 2020–21 ISU Grand Prix of Figure Skating, a senior-level international invitational competition series. It was held at the Chongqing Huaxi Culture and Sports Center in Chongqing, China on November 6–8. Medals were awarded in the disciplines of men's singles, ladies' singles, pair skating, and ice dance.

Due to the ongoing COVID-19 pandemic, a large number of modifications were made to the Grand Prix structure. The competitors consisted only of skaters from the home country, skaters already training in the host nation, and skaters assigned to that event for geographic reasons. The Chinese Skating Association was the only federation to host a wholly domestic Grand Prix event.

On July 9, 2020, the General Administration of Sport of China announced that no international sporting events would be held in China in 2020, except for 2022 Winter Olympics test events. The ISU announced on July 13 that the Cup of China would be held as scheduled in Chongqing, due to its connection to the Beijing test event, the Grand Prix Final (later cancelled). On October 29, 2020, the Chinese Skating Association announced that the event would be held with no audience present for health reasons.

== Entries ==
The International Skating Union announced the preliminary assignments on October 1, 2020.

| Country | Men | Women | Pairs | Ice dance |
|---|---|---|---|---|
| China | Chen Yudong; Jin Boyang; Peng Zhiming; Xu Juwen; Yan Han; Zhang He | Chen Hongyi; Jin Minzhi; Angel Li; Zhang Siyang; Zheng Lu | Peng Cheng / Jin Yang; Wang Yuchen / Huang Yihang; Zhu Daizifei / Liu Yuhang | Chen Hong / Sun Zhuoming; Guo Yuzhu / Zhao Pengkun; Lin Yufei / Gao Zijian; Ning Wanqi / Wang Chao; Wang Shiyue / Liu Xinyu |

=== Changes to preliminary assignments ===
| Discipline | Withdrew | | Added | | Notes | Ref. |
| Discipline | Date | Skater(s) | Date | Skater(s) | Notes | Ref. |
|---|---|---|---|---|---|---|
| Men | —N/a | | October 16 | (China) Peng Zhiming | | |
| Men | —N/a | | October 16 | (China) Xu Juwen | | |
| Women | —N/a | | October 16 | (China) Jin Minzhi | | |
| Women | —N/a | | October 16 | (China) Angel Li | | |
| Women | —N/a | | October 16 | (China) Zhang Siyang | | |
| Women | —N/a | | October 16 | (China) Zheng Lu | | |
| Ice dance | —N/a | | October 16 | (China) Lin Yufei / Gao Zijian | | |
| Pairs | October 29 | (China) Sui Wenjing / Han Cong | October 29 | (China) Zhu Daizifei / Liu Yuhang | Recovery from surgery (Han) | |
| Pairs | October 29 | (China) Tang Feiyao / Yang Yongchao | —N/a | | | |

== Results ==
=== Men ===
| Rank | Name | Nation | Total points | SP | | FS | |
|---|---|---|---|---|---|---|---|
| 1 | Jin Boyang | China | 290.89 | 1 | 103.94 | 1 | 186.95 |
| 2 | Yan Han | China | 264.81 | 2 | 92.56 | 2 | 172.25 |
| 3 | Chen Yudong | China | 226.21 | 3 | 75.74 | 3 | 150.47 |
| 4 | Zhang He | China | 209.74 | 4 | 69.68 | 4 | 140.06 |
| 5 | Peng Zhiming | China | 196.28 | 5 | 69.16 | 5 | 127.12 |
| 6 | Xu Juwen | China | 178.00 | 6 | 61.96 | 6 | 116.04 |

=== Women ===
| Rank | Name | Nation | Total points | SP | | FS | |
|---|---|---|---|---|---|---|---|
| 1 | Chen Hongyi | China | 186.53 | 1 | 64.63 | 1 | 121.90 |
| 2 | Li Anqi | China | 148.33 | 2 | 49.94 | 2 | 98.39 |
| 3 | Jin Minzhi | China | 135.43 | 3 | 47.75 | 4 | 87.68 |
| 4 | Zhang Siyang | China | 128.20 | 4 | 39.80 | 3 | 88.40 |
| 5 | Zheng Lu | China | 86.48 | 5 | 29.84 | 5 | 56.64 |

=== Pairs ===
| Rank | Name | Nation | Total points | SP | | FS | |
|---|---|---|---|---|---|---|---|
| 1 | Peng Cheng / Jin Yang | China | 223.90 | 1 | 75.62 | 1 | 148.28 |
| 2 | Wang Yuchen / Huang Yihang | China | 175.40 | 2 | 63.56 | 2 | 111.84 |
| 3 | Zhu Daizifei / Liu Yuhang | China | 140.37 | 3 | 54.37 | 3 | 86.00 |

=== Ice dance ===
| Rank | Name | Nation | Total points | RD | | FD | |
|---|---|---|---|---|---|---|---|
| 1 | Wang Shiyue / Liu Xinyu | China | 206.84 | 1 | 84.23 | 1 | 122.61 |
| 2 | Chen Hong / Sun Zhuoming | China | 192.26 | 2 | 76.57 | 2 | 115.69 |
| 3 | Ning Wanqi / Wang Chao | China | 171.90 | 3 | 69.07 | 3 | 102.83 |
| 4 | Guo Yuzhu / Zhao Pengkun | China | 162.36 | 4 | 65.01 | 4 | 97.35 |
| 5 | Lin Yufei / Gao Zijian | China | 142.33 | 5 | 56.80 | 5 | 85.53 |
