= Chen Hongyi =

Chinese figure skater

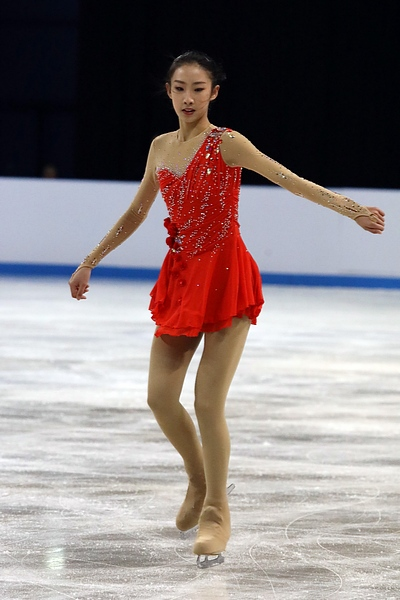
- Chen Hongyi at the 2018 World Junior Figure Skating Championships

Personal information
- Native name: 陈虹伊 (Chinese)
- Born: September 19, 2002 (age 23) Beijing, China
- Height: 1.73 m (5 ft 8 in)

Figure skating career
- Country: China
- Coach: Li Chengjiang
- Skating club: Beijing New Century Star
- Began skating: 2008

Chen Hongyi (simplified Chinese: 陈虹伊; traditional Chinese: 陳虹伊; pinyin: Chén Hóngyī; born September 19, 2002) is a Chinese figure skater. She is the 2020 Cup of China champion, a three-time Chinese national medalist (2018–20), and has skated in the final segment at five ISU Championships.

== Career ==
=== Early years ===
Chen began learning to skate in 2008.

=== 2017–2018 season ===
Chen's ISU Junior Grand Prix (JGP) debut came in September 2017, in Zagreb, Croatia, where she placed sixteenth. The following month, she finished tenth at a JGP event in Gdańsk, Poland. In December, she stepped onto her first senior national podium, taking bronze at the 2018 Chinese Championships. She qualified to the free skate and finished eighteenth overall at the 2018 World Junior Championships in Sofia, Bulgaria.

=== 2018–2019 season ===
Making her senior international debut, Chen placed sixth at the 2018 CS Asian Open Figure Skating Trophy in early August. She placed fourteenth at the 2019 Four Continents Championships. She placed nineteenth at the 2019 World Junior Championships in early March, and then made her senior World Championship debut, placing nineteenth there as well.

=== 2019–2020 season ===
Chen made her Grand Prix debut, placing ninth at the 2019 Cup of China and eighth at the 2019 Rostelecom Cup. After taking the silver medal at the Chinese championships, she placed eleventh at the 2020 Four Continents Championships. She was assigned to compete at the 2020 World Championships, but these were cancelled as a result of the coronavirus pandemic.

=== 2020–2021 season ===
With the pandemic continuing to affect international travel, the ISU assigned the Grand Prix based largely on geography. Chen was assigned to the 2020 Cup of China, which she won over the other Chinese ladies present by almost 40 points. Competing at the 2021 World Championships in Stockholm, Chen placed twenty-first. Her result qualified a berth for China at its home Winter Olympics in Beijing.

=== 2021–2022 season ===
Struggling with a back injury and a sprained ankle, Chen had to withdraw from the 2021 CS Asian Open Trophy and the 2021 Gran Premio d'Italia.

Ultimately, the Chinese Olympic Committee awarded the sole Olympic women's singles spot to Zhu Yi. This decision sparked criticism from Chinese figure skating fans as many of them believed Chen to be a better choice.

Following the decision, Chen posted on her Weibo that although she felt regretful over having missed out on being selected to go to the Olympics, she would continue to work hard.

=== 2022–2023 season ===
Chen's only major competition for the season was the 2023 Chinese Championships, where she placed sixth.

=== 2023–2024 season ===
Returning to international competition for the first time in two years, Chen competed at the 2023 Shanghai Trophy, where she finished sixth. She went on to compete at the 2023 Cup of China, where she placed eighth.

At the 2024 Chinese Championships, Chen placed tenth. Despite this, she was selected to compete at the 2024 Four Continents Championships in Shanghai, where she would finish thirteenth.

Chen would then end the season by finishing fourteenth at the 2024 National Winter Games.

=== 2024–2025 season ===
Chen began the season by competing at the 2024 Shanghai Trophy, where she placed sixth. She subsequently placed twelfth at the 2024 Cup of China. One week later, Chen finished twelfth at the 2025 Chinese Championships.

In February, Chen competed at the 2025 Four Continents Championships in Seoul, South Korea, where she finished seventeenth.

=== 2025–2026 season ===
At the 2026 Chinese Championships, Chen finished in eleventh place.

== Programs ==
Season	Short program	Free skating	Exhibition
2025–2026	Fix You by Coldplay performed by Tommee Profitt, Stanaj, & Staarz choreo. by Misha Ge	Burnt Norton (Interlude); Salvatore by Lana Del Rey & Dramatic Violin	
2024–2025	Experience by Ludovico Einaudi choreo. by Lori Nichol	Half Moon Serenade by Hacken Lee choreo. by Misha Ge	Only for Love (from The Banquet) by Tan Dun, Lang Lang, & Jane Zhang
2023–2024	Experience by Ludovico Einaudi choreo. by Lori Nichol	Half Moon Serenade by Hacken Lee choreo. by Misha Ge	Chicago; Roxie performed by Renée Zellweger; Nowadays / Hot Honey Rag performed by Renée Zellweger & Catherine Zeta-Jones; Orchid Pavilion by Jay Chou; 赤伶 (Chilling) by Li Yugang
2022–2023	Experience by Ludovico Einaudi choreo. by Lori Nichol	Jasmine Flower by Lang Lang choreo. by Lori Nichol	
2021–2022	Experience by Ludovico Einaudi choreo. by Lori Nichol	Jasmine Flower by Lang Lang choreo. by Lori Nichol	
2020–2021	Love Theme (from Cinema Paradiso) by Ennio Morricone chore. by Lori Nichol	I Have the Strength to Fly by Xiaoduo Cheng choreo. by Lori Nichol	Dance For Me Wallis (from W.E.) by Abel Korzeniowski choreo. by Misha Ge; Notte stellata (The Swan) by Tony Renis, Camille Saint-Saëns performed by Il Volo choreo. by Misha Ge
2019–2020	Orchestral Suite in D Major "Air" by Johann Sebastian Bach choreo. by Misha Ge	Dance For Me Wallis (from W.E.) by Abel Korzeniowski choreo. by Misha Ge	
2018–2019	Notte stellata (The Swan) by Tony Renis, Camille Saint-Saëns performed by Il Volo choreo. by Misha Ge	Baghdad by Jesse Cook choreo. by Misha Ge	
2017–2018	The Arena performed by Lindsey Stirling	Why Are The Flowers So Red	

== Competitive highlights ==
- GP – Event of the ISU Grand Prix Series
- JGP – Event of the ISU Junior Grand Prix Series
- CS – Event of the ISU Challenger Series
- TBD – Assigned
- WD – Withdrew from competition
- C – Event was cancelled

Competition placements at senior level
Season	2016–17	2017–18	2018–19	2019–20	2020–21	2021–22	2022–23	2023–24	2024–25	2025-26
World Championships			19th	C	21st					
Four Continents Championships			14th	11th				13th	17th	
Chinese Championships	4th	3rd	3rd	2nd	C	C	6th	10th	12th	11th
GP Cup of China				9th	1st	C		8th	12th	
GP Italy						WD				
GP Rostelecom Cup				8th						
CS Alpen Trophy			10th							
CS Asian Open Trophy			6th			WD				
CS Golden Spin of Zagreb			7th							
National Winter Games								14th		
Shanghai Trophy				5th				6th	6th	

Competition placements at junior level
Season	2017–18	2018–19
World Junior Championships	18th	19th
JGP Austria		8th
JGP Croatia	16th	
JGP Poland	10th	

== Detailed results ==
ISU personal best scores in the +5/-5 GOE System
Segment	Type	Score	Event
Total	**TSS**	**175.77**	2019 Rostelecom Cup
Short program	**TSS**	**62.57**	2023 Cup of China
Short program	TES	35.32	2023 Cup of China
Short program	PCS	28.15	2021 World Championships
Free skating	**TSS**	**118.60**	2019 Rostelecom Cup
Free skating	TES	60.83	2019 Rostelecom Cup
Free skating	PCS	57.77	2019 Rostelecom Cup

Current personal best scores are highlighted in bold.

=== Senior results ===
**2025–26 season**
Date	Event	SP	FS	Total
December 25–28, 2025	2026 Chinese Championships	10; 54.45	11; 108.91	11; 163.36
**2024–25 season**
Date	Event	SP	FS	Total
February 19–23, 2025	2025 Four Continents Championships	16; 47.57	17; 91.13	17; 138.70
November 28 – December 1, 2024	2025 Chinese Championships	10; 53.07	10; 106.97	12; 160.04
November 22–24, 2024	2024 Cup of China	12; 45.81	11; 93.76	12; 139.57
October 3–5, 2024	2024 Shanghai Trophy	6; 54.49	6; 97.64	6; 152.13
**2023–24 season**
Date	Event	SP	FS	Total
February 24–26, 2024	2024 National Winter Games	12; 49.89	14; 96.50	14; 146.39
February 1–4, 2024	2024 Four Continents Championships	13; 55.97	14; 97.99	13; 153.96
December 22–24, 2023	2024 Chinese Championships	9; 51.44	10; 95.27	10; 146.71
November 10–12, 2023	2023 Cup of China	5; 62.57	8; 106.09	8; 168.66
October 3–5, 2023	2023 Shanghai Trophy	6; 49.35	6; 88.60	6; 137.95
**2022–23 season**
Date	Event	SP	FS	Total
January 11–13, 2023	2023 Chinese Championships	2; 59.59	6; 100.00	6; 159.59
**2020–21 season**
Date	Event	SP	FS	Total
March 22–28, 2021	2021 World Championships	22; 58.81	21; 103.98	21; 162.79
November 6–8, 2020	2020 Cup of China	1; 64.63	1; 121.90	1; 186.53
**2019–20 season**
Date	Event	SP	FS	Total
February 4–9, 2020	2020 Four Continents Championships	11; 56.81	11; 110.45	11; 167.26
November 15–17, 2019	2019 Rostelecom Cup	1; 57.17	1; **118.60**	1; **175.77**
November 8–10, 2019	2019 Cup of China	9; 49.44	7; 105.68	8; 155.12
October 3–5, 2019	2020 Shanghai Trophy	4; 53.85	5; 92.80	5; 146.65
September 14–16, 2019	2020 Chinese Championships	2; 61.97	3; 114.29	2; 176.26
**2018–19 season**
Date	Event	SP	FS	Total
March 18–24, 2019	2019 World Championships	15; 58.53	19; 99.06	19; 157.59
February 7–10, 2019	2019 Four Continents Championships	13; 54.44	15; 96.06	14; 150.50
December 29–30, 2018	2019 Chinese Championships	3; 54.62	3; 105.59	3; 160.21
December 5–8, 2018	2018 CS Golden Spin of Zagreb	8; 56.81	7; 108.74	7; 165.55
November 11–18, 2018	2018 CS Alpen Trophy	14; 54.82	10; 89.08	10; 143.90
August 1–5, 2018	2018 CS Asian Open Trophy	5; 53.06	6; 87.82	6; 140.88
**2017–18 season**
Date	Event	SP	FS	Total
December 23–24, 2017	2018 Chinese Championships	3; 60.97	3; 115.62	3; 176.59
**2016–17 season**
Date	Event	SP	FS	Total
December 23–24, 2016	2017 Chinese Championships	4; 42.82	8; 78.04	4; 120.86

=== Junior results ===
**2018–19 season**
Date	Event	SP	FS	Total
March 4–10, 2019	2019 World Junior Championships	13; 53.24	19; 88.25	19; 141.49
August 30 – September 1, 2018	2018 JGP Austria	5; 54.54	9; 92.28	8; 146.82
**2018–19 season**
Date	Event	SP	FS	Total
March 5–11, 2018	2018 World Junior Championships	18; 49.83	18; 91.17	18; 141.00
October 4–7, 2017	2017 JGP Poland	13; 42.61	9; 90.61	10; 133.22
September 27–30, 2017	2017 JGP Croatia	16; 39.48	15; 77.81	16; 117.29
