= Wang Chao (figure skater) =

Chinese ice dancer

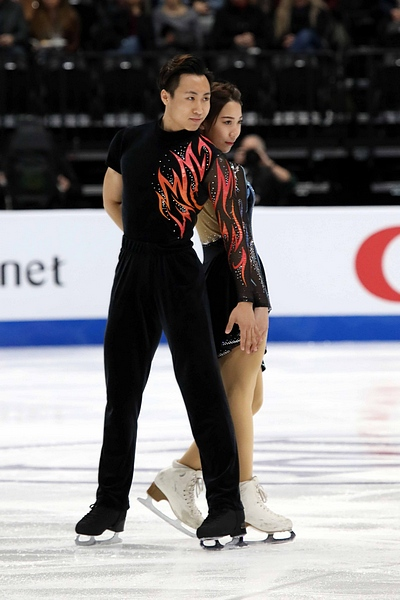
- Ning/Wang at the 2019 Four Continents Championships

Personal information
- Native name: 王超 (Chinese)
- Born: November 2, 1996 (age 29) Qiqihar, China
- Home town: Qiqihar, China
- Height: 1.72 m (5 ft 7 1/2 in)

Figure skating career
- Country: China
- Partner: Ning Wanqi
- Coach: Cao Xianming
- Skating club: Qiqihar Winter Sports Center
- Began skating: 2002

Wang Chao (Chinese: 王超; pinyin: Wáng Chāo; born November 2, 1996) is a Chinese ice dancer. With his skating partner, Ning Wanqi, he is the 2020 Cup of China bronze medalist, a three-time Chinese national bronze medalist (2018–20), and competed in the final segment at two Four Continents Championships (2019, 2020).

== Programs ==
=== With Ning ===
Season	Rhythm dance	Free dance
2020–2021	Foxtrot: A Spoonful of Sugar; Quickstep: A Spoonful of Sugar; Waltz: Chim Chim Cher-ee; Polka: Supercalifragilisticexpialidocious (from Mary Poppins) by Richard M. Sherman, Robert B. Sherman choreo. by Pascal Denis	Ouverture; Penser l'impossible; Je dors sur des roses (from Mozart, l'opéra rock) performed by Mikelangelo Loconte choreo. by Pascal Denis
2019–2020	Foxtrot: A Spoonful of Sugar; Quickstep: A Spoonful of Sugar; Waltz: Chim Chim Cher-ee; Polka: Supercalifragilisticexpialidocious (from Mary Poppins) by Richard M. Sherman, Robert B. Sherman choreo. by Pascal Denis	Ouverture; Penser l'impossible; Je dors sur des roses (from Mozart, l'opéra rock) performed by Mikelangelo Loconte choreo. by Pascal Denis
2018–2019	Tango: Emigrante (Exilio Del Alma) by Tanghetto choreo. by Shae Zukiwsky	Fire on the Floor by Beth Hart; Bring Me Some Water by Melissa Etheridge choreo. by Shae Zukiwsky
	Short dance	
2017–2018	Cha Cha: Perhaps, Perhaps, Perhaps by Osvaldo Farrés performed by The Pussycat Dolls; Samba: Batucada by DJ Nero choreo. by Cao Xianming	Young Michael (from Monsters University) by Randy Newman; Foxy Fakeout (from Zootopia) by Michael Giacchino choreo. by Cao Xianming

== Competitive highlights ==
GP: Grand Prix; CS: Challenger Series; JGP: Junior Grand Prix

With Ning

International
Event	14–15	15–16	16–17	17–18	18–19	19–20	20–21
Four Continents					11th	12th	
Cup of China							3rd
CS Asian Trophy					5th	6th	
Shanghai Trophy						5th	
Toruń Cup					9th		
International: Junior
Junior Worlds				22nd			
JGP Croatia				10th			
JGP Poland				9th			
Tallinn Trophy				10th			
National
Chinese Champ.	9th	6th		3rd	3rd	3rd	
TBD = Assigned; WD = Withdrew

Men's singles

National
Event	08–09	09–10	10–11	11–12
Chinese Champ.	22nd	16th	17th	20th
