= 2020 NHK Trophy =

- Type: Grand Prix
- Date: November 27 – 29
- Season: 2020–21
- Location: Kadoma, Osaka
- Host: Japan Skating Federation
- Venue: Osaka Prefectural Kadoma Sports Center (Towa Pharmaceutical Ractab Dome)

Champions
- Men's singles: (Japan) Yuma Kagiyama
- Ladies' singles: (Japan) Kaori Sakamoto
- Ice dance: (Japan) Misato Komatsubara / Tim Koleto
- Previous: 2019 NHK Trophy
- Next: 2021 NHK Trophy
- Previous Grand Prix: 2020 Rostelecom Cup

The 2020 NHK Trophy was the sixth event in the 2020–21 ISU Grand Prix of Figure Skating, a senior-level international invitational competition series. It was held at Osaka Prefectural Kadoma Sports Center (Towa Pharmaceutical Ractab Dome) in Osaka, Japan on November 27–29. Medals were awarded in the disciplines of men's singles, ladies' singles, and ice dance.

Due to the ongoing COVID-19 pandemic, a large number of modifications were made to the Grand Prix structure. The competitors consisted only of skaters from the home country, skaters already training in the host nation, and skaters assigned to that event for geographic reasons. As a result, there were no entrants for the pair skating segment of the competition.

== Entries ==
The International Skating Union announced the preliminary assignments on October 1, 2020.

Country	Men	Ladies	Ice dance
Japan	Lucas Tsuyoshi Honda; Yuma Kagiyama; Yuto Kishina; Kao Miura; Sena Miyake; Shun Sato; Mitsuki Sumoto; Keiji Tanaka; Kazuki Tomono; Sōta Yamamoto; Nozomu Yoshioka	Nana Araki; Wakaba Higuchi; Marin Honda; Tomoe Kawabata; Mana Kawabe; Rino Matsuike; Mai Mihara; Kaori Sakamoto; Chisato Uramatsu; Mako Yamashita; Yuhana Yokoi	Rikako Fukase / Eichu Cho; Misato Komatsubara / Tim Koleto; Kana Muramoto / Daisuke Takahashi
South Korea		You Young	

=== Changes to preliminary assignments ===
Discipline	Withdrew		Added		Notes	Ref.
Discipline	Date	Skater(s)	Date	Skater(s)	Notes	Ref.
Ladies	—		October 19	(South Korea) You Young		

== Results ==
=== Men ===
Mitsuki Sumoto withdrew prior to the short program due to a fever.

Rank	Name	Nation	Total points	SP		FS	
1	Yuma Kagiyama	Japan	275.87	1	87.26	1	188.61
2	Kazuki Tomono	Japan	226.62	2	83.27	3	143.69
3	Lucas Tsuyoshi Honda	Japan	217.56	3	79.22	6	138.34
4	Keiji Tanaka	Japan	215.52	4	76.57	5	138.95
5	Shun Sato	Japan	214.75	7	72.04	4	142.71
6	Kao Miura	Japan	210.53	8	66.84	2	143.69
7	Yuto Kishina	Japan	199.34	5	74.44	8	124.90
8	Sōta Yamamoto	Japan	190.19	9	62.38	7	127.81
9	Sena Miyake	Japan	185.50	6	74.34	9	111.16
10	Nozomu Yoshioka	Japan	164.70	10	55.88	10	108.82
WD	Mitsuki Sumoto	Japan	withdrew	withdrew from competition			

=== Ladies ===
Rank	Name	Nation	Total points	SP		FS	
1	Kaori Sakamoto	Japan	229.51	1	75.60	1	153.91
2	Wakaba Higuchi	Japan	200.98	2	69.71	4	131.27
3	Rino Matsuike	Japan	198.97	4	65.74	2	133.23
4	Mai Mihara	Japan	194.73	7	63.41	3	131.32
5	Mako Yamashita	Japan	186.13	3	67.56	7	118.57
6	Mana Kawabe	Japan	185.70	6	63.62	6	122.08
7	You Young	South Korea	181.73	12	55.56	5	126.17
8	Yuhana Yokoi	Japan	176.49	5	65.18	8	111.31
9	Marin Honda	Japan	162.57	9	58.30	11	104.27
10	Tomoe Kawabata	Japan	162.24	8	59.83	12	102.41
11	Nana Araki	Japan	162.15	10	57.45	10	104.70
12	Chisato Uramatsu	Japan	162.14	11	56.45	9	105.69

=== Ice dance ===
Rank	Name	Nation	Total points	RD		FD	
1	Misato Komatsubara / Tim Koleto	Japan	179.05	1	70.76	1	108.29
2	Rikako Fukase / Eichu Cho	Japan	157.89	3	63.46	2	94.43
3	Kana Muramoto / Daisuke Takahashi	Japan	157.25	2	64.15	3	93.10
