= Yuto Kishina =

Japanese figure skater (born 2001)

Personal information
- Native name: 木科 雄登
- Born: October 15, 2001 (age 25) Asakuchi, Japan
- Home town: Asakuchi, Okayama
- Height: 1.69 m (5 ft 6 1/2 in)

Figure skating career
- Country: Japan
- Coach: Mie Hamada; Hiroaki Sato; Satsuki Muramoto
- Skating club: Kansai University
- Began skating: 2007
- Retired: December 20, 2025

Yuto Kishina (born October 15, 2001) is a retired Japanese figure skater. He is the 2020 Bavarian Open bronze medalist. At the Junior level, he is the 2018 JGP Lithuania bronze medalist, 2018 Challenge Cup silver medalist, and 2017 Coupe du Printemps champion.

== Early life ==
Yuto Kishina was born on October 15, 2001, in Asakuchi, Okayama, Japan. He began skating in 2007.

== Career ==
Kishina opened his season in September 2018 at the Junior Grand Prix event in Lithuania, where he earned a bronze medal. He then placed ninth at his second event in Armenia.

Kishina was assigned to compete at the 2020 NHK Trophy, where he finished seventh.

He retired from competitive figure skating in December 2025.

== Programs ==
Season	Short program	Free skating
2025–2026	Give Me Love by Ed Sheeran choreo. by Kana Muramoto	Fix You by Coldplay choreo. by Cathy Reed
2024–2025	Give Me Love by Ed Sheeran choreo. by Kana Muramoto	Introduction and Rondo Capriccioso by Camille Saint-Saëns choreo. by Cathy Reed
2023−2024	Diablo Rojo by Rodrigo y Gabriela choreo. by Cathy Reed	Primavera by Balázs Havasi choreo. by Mihoko Higuchi
2022−2023	Bad by Michael Jackson choreo. by Cathy Reed	Primavera by Balázs Havasi choreo. by Mihoko Higuchi
2021−2022	Bad by Michael Jackson choreo. by Cathy Reed	Violn Sonata No.9 「Kreuter」 by Ludwig van Beethoven choreo. by Cathy Reed
2020−2021	Michelangelo 70 by Astor Piazzolla choreo. by Cathy Reed	Rhapsody in Blue by George Gershwin choreo. by Ernest Martinez
2019−2020	Ameksa by Taalbi Brothers choreo. by Cathy Reed	Interview with the Vampire choreo. by Tom Dickson
2018–2019	Ameksa by Taalbi Brothers choreo. by Cathy Reed	The Untouchables (soundtrack) by Ennio Morricone choreo. by Cathy Reed

== Competitive highlights ==
GP: Grand Prix; JGP: Junior Grand Prix

International
Event	14–15	15–16	16–17	17–18	18–19	19–20	20–21	21–22	22–23	23–24	24–25	25–26
GP NHK Trophy							7th					
Bavarian Open					4th	3rd						
International: Junior
JGP Armenia					9th							
JGP Australia				5th								
JGP Japan			9th									
JGP Latvia				7th								
JGP Lithuania					3rd							
JGP Spain		12th										
Asian Open			6th	4th								
Challenge Cup				2nd								
Printemps			1st									
National
Japan			16th	19th	8th	14th	21st	29th	25th	23rd	20th	22nd
Japan Junior	24th	11th	4th	5th	4th	6th	4th					

== Detailed results ==
- ISU personal bests highlighted in **bold**.

2025–26 season
Date	Event	SP	FS	Total
December 18–21, 2025	2025–26 Japan Championships	23; 66.16	22; 108.66	22; 174.82
2024–25 season
Date	Event	SP	FS	Total
December 19–22, 2024	2024–25 Japan Championships	18; 68.84	21; 122.21	20; 191.05
2023–24 season
Date	Event	SP	FS	Total
December 20–24, 2023	2023–24 Japan Championships	22; 64.52	21; 123.60	23; 188.12
2022–23 season
Date	Event	SP	FS	Total
December 21–25, 2022	2022–23 Japan Championships	25; 58.73	-	25; 58.73
2021–22 season
Date	Event	SP	FS	Total
December 22–26, 2021	2021–22 Japan Championships	29; 45.92	-	29; 45.92

2020–21 season
Date	Event	Level	SP	FS	Total
December 23–27, 2020	2020–21 Japan Championships	Senior	22; 61.38	19; 112.92	21; 174.30
November 27–29, 2020	2020 NHK Trophy	Senior	5; **74.44**	8; 124.90	7; 199.34
November 21–23, 2020	2020–21 Japan Junior Championships	Junior	3; 73.85	5; 127.88	4; 201.73
2019–20 season
Date	Event	Level	SP	FS	Total
February 3–9, 2020	2020 Bavarian Open	Senior	3; 72.08	5; **129.72**	3; **201.80**
December 18–22, 2019	2019–20 Japan Championships	Senior	8; 77.15	18; 121.62	14; 198.77
November 15–17, 2019	2019–20 Japan Junior Championships	Junior	2; 74.29	12; 109.28	6; 183.57
2018–19 season
Date	Event	Level	SP	FS	Total
February 5–10, 2019	2019 Bavarian Open	Senior	7; 59.92	3; 125.96	4; 185.88
December 20–24, 2018	2018–19 Japan Championships	Senior	8; 72.96	7; 141.39	8; 214.35
November 23–25, 2018	2018–19 Japan Junior Championships	Junior	3; 74.26	6; 124.58	4; 198.84
October 10–13, 2018	2018 JGP Armenia	Junior	5; 67.04	9; 108.76	9; 175.80
September 5–9, 2018	2018 JGP Lithuania	Junior	3; 68.98	4; 122.82	3; 191.80
2017–18 season
Date	Event	Level	SP	FS	Total
February 22–25, 2018	2018 Challenge Cup	Junior	2; 54.88	2; 114.47	2; 169.35
December 20–24, 2017	2017–18 Japan Championships	Senior	23; 56.16	18; 117.97	19; 174.13
November 24–26, 2017	2017–18 Japan Junior Championships	Junior	6; 61.35	4; 123.59	5; 184.94
September 6–9, 2017	2017 JGP Latvia	Junior	12; 54.93	7; 111.11	7; 166.04
August 23–26, 2017	2017 JGP Australia	Junior	6; 59.99	4; 122.49	5; 182.48
August 2–5, 2017	2017 Asian Open Trophy	Junior	4; 47.93	4; 98.25	4; 146.18
2016–17 season
Date	Event	Level	SP	FS	Total
March 10–12, 2017	2017 Coupe du Printemps	Junior	1; 61.74	1; 111.06	1; 172.80
December 22–25, 2016	2016–17 Japan Championships	Senior	17; 58.43	15; 117.51	16; 175.94
November 18–20, 2016	2016–17 Japan Junior Championships	Junior	5; 58.76	4; 112.49	4; 181.25
September 8–11, 2016	2016 JGP Japan	Junior	7; 61.67	10; 112.99	9; 174.66
August 4–7, 2016	2016 Asian Open Trophy	Junior	4; 59.55	6; 92.05	6; 151.60
2015–16 season
Date	Event	Level	SP	FS	Total
November 21–23, 2015	2015–16 Japan Junior Championships	Junior	16; 47.98	10; 103.57	11; 151.55
Sept. 20 – Oct. 3, 2015	2015 JGP Spain	Junior	11; 51.25	12; 98.56	12; 149.81
2014–15 season
Date	Event	Level	SP	FS	Total
November 22–24, 2014	2014–15 Japan Junior Championships	Junior	22; 46.38	23; 77.15	24; 123.53
