= Sena Miyake =

Japanese figure skater

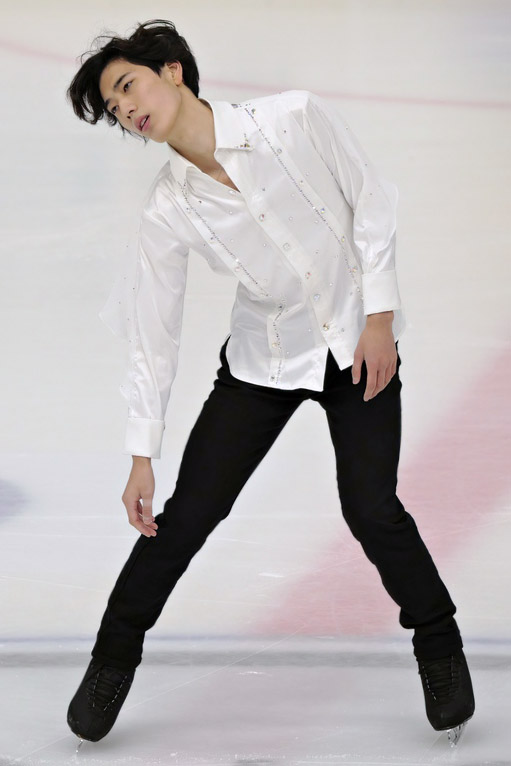
- Miyake at the 2021 Cup of Austria

Personal information
- Native name: 三宅星南
- Born: March 26, 2002 (age 24) Yakage, Okayama, Japan
- Home town: Yakage, Okayama
- Height: 1.74 m (5 ft 8 1/2 in)

Figure skating career
- Country: Japan
- Coach: Utako Nagamitsu; Mamiko Yamai; Kohei Yoshino
- Skating club: Kanku Skate
- Began skating: 2007

Sena Miyake (三宅 星南, Miyake Sena; born 26 March 2002) is a Japanese figure skater. He is the 2019 Coupe du Printemps champion, 2022 Egna Spring Trophy silver medalist, and placed fourth at the 2022 Four Continents Championships.

On the junior level, he is a two-time Japanese national junior medalist, the 2017 Asian Open champion, and competed in the final segment at the 2018 World Junior Championships.

== Personal life ==
Miyake was born on March 26, 2002, in Yakage, Okayama, Japan.

His figure skating idol is Daisuke Takahashi.

== Career ==
=== Early career ===
Miyake finished 8th at the 2011–12 Japan Novice Championships and 7th the following season. He was awarded the silver medal at the 2013–14 Japan Novice Championships and finished 28th at the Japan Junior Championships. He won gold at the 2014–15 Japan Novice Championships and placed 30th at the Japan Junior Championships that same year. He was invited to skate in the gala at the 2014 NHK Trophy and 2015 World Team Trophy.

=== 2015–16 season ===
During the 2015–16 season, Miyake debuted on the ISU Junior Grand Prix (JGP) circuit. After placing 8th at his JGP event in Riga, Latvia, he finished 9th at the Japan Junior Championships.

=== 2016–17 season ===
Miyake started his season at JGP Japan in Yokohama, where he placed 11th. He finished 6th at the 2016–17 Japanese Junior national championships, which qualified him to participate at the senior nationals, where he finished 9th.

=== 2017–18 season ===
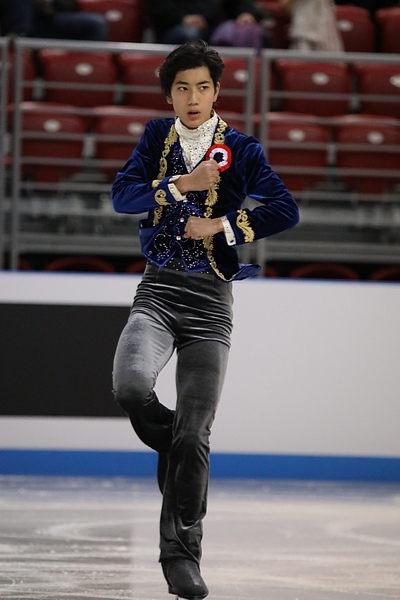
Miyake at the 2018 World Junior Figure Skating Championships

He started his season by winning gold at the 2017 Asian Trophy. His Junior Grand Prix assignment was JGP Austria, where he finished 8th. He won the silver medal at the 2017–18 Japanese Junior championships, 11th on the senior level and was selected to compete at the 2018 World Junior Figure Skating Championships in Sofia, Bulgaria. At the championships, he finished 18th with a total score of 174.66 points.

=== 2018–19 season ===
During the 2018–19 season, he was assigned to JGP Canada along with his compatriot Yuma Kagiyama. He placed 10th at the event in Richmond. At the Japanese Junior championships, he finished within the top six and was, therefore, eligible to compete at the senior championships. He placed 17th at the senior event in Osaka. In March, he won the gold medal at the Coupe du Printemps in Luxembourg.

=== 2019–20 season ===
He was assigned to one Junior Grand Prix assignment in Egna, Italy. After placing sixth in the short program, he came twelfth in the free skate and finished in tenth place overall, achieving all-new personal best scores. At the 2019–20 Japanese Junior championships, he finished in seventh place.

=== 2020–21 season ===
Miyake was assigned to compete at the 2020 NHK Trophy, where he placed ninth. He was tenth at the 2020–21 Japan Championships.

=== 2021–22 season: Senior debut ===
Miyake was seventh to start the season at the 2021 CS Cup of Austria.

At the 2021–22 Japan Championships, Miyake finished in sixth place. He was named as the third alternate for the Japanese Olympic team and sent to compete at the 2022 Four Continents Championships. Miyake finished fourth. He then won the silver medal at the Egna Trophy to conclude his season.

=== 2022–23 season ===
Given two Grand Prix assignments, Miyake began the season by placing eighth at the 2022 Skate America. At the Grand Prix de France, he placed tenth in the short program, but withdrew before the free program due to illness. Miyake then came twelfth at the 2022–23 Japan Championships.

=== 2023–24 season ===
Miyake competed at the 2023–24 Japan Championships, where he placed ninth.

=== 2024–25 season ===
Miyake competed at the 2024–25 Japan Championships, where he finished in sixth place. He was subsequently assigned to compete at the 2025 International Challenge Cup, where he won the gold medal.

=== 2025–26 season ===
At the 2025–26 Japan Championships, Miyake finished the event in seventeenth place.

== Programs ==
Season	Short program	Free skating	Exhibition
2025–2026	In the Garden of Souls by Vas choreo. by Misha Ge	Titanic; Never an Absolution; Hard to Starboar; My Heart Will Go On by James Horner choreo. by Kohei Yoshino	
2024–2025	Maria (from West Side Story) by Leonard Bernstein & Stephen Sondheim performed by Ansel Elgort choreo. by Eiji Iwamoto; LOVE by Sofiane Pamart choreo. by Misha Ge	Titanic; Never an Absolution; Hard to Starboar; My Heart Will Go On by James Horner choreo. by Kohei Yoshino; Pas de deux (from Don Quixote) by Ludwig Minkus choreo. by Eiji Iwamoto	
2023–2024	Maria (from West Side Story) by Leonard Bernstein & Stephen Sondheim performed by Ansel Elgort choreo. by Eiji Iwamoto; Gipsy Kings Medley choreo. by Kohei Yoshino	A Question of Honour (Radio Mix) by Sarah Brightman choreo. by Eiji Iwamoto	
2022–2023	Unchained Melody by Alex North choreo. by Kohei Yoshino	Titanic; Never an Absolution; Hard to Starboar; My Heart Will Go On by James Horner choreo. by Kohei Yoshino	
2021–2022	Unchained Melody by Alex North choreo. by Kohei Yoshino	Swan Lake by Pyotr Ilyich Tchaikovsky choreo. by Kenji Miyamoto	
2020–2021	Romeo and Juliet choreo. by Kohei Yoshino	Fantaisie-Impromptu by Frédéric Chopin choreo. by Kenji Miyamoto	Played A Live choreo. by Safri Duo choreo. by Misao Sato
2019–2020	Paradise performed by The Piano Guys	The Last Samurai (soundtrack) by Hans Zimmer	
2018–2019	Played A Live choreo. by Misao Sato	Les Miserables by Claude-Michel Schönberg choreo. by Kenji Miyamoto	
2017–2018	Caravan by The Ventures choreo. by Misao Sato	Les Miserables by Claude-Michel Schönberg choreo. by Kenji Miyamoto	
2016–2017	Caravan by The Ventures choreo. by Misao Sato	Child of Nazareth by Maxime Rodriguez choreo. by Kenji Miyamoto	
2015–2016	Totentanz by Franz Liszt choreo. by Kenji Miyamoto	Child of Nazareth by Maxime Rodriguez choreo. by Kenji Miyamoto	
2014–2015	Totentanz by Franz Liszt choreo. by Kenji Miyamoto	Pirates of the Caribbean by Hans Zimmer choreo. by Kenji Miyamoto	Afro Circus; I Like to Move It (from Madagascar 3); Totentanz by Franz Liszt choreo. by Kenji Miyamoto

== Competitive highlights ==
- GP – Event of the ISU Grand Prix Series
- JGP – Event of the ISU Junior Grand Prix Series
- CS – Event of the ISU Challenger Series
- TBD – Assigned
- WD – Withdrew from competition
- Medals at team events are awarded for the team results only. Individual placements at team events are listed in parentheses.

Competition placements at senior level
Season	2016–17	2017–18	2018–19	2020–21	2021–22	2022–23	2023–24	2024–25	2025–26
Four Continents Championships					4th				
Japan Championships	9th	11th	17th	10th	6th	12th	9th	6th	17th
GP France						WD			
GP NHK Trophy				9th					
GP Skate America						8th			
CS Cup of Austria					7th				
Challenge Cup								1st	
Coupe du Printemps			1st			4th			
Egna Spring Trophy					2nd				
Japan Open					2nd (6th)				

Competition placements at junior level
Season	2013–14	2014–15	2015–16	2016–17	2017–18	2018–19	2019–20	2020–21
World Junior Championships					18th			
Japan Championships	28th	30th	9th	6th	2nd	6th	7th	3rd
JGP Austria					8th			
JGP Canada						10th		
JGP Italy			8th				10th	
JGP Japan				11th				
JGP Latvia			8th					
Asian Open Trophy					1st			

== Detailed results ==
ISU personal best scores in the +5/-5 GOE System
Segment	Type	Score	Event
Total	**TSS**	**240.02**	2022 Four Continents
Short program	**TSS**	**79.67**	2022 Four Continents
Short program	TES	44.17	2022 Four Continents
Short program	PCS	39.30	2022 Skate America
Free skating	**TSS**	**160.35**	2022 Four Continents
Free skating	TES	81.59	2022 Four Continents
Free skating	PCS	78.76	2022 Four Continents

=== Senior level ===
Small medals for short and free programs awarded only at ISU Championships. At team events, medals awarded for team results only. ISU Personal bests in bold.

Results in the 2025–26 season
Date	Event	SP		FS		Total	
Date	Event	P	Score	P	Score	P	Score
Dec 18–21, 2025	2025–26 Japan Championships	8	75.94	20	125.01	17	200.95

2024–25 season
Date	Event	SP	FS	Total
February 13–16, 2025	2025 Challenge Cup	1; 76.16	2; 132.21	1; 208.37
December 19–22, 2024	2024–25 Japan Championships	11; 75.16	4; 158.33	6; 233.49
2023–24 season
Date	Event	SP	FS	Total
December 20–24, 2023	2023–24 Japan Championships	10; 77.16	9; 148.96	9; 226.12
2022–23 season
Date	Event	SP	FS	Total
March 17–19, 2023	2023 Coupe du Printemps	2; 76.36	4; 135.33	4; 211.69
December 21–25, 2022	2022–23 Japan Championships	9; 76.69	12; 139.41	12; 216.10
November 4–6, 2022	2022 Grand Prix de France	10; 69.27	WD	WD
October 21–23, 2022	2022 Skate America	6; 77.87	9; 137.87	8; 215.74
2021–22 season
Date	Event	SP	FS	Total
April 7–10, 2022	2022 Egna Spring Trophy	2; 81.48	3; 140.73	2; 222.21
January 18–23, 2022	2022 Four Continents Figure Skating Championships	5; 79.67	4; 160.35	4; 240.02
December 22–26, 2021	2021–22 Japan Championships	6; 90.52	7; 162.30	6; 252.82
November 11–14, 2021	2021 CS Cup of Austria	9; 70.57	4; 144.30	7; 214.87
