= Nana Araki =

Japanese figure skater

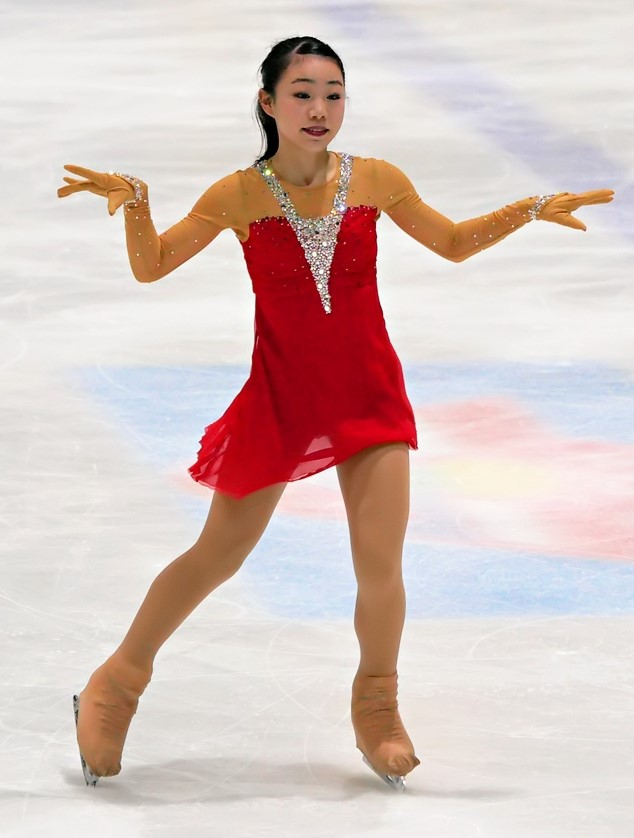
- Araki at the 2018 International Challenge Cup

Personal information
- Native name: 荒木 菜那
- Born: May 3, 2002 (age 24) Higashiura, Japan
- Home town: Higashiura, Japan
- Height: 1.56 m (5 ft 1 1/2 in)

Figure skating career
- Country: Japan
- Coach: Yuko Mona
- Skating club: Chukyo University
- Began skating: 2008

Nana Araki (荒木 菜那 Araki Nana, born May 3, 2002) is a Japanese figure skater. She is the 2017 JGP Belarus silver medalist, the 2018 Challenge Cup Junior champion, and a two-time Japanese Junior national medalist.

== Early life ==
Araki was born in Higashiura, Japan, on May 3, 2002. She began skating in 2008.

== Career ==
2017-18 season

Araki made her international debut at the 2017 JGP Belarus, where she won the silver medal behind Alexandra Ignatova. She was fourth at her second assignment, the 2017 JGP Italy.

She won the bronze medal at the 2018 Japan Junior Championships behind Rika Kihira and Mako Yamashita and was invited to skate at the 2018 Japan Championships, where she placed 13th. She ended her season with a gold medal at the 2018 Challenge Cup.

2018-19 season

Araki began her season at the 2018 JGP Czech , where she placed fifth. She repeated her placement at her second event in Armenia. At the Japan Junior National Championships, she was the silver medalist behind Yuhana Yokoi. She closed her season at the senior National Championships, where she placed 13th.

She won the silver medal at the 2019 Japan Junior Championships behind Yuhana Yokoi and closed her season with another thirteenth-place finish at the 2019 Japan Championships.

2019-20 season

For the 2019-20 season, Araki had her free skate choreographed by Miki Ando, a two-time World champion whom Araki looks up to.

Araki debuted her programs at the 2019 JGP Courchevel, where she placed fourth behind Maya Khromykh. She then competed at the 2019 JGP Chelyabinsk, where she also placed fourth. She went on to place sixteenth at the 2020 Japan Junior Championships.

2020-21 season

Due to the COVID-19 pandemic, Araki was assigned to compete at the 2020 NHK Trophy. She placed eleventh at the event.

2021-22 season

Araki placed fourteenth at the 2022 Japan Championships.

2022-23 season

Araki did not compete during this season.

2023-24 season

Araki placed twenty-seventh at the 2024 Japan Championships. She subsequently announced her retirement from competition via Instagram.

== Programs ==
| Season | Short program | Free skating | Exhibition |
|---|---|---|---|
| 2023–24 | You Raise Me Up choreo. by Miki Ando | The sky and the dawn and the sun choreo. by Miki Ando | |
| 2021–22 | Bloodstream by Tokio Myers choreo. by Mihoko Higuchi | Courage by Celine Dion choreo. by Mihoko Higuchi | |
| 2020–21 | That Man by Caro Emerald choreo. by Mari Araya | Nausicaä of the Valley of the Wind by Joe Hisaishi choreo. by Miki Ando | |
| 2019–20 | Destino from The Princess' Man by Lee Ji-yong choreo. by Kenji Miyamoto | Nausicaä of the Valley of the Wind by Joe Hisaishi choreo. by Miki Ando | |
| 2018–19 | Bei mir bist du schoen by Sholom Secunda choreo. by Cathy Reed | Once Upon a Dream by Sammy Fain performed by Lana Del Rey choreo. by Kenji Miyamoto | Ev'rybody Wants to Be a Cat from The Aristocats |
| 2017–18 | Bei mir bist du schoen by Sholom Secunda choreo. by Cathy Reed | Come, People of God by Lee Soo Jeong choreo. by Kenji Miyamoto | |

== Competitive highlights ==
GP: Grand Prix; JGP: Junior Grand Prix

International
| Event | 12–13 | 13–14 | 14–15 | 15–16 | 16–17 | 17–18 | 18–19 | 19–20 | 20–21 | 21–22 | 23–24 |
|---|---|---|---|---|---|---|---|---|---|---|---|
| GP NHK Trophy | | | | | | | | | 11th | | |
International: Junior
| JGP Armenia | | | | | | | 5th | | | | |
| JGP Belarus | | | | | | 2nd | | | | | |
| JGP Czech Rep. | | | | | | | 5th | | | | |
| JGP France | | | | | | | | 4th | | | |
| JGP Italy | | | | | | 4th | | | | | |
| JGP Russia | | | | | | | | 4th | | | |
| Challenge Cup | | | | | | 1st | | | | | |
National
| Japan Champ. | | | | | | 13th | 13th | | | 14th | 27th |
| Japan Junior | | | | 12th | | 3rd | 2nd | 16th | | | |
| Japan Western Sect. | | | | 16th J | 25th J | 4th J | 2nd J | 2nd J | 14th | 1st | 6th |
| Chubu Reg. | 12th B | 13th A | 8th A | 2nd J | 2nd J | | | 2nd J | 7th | 5th | 7th |
Levels: A = Novice; B = Novice B; J = Junior
