= Hiroaki Sato (figure skater) =

Japanese figure skater (born 1995)

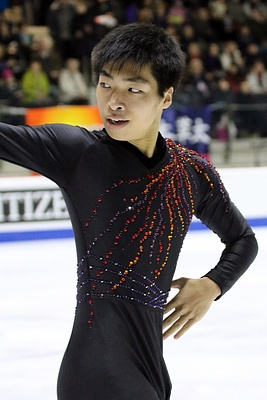

Personal information
- Native name: 佐藤洸彬
- Born: December 6, 1995 (age 30) Morioka, Japan
- Height: 1.64 m (5 ft 4 1/2 in)

Figure skating career
- Country: Japan
- Coach: Masanori Sasaki
- Skating club: Morioka FSC
- Began skating: 2005
- Retired: December 2019

Hiroaki Sato (佐藤 洸彬, Satō Hiroaki; born December 6, 1995) is a Japanese retired figure skater. He was named in Japan's team to the 2015 World Junior Championships in Tallinn, Estonia. Sato ranked 17th in the short program, 14th in the free skate, and 15th overall. He has won three senior international medals.

== Coaching career ==
Following his retirement from competitive figure skating, Sato became a coach. He currently coaches at the Kinoshita Academy in Uji, Kyoto.

His current and former students include:

- Mone Chiba
- Lucas Tsuyoshi Honda
- Sumika Kanazawa
- Ayumi Katogani / Lucas Tsuyoshi Honda
- Yuto Kishina
- Riria Kono
- Ikura Kushida
- Ryoga Morimoto
- Haruna Murakami
- Yuna Nagaoka / Sumitada Moriguchi
- Mayuko Oka
- Ayumi Shibayama
- Mao Shimada
- Sena Takahashi
- Hana Yoshida

== Programs ==
| Season | Short program | Free skating |
|---|---|---|
| 2019–2020 | Chaplin Medley choreo. by Misao Sato | Symphony No. 5 by Dmitri Shostakovich choreo. by Misao Sato |
| 2018–2019 | Too close choreo. by Massimo Scali | Symphony No. 5 by Dmitri Shostakovich choreo. by Misao Sato |
| 2017–2018 | Totem (Cirque du Soleil) choreo. by Misao Sato | The Barber of Seville by Gioachino Rossini choreo. by Misao Sato |
| 2014–2015 | Ghali Alay by Carole Samaha | Mibugishiden by Joe Hisaishi |

== Competitive highlights ==
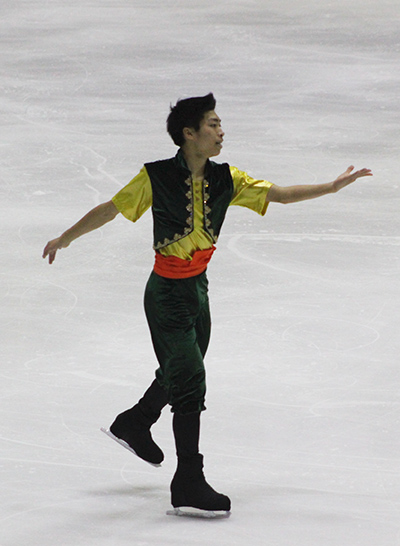
Hiroaki Sato in 2015

GP: Grand Prix; CS: Challenger Series; JGP: Junior Grand Prix

International
| Event | 05–06 | 06–07 | 07–08 | 08–09 | 09–10 | 10–11 | 11–12 | 12–13 | 13–14 | 14–15 | 15–16 | 16–17 | 17–18 | 18–19 | 19–20 | 20–21 |
|---|---|---|---|---|---|---|---|---|---|---|---|---|---|---|---|---|
| GP NHK Trophy | | | | | | | | | | | | | 11th | 10th | | |
| CS Lombardia | | | | | | | | | | | | | 12th | | | |
| CS U.S. Classic | | | | | | | | | | | | | | 6th | | |
| Asian Trophy | | | | | | | | | | | 3rd | | | | | |
| Bavarian Open | | | | | | | | | | | | 2nd | | | | |
| Gardena Trophy | | | | | | | | | | 3rd | | | | | | |
| Printemps | | | | | | | | | | | | | 4th | | | |
| Universiade | | | | | | | | | | | | | | 7th | | |
International: Junior
| Junior Worlds | | | | | | | | | | 15th | | | | | | |
| JGP France | | | | | | | | | | 8th | | | | | | |
National
| Japan | | | | | | | | | | 10th | 18th | 8th | 8th | 13th | 9th | |
| Japan Junior | | | | 27th | | 27th | 10th | 13th | 11th | | | | | | | |
| Japan Novice | 13th B | 7th B | 7th A | 2nd A | | | | | | | | | | | | |
| Eastern Sect. | | | | | | | 6th J | 2nd J | 3rd J | | | | | | | |
Team Events
| Japan Open | | | | | | | | | | | | | | | | 1st T 4th P |
T = Team result; P = Personal result. Medals awarded for team result only.
