= Josée Piché =

Canadian ice dancer

Personal information
- Born: July 19, 1974 (age 52) Montreal, Quebec
- Height: 1.63 m (5 ft 4 in)

Figure skating career
- Country: Canada
- Skating club: QC Section Montreal
- Began skating: 1985
- Retired: 2004

Josée Piché (born July 19, 1974) is a Canadian former ice dancer. She was born in Montreal and competed with partner Pascal Denis for 17 years, winning a bronze medal at the 2000 Canadian Figure Skating Championships and finishing 23rd at the 2004 World Figure Skating Championships, their final competition together.

== Programs ==
(with Denis)

Season	Original dance	Free dance
2003–2004	Swing: Sing, Sing, Sing; Blues: Big Spender; Swing: Sing, Sing, Sing	Angel and Devil by Maxime Rodriguez
2002–2003	Waltz: Frühlingstimmen op 410; Polka: Unter Donner und Blitz op. 324 by Johann Strauss II	Four Seasons; Concerto in F Minor L'Inverno Allegro by Antonio Vivaldi; Vival / Bond by Antonio Vivaldi performed by Bond
2001–2002	The Mask of Zorro by James Horner: The Plaza of Execution; The Fencing Lesson; Tornado in the Barracks	The Phantom of the Opera; Music of the Night (from The Phantom of the Opera) by Andrew Lloyd Webber

== Results ==
GP: Grand Prix

with Denis

International
Event	92–93	93–94	96–97	99–00	00–01	01–02	02–03	03–04
Worlds								23rd
Four Continents				6th		5th		7th
GP Cup of China								5th
GP Cup of Russia						10th		
GP Skate America							9th	
GP Skate Canada						9th	10th	10th
Nebelhorn Trophy			5th					
Skate America		9th						
International: Junior
Junior Worlds	9th							
National
Canadian Champ.	3rd J	2nd J		3rd	4th	4th	4th	4th
J = Junior
