= Shu Nakamura =

Japanese figure skater

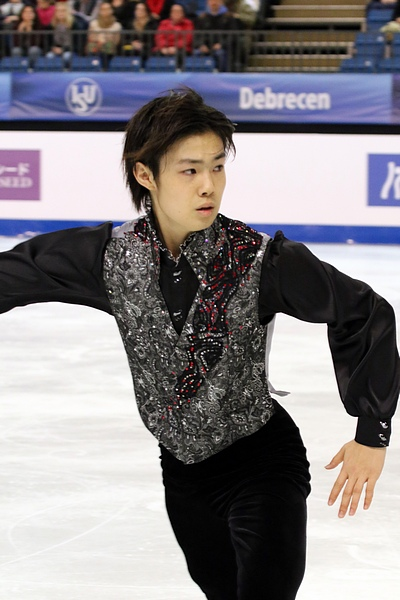

Personal information
- Native name: 中村 優
- Born: 7 September 1996 (age 30) Kushiro, Hokkaido, Japan
- Height: 1.70 m (5 ft 7 in)

Figure skating career
- Country: Japan
- Coach: Utako Nagamitsu, Takeshi Honda, Mari Araya, Mamiko Yamai, Aki Sawada
- Skating club: Kansai University, Osaka
- Began skating: 2004

Shu Nakamura (中村 優, Nakamura Shū; born 7 September 1996) is a Japanese figure skater. He finished sixth at the 2012 Winter Youth Olympics in Innsbruck, Austria, after placing tenth in the short program and third in the free skate. He won the bronze medal at the 2014–15 Japan Junior Championships and finished 12th at the 2016 World Junior Championships in Debrecen, Hungary. In February 2017, he won his first senior international medal, bronze at the Bavarian Open.

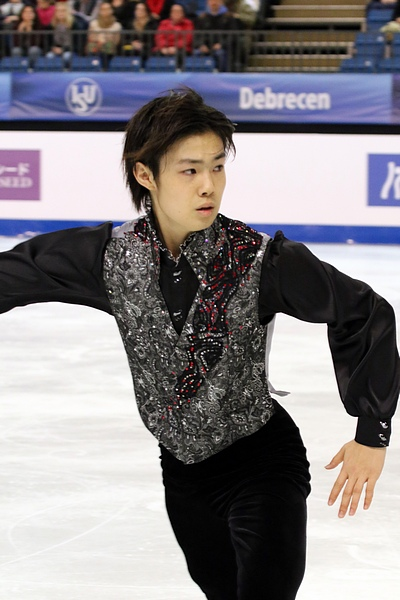
Nakamura during the 2016 Junior Worlds Championship

== Programs ==
| Season | Short program | Free skating |
|---|---|---|
| 2019–20 | My Way by Jacques Revaux choreo. by Jeffrey Buttle | Moulin Rouge! choreo. by Jeffrey Buttle |
| 2018–19 | Eleanor Rigby by Lennon–McCartney choreo. by Jeffrey Buttle | Romeo & Juliet by Pyotr Ilyich Tchaikovsky choreo. by Jeffrey Buttle |
| 2017–18 | Eleanor Rigby by Lennon–McCartney choreo. by Jeffrey Buttle | Moulin Rouge! choreo. by Jeffrey Buttle |
| 2016–17 | Feeling Good by Michael Bublé choreo. by Cathy Reed | Moulin Rouge! choreo. by Jeffrey Buttle |
| 2015–16 | Libertango by Astor Piazzolla choreo. by Eiji Iwamoto | Piano Concerto No. 2 by Sergei Rachmaninoff choreo. by Robert Dow |
| 2014–15 | Libertango by Astor Piazzolla choreo. by Eiji Iwamoto | The Four Seasons by Antonio Vivaldi choreo. by Robert Dow |
| 2013–14 | Come on in this House by Junior Wells choreo. by Robert Dow | Violin Concerto No. 1 in G Minor, Op. 26 by Max Bruch choreo. by Robert Dow |
| 2012–13 | Sing, Sing, Sing by Louis Prima | Violin Concerto No. 1 in G Minor, Op. 26 by Max Bruch choreo. by Robert Dow |

== Competitive highlights ==
GP: Grand Prix; CS: Challenger Series; JGP: Junior Grand Prix

International
| Event | 07–08 | 08–09 | 09–10 | 10–11 | 11–12 | 12–13 | 13–14 | 14–15 | 15–16 | 16–17 | 17–18 | 18–19 | 19–20 |
|---|---|---|---|---|---|---|---|---|---|---|---|---|---|
| Bavarian Open | | | | | | | | | | 3rd | | | |
| Universiade | | | | | | | | | | | | 8th | |
International: Junior
| Junior Worlds | | | | | | | | | 12th | | | | |
| Youth Olympics | | | | | 6th | | | | | | | | |
| JGP Austria | | | | | | | | | 10th | | | | |
| JGP Estonia | | | | | | | 9th | | | | | | |
| JGP Germany | | | | | | 8th | | | | | | | |
| JGP Italy | | | | | 18th | | | | | | | | |
| JGP Poland | | | | | | | 5th | | | | | | |
| JGP Slovenia | | | | | | | | 10th | | | | | |
| JGP Turkey | | | | | | 6th | | | | | | | |
| Gardena | | | | | | 2nd J | | | | | | | |
National
| Japan | | | | | | | | 12th | 9th | 6th | 14th | 11th | 16th |
| Japan Junior | | | 23rd | 16th | 12th | 8th | 8th | 3rd | 5th | | | | |
| Japan Novice | 2nd B | | 2nd A | | | | | | | | | | |
J = Junior level
