= Yuhana Yokoi =

Japanese figure skater

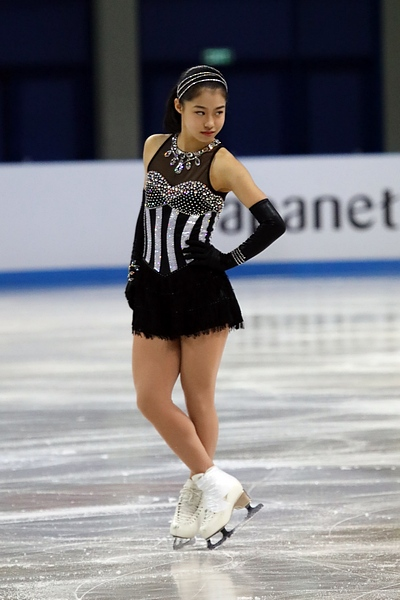
- Yokoi at the 2018 World Junior Championships

Personal information
- Native name: 横井 ゆは菜
- Born: May 19, 2000 (age 26) Nagoya, Japan
- Height: 1.57 m (5 ft 2 in)

Figure skating career
- Country: Japan
- Coach: Yoriko Naruse; Miho Kawaume; Yuko Hongo
- Skating club: Chukyo University
- Began skating: 2008
- Retired: December 24, 2022

Yuhana Yokoi (Japanese: 横井 ゆは菜; born May 19, 2000) is a retired Japanese figure skater. She is the 2019 CS Finlandia Trophy bronze medalist and the 2020 Challenge Cup silver medalist. At the junior level, she is the 2018 JGP Armenia bronze medalist, and two-time Japanese Junior national medalist. She finished within the top ten at two World Junior Championships (2018, 2019).

== Personal life ==
Yokoi was born on May 19, 2000 in Nagoya, Japan. Her sister, Kinayu, who is four years younger than her, is also a competitive figure skater.

Yokoi studied at the School of Sport Sciences at Chukyo University.

== Career ==
=== Early years ===
Yokoi began learning to skate in 2008. She made her ISU Junior Grand Prix debut in September 2014, placing sixth in Nagoya, Japan. At the 2015–16 Japan Championships, she won bronze in the junior event and finished eleventh in the senior event.

=== 2017–18 season ===
At the 2017–18 Japan Championships, Yokoi finished fourth in the junior event and eighth in the senior event. In March, she competed at the 2018 World Junior Championships in Sofia, Bulgaria. Ranked eighth in the short and fourth in the free, she finished sixth overall.

=== 2018–19 season ===
In October, Yokoi won bronze at the ISU Junior Grand Prix in Armenia. In November, she became Japan's junior national champion. She finished seventh competing in the senior ranks at the 2018–19 Japan Championships in December.

In March, she placed eighteenth in the short, eighth in the free, and ninth overall at the 2019 World Junior Championships in Zagreb, Croatia.

In April, she was invited to skate in the gala at the 2019 World Team Trophy as the Japan junior national champion.

=== 2019–20 season ===
In October, making her senior international debut, Yokoi won the bronze medal at the 2019 CS Finlandia Trophy. In November, she competed at two Grand Prix events, placing sixth at the 2019 Rostelecom Cup and fourth at the 2019 NHK Trophy. The following month, she finished fifth at the 2019–20 Japan Championships.

In February 2020, Yokoi won silver at the International Challenge Cup in The Hague, Netherlands.

=== 2020–21 season ===
With the COVID-19 pandemic limiting international competitions, Yokoi was assigned to compete at the 2020 NHK Trophy, which was attended almost exclusively by Japanese skaters. She was fifth in the short program, her only error being an under-rotation on her solo triple flip jump. In the free skate, she made several errors, finishing eighth in that segment and dropping to eighth place overall.

Yokoi placed eighth at the 2020–21 Japan Championships.

=== 2021–22 season ===
Yokoi placed eleventh at the 2021 Skate America, her lone Grand Prix assignment. She was ninth at the 2021 Internationaux de France, saying that she was very pleased with her free skate: "I still wonder if I should continue, and when I have a good performance, I am truly happy, and that is why it keeps me going. Today's good performance made me feel that I might be able to continue."

At the 2021–22 Japan Championships, Yokoi placed twelfth. She was named to the Japanese team for the 2022 Four Continents Championships, where she finished in seventh.

=== 2022–23 season ===
In her lone Grand Prix assignment of the year, Yokoi finished eighth at the 2022 Skate Canada International. After coming nineteenth at the 2022–23 Japan Championships, she announced her retirement from competitive skating.

== Programs ==
Season	Short program	Free skating	Exhibition
2022–2023	Kalandéro (from Alegría) by René Dupéré choreo. by Misao Sato	Hungarian Rhapsody by Franz Liszt choreo. by Akiko Suzuki	
2021–2022	Malagueña by Ernesto Lecuona choreo. by Kenji Miyamoto	Fat Bottomed Girls; We Will Rock You; We Are the Champions by Queen choreo. by Kenji Miyamoto	
2020–2021	Nandemonaiya by Yojiro Noda choreo. by Akiko Suzuki	Tom and Jerry by Scott Bradley choreo. by Misao Sato	
2019–2020	Ten Dark Women by Shu Kanematsu choreo. by Misao Sato	The Phantom of the Opera: Angel of Music performed by Sarah Brightman; All I Ask of You performed by Sarah Brightman and Michael Crawford by Andrew Lloyd Webber choreo. by Miho Kawaume	Never Enough by Loren Allred
2018–2019	The Lion King by Hans Zimmer choreo. by Miho Kawaume	The Phantom of the Opera: Angel of Music performed by Sarah Brightman; All I Ask of You performed by Sarah Brightman and Michael Crawford by Andrew Lloyd Webber choreo. by Miho Kawaume	Never Enough by Loren Allred
2017–2018	The Lion King by Hans Zimmer choreo. by Miho Kawaume	Burlesque: You Haven't Seen the Last of Me; Welcome to Burlesque by Cher; Show Me How You Burlesque by Christina Aguilera choreo. by Akiko Suzuki	
2016–2017	The Sound of Music: The Sound of Music; My Favorite Things; Climb Ev'ry Mountain by Richard Rodgers and Oscar Hammerstein II choreo. by Yuko Hongo	Burlesque: You Haven't Seen the Last of Me; Welcome to Burlesque by Cher; Show Me How You Burlesque by Christina Aguilera choreo. by Akiko Suzuki	
2015–2016	The Sound of Music: The Sound of Music; My Favorite Things; Climb Ev'ry Mountain by Richard Rodgers and Oscar Hammerstein II choreo. by Yuko Hongo	Malagueña choreo. by Yuko Hongo	
2014–2015	Masquerade: Waltz by Aram Khachaturian choreo. by Yuko Hongo	Gypsy music choreo. by Yuko Hongo	

== Competitive highlights ==
GP: Grand Prix; CS: Challenger Series; JGP: Junior Grand Prix

International
Event	10–11	11–12	12–13	13–14	14–15	15–16	16–17	17–18	18–19	19–20	20–21	21–22	22–23
Four Continents												7th	
GP France												9th	
GP NHK Trophy										4th	8th		
GP Rostelecom Cup										6th			
GP Skate America												11th	
GP Skate Canada													8th
CS Finlandia Trophy										3rd			
CS Warsaw Cup												WD	
Challenge Cup										2nd			
International: Junior
Junior Worlds								6th	9th				
JGP Armenia									3rd				
JGP Japan					6th								
JGP Latvia								5th					
JGP Slovakia									6th				
Challenge Cup								2nd	1st				
International: Advanced novice
Gardena Spring			2nd										
National
Japan Champ.						11th		8th	7th	5th	8th	12th	19th
Japan Junior				12th	26th	3rd	8th	4th	1st				
Japan Novice			6th A										
Western Sect.				9th J	4th J	1st J	5th J	5th J	1st J	1st	7th		
Chubu Reg.	8th B		4th A	2nd J	1st J	1st J	1st J	1st J	1st J	2nd	4th	2nd	3rd
Team events
Japan Open											1st T 4th P		
TBD = Assigned; WD = Withdrew; Levels: A = Novice A; J = Junior; T = Team result; P = Personal result. Medals awarded for team result only.

== Detailed results ==
ISU Personal best highlighted in bold.

=== Senior ===
2022–23 season
Date	Event	SP	FS	Total
December 21–25, 2022	2022–23 Japan Championships	12; 59.78	20; 102.09	19; 161.87
October 28–30, 2022	2022 Skate Canada	12; 54.87	5; 123.86	8; 178.73
**2021–22 season**
Date	Event	SP	FS	Total
January 18–23, 2022	2022 Four Continents Championships	12; 53.93	6; 131.41	7; 185.34
December 22–26, 2021	2021–22 Japan Championships	14; 59.84	9; 124.00	12; 183.84
November 19–21, 2021	2021 Internationaux de France	11; 52.32	7; 124.61	9; 176.93
October 22–24, 2021	2021 Skate America	12; 54.77	10; 119.30	11; 174.07
2020–21 season
Date	Event	SP	FS	Total
December 24–27, 2020	2020–21 Japan Championships	16; 59.83	6; 134.39	8; 194.22
November 27–29, 2020	2020 NHK Trophy	5; 65.18	8; 111.31	8; 176.49
2019–20 season
Date	Event	SP	FS	Total
February 20–23, 2020	2020 Challenge Cup	2; 73.29	2; 141.27	2; 214.56
December 18–22, 2019	2019–20 Japan Championships	9; 62.90	4; 128.02	5; 190.92
November 22–24, 2019	2019 NHK Trophy	8; 62.67	4; **126.87**	4; 189.54
November 15–17, 2019	2019 Rostelecom Cup	10; 56.51	5; 126.17	6; 182.68
October 11–13, 2019	2019 CS Finlandia Trophy	3; **65.09**	3; 126.81	3; **191.90**

=== Junior ===
2018–19 season
Date	Event	Level	SP	FS	Total
March 4–10, 2019	2019 World Junior Championships	Junior	18; 51.61	8; 118.56	9; 170.17
February 21–24, 2019	2019 Challenge Cup	Junior	1; 53.63	1; 126.27	1; 179.90
December 20–24, 2018	2018–19 Japan Championships	Senior	6; 66.27	6; 130.10	7; 196.37
November 23–25, 2018	2018–19 Japan Junior Championships	Junior	1; 61.86	1; 119.98	1; 181.84
October 10–13, 2018	2018 JGP Armenia	Junior	6; 57.62	2; 126.47	3; 184.09
August 22–25, 2018	2018 JGP Slovakia	Junior	9; 51.65	2; 121.50	6; 173.15
2017–18 season
Date	Event	Level	SP	FS	Total
March 5–11, 2018	2018 World Junior Championships	Junior	8; 59.81	4; 124.97	6; 184.78
February 22–25, 2018	2018 Challenge Cup	Junior	4; 54.09	2; 115.62	2; 169.71
December 20–24, 2017	2017–18 Japan Championships	Senior	9; 62.68	6; 130.31	8; 192.99
November 24–26, 2017	2017–18 Japan Junior Championships	Junior	7; 56.89	3; 116.08	4; 172.97
September 6–9, 2017	2017 JGP Latvia	Junior	5; 55.19	3; 114.40	5; 169.59
2016–17 season
Date	Event	Level	SP	FS	Total
November 18–20, 2016	2016–17 Japan Junior Championships	Junior	10; 52.28	7; 110.56	8; 162.84
2015–16 season
Date	Event	Level	SP	FS	Total
December 24, 2015	2015–16 Japan Junior Championships	Junior	4; 60.16	3; 117.24	3; 177.40
2015–16 season
Date	Event	Level	SP	FS	Total
November 22, 2014	2014–15 Japan Junior Championships	Junior	26; 41.27		26; 41.27
2013–14 season
Date	Event	Level	SP	FS	Total
November 22, 2013	2013–14 Japan Junior Championships	Junior	23; 40.84	9; 95.89	12; 136.73
