= Pascal Denis =

Canadian ice dancer

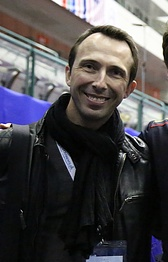

Personal information
- Born: May 20, 1975 (age 51) Repentigny, Quebec, Canada
- Height: 1.88 m (6 ft 2 in)

Figure skating career
- Country: Canada
- Skating club: QC Section Montreal
- Began skating: 1982
- Retired: 2005

Pascal Denis (born May 20, 1975, in Repentigny, Quebec) is a Canadian former ice dancer. He competed with partner Josée Piché for 17 years, winning a bronze medal at the 2000 Canadian Figure Skating Championships and finishing 23rd at the 2004 World Figure Skating Championships, their final competition together. Denis later skated with Martine Patenaude.

== Programs ==
=== With Patenaude ===
Season	Original dance	Free dance
2004–2005	Chicago soundtrack by J. Kander and F. Ebb (Charleston, Slow Foxtrot, Charleston)	Moulin Rouge!: Sparkling Diamonds; Tango de Roxane

=== With Piché ===
Season	Original dance	Free dance
2003–2004	Swing: Sing, Sing, Sing; Blues: Big Spender; Swing: Sing, Sing, Sing	Angel and Devil by Maxime Rodriguez
2002–2003	Waltz: Frühlingstimmen op 410; Polka: Unter Donner und Blitz op. 324 by Johann Strauss II	Four Seasons; Concerto in F Minor L'Inverno Allegro by Antonio Vivaldi; Vival / Bond by Antonio Vivaldi performed by Bond
2001–2002	The Mask of Zorro by James Horner: The Plaza of Execution; The Fencing Lesson; Tornado in the Barracks	The Phantom of the Opera; Music of the Night (from The Phantom of the Opera) by Andrew Lloyd Webber

== Results ==
GP: Grand Prix

=== With Patenaude ===
International
Event	2004–2005
Four Continents Championships	7th
GP Skate Canada International	8th
Nebelhorn Trophy	2nd
National
Canadian Championships	6th

=== With Piché ===
International
Event	92–93	93–94	96–97	99–00	00–01	01–02	02–03	03–04
Worlds								23rd
Four Continents				6th		5th		7th
GP Cup of China								5th
GP Cup of Russia						10th		
GP Skate America							9th	
GP Skate Canada						9th	10th	10th
Nebelhorn Trophy			5th					
Skate America		9th						
International: Junior
Junior Worlds	9th							
National
Canadian Champ.	3rd J	2nd J		3rd	4th	4th	4th	4th
J = Junior
