= 2019–20 national figure skating championships =

- Type: National championship
- Season: 2019–20
- Host: ISU member nations
- Previous: 2018–19
- Next: 2020–21

National figure skating championships of the 2019–20 season took place mainly from December 2019 to January 2020. They were held to crown national champions and served as part of the selection process for international events, such as the 2020 ISU Figure Skating Championships. Medals were awarded in the disciplines of men's singles, ladies' singles, pair skating, and ice dance. A few countries chose to organize their national championships together with their neighbors; the results were subsequently divided into national podiums.

== Competitions ==
Key
Nationals	Other domestic

Date	Event	Type	Level	Disc.	Location	Refs
2019
2–3 August	Chinese Taipei Championships	Nat.	Sen.–Nov.	M/L	Taipei, Taiwan	
14–16 September	Chinese Championships	Nat.	Sen.–Jun.	All	Changchun, China	
26–29 September	Master's de Patinage	Other	Sen.–Jun.	All	Villard-de-Lans, France	
3–6 October	New Zealand Championships	Nat.	Sen.–Nov.	M/L/D	Gore, New Zealand	
15–17 November	Japan Junior Champ.	Nat.	Junior	M/L/D	Yokohama, Japan	
22–23 November	Belgian Championships	Nat.	Sen.–Nov.	M/L	Wilrijk, Belgium	
27–28 November	Serbian Championships	Nat.	Sen.–Nov.	L	Beograd, Serbia	
27 Nov. – 1 Dec.	Skate Canada Challenge	Other	Sen.–Nov.	All	Edmonton, Alberta, Canada	
28 Nov. – 1 Dec.	British Championships	Nat.	Sen.–Nov.	All	Sheffield, England, U.K.	
29 Nov. – 1 Dec.	Bulgarian Championships	Nat.	Sen.–Nov.	M/L/D	Sofia, Bulgaria	
30 Nov. – 1 Dec.	Icelandic Championships	Nat.	Jun.–Nov.	L	Laugardalur, Iceland	
30 Nov. – 6 Dec.	Australian Championships	Nat.	Sen.–Nov.	All	Melbourne, Victoria, Australia	
6–8 December	Danish Championships	Nat.	Sen.–Nov.	M/L/D	Gentofte, Denmark	
6–8 December	Lithuanian Championships	Nat.	Sen.–Nov.	M/L	Kaunas, Lithuania	
7–8 December	Swiss Championships	Nat.	Sen.–Nov.	All	Biel-Bienne, Switzerland	
11–12 December	Israeli Championships	Nat.	Sen.–Nov.	All	Holon, Israel	
11–14 December	Austrian Championships	Nat.	Sen.–Nov.	All	Klagenfurt, Austria	
12–14 December	Four Nationals (Czech/Hungarian/Polish/Slovak)	Nat.	Sen.–Nov.	All	Ostrava, Czech Republic	
12–15 December	Italian Championships	Nat.	Sen.–Jun.	All	Bergamo, Italy	
12–15 December	Swedish Championships	Nat.	Sen.–Nov.	M/L/P	Ulricehamn, Sweden	
13–15 December	Estonian Championships	Nat	Sen.–Jun.	M/L/D	Tallinn, Estonia	
13–15 December	German Junior Champ.	Nat	Jun.–Nov.	M/L	Mannheim, Germany	
13–15 December	Spanish Championships	Nat.	Sen.–Nov.	All	San Sebastián, Spain	
14–15 December	Belarusian Championships	Nat.	Senior	M/L/D	Minsk, Belarus	
14–15 December	Croatian Championships	Nat.	Sen.–Nov.	M/L	Sisak, Croatia	
14–15 December	Finnish Championships	Nat.	Sen.–Jun.	M/L/D	Vantaa, Finland	
14–15 December	Latvian Championships	Nat.	Sen.–Nov.	M/L/D	Mārupe, Latvia	
14–15 December	Slovenian Championships	Nat.	Sen.–Nov.	M/L	Ljubljana, Slovenia	
17–19 December	Ukrainian Championships	Nat.	Senior	All	Kyiv, Ukraine	
18–22 December	Japan Championships	Nat.	Senior	All	Tokyo, Japan	
19–20 December	Romanian Championships	Nat.	Sen.–Nov.	M/L	Otopeni, Romania	
19–21 December	French Championships	Nat.	Senior	All	Dunkerque, France	
24–29 December	Russian Championships	Nat.	Senior	All	Krasnoyarsk, Russia	
2020
2–3 January	German Championships	Nat.	Sen.–Nov.	All	Oberstdorf, Germany	
3–5 January	South Korean Championships	Nat.	Sen.–Jun.	M/L/D	Uijeongbu, South Korea	
3–5 January	Turkish Championships	Nat.	Sen.–Nov.	M/L	Samsun, Turkey	
10–12 January	Norwegian Championships	Nat.	Sen.–Nov.	M/L	Asker, Norway	
13–19 January	Canadian Championships	Nat.	Sen.–Nov.	All	Mississauga, Ontario, Canada	
20–26 January	U.S. Championships	Nat.	Sen.–Jun.	All	Greensboro, North Carolina, U.S.	
1–2 February	Estonian Junior Champ.	Nat	Jun.–Nov.	M/L/D	Tallinn, Estonia	
1–2 February	Swiss Junior Champ.	Nat.	Jun.–Nov.	M/L	Monthey, Switzerland	
3–5 February	Belarusian Junior Champ.	Nat.	Junior	M/L/D	Minsk, Belarus	
4–6 February	Ukrainian Junior Champ.	Nat.	Junior	All	Kyiv, Ukraine	
4–8 February	Russian Junior Champ.	Nat.	Junior	All	Saransk, Russia	
7–8 February	Czech Junior Champ.	Nat.	Sen.–Nov.	M/L/D	Litoměřice, Czech Republic	
7–8 February	Polish Junior Champ.	Nat.	Junior	M/L	Krynica-Zdrój, Poland	
7–9 February	French Junior Champ.	Nat.	Junior	All	Charleville-Mézières, France	
7–9 February	Hungarian Junior Champ.	Nat.	Jun.–Nov.	M/L/D	Budapest, Hungary	
16–26 February	Chinese National Winter Games	Other	Senior	All	Inner Mongolia, China	(Note: Canceled due to the COVID-19 pandemic.)
18–22 February	Russian Cup Final	Other	Sen.–Jun.	All	Veliky Novgorod, Russia	
20–23 February	Dutch Championships	Nat.	Sen.–Nov.	All	The Hague, Netherlands	
24–25 February	Irish Championships	Nat.	Sen.–Nov.	M/L	London, England, U.K.	

== Senior medalists ==
=== Men ===
Men
Nation	Gold	Silver	Bronze	Refs
Australia	Brendan Kerry	James Min	Darian Kaptich	
Austria	Maurizio Zandron	Albert Mück	Manuel Drechsler	
Belarus	Yauhenii Puzanau	Aleksandr Lebedev	Konstantin Milyukov	
Bulgaria	Larry Loupolover	Nicky-Leo Obreykov	—N/a	
Canada	Roman Sadovsky	Nam Nguyen	Keegan Messing	
China	Yan Han	Zhang He	Wang Yi	
Chinese Taipei	Tsao Chih-i	Micah Lynn Tang	—N/a	
Croatia	Jari Kessler	—N/a		
Czech Republic	Michal Březina	Matyáš Bělohradský	Jiří Bělohradský	
Denmark	Daniel Tsion	Nikolaj Mølgaard Pedersen	—N/a	
Estonia	Aleksandr Selevko	Mihhail Selevko	Daniel Albert Naurits	
Finland	Roman Galay	Valtter Virtanen	Lauri Lankila	
France	Kévin Aymoz	Adam Siao Him Fa	Romain Ponsart	
Germany	Paul Fentz	Jonathan Hess	Thomas Stoll	
(United Kingdom) Great Britain	Peter James Hallam	Graham Newberry	Harry Mattick	
Hungary	András Csernoch	Máté Böröcz	—N/a	
(Republic of Ireland) Ireland	Samuel McAllister	—N/a		
Israel	Mark Gorodnitsky	Daniel Samohin	Alexei Bychenko	
Italy	Daniel Grassl	Matteo Rizzo	Mattia Dalla Torre	
Japan	Shoma Uno	Yuzuru Hanyu	Yuma Kagiyama	
Latvia	Deniss Vasiļjevs	—N/a		
Netherlands	Thomas Kennes	—N/a		
New Zealand	Brian Lee	—N/a		
Norway	Sondre Oddvoll Bøe	—N/a		
Poland	Mikchail Mogilen	Łukasz Kędzierski	Miłosz Witkowski	
Romania	Dorian Kecskes	—N/a		
Russia	Dmitri Aliev	Artur Danielian	Alexander Samarin	
Slovakia	Michael Neuman	Marco Klepoch	—N/a	
South Korea	Cha Jun-hwan	Lee Si-hyeong	Lee June-hyoung	
Spain	Aleix Gabara Xancó	—N/a		
Sweden	Nikolaj Majorov	Illya Solomin	Natran Tzagai	
Switzerland	Lukas Britschgi	Nurullah Sahaka	Nicola Todeschini	
Turkey	Burak Demirboğa	—N/a		
Ukraine	Ivan Shmuratko	Kyrylo Lishenko	Andriy Kokura	
United States	Nathan Chen	Jason Brown	Tomoki Hiwatashi	

=== Ladies ===
Ladies
Nation	Gold	Silver	Bronze	Refs
Australia	Kailani Craine	Yancey Chan	Ashley Colliver	
Austria	Olga Mikutina	Sophia Schaller	Stefanie Pesendorfer	
Belarus	Viktoriia Safonova	Milana Ramashova	Nastassia Sidarenka	
Belgium	Naomi Mugnier	Jade Hovine	—N/a	
Bulgaria	Alexandra Feigin	Kristina Grigorova	Simona Gospodinova	
Canada	Emily Bausback	Alison Schumacher	Madeline Schizas	
China	An Xiangyi	Chen Hongyi	Lin Shan	
Chinese Taipei	Emmy Ma	Jenny Shyu	Levana Wu	
Croatia	Hana Cvijanović	Patricia Skopančić	Mihaela Stimac Rojtinić	
Czech Republic	Eliška Březinová	Nikola Rychtaříková	Kateřina Fričová	
Denmark	Camilla Grue	Sofia Korsgaard	—N/a	
Estonia	Eva-Lotta Kiibus	Niina Petrokina	Amalia Zelenjak	
Finland	Emmi Peltonen	Jenni Saarinen	Linnea Ceder	
France	Maé-Bérénice Méité	Maïa Mazzara	Léa Serna	
Germany	Nicole Schott	Aya Hatakawa	Kristina Isaev	
(United Kingdom) Great Britain	Natasha McKay	Karly Robertson	Danielle Harrison	
Hungary	Ivett Tóth	Regina Schermann	Bernadett Szigeti	
Israel	Alina Iushchenkova	Nelli Ioffe	Taylor Morris	
Italy	Alessia Tornaghi	Marina Piredda	Lara Naki Gutmann	
Japan	Rika Kihira	Wakaba Higuchi	Tomoe Kawabata	
Latvia	Angelīna Kučvaļska	—N/a		
Lithuania	Aleksandra Golovkina	Elžbieta Kropa	Greta Morkytė	
Netherlands	Niki Wories	Lenne van Gorp	Kyarha van Tiel	
New Zealand	Jojo Hong	Brooke Tamepo	Sarah MacGibbon	
Norway	Silja Anna Skulstad Urang	Kari Sofie Slørdahl Tellefsen	Marianne Stålen	
Poland	Ekaterina Kurakova	Oliwia Rzepiel	Elżbieta Gabryszak	
Romania	Ana Sofia Beşchea	Andreea Uresche	Cristia Calcan	
Russia	Anna Shcherbakova	Alena Kostornaia	Alexandra Trusova	
Serbia	Antonina Dubinina	Leona Rogić	Zona Apostolović	
Slovakia	Ema Doboszová	Claudia Mifkovičová	Bianca Srbecká	
Slovenia	Daša Grm	Maruša Udrih	—N/a	
South Korea	You Young	Lee Hae-in	Kim Ye-lim	
Spain	Valentina Matos Romero	—N/a		
Sweden	Anita Östlund	Josefin Taljegård	Emelie Ling	
Switzerland	Alexia Paganini	Noémie Bodenstein	Yasmine Kimiko Yamada	
Turkey	Sıla Saygı	İlayda Bayar	Sinem Kuyucu	
Ukraine	Anastasiia Shabotova	Taisiya Spesivtseva	Anastasia Gozhva	
United States	Alysa Liu	Mariah Bell	Bradie Tennell	

=== Pairs ===
Pairs
Nation	Gold	Silver	Bronze	Refs
Australia	Ekaterina Alexandrovskaya / Harley Windsor	—N/a		
Austria	Miriam Ziegler / Severin Kiefer	Olivia Faith Boys-Eddy / Livio Mayr	—N/a	
Canada	Kirsten Moore-Towers / Michael Marinaro	Evelyn Walsh / Trennt Michaud	Liubov Ilyushechkina / Charlie Bilodeau	
China	Peng Cheng / Jin Yang	Tang Feiyao / Yang Yongchao	Liu Jiaxi / Xie Zhong	
Croatia	Lana Petranović / Antonio Souza-Kordeiru	—N/a		
Czech Republic	Elizaveta Zhuk / Martin Bidař	—N/a		
France	Cléo Hamon / Denys Strekalin	Camille Mendoza / Pavel Kovalev	Coline Keriven / Noël-Antoine Pierre	
Germany	Minerva Fabienne Hase / Nolan Seegert	Annika Hocke / Robert Kunkel	—N/a	
(United Kingdom) Great Britain	Zoe Jones / Christopher Boyadji	—N/a		
Hungary	Ioulia Chtchetinina / Márk Magyar	—N/a		
Israel	Anna Vernikov / Evgeni Krasnopolski	—N/a		
Italy	Nicole Della Monica / Matteo Guarise	Rebecca Ghilardi / Filippo Ambrosini	Sara Conti / Niccolò Macii	
Japan	Riku Miura / Ryuichi Kihara	—N/a		
Netherlands	Daria Danilova / Michel Tsiba	—N/a		
Russia	Aleksandra Boikova / Dmitrii Kozlovskii	Evgenia Tarasova / Vladimir Morozov	Daria Pavliuchenko / Denis Khodykin	
Spain	Laura Barquero / Tòn Cónsul Vivar	Dorota Broda / Pedro Betegón Martín	—N/a	
Switzerland	Alexandra Herbríková / Nicolas Roulet	—N/a		
Ukraine	Kateryna Dzitsiuk / Ivan Pavlov	Victoria Bychkova / Ivan Khobta	Sofiia Nesterova / Artem Darenskyi	
United States	Alexa Scimeca Knierim / Chris Knierim	Jessica Calalang / Brian Johnson	Tarah Kayne / Danny O'Shea	

=== Ice dance ===
Ice dance
Nation	Gold	Silver	Bronze	Refs
Australia	Holly Harris / Jason Chan	Chantelle Kerry / Andrew Dodds	Matilda Friend / William Badaoui	
Belarus	Yuliia Zhata / Yan Lukouski	Emiliya Kalehanova / Uladzislau Palkhouski	—N/a	
Bulgaria	Mina Zdravkova / Christopher M. Davis	—N/a		
Canada	Piper Gilles / Paul Poirier	Marjorie Lajoie / Zachary Lagha	Carolane Soucisse / Shane Firus	
China	Wang Shiyue / Liu Xinyu	Chen Hong / Sun Zhuoming	Ning Wanqi / Wang Chao	
Denmark	Raffaella Adele Koncius / Rafael Marc Drozd Musil	—N/a		
Finland	Yuka Orihara / Juho Pirinen	Arina Klinovitskaya / Jussiville Partanen	—N/a	
France	Gabriella Papadakis / Guillaume Cizeron	Adelina Galyavieva / Louis Thauron	Evgeniia Lopareva / Geoffrey Brissaud	
Germany	Katharina Müller / Tim Dieck	Jennifer Janse van Rensburg / Benjamin Steffan	Shari Koch / Christian Nüchtern	
(United Kingdom) Great Britain	Lilah Fear / Lewis Gibson	Jessica Marjot / Jan Nordman	Rebecca Clarke / Frank Roselli	
Hungary	Emily Monaghan / Ilias Fourati	Leia Dozzi / Michael Valdez	—N/a	
Italy	Charlène Guignard / Marco Fabbri	Jasmine Tessari / Francesco Fioretti	Katrine Roy / Claudio Pietrantonio	
Japan	Misato Komatsubara / Tim Koleto	Rikako Fukase / Oliver Zhang	Kiria Hirayama / Kenta Ishibashi	
Latvia	Aurelija Ipolito / J.T. Michel	—N/a		
Netherlands	Chelsea Verhaegh / Sherim van Geffen	—N/a		
Poland	Natalia Kaliszek / Maksym Spodyriev	Justyna Plutowska / Jérémie Flemin	Anastasia Polibina / Pavlo Golovishnikov	
Russia	Victoria Sinitsina / Nikita Katsalapov	Alexandra Stepanova / Ivan Bukin	Tiffany Zahorski / Jonathan Guerreiro	
South Korea	Yura Min / Daniel Eaton	—N/a		
Spain	Olivia Smart / Adrián Díaz	Sara Hurtado / Kirill Khaliavin	—N/a	
Switzerland	Victoria Manni / Carlo Röthlisberger	Arianna Wróblewska / Stéphane Walker	—N/a	
Ukraine	Oleksandra Nazarova / Maxim Nikitin	Darya Popova / Volodymyr Byelikov	Mariia Golubtsova / Kyryl Belobrov	
United States	Madison Chock / Evan Bates	Madison Hubbell / Zachary Donohue	Kaitlin Hawayek / Jean-Luc Baker	

== Junior medalists ==
=== Men ===
Junior men
Nation	Gold	Silver	Bronze	Refs
Australia	Juan Camilo Yusti	Callum Bradshaw	Leon McIntosh	
Austria	Alexander Charnagalov	Ralph-Patrick Filipin	Patrik Huber	
Belarus	Alexander Lebedev	Yauhenii Puzanau	Yakau Zenko	
Belgium	Christopher Lison	—N/a		
Bulgaria	Vasil Dimitrov	—N/a		
Canada	Corey Circelli	Wesley Chiu	Alec Guinzbourg	
China	Chen Yudong	Liu Mutong	Dai Dawei	
Chinese Taipei	Fang-Yi Lin	Che Yu Yeh	—N/a	
Croatia	Andrej Galjar	—N/a		
Czech Republic	Filip Ščerba	Matyáš Bělohradský	Georgiy Reshtenko	
Denmark	Lucas Strzelec	—N/a		
Estonia	Aleksandr Selevko	Mihhail Selevko	Arlet Levandi	
Finland	Jan Ollikainen	Makar Suntsev	Matias Lindfors	
France	Adam Siao Him Fa	Yann Frechon	Tom Bouvart	
Germany	Denis Gurdzhi	Nikita Starostin	Louis Weissert	
(United Kingdom) Great Britain	Edward Appleby	Connor Bray	Joseph Zakipour	
Hungary	Mozes-Jozsef Berei	—N/a		
(Republic of Ireland) Ireland	Dillon Judge	—N/a		
Israel	Lev Vinokur	Nikita Kovalenko	Yakov Pogribinski	
Italy	Gabriele Frangipani	Nikolaj Memola	Matteo Nalbone	
Japan	Yuma Kagiyama	Shun Sato	Lucas Tsuyoshi Honda	
Latvia	Daniels Kockers	—N/a		
Lithuania	Andrey Mikhalchuk	—N/a		
Netherlands	Didier Dijkstra	—N/a		
New Zealand	Douglas Gerber	Harrison Bain	Connor McIver	
Poland	Kornel Witkowski	Mikchail Mogilen	Jakub Lofek	
Romania	Andrei Tanase	—N/a		
Russia	Daniil Samsonov	Petr Gumennik	Andrei Mozalev	
Slovenia	David Sedej	—N/a		
South Korea	Jeong Deok-hoon	Lee Jun-hyuk	Kim Hyun-gyeom	
Spain	Pablo García	Arnau Joly Atanasio	Iker Oyarzabal Albas	
Sweden	Andreas Nordebäck	Daniel Seidel	Jonathan Egyptson	
Switzerland	Noah Bodenstein	Matvey Ivanou	Leon Ausperg	
Turkey	Başar Oktar	Alp Töre Ovalıoğlu	—N/a	
Ukraine	Ivan Shmuratko	Andriy Kokura	Kyrylo Lishenko	
United States	Maxim Naumov	Eric Sjoberg	Liam Kapeikis	

=== Ladies ===
Junior ladies
Nation	Gold	Silver	Bronze	Refs
Australia	Victoria Alcântara	Vlada Vasiliev	Amy Avtarovski	
Austria	Olga Mikutina	Stefanie Pesendorfer	Dorotea Partonjic	
Belarus	Milana Ramashova	Anastasiya Balykina	Darya Kapskaya	
Belgium	Nina Pinzarrone	Giulia Castorini	Caroline Smans	
Bulgaria	Maria Levushkina	Ivelina Baycheva	Mariya Ilinova	
Canada	Kaiya Ruiter	Emily Millard	Kristina Ivanova	
China	Jin Hengxin	Xia Xiaoyu	Zhang Yixuan	
Chinese Taipei	Tzu-Han Ting	Mandy Chiang	Marissa Yi-Shan Wu	
Croatia	Hana Kosić	Luce Stipaničev	Lorena Čižmek	
Czech Republic	Thea Reichmacherová	Kateřina Fričová	Klára Štěpánová	
Denmark	Maia Sørensen	Catharina Victoria Petersen	Amalie Borup	
Estonia	Niina Petrokina	Nataly Langerbaur	Jekaterina Rudneva	
Finland	Nella Pelkonen	Olivia Lisko	Janna Jyrkinen	
France	Maïa Mazzara	Océane Piegad	Lorine Schild	
Germany	Nargiz Süleymanova	Aya Hatakawa	Anastasia Steblyanka	
(United Kingdom) Great Britain	Elena Komova	Jasmine Cressey	Molly Robotham	
Hungary	Regina Schermann	Lili Krizsanovszki	Nikolett Albrechtovics	
Iceland	Aldís Kara Bergsdóttir	Viktoría Lind Björnsdóttir	Herdís Birna Hjaltalín Fjoln	
(Republic of Ireland) Ireland	Sophia Tkacheva	Elizabeth Golding	Dracy Condon	
Israel	Mariia Seniuk	Ivetta Berkovich	Viktoria Iuschenkova	
Italy	Ginevra Lavinia Negrello	Carlotta Maria Gardini	Giorgia De Nadai	
Japan	Mana Kawabe	Tomoe Kawabata	Hanna Yoshida	
Latvia	Anete Lāce	Mariia Bolsheva	Anastasija Konga	
Lithuania	Jogailė Aglinskytė	Selina Kaneda	Gabrielė Valentinavičiūtė	
Netherlands	Lindsay van Zundert	Mikai van Ommeren	Dani Loonstra	
New Zealand	Ruth Xu	Dani Gebser	Lelin Wang	
Norway	Frida Turiddotter Berge	Mia Risa Gomez	Oda Tønnesen Havgar	
Poland	Ekaterina Kurakova	Oliwia Rzepiel	Karolina Bialas	
Romania	Ana Sofia Beşchea	Ramona Andreea Voicu	Luiza Elena Ilie	
Russia	Kamila Valieva	Sofia Akatyeva	Daria Usacheva	
Serbia	Ana Šćepanović	Klara Šiljeg	Laura Šiljeg	
Slovenia	Ana Čmer	Manca Krmelj	Lara Hrovat	
South Korea	Seo Hee-won	Song Si-woo	Kang Joo-ha	
Spain	Marian Millares	Lucía Ruíz Manzano	Alba Patiño	
Sweden	Julia Brovall	Emelie Nordqvist	Emma Kivioja	
Switzerland	Kimmy Vivienne Repond	Anna La Porta	Sarina Joos	
Turkey	Güzide Irmak Bayır	Ceren Karaş	Elifsu Erol	
Ukraine	Anastasiia Shabotova	Dariya Kotenko	Mariia Andriichuk	
United States	Lindsay Thorngren	Isabeau Levito	Calista Choi	

=== Pairs ===
Junior pairs
Nation	Gold	Silver	Bronze	Refs
Australia	Campbell Young / Tremayne Bevan	—N/a		
Canada	Patricia Andrew / Zachary Daleman	Gabrielle Levesque / Pier-Alexandre Hudon	Kelly-Ann Laurin / Loucas Éthier	
China	Wang Yuchen / Huang Yihang	Wang Huidi / Jia Ziqi	Li Jiaen / Wang Zijian	
Czech Republic	Lucie Novotná / Mykyta Husakov	—N/a		
France	Cléo Hamon / Denys Strekalin	—N/a		
Germany	Letizia Roscher / Luis Schuster	Josephine Lossius / Niclas Rust	—N/a	
Italy	Alyssa Chiara Montan / Manuel Piazza	Federica Zamponi / Marco Zandron	Giulia Papa / Riccardo Maria Maglio	
Russia	Apollinariia Panfilova / Dmitry Rylov	Kseniia Akhanteva / Valerii Kolesov	Iuliia Artemeva / Mikhail Nazarychev	
Sweden	Greta Crafoord / John Craaford	—N/a		
Ukraine	Violetta Sierova / Ivan Khobta	—N/a		
United States	Kate Finster / Balazs Nagy	Anastasiia Smirnova / Danylo Siianytsia	Winter Deardorff / Mikhail Johnson	

=== Ice dance ===
Junior ice dance
Nation	Gold	Silver	Bronze	Refs
Australia	Alexandra Fladun-Dorling / Christopher Fladun-Dorling	—N/a		
Austria	Marina Philippova / Vadym Kravtsov	Corinna Huber / Patrik Huber	—N/a	
Belarus	Karina Sidorenko / Maksim Elenich	Elizaveta Novik / Oleksandr Kuharevskij	Natalya Pozhivilko / Ilya Drantusov	
Canada	Emmy Bronsard / Aissa Bouaraguia	Nadiia Bashynska / Peter Beaumont	Olivia McIsaac / Corey Circelli	
China	Chen Xizi / Xing Jianing	Lin Yufei / Gao Zijian	Cao Luchang / Chen Jianxu	
Czech Republic	Natálie Taschlerová / Filip Taschler	Denisa Cimlová / Vilém Hlavsa	Elisabeta Kořínková / Tomas Moravec	
Denmark	Sara Buch-Weeke / Nicolas Woodcock	—N/a		
Estonia	Darja Netjaga / Marko Evgeni Gaidajenko	Tatjana Bunina / Ivan Kuznetsov	—N/a	
Finland	Daniela Ivanitskiy / Samu Kyyhkynen	Sanni Rytkönen / Miitri Niskanen	Margareta Poutiainen / Mirko Niskanen	
France	Loïcia Demougeot / Théo Le Mercier	Lou Terreaux / Noé Perron	Célina Fradji / Jean Hans Fourneaux	
Germany	Lara Luft / Stephano Schuster	Anne-Marie Wolf / Max Liebers	Viktoriia Lopusova / Asaf Kazimov	
(United Kingdom) Great Britain	Emily Rose Brown / James Hernandez	Sasha Fear / George Waddell	Lucy Hancock / Billy Wilson French	
Hungary	Villő Marton / Daniil Szemko	Katica Kedves / Fedor Sharonov	Petra Csikos / Patrik Csikos	
Israel	Mariia Nosovitskaya / Mikhail Nosovitskiy	Michaella Sewall / Oleksandr Kolosovsky	—N/a	
Italy	Carolina Portesi Peroni / Michael Chrastecky	Sara Campanini / Francesco Riva	Francesca Righi / Aleksei Dubrovin	
Japan	Utana Yoshida / Shingo Nishiyama	Ayumi Takanami / Yoshimitsu Ikeda	—N/a	
Poland	Oliwia Borowska / Filip Bojanowski	Olivia Oliver / Joshua Andari	—N/a	
Russia	Elizaveta Shanaeva / Devid Naryzhnyy	Arina Ushakova / Maxim Nekrasov	Diana Davis / Gleb Smolkin	
South Korea	Jeon Jeong-eun / Choi Sung-min	—N/a		
Spain	Sofía Val / Linus Colmor Jepsen	Martina Rossi / Adriano Rossi	Maria Pinto / Raul Bermejo	
Switzerland	Gina Zehnder / Beda Leon Sieber	Alina Klein / Maxim Kobelt	Fiona Pernas / Cyrille Vandestoke	
Ukraine	Maria Golubtsova / Kirill Belobrov	Anna Chernyavska / Oleg Muratov	Anastasiya Sammel / Mykyta Pogorelov	
United States	Avonley Nguyen / Vadym Kolesnik	Katarina Wolfkostin / Jeffrey Chen	Oona Brown / Gage Brown	
