= 2019–20 Australian Figure Skating Championships =

Figure skating competition

2019 Australian Figure Skating Championships
- Type: National Championship
- Date: November 30 – December 6
- Season: 2019-2020
- Location: Melbourne, Victoria
- Host: Ice Skating Victoria
- Venue: O'Brien Icehouse

Champions
- Men's singles: Brendan Kerry (S); Juan Camilo Yusti (J)
- Ladies' singles: Kailani Craine (S); Victoria Alcantara (J)
- Pairs: Campbell Young / Tremayne Bevan (J)
- Ice dance: Holly Harris / Jason Chan (S); Alexandra Fladun-Dorling / Christopher Fladun-Dorling (J)
- Synchronized skating: Team Unity (S); Iceskateers Elite (J)
- Previous: 2018 Australian Figure Skating Championships
- Next: 2022 Australian Figure Skating Championships

The 2019 Australian Figure Skating Championships were held from 30 November to 6 December at the O'Brien Icehouse in Melbourne, Victoria. Medals were awarded in the disciplines of men's singles, ladies singles, pair skating, ice dancing and synchronized skating at the senior, junior, advanced novice, intermediate novice, and basic novice level. The results were part of the selection criteria for events including the 2020 Four Continents Championships, 2020 World Junior Championships, and the 2020 World Championships.

== Qualifying ==
Date	Event	Host	Location
23-24 August 2019	Tasmanian State Championships	The Figure Skating Association of Tasmania	Glenorchy
5-7 October 2019	New South Wales State Championships	New South Wales Ice Skating Association	Sydney
12-13 October 2019	Western Australian State Championships	Western Australian Ice Skating Association	Perth
12-13 October 2019	Victorian State Championships	Ice Skating Victoria	Melbourne
16-19 October 2019	Queensland State Championships	Ice Skating Queensland	Brisbane
18-19 October 2019	Australian Capital Territory State Championships	Australian Capital Territory Ice Skating Association	Canberra
19-20 October 2019	South Australian State Championships	South Australian Ice Skating Association	Adelaide

== Medal summary ==
=== Senior level ===
Discipline	Gold	Silver	Bronze
Men	Brendan Kerry	James Min	Darian Kaptich
Women	Kailani Craine	Yancey Chan	Ashley Colliver
Ice dance	Holly Harris / Jason Chan	Chantelle Kerry / Andrew Dodds	Matilda Friend / William Badaoui
Synchronized	Team Unity	Ice Storm	Nova

=== Junior ===
Discipline	Gold	Silver	Bronze
Men	Juan Camilo Yusti	Callum Bradshaw	Leon McIntosh
Women	Victoria Alcantara	Vlada Vasiliev	Amy Avtarovski
Pairs	Campbell Young / Tremayne Bevan	No other competitors	
Ice dance	Alexandra Fladun-Dorling / Christopher Fladun-Dorling	No other competitors	
Synchronized	Iceskateers Elite	Majestic Ice	Adelaide Ice Magic

== Senior results ==
=== Men's singles ===
Rank	Name	Total points	SP		FS	
1	Brendan Kerry	216.11	1	79.28	1	136.83
2	James Min	184.38	2	63.03	2	121.35
3	Darian Kaptich	173.11	4	60.76	3	112.35
4	Andrew Dodds	173.08	3	62.30	4	110.78
5	Jordan Dodds	167.95	5	60.10	5	107.85
6	Charlton Doherty	155.97	6	54.81	6	101.16
7	Brian Lee	122.24	7	44.44	7	77.80

=== Women's singles ===
Rank	Name	Total points	SP		FS	
1	Kailani Craine	157.83	1	53.38	1	104.45
2	Yancey Chan	103.69	2	34.31	2	69.38
3	Ashley Colliver	101.70	3	34.16	3	67.54
4	Romy Grogan	91.58	4	32.89	4	58.69
5	Paris Stephens	87.45	5	30.05	5	57.40
6	Arielle Jennings	85.21	6	28.45	6	56.76
7	Lucy Sori Yun	81.01	7	26.74	7	54.27
8	Sarah Cullen	73.13	9	23.66	8	49.47
9	Jennifer Toms	70.94	8	24.72	9	46.22

=== Ice dance ===
Rank	Name	Total points	SP		FD	
1	Holly Harris / Jason Chan	156.76	1	63.31	1	93.45
2	Chantelle Kerry / Andrew Dodds	140.17	3	48.24	2	91.93
3	Matilda Friend / William Badaoui	138.47	2	49.77	3	88.70
4	India Nette / Eron Westwood	96.00	4	37.13	4	58.87

=== Synchronized skating ===
Rank	Name	Total points	SP		FS	
1	Team Unity	128.88	1	45.41	1	83.47
2	Ice Storm	114.72	2	35.13	2	79.59
3	Nova	101.92	3	31.58	3	70.34
4	Infusion	198.51	4	29.29	4	69.22

== Junior results ==
=== Men's singles ===
Rank	Name	Total points	SP		FS	
1	Juan Camilo Yusti	118.42	1	45.11	2	73.31
2	Callum Bradshaw	112.96	2	39.49	1	73.47
3	Leon McIntosh	108.67	3	37.46	3	71.21
4	Andy Yao	100.94	5	34.78	4	66.16
5	Yu Sun	100.93	4	34.81	5	66.12

=== Women's singles ===
Rank	Name	Total points	SP		FS	
1	Victoria Alcantara	130.84	1	49.36	1	81.48
2	Vlada Vasiliev	116.93	5	36.24	2	80.69
3	Amy Avtarovski	112.57	3	39.06	3	73.51
4	Cailin O'Keefe	108.44	6	36.17	4	72.27
5	Shanie Sime	105.06	2	40.35	6	64.71
6	Angela Yang	102.20	4	37.29	5	64.91
7	Sarah Batey	99.83	7	36.17	7	63.66
8	Alara Su Ulker	97.02	8	34.14	8	62.88
9	Ruth Xu	94.75	12	31.94	9	62.81
10	Mary-Anne Chen	94.65	9	34.01	10	60.64
11	Tegan Wright	92.35	11	32.70	11	59.65
12	Amelie Tabor	88.05	13	31.63	13	56.42
13	Emma Dobson	87.60	14	30.82	12	56.78
14	Merryn O'Keefe	84.81	16	29.06	14	55.75
15	Corina Ormston	84.81	16	33.64	14	51.17
16	Hannah Sime	77.70	17	28.98	18	48.72
17	Jessica Rotondo	77.55	21	22.97	15	54.58
18	Simone Aubrecht	76.70	19	26.68	17	50.02
19	Sarah Cull	73.95	15	30.50	21	43.46
20	Meg Rafinian	73.40	18	27.05	19	46.35
21	Eliza Hall	69.61	20	25.84	20	43.77

=== Pairs ===
Rank	Name	Total points	SP		FS	
1	Campbell Young / Tremayne Bevan	87.26	1	31.29	1	55.97

=== Ice dance ===
Rank	Name	Total points	SP		FD	
1	Alexandra Fladun-Dorling / Christopher Fladun-Dorling	57.99	1	23.51	1	34.48

=== Synchronized skating ===
Rank	Name	Total points	SP		FS	
1	Iceskateers Elite	98.48	1	34.56	1	63.92
2	Majestic Ice	93.75	2	30.38	2	63.37
3	Adelaide Ice Magic	80.63	3	25.86	3	54.77
4	Infusion	73.10	4	24.05	4	49.05
5	Southern Sky	67.55	5	22.05	5	45.50
6	Eclipse	65.86	6	21.12	6	44.74

== International team selections for 2020 ISU Championships ==
=== World Championships ===
Men	Ladies	Pairs	Ice dancing

=== Junior World Championships ===
Men	Ladies	Pairs	Ice dancing

=== World Synchronized Skating Championships ===
Synchronized Skating
Team Unity

=== World Junior Synchronized Skating Championships ===
Synchronized Skating
Iceskateers Elite

=== Four Continents ===
Men	Ladies	Pairs	Ice dancing
Brendan Kerry; James Min; Jordan Dodds	Kailani Craine	Ekaterina Alexandrovskaya / Harley Windsor	Holly Harris / Jason Chan; Chantelle Kerry / Andrew Dodds; Matila Friend / William Badaoui
