= 2020 British Figure Skating Championships =

Figure skating competition

- Type: National championship
- Date: 26 November – 1 December 2019
- Season: 2019-20
- Location: Sheffield
- Host: British Ice Skating
- Venue: iceSheffield

Champions
- Men's singles: Peter James Hallam (S); Edward Appleby (J)
- Ladies' singles: Natasha McKay (S); Elena Komova (J)
- Pairs: Zoe Jones / Christopher Boyadji (S)
- Ice dance: Lilah Fear / Lewis Gibson (S); Emily Rose Brown / James Hernandez (J)
- Previous: 2019 British Championships
- Next: 2021 British Championships

The 2020 British Figure Skating Championships were held from 26 November to 1 December 2019 at the IceSheffield in Sheffield. BBC Sport provided live coverage throughout the competition. Medals were awarded in the disciplines of men's singles, ladies' singles, pair skating, and ice dance at the senior, junior, and novice levels. The results were among the criteria used to determine international assignments.

== Medalists ==
=== Senior ===
| Discipline | Gold | Silver | Bronze |
|---|---|---|---|
| Men | Peter James Hallam | Graham Newberry | Harry Mattick |
| Ladies | Natasha McKay | Karly Robertson | Danielle Harrison |
| Pairs | Zoe Jones / Christopher Boyadji | No other competitors | |
| Ice dance | Lilah Fear / Lewis Gibson | Jessica Marjot / Jan Nordman | Rebecca Clarke / Frank Roselli |

=== Junior ===
| Discipline | Gold | Silver | Bronze |
|---|---|---|---|
| Men | Edward Appleby | Connor Bray | Joseph Zakipour |
| Ladies | Elena Komova | Jasmine Cressey | Molly Robotham |
| Ice dance | Emily Rose Brown / James Hernandez | Sasha Fear / George Waddell | Lucy Hancock / Billy Wilson French |

== Senior results ==
=== Men ===
| Rank | Name | Total points | SP | | FS | |
|---|---|---|---|---|---|---|
| 1 | Peter James Hallam | 218.24 | 1 | 77.73 | 1 | 140.51 |
| 2 | Graham Newberry | 187.19 | 2 | 71.31 | 2 | 115.88 |
| 3 | Harry Mattick | 157.22 | 3 | 51.94 | 3 | 105.28 |
| 4 | Elliott Thompson | 127.74 | 4 | 46.30 | 4 | 81.44 |

=== Ladies ===
| Rank | Name | Total points | SP | | FS | |
|---|---|---|---|---|---|---|
| 1 | Natasha McKay | 173.77 | 1 | 60.09 | 1 | 113.68 |
| 2 | Karly Robertson | 161.08 | 2 | 59.28 | 2 | 101.80 |
| 3 | Danielle Harrison | 147.36 | 3 | 52.35 | 3 | 95.01 |
| 4 | Nina Povey | 136.54 | 4 | 47.56 | 5 | 88.98 |
| 5 | Bethany Powell | 134.85 | 5 | 44.37 | 4 | 90.48 |
| 6 | Katie Powell | 129.31 | 6 | 43.43 | 6 | 85.88 |

=== Pairs ===
| Rank | Name | Total points | SP | | FS | |
|---|---|---|---|---|---|---|
| 1 | Zoe Jones / Christopher Boyadji | 144.58 | 1 | 48.83 | 1 | 95.75 |

=== Ice dance ===
| Rank | Name | Total points | RD | | FD | |
|---|---|---|---|---|---|---|
| 1 | Lilah Fear / Lewis Gibson | 195.70 | 1 | 70.37 | 1 | 125.33 |
| 2 | Jessica Marjot / Jan Nordman | 122.33 | 3 | 45.63 | 2 | 76.70 |
| 3 | Rebecca Clarke / Frank Roselli | 117.81 | 2 | 47.29 | 3 | 70.52 |
| 4 | Jodie Russell / Adam Freedman | 79.06 | 4 | 33.44 | 4 | 45.62 |

== Junior results ==
=== Men ===
| Rank | Name | Total points | SP | | FS | |
|---|---|---|---|---|---|---|
| 1 | Edward Appleby | 171.00 | 1 | 56.62 | 1 | 114.38 |
| 2 | Connor Bray | 126.22 | 2 | 47.36 | 3 | 78.86 |
| 3 | Joseph Zakipour | 124.55 | 4 | 41.64 | 2 | 82.91 |
| 4 | Ken Fitterer | 110.11 | 3 | 45.73 | 6 | 64.38 |
| 5 | Elliot Appleby | 105.91 | 5 | 35.33 | 4 | 70.58 |
| 6 | Brandon Bailey | 99.81 | 6 | 33.72 | 5 | 66.09 |

=== Ladies ===
| Rank | Name | Total points | SP | | FS | |
|---|---|---|---|---|---|---|
| 1 | Elena Komova | 120.73 | 1 | 42.60 | 1 | 78.13 |
| 2 | Jasmine Cressey | 113.56 | 2 | 41.46 | 4 | 72.10 |
| 3 | Molly Robotham | 112.44 | 7 | 37.35 | 2 | 75.09 |
| 4 | Rebecca Gillespie | 109.53 | 6 | 37.39 | 3 | 72.14 |
| 5 | Genevieve Somerville | 107.86 | 3 | 41.27 | 6 | 66.59 |
| 6 | Avery Wieczorek | 107.43 | 4 | 39.57 | 5 | 67.86 |
| 7 | Christie Anne Shannon | 99.04 | 8 | 36.54 | 7 | 62.50 |
| 8 | Angelica Volkov | 98.10 | 5 | 38.26 | 11 | 59.84 |
| 9 | Halah Thomas | 97.54 | 9 | 35.41 | 8 | 62.13 |
| 10 | Elé Silvester | 96.14 | 10 | 35.25 | 10 | 60.89 |
| 11 | Eleanor Hayes | 94.48 | 11 | 33.42 | 9 | 61.06 |
| 12 | Kayla Fry | 91.43 | 12 | 33.12 | 12 | 58.31 |
| 13 | Natasha Gadsdon | 87.11 | 14 | 30.39 | 13 | 56.72 |
| 14 | Chloe Dempsie | 80.34 | 17 | 29.53 | 15 | 50.81 |
| 15 | Megan Morley | 77.99 | 18 | 23.94 | 14 | 54.05 |
| 16 | Ashelen Lund Course | 77.80 | 13 | 30.43 | 16 | 47.37 |
| 17 | Ruby Boyd | 77.07 | 16 | 29.87 | 17 | 47.20 |
| 18 | Zharia Horne | 72.28 | 15 | 30.04 | 18 | 42.24 |

=== Ice dance ===
| Rank | Name | Total points | RD | | FD | |
|---|---|---|---|---|---|---|
| 1 | Emily Rose Brown / James Hernandez | 153.94 | 1 | 60.78 | 1 | 93.16 |
| 2 | Sasha Fear / George Waddell | 149.67 | 2 | 57.29 | 2 | 92.38 |
| 3 | Lucy Hancock / Billy Wilson French | 117.89 | 3 | 48.67 | 4 | 69.22 |
| 4 | Erin Gilles / Joshua Tarry | 112.35 | 4 | 42.69 | 3 | 69.66 |
| 5 | Phebe Bekker / Theodore Alexander | 93.41 | 7 | 30.86 | 5 | 62.55 |
| 6 | Brienne Reher / Christopher Bland | 89.73 | 5 | 33.30 | 6 | 56.43 |
| 7 | Natalie Nicoll / Peter Nicoll | 86.41 | 6 | 30.94 | 7 | 55.47 |
| 8 | Vasilisa Ahramenka / Alessio Surenkov-Gultchev | 81.89 | 8 | 29.98 | 8 | 51.91 |

== International team selections ==
=== World Championships ===
The 2020 World Championships were scheduled to be held in Montreal, Quebec, Canada from 16 to 22 March 2020. However, the competition was cancelled due to the COVID-19 pandemic.

| | Men | Ladies | Pairs | Ice dance |
|---|---|---|---|---|
| 1 | Peter James Hallam | Natasha McKay | Zoe Jones / Christopher Boyadji | Lilah Fear / Lewis Gibson |
| 1st alt. | | Karly Robertson | | Robynne Tweedale / Joseph Buckland |

=== European Championships ===
The 2020 European Championships were held in Graz, Austria from 20 to 26 January 2020.

| | Men | Ladies | Pairs | Ice dance |
|---|---|---|---|---|
| 1 | Peter James Hallam | Natasha McKay | Zoe Jones / Christopher Boyadji | Lilah Fear / Lewis Gibson |
| 2 | | | | Robynne Tweedale / Joseph Buckland |
| 1st alt. | Graham Newberry | Karly Robertson | | Rebecca Clarke / Frank Roselli |

=== World Junior Championships ===
The 2020 World Junior Championships were held in Tallinn, Estonia from 2–8 March 2020.

| | Men | Ladies | Ice dance |
|---|---|---|---|
| 1 | Edward Appleby | Elena Komova | Emily Rose Brown / James Hernandez |
| 1st alt. | | | Sasha Fear / George Waddell |
