= An Xiangyi =

Chinese figure skater (born 2006)

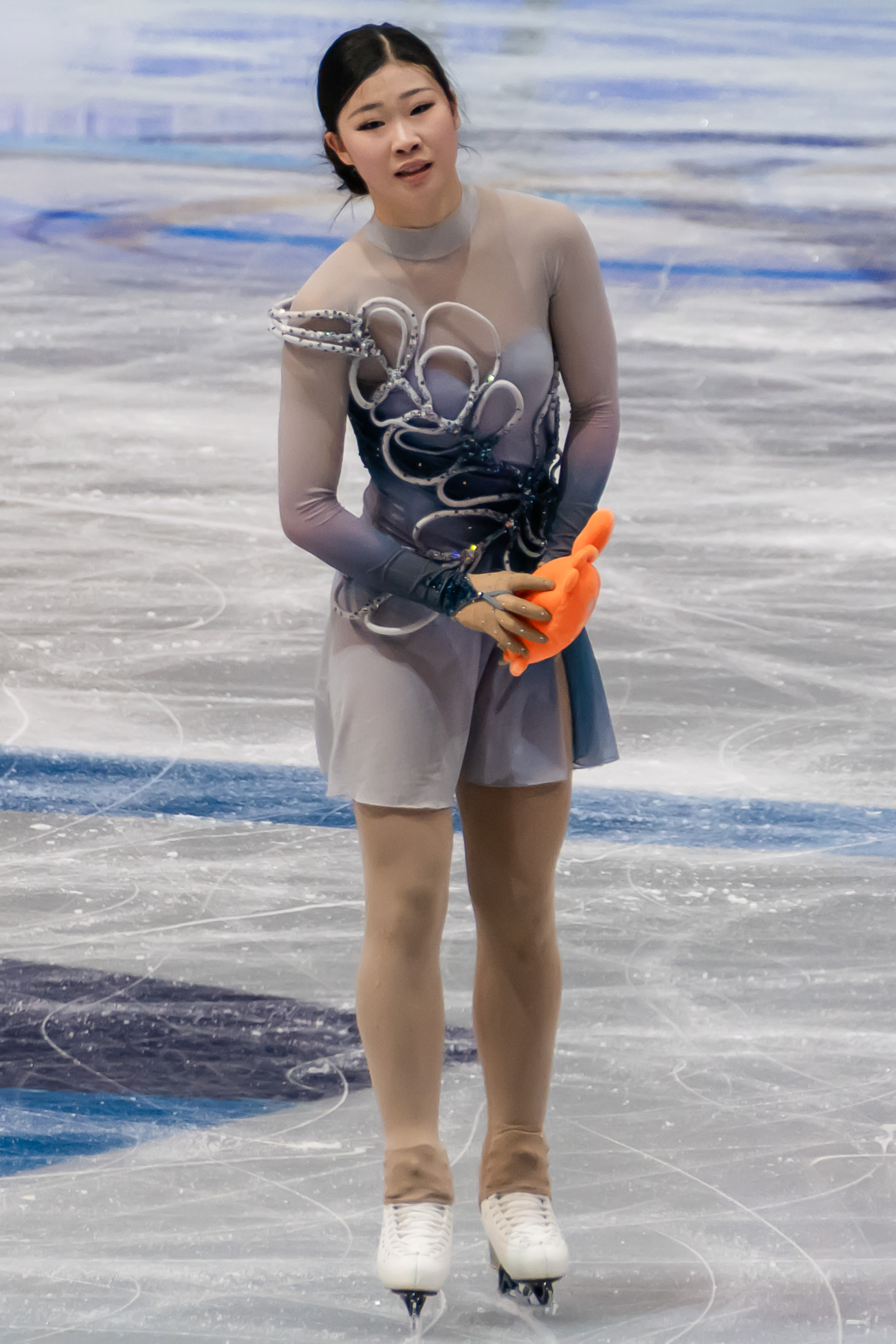
- An at the 2025 World Championships

Personal information
- Native name: 安香怡 (Chinese)
- Other names: Nini
- Born: 24 December 2006 (age 19) Beijing, China
- Home town: Beijing, China
- Height: 1.64 m (5 ft 4 1/2 in)

Figure skating career
- Country: China
- Discipline: Women's singles
- Coach: An Longhe
- Skating club: Beijing New Century Star
- Began skating: 2009
Chinese Championships
Gold medal – first place	2020 Changchun	Singles
Gold medal – first place	2022 Chengde	Singles
Silver medal – second place	2019 Harbin	Singles

An Xiangyi
- Simplified Chinese: 安香怡
- Traditional Chinese: 安香怡
Transcriptions
Standard Mandarin
- Hanyu Pinyin: An Xiāngyí

Chinese Korean name
- Chosŏn'gŭl: 안향이
Transcriptions
- Revised Romanization: An Hyangi
- McCune–Reischauer: An Hyangi

An Xiangyi (Chinese: 安香怡; pinyin: An Xiāngyí; born 24 December 2006) is a Chinese figure skater. She is a two-time Asian trophy champion (2023 and 2024) and a two-time (2020 and 2022) national champion.

== Personal life ==
An was born on 24 December 2006, in Beijing, China to parents, An Longhe and Zhang Aijun. She was originally supposed to be named An Yibing, but Zhang changed her name to be similar to that of champion skaters such as Yuka Sato and Shizuka Arakawa. An is often nicknamed "Nini" by friends and skating fans.

In addition to figure skating, An also practices various forms of dance as well as rhythmic gymnastics, the latter which she says helps with her figure skating by increasing her flexibility. Due to time spent alternating between practicing and resting, An was homeschooled. An eventually became a student at Beijing 101 Middle School. As hobbies, she enjoys cooking and painting, and is her own nutritionist. She also has three pet cats.

As An's mother is buddhist and taught her buddhist concepts, An likens her continued personal development to sadhana.

An has named American women's singles skater, Amber Glenn, as an inspiration to her due to Glenn remaining competitive with the top skaters in the world while in her mid- to late- twenties.

== Career ==
=== Early years ===
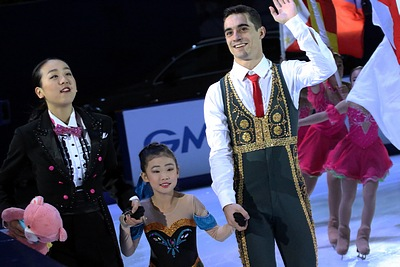
An with Mao Asada and Javier Fernández at the 2015 Cup of China

An began figure skating in 2009 at the age of three. Since starting, she has been coached by her father, An Longhe, a former competitive figure skater.

An was the 2019 Asian Open advanced novice champion. Due to the COVID-19 pandemic, all Chinese national competitions were canceled during the 2020–21 season, thus An could not partake in major competitions. During the 2021–22 season, several coronavirus outbreaks and COVID-19 protocols in China caused the 2021 National Figure Skating Grand Prix and China Figure Skating Club League Finals to be held virtually. An would go on to win the gold medal at the event.

=== 2022–2023 season: Junior international debut ===
An made her Junior Grand Prix debut at the 2022 Solidarity Cup, after scoring first in national qualification events. She finished fifth at the event.

After contracting COVID-19 and having had a recurrence of injuries, An withdrew from the 2022 Chinese Figure Skating Junior Championships and the 2022 Chinese Figure Skating Club League Finals. However, she later competed in the 2023 Chinese Championships, ranking first in the short program by a small 1.73 mark lead after falling on her triple toe-triple toe combination, and winning the free skate by 15.83 marks, ahead of Li Ruotang.

In March, An was assigned to the 2023 World Junior Figure Championships in Calgary, where she ranked fifth in the short program. In the free skate, she stepped out of one jump and had quarter underrotation calls on three others, ranking eighth in that segment but finishing sixth overall. She became the first Chinese woman to place in the top ten since Li Zijun in 2012.

=== 2023–2024 season: Senior international debut ===
An began the season by winning gold at the 2023 Asian Open Trophy and went on to finish fifth at the 2023 Shanghai Trophy.

Prior to debuting on the 2023–24 Grand Prix series, An had longtime choreographer, Benoît Richaud, create a new free program, different from the one that she had initially intended to skate to. Competing at 2023 Skate America, An finished ninth. At the 2023 Cup of China, An debuted a new short program, finishing sixth in that segment of the competition, but dropping to eleventh overall after placing eleventh in the free skate segment.

An opted to sit out of the 2024 Chinese Championships. She did, however, compete at the 2024 National Winter Games, where she won gold in the team event and silver in the individual event.

=== 2024–2025 season ===
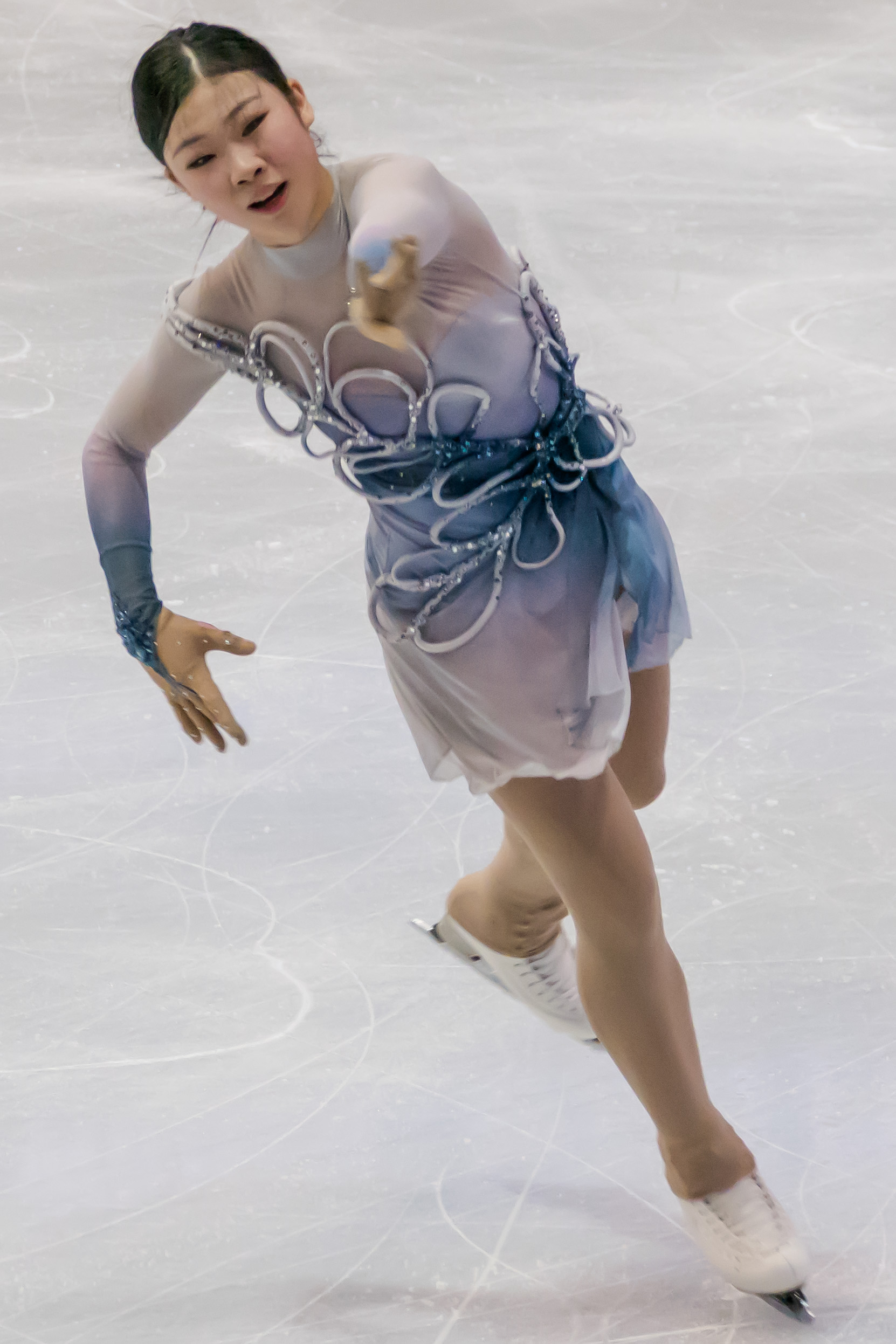
An performing her short program at the 2025 World Championships

An began her international season by winning gold at the 2024 Asian Open Trophy. She then went on to finish fifth at the 2024 Shanghai Trophy and tenth at the 2024 Cup of China. One week following the latter event, An finished fifth at the 2025 Chinese Championships.

In February, An competed at the 2025 Asian Winter Games in Harbin, where she finished in sixth place. One week following that event, she placed thirteenth at the 2025 Four Continents Championships in Seoul, South Korea.

Selected to compete at the 2025 World Championships in Boston, Massachusetts, United States, An placed twenty-seventh in the short program and did not advance to the free skate segment.

=== 2025–2026 season ===
Although assigned to compete at the 2025 Cup of China, An withdrew from the event due to a lower back injury. She returned to competition for the 2026 Chinese Championships in December, where she finished in tenth place.

Assigned to compete at the 2026 Four Continents Championships, An finished the event in sixteenth place after placing sixteenth in both the short and free program segments.

== Programs ==
Season	Short program	Free skating	Exhibition
2026–2027	Bohémienne (from Notre-Dame de Paris) by Luc Plamondon & Riccardo Cocciante performed by Hélène Ségara choreo. by An Xiangyi	Silent Friend arranged by Karl Hugo; Valse de l'eau by Jordan Critz; Gymnopédie No. 1 by Erik Satie performed by MAKSIM; Beauté by Jordan Critz choreo. by Ivan Righini	
2025–2026	Making Music by Zakir Hussain; Asteromata by Arcade & Klavdia choreo. by Shin Yea-ji	Défilé 1962 (from Yves Saint Laurent) by Ibrahim Maalouf; Original Composition; Au fil du temps by Karl Hugo choreo. by Ivan Righini	
2024–2025	Voilà by Barbara Pravi arranged by Cédric Tour choreo. by Benoît Richaud	Lara (from Lara) by Arash Safaian & Alice Sara Ott; Sanctus Petrus et Sancta Maria Magdalena: Mea tormenta properate by Johann Adolph Hasse choreo. by Benoît Richaud; Curse of the Golden Flower by Shigeru Umebayashi choreo. by Shin Yea-ji	Moonlight Sonata by Ludwig van Beethoven
2023–2024	Voilà by Barbara Pravi arranged by Cédric Tour choreo. by Benoît Richaud; Femme Fatale by Compilation - Studio Unisons choreo. Benoît Richaud	Lara (from Lara) by Arash Safaian & Alice Sara Ott; Sanctus Petrus et Sancta Maria Magdalena: Mea tormenta properate by Johann Adolph Hasse choreo. by Benoît Richaud; Curse of the Golden Flower by Shigeru Umebayashi choreo. Shin Yea-ji	Giselle by Adolphe Adam choreo. by Benoît Richaud
2022–2023	Send In the Clowns (from A Little Night Music) by Stephen Sondheim performed by Susan Boyle choreo. by Benoît Richaud	Camping (from The Theory of Everything) by Jóhann Jóhannsson; Song for the Little Sparrow by Abel Korzeniowski performed by Patricia Kaas choreo. by Benoît Richaud	Giselle by Adolphe Adam choreo. by Benoît Richaud
2019–2020	Opportunity (from Annie) performed by Quvenzhané Wallis choreo. by Benoît Richaud	First Embrace by Peter Kater, Tina Guo; Wait For Me by Luca D'Alberto choreo. by Benoît Richaud	I'm In Here by Sia choreo. by Benoît Richaud
2018–2019	Tango D'Amor by Tango Jointz; La Bohemia by Jimena Fama choreo. by Benoît Richaud; Cello Suites by Johann Bach performed by The Piano Guys choreo. by Benoît Richaud	Leningrad by William Joseph; Experience by Ludovico Einaudi choreo. by Benoît Richaud; Lord of the Rings by Howard Shore performed by The Piano Guys; May It Be (from The Fellowship of the Ring) by Enya and Roma Ryan choreo. by Benoît Richaud	
2017–2018	Amélie by Yann Tiersen	Fix You by Coldplay	Amélie by Yann Tiersen

== Competitive highlights ==
- GP – Event of the ISU Grand Prix Series
- JGP – Event of the ISU Junior Grand Prix Series
- TBD – Assigned
- WD – Withdrew
- Medals at team events are awarded for the team results only. Individual placements at team events are listed in parentheses.

Competition placements at senior level
Season	2017–18	2018–19	2019–20	2022–23	2023–24	2024–25	2025–26
World Championships						27th	
Four Continents Championships						13th	16th
Chinese Championships	4th	2nd	1st	1st	WD	5th	10th
GP Cup of China					11th	10th	
GP Skate America					9th		
Asian Open Trophy					1st	1st	
Asian Winter Games						6th	
National Winter Games					2nd		
National Winter Games (Team event)					1st (1st)		
Shanghai Trophy					5th	5th	

Competition placements at junior level
Season	2022–23
World Junior Championships	6th
JGP Poland I	5th

== Detailed results ==
ISU personal best scores in the +5/-5 GOE System
Segment	Type	Score	Event
Total	TSS	183.94	2023 World Junior Championships
Short program	TSS	65.40	2022 JGP Poland I
Short program	TES	37.09	2022 JGP Poland I
Short program	PCS	28.31	2022 JGP Poland I
Free skating	TSS	120.03	2023 World Junior Championships
Free skating	TES	60.03	2023 World Junior Championships
Free skating	PCS	60.00	2023 World Junior Championships

=== Senior level ===
Results in the 2017–18 season
Date	Event	SP		FS		Total	
Date	Event	P	Score	P	Score	P	Score
Dec 23–24, 2017	(China) 2018 Chinese Championships	4	52.40	6	86.76	4	139.16

Results in the 2018–19 season
Date	Event	SP		FS		Total	
Date	Event	P	Score	P	Score	P	Score
Dec 19–20, 2018	(China) 2019 Chinese Championships	1	66.92	2	113.69	2	180.61

Results in the 2019–20 season
Date	Event	SP		FS		Total	
Date	Event	P	Score	P	Score	P	Score
Sep 10–15, 2019	(China) 2020 Chinese Championships	1	66.50	1	131.43	1	197.93

Results in the 2022–23 season
Date	Event	SP		FS		Total	
Date	Event	P	Score	P	Score	P	Score
Dec 25–31, 2022	(China) 2023 Chinese Championships	1	61.32	1	128.49	1	189.81

Results in the 2023–24 season
Date	Event	SP		FS		Total	
Date	Event	P	Score	P	Score	P	Score
Aug 16–19, 2023	(Thailand) 2023 Asian Open Trophy	1	58.70	1	102.28	1	160.98
Oct 3–5, 2023	(China) 2023 Shanghai Trophy	5	50.99	5	105.71	5	156.70
Oct 20–22, 2023	(United States) 2023 Skate America	8	59.74	9	105.66	9	165.40
Nov 10–12, 2023	2023 Cup of China	6	61.86	11	90.50	11	152.36
Feb 21–22, 2024	(China) 14th Chinese National Winter Games (Team event)	1	64.52	1	—N/a	1	—N/a
Feb 25–26, 2024	(China) 14th Chinese National Winter Games	1	65.45	3	116.25	2	181.70

Results in the 2024–25 season
Date	Event	SP		FS		Total	
Date	Event	P	Score	P	Score	P	Score
Sep 2–6, 2024	(Hong Kong) 2025 Asian Open Trophy	1	64.61	2	122.84	1	187.45
Oct 3–5, 2024	(China) 2024 Shanghai Trophy	5	56.25	5	101.81	5	158.06
Nov 22–24, 2024	2024 Cup of China	9	60.10	10	103.64	10	163.74
Nov 28 – Dec 1, 2024	(China) 2025 Chinese Championships	4	61.35	6	115.04	5	176.39
Feb 11–13, 2025	(China) 2025 Asian Winter Games	5	62.96	8	98.75	6	161.71
Feb 18–23, 2025	(South Korea) 2025 Four Continents Championships	12	57.63	13	106.29	13	163.92
Mar 24–30, 2025	(United States) 2025 World Championships	27	47.52	—N/a	—N/a	27	47.52

Results in the 2025–26 season
Date	Event	SP		FS		Total	
Date	Event	P	Score	P	Score	P	Score
Dec 25–28, 2025	(China) 2026 Chinese Championships	14	53.22	10	111.32	10	164.54
Jan 21–25, 2026	(China) 2026 Four Continents Championships	16	49.77	16	90.89	16	140.66

=== Junior level ===
Results in the 2022–23 season
Date	Event	SP		FS		Total	
Date	Event	P	Score	P	Score	P	Score
Sep 28 – Oct 1, 2022	2022 JGP Poland I	4	65.40	8	113.91	5	179.31
Feb 27 – Mar 5, 2023	(Canada) 2023 World Junior Championships	5	63.91	8	120.03	6	183.94
