= 2019 Skate Canada International =

Figure skating competition

- Type: Grand Prix
- Date: October 25 – 27
- Season: 2019–20
- Location: Kelowna, British Columbia
- Host: Skate Canada
- Venue: Prospera Place

Champions
- Men's singles: (Japan) Yuzuru Hanyu
- Ladies' singles: (Russia) Alexandra Trusova
- Pairs: (Russia) Aleksandra Boikova / Dmitrii Kozlovskii
- Ice dance: (Canada) Piper Gilles / Paul Poirier
- Previous: 2018 Skate Canada International
- Next: 2020 Skate Canada International
- Previous Grand Prix: 2019 Skate America
- Next Grand Prix: 2019 Internationaux de France

The 2019 Skate Canada International was the second event of the 2019–20 ISU Grand Prix of Figure Skating, a senior-level international invitational competition series. It was held at Prospera Place in Kelowna, British Columbia from October 25 to 27. Medals were awarded in the disciplines of men's singles, ladies' singles, pair skating, and ice dance. Skaters earned points toward qualifying for the 2019–20 Grand Prix Final.

== Entries ==
The ISU announced the preliminary assignments on June 20, 2019.

Country	Men	Ladies	Pairs	Ice dance
Australia	Brendan Kerry			
Canada	Nicolas Nadeau; Nam Nguyen; Roman Sadovsky	Gabrielle Daleman; Véronik Mallet; Alicia Pineault	Liubov Ilyushechkina / Charlie Bilodeau; Kirsten Moore-Towers / Michael Marinaro; Evelyn Walsh / Trennt Michaud	Piper Gilles / Paul Poirier; Marjorie Lajoie / Zachary Lagha; Haley Sales / Nikolas Wamsteeker
China			Tang Feiyao / Yang Yongchao	
Germany	Paul Fentz			
Great Britain				Lilah Fear / Lewis Gibson
Italy	Matteo Rizzo			
Japan	Yuzuru Hanyu; Keiji Tanaka	Marin Honda; Rika Kihira		
Latvia	Deniss Vasiļjevs			
Malaysia	Julian Zhi Jie Yee			
Russia	Andrei Lazukin	Evgenia Medvedeva; Serafima Sakhanovich; Alexandra Trusova	Aleksandra Boikova / Dmitrii Kozlovskii; Evgenia Tarasova / Vladimir Morozov	Sofia Evdokimova / Egor Bazin; Betina Popova / Sergey Mozgov
South Korea		Kim Ye-lim; You Young		
Spain				Sara Hurtado / Kirill Khaliavin
Switzerland		Alexia Paganini		
United States	Camden Pulkinen	Bradie Tennell	Jessica Calalang / Brian Johnson; Alexa Scimeca Knierim / Chris Knierim	Caroline Green / Michael Parsons; Kaitlin Hawayek / Jean-Luc Baker; Madison Hubbell / Zachary Donohue

=== Changes to preliminary assignments ===
Discipline	Withdrew		Added		Notes	Ref.
Discipline	Date	Skater(s)	Date	Skater(s)	Notes	Ref.
Ladies	—		September 17	(Canada) Alicia Pineault	Host picks	
Pairs	—		September 17	(Canada) Evelyn Walsh / Trennt Michaud	Host picks	
Men	October 2	(Russia) Mikhail Kolyada	October 9	(Malaysia) Julian Zhi Jie Yee	Surgery	
Ladies	October 3	(Japan) Mai Mihara	October 7	(Japan) Marin Honda	Health	
Ladies	October 21	(Canada) Aurora Cotop	October 21	(Canada) Véronik Mallet	Injury	

== Records ==
The following new ISU best scores were set during this competition:

Disc.	Segment	Skater	Score	Date	Ref.
Ladies' singles	Free skating	(Russia) Alexandra Trusova	166.62	October 26, 2019	
Ladies' singles	Combined total	(Russia) Alexandra Trusova	241.02	October 26, 2019	

== Results ==
=== Men ===
Rank	Skater	Nation	Total points	SP		FS	
1	Yuzuru Hanyu	Japan	322.59	1	109.60	1	212.99
2	Nam Nguyen	Canada	262.77	3	84.08	2	178.69
3	Keiji Tanaka	Japan	250.02	5	80.11	3	169.91
4	Camden Pulkinen	United States	244.78	2	89.05	4	155.73
5	Deniss Vasiļjevs	Latvia	227.40	4	84.01	7	143.39
6	Matteo Rizzo	Italy	223.78	9	70.12	5	153.66
7	Nicolas Nadeau	Canada	222.33	8	75.22	6	147.11
8	Andrei Lazukin	Russia	212.07	6	78.99	12	133.08
9	Julian Zhi Jie Yee	Malaysia	211.63	7	75.64	10	135.99
10	Roman Sadovsky	Canada	204.35	11	65.29	8	139.06
11	Paul Fentz	Germany	202.24	10	66.32	11	135.92
12	Brendan Kerry	Australia	193.77	12	56.75	9	137.02

=== Ladies ===
Rank	Skater	Nation	Total points	SP		FS	
1	Alexandra Trusova	Russia	241.02 WR	3	74.40	1	166.62 WR
2	Rika Kihira	Japan	230.33	1	81.35	2	148.98
3	You Young	South Korea	217.49	2	78.22	4	139.27
4	Bradie Tennell	United States	211.31	4	72.92	5	138.39
5	Evgenia Medvedeva	Russia	209.62	6	62.89	3	146.73
6	Marin Honda	Japan	179.26	10	59.20	6	120.06
7	Kim Ye-lim	South Korea	176.93	8	61.23	7	115.70
8	Serafima Sakhanovich	Russia	175.97	7	62.63	8	113.34
9	Alexia Paganini	Switzerland	166.20	9	60.68	9	105.52
10	Gabrielle Daleman	Canada	164.34	5	63.94	11	100.40
11	Alicia Pineault	Canada	161.37	11	57.59	10	103.78
12	Véronik Mallet	Canada	147.79	12	51.90	12	95.89

=== Pairs ===
Rank	Team	Nation	Total points	SP		FS	
1	Aleksandra Boikova / Dmitrii Kozlovskii	Russia	216.71	1	76.45	1	140.26
2	Kirsten Moore-Towers / Michael Marinaro	Canada	208.49	2	75.50	2	132.99
3	Evgenia Tarasova / Vladimir Morozov	Russia	202.29	3	73.57	3	128.72
4	Alexa Scimeca Knierim / Chris Knierim	United States	199.57	4	71.28	4	128.29
5	Liubov Ilyushechkina / Charlie Bilodeau	Canada	192.47	5	68.62	5	123.85
6	Jessica Calalang / Brian Johnson	United States	181.54	6	62.54	6	119.00
7	Tang Feiyao / Yang Yongchao	China	170.57	7	62.35	8	108.22
8	Evelyn Walsh / Trennt Michaud	Canada	164.66	8	56.09	7	108.57

=== Ice dance ===
Rank	Team	Nation	Total points	RD		FD	
1	Piper Gilles / Paul Poirier	Canada	209.01	2	82.58	1	126.43
2	Madison Hubbell / Zachary Donohue	United States	206.31	1	83.21	2	123.10
3	Lilah Fear / Lewis Gibson	United Kingdom	195.35	4	76.67	3	118.68
4	Kaitlin Hawayek / Jean-Luc Baker	United States	194.77	3	79.52	4	115.25
5	Sara Hurtado / Kirill Khaliavin	Spain	180.64	5	72.77	5	107.87
6	Marjorie Lajoie / Zachary Lagha	Canada	177.53	7	70.50	6	107.03
7	Caroline Green / Michael Parsons	United States	173.82	8	69.00	7	104.82
8	Betina Popova / Sergey Mozgov	Russia	173.54	6	71.44	8	102.10
9	Sofia Evdokimova / Egor Bazin	Russia	167.39	9	67.20	10	100.19
10	Haley Sales / Nikolas Wamsteeker	Canada	164.27	10	63.06	9	101.21
