= 2020 Four Nationals Figure Skating Championships =

Figure skating competition

- Type: National championship
- Date: 13 – 14 December 2019
- Season: 2019–20
- Location: Ostrava, Czech Republic
- Host: Czech Figure Skating Association
- Venue: Ostravar Aréna

Champions
- Men's singles: (Czech Republic) Michal Březina (Hungary) András Csernoch (Poland) Mikchail Mogilen (Slovakia) Michael Neuman
- Ladies' singles: (Czech Republic) Eliška Březinová (Hungary) Ivett Tóth (Poland) Ekaterina Kurakova (Slovakia) Ema Doboszová
- Pairs: (Czech Republic) Elizaveta Zhuk / Martin Bidař (Hungary) Ioulia Chtchetinina / Márk Magyar
- Ice dance: (Hungary) Emily Monaghan / Ilias Fourati (Poland) Natalia Kaliszek / Maksym Spodyriev
- Previous: 2019 Four National Championships
- Next: 2021 Four National Championships; 2021 Hungarian Championships

The 2020 Four Nationals Figure Skating Championships were held from 13 to 14 December 2019 in Ostrava, Czech Republic. It served as the national championships for the Czech Republic, Hungary, Poland, and Slovakia. The three highest-placing skaters from each country formed their national podiums, after the competition results were split. Medals were awarded in men's singles, ladies' singles, pair skating, and ice dance on the senior, junior, and advanced novice levels. The results were among the criteria used by each national federation to determine international assignments.

== Medals summary ==
=== Senior ===
Nation	Discipline	Gold	Silver	Bronze
Czech Republic	Men	Michal Březina	Matyáš Bělohradský	Jiří Bělohradský
Czech Republic	Ladies	Eliška Březinová	Nikola Rychtaříková	Katerina Fricova
Czech Republic	Pairs	Elizaveta Zhuk / Martin Bidař	No other competitors	
Czech Republic	Ice dance	No competitors		
Hungary	Men	András Csernoch	Máté Böröcz	No other competitors
Hungary	Ladies	Ivett Tóth	Regina Schermann	Bernadett Szigeti
Hungary	Pairs	Ioulia Chtchetinina / Márk Magyar	No other competitors	
Hungary	Ice dance	Emily Monaghan / Ilias Fourati	Leia Dozzi / Michael Valdez	No other competitors
Poland	Men	Mikchail Mogilen	Łukasz Kędzierski	Miłosz Witkowski
Poland	Ladies	Ekaterina Kurakova	Oliwia Rzepiel	Elżbieta Gabryszak
Poland	Pairs	No competitors		
Poland	Ice dance	Natalia Kaliszek / Maksym Spodyriev	Justyna Plutowska / Jérémie Flemin	Anastasia Polibina / Pavlo Golovishnikov
Slovakia	Men	Michael Neuman	Marco Klepoch	No other competitors
Slovakia	Ladies	Ema Doboszová	Claudia Mifkovičová	Bianca Srbecká
Slovakia	Pairs	No competitors		
Slovakia	Ice dance	No competitors		

=== Junior ===
Nation	Discipline	Gold	Silver	Bronze
Czech Republic	Pairs	Lucie Novotná / Mykyta Husakov	No other competitors	
Czech Republic	Ice dance	Natálie Taschlerová / Filip Taschler	Denisa Cimlová / Vilém Hlavsa	Elisabeta Kořínková / Tomas Moravec
Hungary	Pairs	No competitors		
Hungary	Ice dance	Villő Marton / Danijil Szemko	Katica Kedves / Fedor Sharonov	Petra Csikos / Patrik Csikos
Poland	Pairs	No competitors		
Poland	Ice dance	Oliwia Borowska / Filip Bojanowski	Olivia Oliver / Joshua Andari	No other competitors
Slovakia	Pairs	No competitors		
Slovakia	Ice dance	No competitors		

=== Advanced novice ===
Nation	Discipline	Gold	Silver	Bronze
Czech Republic	Pairs	Barbora Kucianová / Lukas Vochozka	No other competitors	
Hungary	Pairs	No competitors		
Poland	Pairs	No competitors		
Slovakia	Pairs	Margaréta Mušková / Oliver Kubačák	No other competitors	

== Senior results ==
=== Men ===
Rank	Name	Nation	Total points	SP		FS	
1	Michal Březina	Czech Republic	247.53	1	82.95	1	164.58
2	Matyáš Bělohradský	Czech Republic	209.96	3	68.58	2	141.38
3	Jiří Bělohradský	Czech Republic	193.99	4	63.93	3	130.06
4	Filip Scerba	Czech Republic	189.58	2	68.94	6	120.64
5	Radek Jakubka	Czech Republic	184.12	7	60.48	4	123.64
6	Georgii Reshtenko	Czech Republic	183.51	5	62.40	5	121.11
7	Mikchail Mogilen	Poland	175.45	8	57.20	7	118.25
8	Łukasz Kędzierski	Poland	161.84	6	61.58	9	100.26
9	Michael Neuman	Slovakia	158.04	10	53.39	8	104.65
10	Daniel Mrázek	Czech Republic	154.86	9	55.77	11	99.09
11	András Csernoch	Hungary	150.35	13	50.18	10	100.17
12	Máté Böröcz	Hungary	138.65	12	50.18	12	88.47
13	Marco Klepoch	Slovakia	134.92	11	50.37	13	84.55
14	Miłosz Witkowski	Poland	125.34	14	44.39	14	82.52
15	Michal Wozniak	Poland	124.17	15	41.65	15	80.95

=== Ladies ===
Rank	Name	Nation	Total points	SP		FS	
1	Ekaterina Kurakova	Poland	177.96	1	57.30	1	120.66
2	Ivett Tóth	Hungary	159.09	3	52.26	2	106.83
3	Regina Schermann	Hungary	155.77	4	50.98	3	104.79
4	Eliška Březinová	Czech Republic	138.31	2	56.85	9	81.46
5	Bernadett Szigeti	Hungary	136.26	7	43.56	4	92.70
6	Nikola Rychtaříková	Czech Republic	134.44	5	46.76	5	87.68
7	Fruzsina Medgyesi	Hungary	126.58	11	39.84	6	86.74
8	Ema Doboszová	Slovakia	126.35	8	41.82	7	84.53
9	Katerina Fricova	Czech Republic	126.32	6	43.83	8	82.49
10	Klára Štěpánová	Czech Republic	120.51	9	41.56	10	78.95
11	Oliwia Rzepiel	Poland	115.41	12	39.36	11	76.05
12	Elżbieta Gabryszak	Poland	107.08	10	41.47	15	65.61
13	Magdalena Zawadzka	Poland	105.76	13	36.67	13	69.09
14	Yelizaveta Surova	Poland	100.95	17	31.62	12	69.33
15	Agnieszka Rejment	Poland	100.52	15	34.17	14	66.35
16	Claudia Mifkovičová	Slovakia	93.31	16	32.51	16	60.80
17	Amelia Rams	Poland	92.99	14	35.01	17	57.98
18	Bianca Srbecká	Slovakia	80.48	18	27.53	18	52.95

=== Pairs ===
Two separate pairs events were held, an international and a domestic Czech edition, as Elizaveta Zhuk (formerly of Russia) has not been released to compete internationally for the Czech Republic.

==== International ====
Rank	Name	Nation	Total points	SP		FS	
1	Ioulia Chtchetinina / Márk Magyar	Hungary	165.04	1	55.65	1	109.39

==== Domestic ====
Rank	Name	Nation	Total points	SP		FS	
1	Elizaveta Zhuk / Martin Bidař	Czech Republic	143.59	1	49.12	1	94.47

=== Ice dance ===
Rank	Name	Nation	Total points	RD		FD	
1	Natalia Kaliszek / Maksym Spodyriev	Poland	187.50	1	75.31	1	112.19
2	Justyna Plutowska / Jérémie Flemin	Poland	164.79	2	65.44	2	99.35
3	Anastasia Polibina / Pavlo Golovishnikov	Poland	151.51	3	59.38	3	92.13
4	Emily Monaghan / Ilias Fourati	Hungary	146.01	5	55.81	4	90.20
5	Leia Dozzi / Michael Valdez	Hungary	145.44	4	57.01	5	88.43
6	Jenna Hertenstein / Damian Binkowski	Poland	128.37	6	49.20	6	79.17

== Junior results ==
=== Pairs ===
Rank	Name	Nation	Total points	SP		FS	
1	Lucie Novotná / Mykyta Husakov	Czech Republic	95.00	1	30.39	1	64.61

=== Ice dance ===
Rank	Name	Nation	Total points	RD		FD	
1	Natálie Taschlerová / Filip Taschler	Czech Republic	155.61	1	60.89	1	94.72
2	Villő Marton / Danijil Szemko	Hungary	138.31	2	57.70	3	80.61
3	Denisa Cimlová / Vilém Hlavsa	Czech Republic	137.15	3	54.18	2	82.97
4	Elisabeta Kořínková / Tomas Moravec	Czech Republic	118.90	5	47.18	4	71.72
5	Katica Kedves / Fedor Sharonov	Hungary	115.33	6	44.54	5	70.79
6	Oliwia Borowska / Filip Bojanowski	Poland	115.31	4	48.17	6	67.14
7	Olivia Oliver / Joshua Andari	Poland	105.33	7	39.93	7	65.40
8	Petra Csikos / Patrik Csikos	Hungary	88.39	8	33.25	8	55.14
