= 2020 Chinese Figure Skating Championships =

Figure skating competition

- Type: National championship
- Date: September 14 – 16, 2019
- Season: 2019–20
- Location: Changchun, Jilin
- Host: Chinese Skating Association

Champions
- Men's singles: Yan Han (S); Chen Yudong (J)
- Ladies' singles: An Xiangyi (S); Jin Hengxin (J)
- Pairs: Peng Cheng / Jin Yang (S); Wang Yuchen / Huang Yihang (J)
- Ice dance: Wang Shiyue / Liu Xinyu (S); Chen Xizi / Xing Jianing (J)
- Previous: 2019 Chinese Championships
- Next: 2022 Chinese Championships

The 2020 Chinese Figure Skating Championships (Chinese: 2019/2020年度全国花样滑冰锦标赛) were held from September 14–16, 2019 in Changchun, Jilin. Medals were awarded in the disciplines of men's singles, ladies' singles, pair skating, and ice dance at the senior and junior levels.

Athletes will compete again at the 2020 National Winter Games held in February in Inner Mongolia.

== Medal summary ==
=== Senior ===
Discipline	Gold	Silver	Bronze
Men	Yan Han	Zhang He	Wang Yi
Ladies	An Xiangyi	Chen Hongyi	Lin Shan
Pairs	Peng Cheng / Jin Yang	Tang Feiyao / Yang Yongchao	Liu Jiaxi / Xie Zhong
Ice dance	Wang Shiyue / Liu Xinyu	Chen Hong / Sun Zhuoming	Ning Wanqi / Wang Chao

=== Junior ===
Discipline	Gold	Silver	Bronze
Men	Chen Yudong	Liu Mutong	Dai Dawei
Ladies	Jin Hengxin	Xia Xiaoyu	Zhang Yixuan
Pairs	Wang Yuchen / Huang Yihang	Wang Huidi / Jia Ziqi	Li Jiaen / Wang Zijian
Ice dance	Chen Xizi / Xing Jianing	Lin Yufei / Gao Zijian	Cao Luchang / Chen Jianxu

== Senior-level results ==
=== Senior men ===
Rank	Name	Total points	SP		FS	
1	Yan Han	231.50	2	83.03	1	148.47
2	Zhang He	228.46	1	86.08	2	142.38
3	Wang Yi	194.93	3	69.38	3	125.55
4	Tian Tonghe	185.71	4	61.15	4	124.56
5	Rong Qinglong	170.56	6	55.88	5	114.68
6	Xu Juwen	153.20	7	54.74	6	98.46
7	Liu Runqi	146.11	5	58.44	10	87.67
8	Yuan Liqin	141.13	9	47.63	7	93.50
9	Wang Bofeng	137.07	8	49.26	9	87.81
10	Peng Zhiming	136.08	11	44.60	8	91.48
11	Zhao Hanyu	126.05	10	45.74	11	80.31
12	Ma Chonghe	115.64	14	38.65	12	76.99
13	Li Pengrui	114.88	12	39.47	13	75.41
14	Li Jiaxing	112.93	13	38.97	14	73.96

=== Senior ladies ===
Rank	Name	Total points	SP		FS	
1	An Xiangyi	197.93	1	66.50	1	131.43
2	Chen Hongyi	176.26	2	61.97	3	114.29
3	Lin Shan	171.99	6	47.71	2	124.28
4	Cao Qijing	148.76	3	54.60	5	94.16
5	Kang Shuhui	146.02	4	53.19	6	92.83
6	Shi Jiaxin	141.61	7	46.39	4	95.22
7	Jin Guanru	141.25	5	51.79	8	89.46
8	Sha Chenchen	135.62	9	43.87	7	91.75
9	Su Wenwan	124.84	11	42.71	9	82.13
10	Zheng Lu	124.42	8	44.94	11	79.48
11	Jin Minzhi	123.53	10	43.72	10	79.81
12	Chen Qingrun	117.65	13	41.29	12	76.36
13	Li Xiangning	117.52	12	41.47	13	76.05
14	Ding Yuxuan	112.16	16	39.42	14	72.74
15	Hou Meiran	110.63	15	39.58	15	71.05
16	Cheng Ziling	105.99	14	40.43	16	65.56
17	Zhang Bangxi	104.72	18	34.82	16	69.90
18	Zhou Zijun	100.18	19	32.01	17	68.17
19	Megan Wong	93.94	17	35.62	19	58.32

=== Senior pairs ===
Rank	Name	Total points	SP		FS	
1	Peng Cheng / Jin Yang	202.66	1	76.85	1	125.81
2	Tang Feiyao / Yang Yongchao	182.41	2	61.90	2	120.51
3	Liu Jiaxi / Xie Zhong	167.12	3	56.59	3	110.53
4	Yu Xiaoyu / Zhang Hao	163.87	4	55.83	4	108.04
5	Zheng Lu / Zhu Lei	67.89	5	25.46	5	42.43

=== Senior ice dance ===
Rank	Name	Total points	RD		FD	
1	Wang Shiyue / Liu Xinyu	192.58	1	75.35	1	117.23
2	Chen Hong / Sun Zhuoming	181.99	2	71.98	2	110.01
3	Ning Wanqi / Wang Chao	157.48	3	60.05	3	97.43
4	Guo Yuzhu / Zhao Pengkun	152.20	5	55.54	5	96.66
5	Shi Shang / Wu Nan	151.81	6	54.51	4	97.30
6	Ren Junfei / Alexey Karpushov	151.21	4	58.41	6	92.80
7	Chen Xuan / Zhao Kaige	129.28	8	47.93	7	81.35
8	Liu Tong / Ge Quanshuo	121.00	7	49.55	8	71.45
9	Yu Xinyi / Liu Tianyi	101.81	9	40.10	9	61.71
10	Shao Xinying / Dong Ziming	95.33	10	36.19	10	59.14
11	Wang Zixuan / Fei Wenrun	91.21	11	34.18	11	57.03
