= Ashley Lin =

American-born Chinese figure skater (born 2003)

Personal information
- Native name: 林姗
- Other names: Lin Shan
- Born: March 12, 2003 (age 23) Frisco, Texas, U.S.
- Home town: Frisco, Texas, U.S.
- Height: 5 ft 3 in (1.60 m)

Figure skating career
- Country: China (since 2019); United States (until 2019)
- Coach: Alexei Letov; Olga Ganicheva
- Skating club: Skating Club of Boston
- Began skating: 2008
- Retired: 2022?

Ashley Lin or Lin Shan (Chinese: 林姗; born March 12, 2003) is a former American-born Chinese figure skater, that represented China in ladies' singles. She is the 2020 Chinese national bronze medalist.

Born in the United States, she competed for the U.S. and won the 2017 U.S. national junior bronze medal, before representing China internationally.

== Personal life ==
Lin was born in Frisco, Texas, on March 12, 2003, to Chinese immigrants from Shanghai. Her parents both work in computer companies. According to Xinhua News, Lin became a naturalized Chinese citizen in early 2019, and thus relinquished her U.S. citizenship, as China does not allow dual nationality.

Lin was accepted to the Wharton School of the University of Pennsylvania as part of the Class of 2026.

== Career ==
=== Early career ===
Lin began skating in 2008. She was the 2016 U.S. national novice pewter medalist.

=== 2016–2017 season ===
Lin was assigned to her first international event, 2016 JGP Slovenia, where she placed sixth. She won Midwestern Sectionals and advanced to the 2017 U.S. Championships, where she won bronze.

=== 2017–2018 season ===
Lin again placed sixth at 2017 JGP Latvia to start the season. Competing in the senior division, she won the pewter medal at Midwestern Sectionals and qualified for the 2018 U.S. Championships. Lin was 21st after the short program at the 2018 U.S. Championships, and later withdrew from the free skating for unspecified reasons.

=== 2018–2019 season ===
Lin opened her season with a fifth-place finish in the junior division at the 2018 Asian Open Figure Skating Trophy. She made her senior international debut at 2018 CS Nebelhorn Trophy, where she earned personal bests in all segments to place fifth overall. Lin then competed at 2018 CS Inge Solar Memorial – Alpen Trophy, where she narrowly missed the podium, finishing in fourth 0.06 points behind Australia's Brooklee Han after a free skating comeback.

Lin qualified to the 2019 U.S. Championships, but withdrew in January to begin the process of switching nationalities.

=== 2019–2020 season ===
Lin officially switched to representing her parents' native country of China in 2019, as part of the country's initiative to recruit top athletes leading up to the 2022 Winter Olympics in Beijing.

Lin won the bronze medal at the 2019–20 Chinese Championships in September behind An Xiangyi and Chen Hongyi. Her coach, Chen Lu, told media that they were aiming to refine details and increase Lin's difficulty in the lead-up to the Olympics.

The Chinese Skating Association arranged for Lin to train with coaches Eteri Tutberidze, Sergei Dudakov, and Daniil Gleikhengauz in Moscow, Russia for two weeks in October.

=== 2020–2021 season ===
After the COVID-19 pandemic led Grand Prix assignments to be allotted geographically, Lin was assigned to compete at the 2020 Skate America. Making her international debut for China, she placed sixth at the event, including a fifth-place finish in the free skate. Lin was named the alternate for the 2021 World Championships.

== Programs ==
Season	Short program	Free skating
2020–2021	On My Own (from Les Misérables) by Claude-Michel Schönberg, Alain Boublil	Kissing You (from Romeo and Juliet) by Des'ree
2018–2019	Je suis malade performed by Lara Fabian	And the Waltz Goes On by Anthony Hopkins
2017–2018	Violin Fantasy on Puccini's Turandot performed by Vanessa-Mae	Red Violin by Joaquín Rodrigo
2016–2017	Memory (from Cats) by Andrew Lloyd Webber	Sandstorm by La Bionda

== Competitive highlights ==
CS: Challenger Series; GP: Grand Prix; JGP: Junior Grand Prix. Pewter medals (4th place) awarded only at U.S. national, sectional, and regional events.

=== For China ===
International
Event	19–20	20–21	21–22
GP Cup of China			C
GP Italy			WD
GP Skate America		6th	
CS Asian Open			WD
CS Autumn Classic			WD
Cranberry Cup			9th
National
Chinese Champ.	3rd	C	C
TBD = Assigned; WD = Withdrew; C = Event cancelled

=== For the United States ===
International
Event	16–17	17–18	18–19
CS Alpen Trophy			4th
CS Nebelhorn Trophy			5th
International: Junior
JGP Latvia		6th	
JGP Slovenia	6th		
Asian Open Trophy			5th
National
U.S. Champ.	3rd J	WD	WD
