= Yang Yongchao =

Chinese pair skater

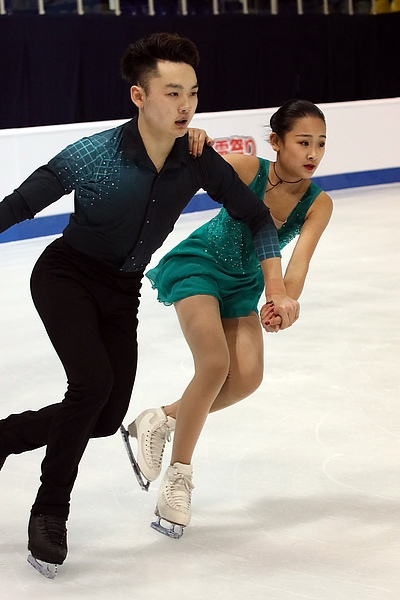
- Tang / Yang at the 2019 World Junior Championships

Personal information
- Native name: 杨泳超
- Full name: Yang Yongchao
- Born: August 25, 1998 (age 28) Changchun, China
- Height: 1.71 m (5 ft 7 1/2 in)

Figure skating career
- Country: China
- Partner: Zhang Siyang
- Coach: Song Lun
- Skating club: Heilongjiang Skating Training Center
- Began skating: 2003

Yang Yongchao (simplified Chinese: 杨泳超; traditional Chinese: 楊泳超; pinyin: Yáng Yǒngchāo; born August 25, 1998) is a Chinese pair skater who currently competes with Zhang Siyang. Together, they are the 2022 Chinese nationals pairs skating champions.

With his former partner, Tang Feiyao, he is the 2019 Chinese national pairs skating bronze medalist and 2020 Chinese nationals pairs skating silver medalist.

== Personal life ==
Yang was born on August 25, 1998, in Changchun, China.

== Career ==
=== Early career ===
Yang began figure skating in 2003.

Yang's first pair skating partner was Sui Jiaying. Together they competed at four National Championships, placing seventh in 2013, sixth in 2014, fourth in 2015, and winning a silver medal in 2016.

The pair split following the 2015–16 season.

=== Partnership with Han ===
==== 2016–17 season ====
For the 2016–17 figure skating season, Yang teamed up with Han Yue.

Together, they competed on the 2016–17 Junior Grand Prix series, placing eighth at JGP Estonia and seventh at JGP Germany.

They then went on to compete at the 2017 Chinese Championships, where they won the silver medal.

Following the season, the pair parted ways.

=== Partnership with Tang ===
==== 2017–18 season ====
Prior to the 2017–18 figure skating season, Yang teamed up with Tang Feiyao.

They debuted on the 2017–18 Junior Grand Prix series, placing fourth at JGP Belarus.

At the 2018 Chinese Championships, they placed fifth.

Tang/Yang were then assigned to compete at the 2018 World Junior Championships, where they placed twelfth.

==== 2018–19 season ====
Tang/Yang competed on the 2018–19 Junior Grand Prix series, placing fifth at JGP Canada and seventh at JGP Czech Republic.

They then went on to win the bronze medal at the 2019 Chinese Championships and were assigned to compete at the 2019 World Junior Championships, where they placed fourth.

==== 2019–20 season ====
Tang Feiyao and Yang Yongchao during the 2019 Cup of China

Tang/Yang made their senior international debut at the 2019 CS Nebelhorn Trophy, where they finished fourth. They then went on to win the bronze medal at the 2019 Shanghai Trophy.

Debuting in the 2019–20 Grand Prix series, the pair placed seventh at both the 2019 Skate Canada International and 2019 Cup of China.

The pair then went on to win the silver medal at the 2020 Chinese Championships and were named to both the Four Continents and World team.

The pair, however, withdrew from the 2020 Four Continents Championships shortly before the event.

Moreover, the 2020 World Championships in Montreal, Quebec, were cancelled due to the COVID-19 pandemic.

==== 2020–21 season ====
Although, Tang/Yang were assigned to compete at the 2020 Cup of China, they withdrew from the event.

Following the season, the pair parted ways.

=== Partnership with Zhang ===
==== 2022–23 season ====
For the 2022-23 figure skating season, Yang teamed up with former singles skater, Zhang Siyang. The pair debuted internationally at the 2022 CS Golden Spin of Zagreb, where they placed seventh.

At the 2022 Chinese Championships, the pair won the gold medal. With this result, the pair were selected to compete at the 2023 Four Continents Championships and the 2023 World Championships. At the 2023 Four Continents Championships in Colorado Springs, Colorado, the pair finished eighth.

Two weeks prior to the 2023 World Championships in Saitama, Japan, Zhang suffered a bad fall in practice and had to get twelve stitches in her chin. At the World Championships, the pair managed to qualify for the free program segment of the competition by placing twentieth in the short program. In the free skate, the pair placed seventeenth and moved up to seventeenth-place overall.

==== 2023-24 season ====
Zhang/Yang began the season at the Shanghai Trophy, where they won the bronze medal. They were invited to make their ISU Grand Prix debut at the 2023 Cup of China, finishing in fifth place.

== Programs ==
=== With Zhang ===
Season	Short program	Free skating	Exhibition
2023–2024	Wu Shu (Wu Kong) by Gregory Tan, Iliya Zaki choreo. by Misha Ge	If Came the Hour by Secret Garden & Tommy Körberg choreo. by Misha Ge, Yura Min	365 days of missing you （想你的三百六十五天） by Coco Lee（李玟） choreo. by Misha Ge; You Are the Reason by Calum Scott & Leona Lewis
2022–2023	Saturday Night Fever: Stayin' Alive; You Should Be Dancing by Bee Gees, Walter Taieb choreo. by Elvin Wong	Les Misérables: Les Misérables performed by Royal Philharmonic Orchestra; I Dreamed a Dream performed by Boston Pops and John Williams; Epilogue by Claude-Michel Schönberg choreo. by Elvin Wong	Toca-Toca by Fly Project; We No Speak Americano by Yolanda Be Cool and DCUP

=== With Tang ===
Season	Short program	Free skating
2019–2020	Tango de los Exilados by Vanessa Mae, Walter Taieb choreo. by Pascal Denis	The Greatest Show performed by Hugh Jackman; Never Enough (Reprise) performed by Loren Allred; This Is Me performed by Keala Settle (from The Greatest Showman) by Benj Pasek & Justin Paul choreo. by Pascal Denis
2018–2019	Even More Magma choreo. by Shae Zukiwsky	Feeling Good performed by Michael Bublé choreo. by Shae Zukiwsky
2017–2018	Rise choreo. by Elvin Wong, Shae Zukiwsky	Kung Fu Panda by Hans Zimmer, John Powell choreo. by Elvin Wong, Shae Zukiwsky

=== With Han ===
Season	Short program	Free skating
2016–2017	The Lonely Goatherd by Richard Rodgers choreo. by Elvin Wong	Puss in Boots by Henry Jackman; One Leche; Chasing Tail; The Puss Suite; Team Effort; Diablo Rojo choreo. by Elvin Wong

== Competitive highlights ==
GP: Grand Prix; CS: Challenger Series; JGP: Junior Grand Prix

=== Pairs with Zhang ===
International
Event	22–23	23–24	24-25
Worlds	17th		
Four Continents	8th	10th	
GP Cup of China		5th	TBD
CS Golden Spin of Zagreb	7th		
Shanghai Trophy		3rd	
National
Chinese Champ.	1st	3rd	
Chinese Champ. Comp	1st		
WD = Withdrew; C = Event cancelled

=== Pairs with Tang ===
International
Event	17–18	18–19	19–20	20–21
Worlds			C	
Four Continents			WD	
GP Skate Canada			7th	
GP Cup of China			7th	WD
CS Nebelhorn Trophy			4th	
Shanghai Trophy			3rd	
International: Junior
Junior Worlds	12th	4th		
JGP Belarus	4th			
JGP Canada		5th		
JGP Czech Republic		7th		
National
Chinese Champ.	5th	3rd	2nd	
WD = Withdrew; C = Event cancelled

=== Pairs with Han ===
International
Event	2016–17
JGP Estonia	8th
JGP Germany	7th
National
Chinese Championships	2nd

=== Pairs with Sui ===
National
Event	12–13	13–14	14–15	15–16
Chinese Championships	7th	6th	4th	2nd

== Detailed results ==
=== With Zhang ===
Current personal best scores are highlighted in bold.

**2023–24 season**
Date	Event	SP	FS	Total
30 January-4 February, 2024	2024 Four Continents Championships	10; 55.70	10; 101.62	10; 157.32
22-24 December, 2023	2023 Chinese Championships	3; 60.48	2; 107.89	3; 168.37
10–12 November, 2023	2023 Cup of China	5; 58.71	6; 102.94	5; 161.65
3-5 October, 2023	2023 Shanghai Trophy	4; 56.09	2; 117.48	3; 173.57
2022–23 season
Date	Event	SP	FS	Total
22–26 March 2023	2023 World Championships	20; 50.32	17; 97.91	17; 148.23
7–12 February 2023	2023 Four Continents Championships	8; 56.10	8; 97.66	8; 153.76
11–13 January 2023	2022 Chinese Championships	8; 56.10	8; 97.66	8; 153.76
7–10 December 2022	2022 CS Golden Spin of Zagreb	8; **56.44**	5; **104.89**	7; **161.33**

=== With Tang ===
Current personal best scores are highlighted in bold.

2019–20 season
Date	Event	Level	SP	FS	Total
8–10 November 2019	2019 Cup of China	Senior	7; 61.85	7; 110.68	7; 172.63
25–27 October 2019	2019 Skate Canada International	Senior	7; 62.35	8; 108.22	7; 170.57
25–28 September 2019	2019 Shanghai Trophy	Senior	3; 64.68	3; 107.60	3; 172.28
25–28 September 2019	2019 CS Nebelhorn Trophy	Senior	5; **66.29**	4; **116.47**	4; **182.76**
14–16 September 2019	2020 Chinese Championships	Senior	2; 61.90	2; 120.51	2; 182.41
2018–19 season
4–10 March 2019	2019 World Junior Championships	Junior	4; 60.77	4; 108.00	4; 168.77
29–30 December 2018	2019 Chinese Championships	Senior	4; 56.23	3; 109.51	3; 165.74
26–29 September 2018	2017 JGP Czech Republic	Junior	6; 52.24	6; 88.35	7; 140.59
12–15 September 2018	2017 JGP Canada	Junior	6; 47.42	5; 88.01	5; 135.43
2017–18 season
5–11 March 2018	2018 World Junior Championships	Junior	11; 48.15	12; 82.82	12; 130.97
23–24 December 2017	2018 Chinese Championships	Senior	5; 53.90	5; 102.90	5; 156.80
20–24 October 2017	2017 JGP Belarus	Junior	3; 54.00	4; 93.67	4; 147.67

=== With Han ===
2016–17 season
Date	Event	SP	FS	Total	
24–25 December 2016	2017 Chinese Championships	Senior	2; 55.03	2; 103.29	2; 158.32
5–9 October 2016	2016 JGP Germany	Junior	5; **50.47**	7; **87.06**	7; **137.53**
September 28–October 2 2016	2016 JGP Estonia	Junior	7; 48.68	10; 78.84	8; 127.52

=== With Sui ===
2015–16 season
Date	Event	SP	FS	Total
26–27 December 2015	2016 Chinese Championships	2; 49.34	2; 98.01	2; 147.35
2014–15 season
27–28 December 2014	2015 Chinese Championships	4; 49.12	3; 92.17	4; 141.29
2013–14 season
28–29 December 2013	2014 Chinese Championships	6; 45.71	6; 79.75	6; 125.46
2012–13 season
20–21 December 2012	2013 Chinese Championships	7; 29.51	7; 64.48	7; 93.99
