= 2020 World Figure Skating Championships =

- Type: ISU Championship
- Date: 16 – 22 March
- Season: 2019–20
- Location: Montreal, Quebec, Canada
- Host: Skate Canada
- Venue: Bell Centre

The 2020 World Figure Skating Championships were scheduled to be held in Montreal, Quebec, Canada, from 16 to 22 March 2020. Figure skaters would have competed for the title of world champion in men's singles, ladies' singles, pairs, and ice dance. This would have been the first time that Montreal hosted the World Figure Skating Championships since 1932. The competition was supposed to determine the entry quotas for each federation at the 2021 World Championships.

The competition was cancelled on 11 March due to concerns about the COVID-19 pandemic, with the possibility of being held later in the year, but not within the current season. It was the second time the event had been cancelled for reasons other than a World War, after the 1961 World Championships were cancelled following the Sabena Flight 548 crash.

The competition was formally cancelled on 16 April, after the International Skating Union (ISU) previously considered rescheduling to later within the year. A year later, Skate Canada successfully bid for the right to host the 2024 World Championships in Montreal in lieu of the cancelled earlier event.

== Reactions to the COVID-19 pandemic ==
After a spike in COVID-19 cases from the ongoing pandemic and the cancellation of the 2020 Women's Ice Hockey World Championships in Nova Scotia by the International Ice Hockey Federation, the ISU was placed under intense pressure to make a public statement on the status of the 2020 World Figure Skating Championships, as the disease rapidly intensified across the world. The ISU had implemented prevention methods at its events since 4 February 2020 and required all attendees seeking accreditation to complete a questionnaire and temperature check.

Skate Canada, the host federation, issued a statement on Friday, 6 March, that all athletes would be screened for symptoms at the border, undergo health checks, and be required to fill out questionnaires throughout the competition. On Tuesday, 10 March, media, officials, skaters, and coaches scheduled to attend the event received a lengthy Coronavirus Information Package from the ISU. All individuals attending the event would have been required to undergo a temperature check upon arrival to the competition and would have been required to check in under 38 °C (100 °F). The Quebec Health Ministry held a press conference the same day to discuss "all major events in the province...with input from the Public Health Agency of Canada." At the meeting, Quebec Minister of Health Danielle McCann indicated that cancellation was a possibility, but a final decision had not yet been reached, despite athletes being scheduled to arrive within the next few days.

At 3:30 PM EDT on Wednesday, 11 March, the Quebec government and Quebec Health Ministry made the decision to cancel the World Championships. The ISU posted a statement agreeing with the decision, saying that the event could possibly be rescheduled for later in the year, but not before October 2020. It was unclear how the cancellation would affect the upcoming season and its subsequent Grand Prix assignments, which will begin before then.

On 12 April 2020, ISU Vice-President for Figure Skating, Alexander Lakernik, told media that the chances of rescheduling the championship were slim, due to the ongoing pandemic. The ISU confirmed a complete cancellation of the event, with no chance of postponement to a later date, on 16 April.

=== ISU member nations' response ===
Prior to the cancellation announcement on 11 March, the Polish Figure Skating Association asked its athletes on 10 March to make personal decisions by the next day, 11 March, on whether or not to attend the event, following the Polish Minister of Sport's recommendation to avoid travel to foreign events.

Skate Canada, the host federation, postponed several conference calls with its skaters from 11 to 13 March, while awaiting a decision by the local Quebec government on the status of the event.

Several prominent skaters, including two-time reigning men's World Champion Nathan Chen, and coaches Rafael Arutyunyan, Lee Barkell, Marie-France Dubreuil, and Brian Orser, expressed concerns over the possibility of rescheduling the competition to fall 2020, citing the disruption to their training schedules and the proximity to the 2021 edition of the event.

== Qualification ==
Based on the results of the 2019 World Championships, these nations would have been eligible to enter more than one skater or team in the indicated disciplines.

| Spots | Men | Ladies | Pairs | Dance |
|---|---|---|---|---|
| 3 | United States; Japan | Russia; Kazakhstan; Japan | China; Russia | Russia; United States; Canada |
| 2 | China; Russia; Italy; Czech Republic | United States; South Korea; Canada | France; Canada; Italy; United States; Austria; Germany | France; Italy |

== Entries ==
The International Skating Union published a complete list of entries on 26 February 2020.

| Country | Men | Ladies | Pairs | Ice dance |
|---|---|---|---|---|
| Armenia | Slavik Hayrapetyan | Anastasia Galustyan | | Tina Garabedian / Simon Proulx-Sénécal |
| Australia | Brendan Kerry | Kailani Craine | | Holly Harris / Jason Chan |
| Austria | Maurizio Zandron | Olga Mikutina | Miriam Ziegler / Severin Kiefer | |
| Azerbaijan | Vladimir Litvintsev | Ekaterina Ryabova | | |
| Belarus | | Viktoriia Safonova | | |
| Brazil | | Isadora Williams | | |
| Bulgaria | Larry Loupolover | Alexandra Feigin | | Mina Zdravkova / Christopher M. Davis |
| Canada | Nam Nguyen | Emily Bausback; Alicia Pineault | Kirsten Moore-Towers / Michael Marinaro; Evelyn Walsh / Trennt Michaud | Piper Gilles / Paul Poirier; Marjorie Lajoie / Zachary Lagha; Carolane Soucisse / Shane Firus |
| China | Jin Boyang | Chen Hongyi | Peng Cheng / Jin Yang; Sui Wenjing / Han Cong; Tang Feiyao / Yang Yongchao | Wang Shiyue / Liu Xinyu |
| Croatia | | | Lana Petranović / Antonio Souza-Kordeiru | |
| Czech Republic | Michal Březina | Eliška Březinová | | Natálie Taschlerová / Filip Taschler |
| Estonia | Aleksandr Selevko | Eva-Lotta Kiibus | | |
| Finland | | Emmi Peltonen | | Juulia Turkkila / Matthias Versluis |
| France | Kévin Aymoz | Maé-Bérénice Méité | Cléo Hamon / Denys Strekalin; Coline Keriven / Noël-Antoine Pierre | Marie-Jade Lauriault / Romain Le Gac; Gabriella Papadakis / Guillaume Cizeron |
| Georgia | Morisi Kvitelashvili | Alina Urushadze | | Maria Kazakova / Georgy Reviya |
| Germany | Paul Fentz | Nicole Schott | Minerva Fabienne Hase / Nolan Seegert; Annika Hocke / Robert Kunkel | Katharina Müller / Tim Dieck |
| Great Britain | Peter James Hallam | Natasha McKay | Zoe Jones / Christopher Boyadji | Lilah Fear / Lewis Gibson |
| Hong Kong | | Yi Christy Leung | | |
| Hungary | | Ivett Tóth | Ioulia Chtchetinina / Márk Magyar | Emily Monaghan / Ilias Fourati |
| Israel | Alexei Bychenko | | Anna Vernikov / Evgeni Krasnopolski | Shira Ichilov / Laurent Abecassis |
| Italy | Daniel Grassl; Matteo Rizzo | Alessia Tornaghi | Nicole Della Monica / Matteo Guarise; Rebecca Ghilardi / Filippo Ambrosini | Charlène Guignard / Marco Fabbri; Katrine Roy / Claudio Pietrantonio |
| Japan | Yuzuru Hanyu; Keiji Tanaka; Shoma Uno | Wakaba Higuchi; Rika Kihira; Satoko Miyahara | Riku Miura / Ryuichi Kihara | Misato Komatsubara / Tim Koleto |
| Kazakhstan | | | | Maxine Weatherby / Temirlan Yerzhanov |
| Latvia | Deniss Vasiļjevs | Angelīna Kučvaļska | | Aurelija Ipolito / J.T. Michel |
| Lithuania | | | | Allison Reed / Saulius Ambrulevičius |
| Malaysia | Julian Zhi Jie Yee | | | |
| Netherlands | | Niki Wories | Daria Danilova / Michel Tsiba | |
| Philippines | | Alisson Krystle Perticheto | | |
| Poland | | Ekaterina Kurakova | | Natalia Kaliszek / Maksym Spodyriev |
| Russia | Dmitri Aliev; Artur Danielian | Alena Kostornaia; Anna Shcherbakova; Alexandra Trusova | Aleksandra Boikova / Dmitrii Kozlovskii; Daria Pavliuchenko / Denis Khodykin; Evgenia Tarasova / Vladimir Morozov | Victoria Sinitsina / Nikita Katsalapov; Alexandra Stepanova / Ivan Bukin; Tiffany Zahorski / Jonathan Guerreiro |
| South Korea | Cha Jun-hwan | Kim Ye-lim; You Young | | Yura Min / Daniel Eaton |
| Spain | | | Laura Barquero / Tòn Cónsul | Olivia Smart / Adrián Díaz |
| Sweden | Nikolaj Majorov | Matilda Algotsson | | |
| Switzerland | Lukas Britschgi | Alexia Paganini | | Victoria Manni / Carlo Röthlisberger |
| Turkey | Burak Demirboğa | | | Nicole Kelly / Berk Akalın |
| Ukraine | Ivan Shmuratko | | | Oleksandra Nazarova / Maxim Nikitin |
| United States | Jason Brown; Nathan Chen; Vincent Zhou | Mariah Bell; Bradie Tennell | Ashley Cain-Gribble / Timothy LeDuc; Jessica Calalang / Brian Johnson | Madison Chock / Evan Bates; Kaitlin Hawayek / Jean-Luc Baker; Madison Hubbell / Zachary Donohue |

=== Changes to preliminary entries ===
| Date | Discipline | Withdrew | Added | Reason/Other notes | Refs |
|---|---|---|---|---|---|
| 26 February | Pairs | (United States) Alexa Scimeca Knierim / Chris Knierim | (United States) Jessica Calalang / Brian Johnson | Chris Knierim retired. | |
| 5 March | Women | (Sweden) Anita Östlund | (Sweden) Matilda Algotsson | Injury recovery | |
| 6 March | Ice dance | (Canada) Laurence Fournier Beaudry / Nikolaj Sørensen | (Canada) Carolane Soucisse / Shane Firus | Recovery from knee surgery (Sørensen) | |
| 7 March | Men | (Finland) Roman Galay | —N/a | Travel restrictions related to the COVID-19 pandemic | |
| 9 March | Men | (Belarus) Alexander Lebedev | —N/a | Travel restrictions related to the COVID-19 pandemic | |
