= Tang Feiyao =

Chinese pair skater (born 2003)

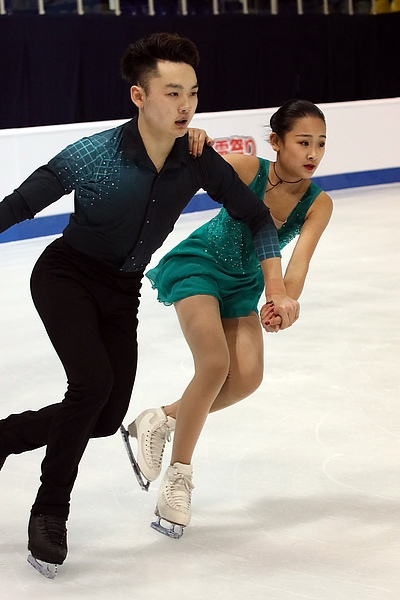
- Tang / Yang at the 2019 World Junior Championships

Personal information
- Native name: 唐菲遥
- Full name: Tang Feiyao
- Born: August 5, 2003 (age 23) Harbin, China
- Height: 1.59 m (5 ft 2 1/2 in)

Figure skating career
- Country: China
- Coach: Zhao Hongbo, Guan Jinlin
- Skating club: Harbin Winter Sports Training Center
- Began skating: 2006

Tang Feiyao (simplified Chinese: 唐菲遥; traditional Chinese: 唐菲遙; pinyin: Táng Fēiyáo; born August 5, 2003) is a Chinese pair skater. With her former partner, Yang Yongchao, she is the 2019 Chinese national pairs skating bronze medalist and 2020 Chinese nationals pairs skating silver medalist.

== Personal life ==
Tang was born on August 5, 2003, in Harbin, China.

== Career ==
Tang began figure skating in 2007.

As a singles skater, she competed at the 2016 Chinese Championships, where she placed eleventh.

=== 2017–18 season ===
For the 2017–18 figure skating season, Tang switched to pairs skating and teamed up with Yang Yongchao.

They debuted on the 2017–18 Junior Grand Prix series, placing fourth at JGP Belarus.

At the 2018 Chinese Championships, they placed fifth.

Tang/Yang were then assigned to compete at the 2018 World Junior Championships, where they placed twelfth.

=== 2018–19 season ===
Tang/Yang competed on the 2018–19 Junior Grand Prix series, placing fifth at JGP Canada and seventh at JGP Czech Republic.

They then went on to win the bronze medal at the 2019 Chinese Championships and were assigned to compete at the 2019 World Junior Championships, where they placed fourth.

=== 2019–20 season ===
Tang/Yang made their senior international debut at the 2019 CS Nebelhorn Trophy, where they finished fourth. They then went on to win the bronze medal at the 2019 Shanghai Trophy.

Debuting on the 2019–20 Grand Prix series, the pair placed seventh at both the 2019 Skate Canada International and 2019 Cup of China.

The pair then went on to win the silver medal at the 2020 Chinese Championships and were named to both the Four Continents and World team.

The pair, however, withdrew from the 2020 Four Continents Championships shortly before the event.

Moreover, the 2020 World Championships in Montreal, Quebec, were cancelled due to the COVID-19 pandemic.

=== 2020–21 season ===
Although, Tang/Yang were assigned to compete at the 2020 Cup of China, they withdrew from the event.

Following the season, the pair parted ways.

== Programs ==
(with Yang)

| Season | Short program | Free skating |
|---|---|---|
| 2019–2020 | Tango de los Exilados by Vanessa Mae, Walter Taieb choreo. by Pascal Denis | The Greatest Show performed by Hugh Jackman; Never Enough (Reprise) performed by Loren Allred; This Is Me performed by Keala Settle (from The Greatest Showman) by Benj Pasek & Justin Paul choreo. by Pascal Denis |
| 2018–2019 | Even More Magma choreo. by Shae Zukiwsky | Feeling Good performed by Michael Bublé choreo. by Shae Zukiwsky |
| 2017–2018 | Rise choreo. by Elvin Wong, Shae Zukiwsky | Kung Fu Panda by Hans Zimmer, John Powell choreo. by Elvin Wong, Shae Zukiwsky |

== Competitive highlights ==
GP: Grand Prix; CS: Challenger Series; JGP: Junior Grand Prix

=== Pairs with Yang ===
International
| Event | 17–18 | 18–19 | 19–20 | 20–21 |
|---|---|---|---|---|
| Worlds | | | C | |
| Four Continents | | | WD | |
| GP Skate Canada | | | 7th | |
| GP Cup of China | | | 7th | WD |
| CS Nebelhorn Trophy | | | 4th | |
| Shanghai Trophy | | | 3rd | |
International: Junior
| Junior Worlds | 12th | 4th | | |
| JGP Belarus | 4th | | | |
| JGP Canada | | 5th | | |
| JGP Czech Republic | | 7th | | |
National
| Chinese Champ. | 5th | 3rd | 2nd | |
WD = Withdrew; C = Event cancelled

=== Ladies' singles ===
National
| Event | 2015–16 |
|---|---|
| Chinese Championships | 11th |

== Detailed results ==
=== With Yang ===
Current personal best scores are highlighted in bold.

2019–20 season
| Date | Event | Level | SP | FS | Total |
|---|---|---|---|---|---|
| 8–10 November 2019 | 2019 Cup of China | Senior | 7; 61.85 | 7; 110.68 | 7; 172.63 |
| 25–27 October 2019 | 2019 Skate Canada International | Senior | 7; 62.35 | 8; 108.22 | 7; 170.57 |
| 25–28 September 2019 | 2019 Shanghai Trophy | Senior | 3; 64.68 | 3; 107.60 | 3; 172.28 |
| 25–28 September 2019 | 2019 CS Nebelhorn Trophy | Senior | 5; **66.29** | 4; **116.47** | 4; **182.76** |
| 14–16 September 2019 | 2020 Chinese Championships | Senior | 2; 61.90 | 2; 120.51 | 2; 182.41 |
2018–19 season
| 4–10 March 2019 | 2019 World Junior Championships | Junior | 4; 60.77 | 4; 108.00 | 4; 168.77 |
| 29–30 December 2018 | 2019 Chinese Championships | Senior | 4; 56.23 | 3; 109.51 | 3; 165.74 |
| 26–29 September 2018 | 2017 JGP Czech Republic | Junior | 6; 52.24 | 6; 88.35 | 7; 140.59 |
| 12–15 September 2018 | 2017 JGP Canada | Junior | 6; 47.42 | 5; 88.01 | 5; 135.43 |
2017–18 season
| 5–11 March 2018 | 2018 World Junior Championships | Junior | 11; 48.15 | 12; 82.82 | 12; 130.97 |
| 23–24 December 2017 | 2018 Chinese Championships | Senior | 5; 53.90 | 5; 102.90 | 5; 156.80 |
| 20–24 October 2017 | 2017 JGP Belarus | Junior | 3; 54.00 | 4; 93.67 | 4; 147.67 |

=== Singles skating ===
2015–16 season
| Date | Event | SP | FS | Total |
|---|---|---|---|---|
| 26–27 December 2015 | 2016 Chinese Championships | 14; 32.40 | 10; 66.72 | 11; 99.12 |
