= Shanghai Trophy =

International figure skating competition

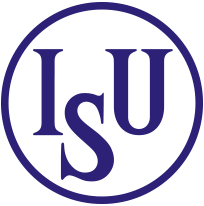
- Location: China

The Shanghai Trophy is an international skating competition held in Shanghai, China, and organized by the Chinese Skating Association. Skaters compete in short track speed skating, synchronized skating, or figure skating. The first event was held in 2016.

== Figure skating results ==
=== Men's singles ===
Year	Gold	Silver	Bronze	Ref.
2017	(Russia) Alexander Samarin	(Georgia (country)) Moris Kvitelashvili	(Kazakhstan) Denis Ten	
2019	(Italy) Matteo Rizzo	(Russia) Alexander Samarin	(China) Jin Boyang	
2023	(France) Adam Siao Him Fa	(South Korea) Cha Jun-hwan	(China) Jin Boyang	
2024	(South Korea) Cha Jun-hwan	(Latvia) Deniss Vasiljevs	(United States) Jason Brown	

=== Women's singles ===
Year	Gold	Silver	Bronze	Ref.
2017	(Russia) Elena Radionova	(Kazakhstan) Elizabet Tursynbayeva	(Russia) Maria Sotskova	
2019	(Russia) Evgenia Medvedeva	(Kazakhstan) Elizabet Tursynbayeva	(South Korea) Lim Eun-soo	
2023	(United States) Bradie Tennell	(South Korea) Lee Hae-in	(Estonia) Niina Petrõkina	
2024	(South Korea) Kim Chae-yeon	(United States) Bradie Tennell	(Belgium) Loena Hendrickx	

=== Pairs ===
Year	Gold	Silver	Bronze	Ref.
2017	(China); Sui Wenjing; Han Cong	(China); Peng Cheng; Jin Yang	(Italy); Valentina Marchei; Ondřej Hotárek	
2019	(China); Peng Cheng; Jin Yang	(Russia); Aleksandra Boikova; Dmitrii Kozlovskii	(China); Tang Feiyao; Yang Yongchao	
2023	(China); Peng Cheng; Wang Lei	(Germany); Annika Hocke; Robert Kunkel	(China); Zhang Siyang; Yang Yongchao	
2024	(Hungary); Maria Pavlova; Alexei Sviatchenko	(Italy); Lucrezia Beccari; Matteo Guarise	(China); Yang Yixi; Deng Shunyang	

=== Ice dance ===
Year	Gold	Silver	Bronze	Ref.
2017	(Russia); Ekaterina Bobrova; Dmitri Soloviev	(Italy); Charlène Guignard; Marco Fabbri	(France); Marie-Jade Lauriault; Romain Le Gac	
2019	(Russia); Victoria Sinitsina; Nikita Katsalapov	(United Kingdom); Lilah Fear; Lewis Gibson	(Poland); Natalia Kaliszek; Maksym Spodyriev	
2023	(Italy); Charlene Guignard; Marco Fabbri	(France); Evgeniia Lopareva; Geoffrey Brissaud	(China); Wang Shiyue; Liu Xinyu	
2024	(Italy); Charlene Guignard; Marco Fabbri	(France); Evgeniia Lopareva; Geoffrey Brissaud	(China); Ren Junfei; Xing Jianing	

=== Synchronized skating ===
Year	Gold	Silver	Bronze	Ref.
2016	(Russia) Paradise	(United States) Haydenettes	(Sweden) Team Surprise	
2017	(Russia) Paradise	(Finland) Marigold IceUnity	(Sweden) Team Surprise	
2019	(Finland) Team Rockettes	(Italy) Team Ice on fire	(Australia) Team Unity	
2023	(Germany) Team Berlin 1	(Hungary) Team Passion	(Australia) Team Unity	
2024	(Finland) Team Rockettes	(Germany) Team Berlin 1	(Hungary) Team Passion	
