= Jelizaveta Žuková =

Russian-Czech pair skater (born 2003)

Jelizaveta Žuková Elizaveta Zhuk
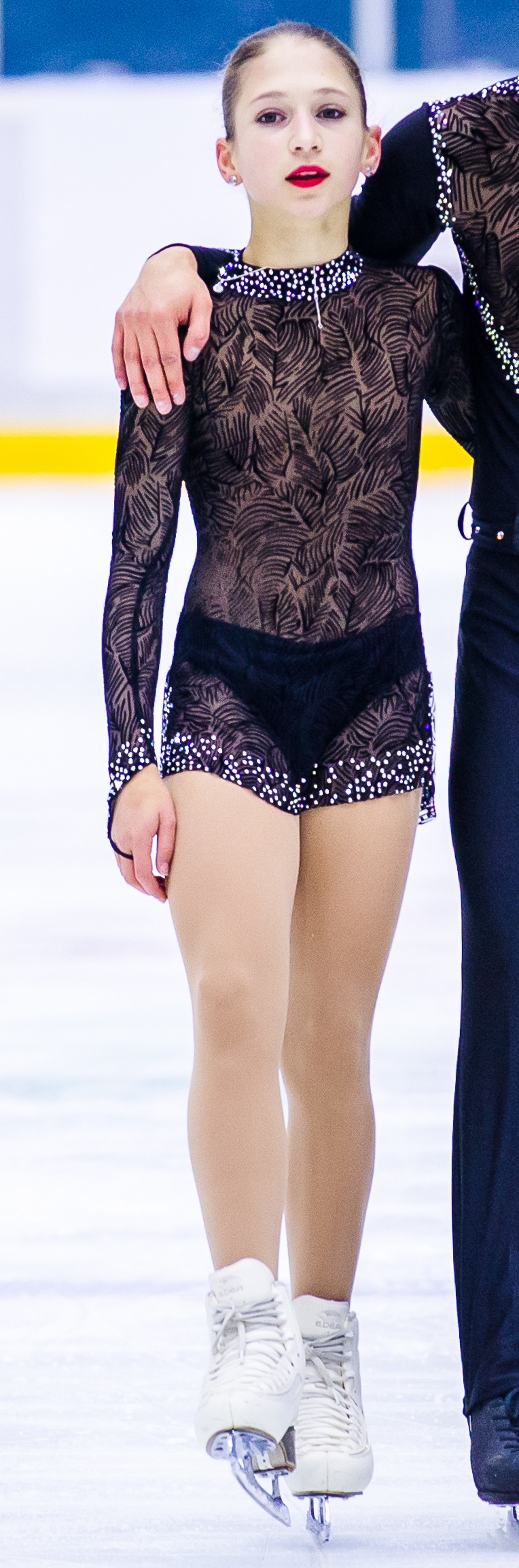

Personal information
- Native name: Елизавета Валерьевна Жук (Russian)
- Full name: Elizaveta Valeriyevna Zhuk
- Other names: Yelizaveta; Jelizaveta Žuk/Žuková
- Born: 2 November 2003 (age 22) Yekaterinburg, Russia
- Height: 1.60 m (5 ft 3 in)

Figure skating career
- Country: Czech Republic (2019–23); Russia (2014–18)
- Discipline: Pair skating
- Partner: Martin Bidař (2019–23); Egor Britkov (2014–18)
- Began skating: 2007
- Retired: December 22, 2022

Medal record
Czech Championships
| Gold medal – first place | 2020 Ostrava | Pairs |
| Gold medal – first place | 2021 Cieszyn | Pairs |

Jelizaveta Žuková or Elizaveta Valeriyevna Zhuk (Russian: Елизавета Валерьевна Жук; born 2 November 2003) is a former Russian-Czech pair skater who competes for the Czech Republic. With her skating partner, Martin Bidař, she is a two-time Czech national champion (2020–2021) and represented the Czech Republic at the 2022 Winter Olympics.

== Personal life ==
Elizaveta Zhuk was born on 2 November 2003 in Yekaterinburg, Russia. In December 2021, she became a Czech citizen. Her name changed to Jelizaveta Žuková, with a feminine suffix added to the Czech transliteration of her Russian name.

== Career ==
=== Early career ===
Zhuk began learning to skate in 2007. Training in pairs, early partners included Maxim Miroshkin and Evgeniy Kostarev. She competed with Egor Britkov for three seasons, placing fourth at the 2017 Russian Junior Championships and winning a silver medal at the 2017 CS Golden Spin of Zagreb the following season.

=== 2019–2020 season ===
On June 26, 2019, Zhuk announced a new partnership with Czech pair skater Martin Bidař, with plans to represent his country. They competed exclusively domestically in their first season together, winning the Czech national title.

=== 2020–2021 season ===
With the COVID-19 pandemic limiting international opportunities, Zhuk/Bidař made their debut internationally at the 2020 CS Nebelhorn Trophy, one of only four pairs on the preliminary entry list. They were fifth in the short, fourth in the free, and fourth overall. They subsequently competed at the 2021 World Championships, placing fifteenth and, in the process, qualifying for a berth for a Czech pair at the 2022 Winter Olympics.

=== 2021–22 season ===
In September, the Czech federation officially named Zhuk and Bidař to the Czech Olympic team. They made their debut at the 2021 Finlandia Trophy, where they placed ninth. They later competed at a second Challenger event, finishing twelfth at the 2021 Warsaw Cup.

Zhuk opted to restyle her name as Jelizaveta Žuková in advance of the Olympics. Žuková and Bidař made their European Championship debut in Tallinn, finishing in twelfth place.

Žuková and Bidař began the 2022 Winter Olympics as the Czech entries in the pairs' Olympic team event, where they placed eighth of nine teams, earning three points for the Czech team. Team Czech Republic did not advance to the next stage of the competition and finished eighth overall. With two falls in the short program of the pairs event, they finished seventeenth and missed qualification for the free skate. Žuková sustained an ankle injury in training; as a result of which they did not compete at the 2022 World Championships.

In March 2022, Žuková liked an Instagram post by Evgeni Plushenko expressing support for the 2022 Russian invasion of Ukraine. The president of the Czech Figure Skating Association noted that the federation strongly disagreed with her position and distanced itself. The president explained to Žuková the unsuitability of her conduct and asked her to apologize for her decision. Žuková apologized, stating that her decision was due to "youthful recklessness" and "misreading and misunderstanding" the post; the president deemed the apology sufficient.

=== 2022–23 season ===
Žuková and Bidař placed eighth at the 2022 Nebelhorn Trophy to start the season before placing sixth at the 2022 Skate Canada International.

In December 2022, it was announced that the pair had split.

== Programs ==
=== Pair skating with Martin Bidař (for the Czech Republic) ===
| Season | Short program | Free skating |
|---|---|---|
| 2022–2023 | Keeping Me Alive by Jonathan Roy choreo. by Benoit Richaud | So Far by Ólafur Arnalds & Arnor Dan choreo. by Benoit Richaud |
| 2021–2022 | Boom Boom by 2WEI choreo. by Benoit Richaud | So Far by Ólafur Arnalds & Arnor Dan choreo. by Benoit Richaud |
| 2020–2021 | Prologue (from West Side Story) by Leonard Bernstein choreo. by Dmitri Savin | Ave Maria by Franz Schubert arranged by Rob Tyger, Kay Denar performed by Sarah Connor choreo. by Dmitri Savin |

=== Pair skating with Egor Britkov (for Russia) ===
| Season | Short program | Free skating |
|---|---|---|
| 2017–2018 | Moon River by Henry Mancini performed by Andy Williams choreo. by Anton Milovanov | La califfa by Ennio Morricone; Mythic by Two Steps from Hell choreo. by Alexei Kudrin |

== Competitive highlights ==
=== Pair skating with Martin Bidař (for the Czech Republic) ===
Competition placements at senior level
| Season | 2019–20 | 2020–21 | 2021–22 | 2022–23 |
|---|---|---|---|---|
| Winter Olympics | | | 17th | |
| Winter Olympics (Team event) | | | 8th | |
| World Championships | | 15th | | |
| European Championships | | | 12th | |
| Czech Championships | 1st | 1st | | |
| Four Nationals Championships | (Note: As Jelizaveta Žuková had not yet been released from Russia to compete internationally, she and Martin Bidař competed in the Czech Championships, but not the Four Nationals Championships.) | 1st | | |
| GP Skate Canada | | | | 6th |
| CS Finlandia Trophy | | | 9th | |
| CS Nebelhorn Trophy | | 4th | | 8th |
| CS Warsaw Cup | | | 12th | |
| Autumn Talents Cup | | | 1st | |
| Challenge Cup | | 4th | | |

=== Pair skating with Egor Britkov (for Russia) ===
International: Junior
| Event | 2015–16 | 2016–17 | 2017–18 |
|---|---|---|---|
| Golden Spin | | | 2nd |
National
| Russian Champ. | | 9th | |
| Russian Junior | 10th | 4th | |

== Detailed results ==
=== Pair skating with Martin Bidař (for the Czech Republic) ===
ISU personal best scores in the +5/-5 GOE System
| Segment | Type | Score | Event |
|---|---|---|---|
| Total | TSS | 159.73 | 2022 European Championships |
| Short program | TSS | 60.88 | 2021 CS Warsaw Cup |
| Short program | TES | 33.80 | 2021 CS Warsaw Cup |
| Short program | PCS | 27.69 | 2022 Winter Olympics (Team event) |
| Free skating | TSS | 105.33 | 2022 European Championships |
| Free skating | TES | 54.90 | 2022 European Championships |
| Free skating | PCS | 55.03 | 2022 Skate Canada International |

Results in the 2019–20 season
| Date | Event | SP | | FS | | Total | |
| Date | Event | P | Score | P | Score | P | Score |
|---|---|---|---|---|---|---|---|
| Dec 13–14, 2019 | (Czech Republic) 2020 Czech Championships (Note: As Jelizaveta Žuková had not yet been released from Russia to compete internationally, she and Martin Bidař competed in the Czech Championships, but not the Four Nationals Championships.) | 1 | 49.12 | 1 | 94.47 | 1 | 143.59 |

Results in the 2020–21 season
| Date | Event | SP | | FS | | Total | |
| Date | Event | P | Score | P | Score | P | Score |
|---|---|---|---|---|---|---|---|
| Sep 23–26, 2020 | (Germany) 2020 CS Nebelhorn Trophy | 5 | 51.20 | 4 | 91.83 | 4 | 143.03 |
| Dec 10–12, 2020 | (Poland) 2021 Four Nationals Championships | 1 | 55.83 | 1 | 87.67 | 1 | 143.50 |
| Dec 10–12, 2020 | (Poland) 2021 Czech Championships (Note: In the Czech Republic, the Czech Championships are contested as part of the Four Nationals Championships.) | 1 | —N/a | 1 | —N/a | 1 | —N/a |
| Feb 26–28, 2021 | (Netherlands) 2021 International Challenge Cup | 5 | 54.13 | 4 | 108.98 | 4 | 163.11 |
| Mar 22–28, 2021 | (Sweden) 2021 World Championships | 16 | 54.30 | 15 | 102.99 | 15 | 157.29 |

Results in the 2021–22 season
| Date | Event | SP | | FS | | Total | |
| Date | Event | P | Score | P | Score | P | Score |
|---|---|---|---|---|---|---|---|
| Oct 7–10, 2021 | (Finland) 2021 CS Finlandia Trophy | 9 | 48.36 | 10 | 93.90 | 9 | 142.26 |
| Oct 27–30, 2021 | (Ukraine) 2021 Autumn Talents Cup | 1 | 46.96 | 1 | 91.44 | 1 | 138.40 |
| Nov 17–20, 2021 | (Poland) 2021 CS Warsaw Cup | 8 | 60.88 | 12 | 96.25 | 12 | 157.13 |
| Jan 10–16, 2022 | (Estonia) 2022 European Championships | 15 | 54.40 | 10 | 105.33 | 12 | 159.73 |
| Feb 4–7, 2022 | (China) 2022 Winter Olympics (Team event) | 8 | 56.70 | —N/a | —N/a | 8 | —N/a |
| Feb 18–19, 2022 | (China) 2022 Winter Olympics | 17 | 54.64 | —N/a | —N/a | 17 | 54.64 |

Results in the 2022–23 season
| Date | Event | SP | | FS | | Total | |
| Date | Event | P | Score | P | Score | P | Score |
|---|---|---|---|---|---|---|---|
| Sep 21–24, 2022 | (Germany) 2022 CS Nebelhorn Trophy | 9 | 49.67 | 8 | 97.65 | 8 | 147.32 |
| Oct 28–30, 2022 | 2022 Skate Canada International | 6 | 52.84 | 7 | 100.66 | 6 | 153.50 |
