= James Min =

Australian figure skater

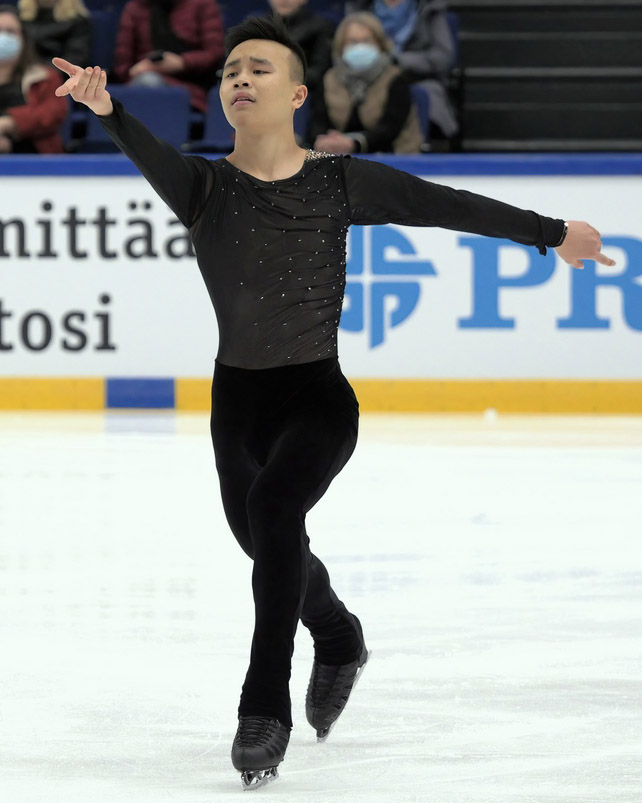
- Min at the 2021 Finlandia Trophy

Personal information
- Born: 13 September 2000 (age 25) Adelaide, South Australia
- Height: 1.68 m (5 ft 6 in)

Figure skating career
- Country: Australia
- Coach: George Galanis
- Skating club: Silver Blades FSC
- Began skating: 2007
- Retired: 30 November 2022

James Min (born 13 September 2000) is an Australian former figure skater. He is a two-time Australian national silver medalist (2016, 2019).

On the junior level, he is the 2015 Jégvirág Cup silver medalist, and a three-time Australian junior national champion (2014-2016).

He reached the free skate of the 2020 and 2022 Four Continents Championships.

In May 2024, following the U.S. Center for SafeSport's banning of fellow Australian men's singles skater, Brendan Kerry, from having any involvement in activities under the jurisdiction of the United States Olympic & Paralympic Committee following a thorough investigation on claims of sexual misconduct. In light of this, Min wrote a lengthy post on his Facebook, criticizing the lack of protective measures implemented in Australia to protect the safety of children in sport. In that same post, he also alleged that he had been groomed by an adult from the figure skating world when he was still a child. Min also brought up the years of trauma he suffered throughout his figure skating career because of this.

== Programs ==
Season	Short program	Free skating
2021–2022	Fire on Fire by Sam Smith choreo. by Irina Stavrovskaia	To Build a Home by The Cinematic Orchestra; O (Fly On) by Coldplay choreo. by Irina Stavrovskaia
2020–2021	Moonlight Sonata by Ludwig van Beethoven choreo. by Irina Stavrovskaia	Past Tundra by Valgeir Sigurðsson choreo. by Irina Stavrovskaia
2019–2020	Moonlight Sonata by Ludwig van Beethoven choreo. by Irina Stavrovskaia	Past Tundra by Valgeir Sigurðsson choreo. by Irina Stavrovskaia
2018–2019	What a Wonderful World by Bob Thiele, George David Weiss performed by OneRepublic choreo. by Maria & Evgeni Borounov	The Fifth Element by Éric Serra choreo. by Maria & Evgeni Borounov
2017–2018	What a Wonderful World by Bob Thiele, George David Weiss performed by OneRepublic choreo. by Maria & Evgeni Borounov	The Fifth Element by Éric Serra choreo. by Maria & Evgeni Borounov
2016–2017	Jumpin' Jack by Big Bad Voodoo Daddy choreo. by M. and E. Borounov, R. Laidlaw, J. Min	Totem by Guy Dubuc, Marc Lessard choreo. by M. and E. Borounov, R. Laidlaw, J. Min
2015–2016	The Prayer performed by Anthony Callea choreo. by Richard Laidlaw, James Min	The Challenge by Violet choreo. by Richard Laidlaw, James Min
2014–2015	You Raise Me Up by Secret Garden performed by Harrison Craig choreo. by Richard Laidlaw, James Min, Sean Abram	Ice Symphony; Art on Ice by Edvin Marton choreo. by Richard Laidlaw, James Min, Sean Abram

== Competitive highlights ==
International
Event	14-15	15-16	16–17	17–18	18–19	19–20	21–22
Four Continents						19th	15th
CS Asian Open					8th	8th	
CS Finlandia Trophy							23rd
CS Lombardia Trophy				18th			
Asian Open Trophy				7th			
Cup of Nice							WD
International: Junior
Junior Worlds	31st	27th	39th	29th			
JGP Australia				9th			
JGP Belarus				17th			
JGP Canada					16th		
JGP Croatia		12th					
JGP Estonia	23rd						
JGP Japan	16th		15th				
JGP U.S.		18th					
Asian Open Trophy		7th	5th				
Jégvirág Cup	2nd						
National
Australian Champ.			2nd	4th	3rd	2nd	C
Australian Junior Champ.	1st J	1st J	1st J				
