= Peter James Hallam =

English figure skater (born 1995)

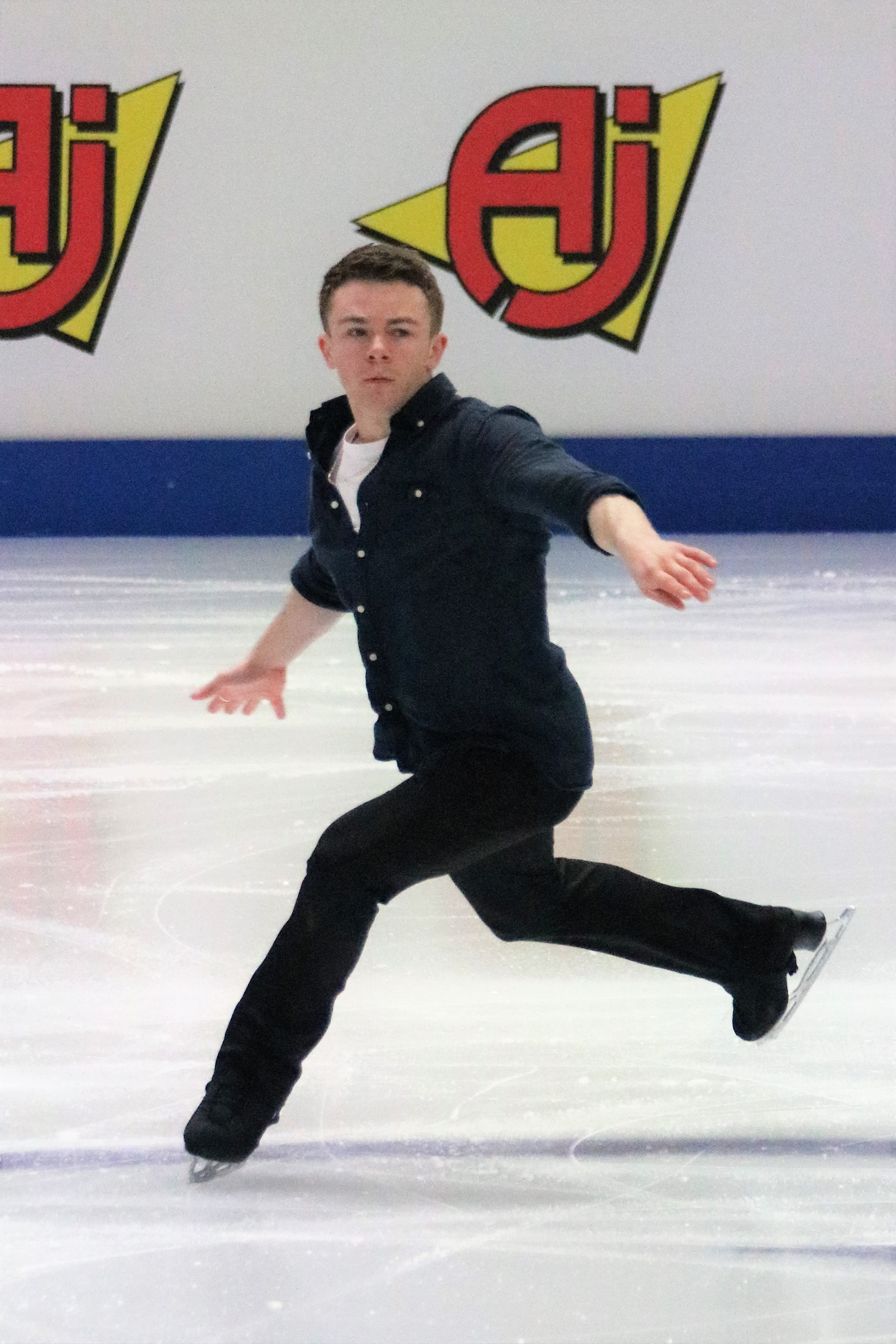
- Hallam at the 2020 European Championships

Personal information
- Born: 7 May 1995 (age 31) Sheffield, England
- Height: 162 cm (5 ft 4 in)

Figure skating career
- Country: Great Britain
- Coach: Dawn Peckett
- Skating club: IceSheffield
- Began skating: 2004
- Retired: 6 December 2021

Peter James Hallam (born 7 May 1995) is an English retired figure skater. He is the 2018 Toruń Cup silver medalist, the 2015 Golden Bear of Zagreb silver medalist, the 2019 Bavarian Open bronze medalist, the 2019 British national champion, and a six-time British national silver medalist (2014–2018, 2022).

== Career ==
Hallam began learning to skate in 2004. He competed at four ISU Junior Grand Prix events, from 2011 to 2013, and won the British junior men's title in the 2012–13 season.

Hallam's senior international debut came at the Bavarian Open in February 2014. He won his first senior national medal, silver, at the British Championships in November 2014. In November 2015, he stood on his first senior international podium, taking silver at the Golden Bear of Zagreb in Croatia. In January 2018, he won silver at the Toruń Cup in Poland.

In February 2019, Hallam won bronze at the Bavarian Open in Germany. He was chosen to represent the U.K. at the 2019 World Championships, in Saitama, Japan.

He announced his retirement on 6 December 2021.

== Programs ==
Season	Short program	Free skating
2019–2021	Footloose by Kenny Loggins	City Lights; Modern Times by Charlie Chaplin
2018–2019	Smooth Criminal by Michael Jackson	Robin Hood: Prince of Thieves by Michael Kamen
2013–2014	The Blues Brothers	Gladiator by Hans Zimmer, Lisa Gerrard
2012–2013	Avatar by James Horner	Gladiator by Hans Zimmer, Lisa Gerrard
2011–2012	Avatar by James Horner	Pearl Harbor by Hans Zimmer

== Competitive highlights ==
CS: Challenger Series; JGP: Junior Grand Prix

International
Event	09–10	10–11	11–12	12–13	13–14	14–15	15–16	16–17	17–18	18–19	19–20	20–21	21–22
Worlds										25th	C	30th	
Europeans											27th	C	
CS Autumn Classic											WD		
CS Lombardia											8th		
CS Nebelhorn													12th
Bavarian Open						7th	4th			3rd			
Challenge Cup										4th	11th		
Cup of Nice													10th
Golden Bear							2nd			4th	6th		
Tayside Trophy											1st		3rd
Toruń Cup									2nd	4th			
Volvo Open Cup									6th				
International: Junior
JGP Austria			16th										
JGP Belarus					7th								
JGP France				13th									
JGP Slovenia				19th									
Ice Challenge			1st	3rd									
Challenge Cup			1st										
National
British Champ.	4th J	3rd J	4th J	1st J	2nd J	2nd	2nd	2nd	2nd	2nd	1st	C	2nd
TBD = Assigned; WD = Withdrew; C = Event cancelled J = Junior level
