= 4th Crunchyroll Anime Awards =

2020 award ceremony

- Awarded for: Excellence in anime
- Date: February 15, 2020
- Country: United States
- Presented by: Crunchyroll
- Hosted by: Xavier Woods; Tim Lyu

Highlights
- Most wins: Demon Slayer: Kimetsu no Yaiba and Kaguya-sama: Love Is War (3)
- Most nominations: Carole & Tuesday, Demon Slayer: Kimetsu no Yaiba, and Vinland Saga (9)
- Anime of the Year: Demon Slayer: Kimetsu no Yaiba

The 4th Crunchyroll Anime Awards were held on February 15, 2020, honoring excellence in anime from 2019. Crunchyroll announced the categories and the list of judges for the 2020 awards on December 17, while also noting that the list was still not complete. They also noted that they've increased their judges by over 50%, with more than half of them coming from outside the United States. Nominees were announced on the first day of voting, January 10. Voting ran until January 17, with the results announced on February 15. The show was hosted by WWE wrestler Xavier Woods and Tim Lyu. Several personalities in the anime community were invited to present the awards.

There were 18 categories. Best Couple was reinstated after being absent in the last two editions. Best Score, Best Drama, and Best Comedy were also reinstated after being absent in the last year's edition. Best Film and Best Continuing Series were dropped. A new category, Best Fantasy, was introduced. Carole & Tuesday, Demon Slayer: Kimetsu no Yaiba, and Vinland Saga each received nine nominations, including the Anime of the Year. Mamoru Miyano was nominated for the second straight time in the Best VA Performance (JP) award. Japanese singer Aimer received her third nomination, the second consecutive, in the Best Ending Sequence category. Australian composer Kevin Penkin received his second nomination for Best Score. Carole & Tuesday's opening and ending themes, both sung by Nai Br.XX and Celeina Ann, were nominated in their respective categories.

Demon Slayer: Kimetsu no Yaiba won the Anime of the Year award. Its main protagonist, Tanjiro Kamado, won Best Boy. He also was nominated in the Best Protagonist category, only to lose to Senku Ishigami of Dr. Stone. Demon Slayer is tied with Kaguya-sama: Love Is War in receiving the most wins. Kaguya-sama also won Best Comedy and Best Ending Sequence. Vinland Saga won Best Drama, while The Promised Neverland won the inaugural Best Fantasy award. The second season of Mob Psycho 100 won Best Animation and Best Opening Sequence. Canadian composer Mocky won the Best Score award for his work on Carole & Tuesday. George Wada, an anime producer and the president of Wit Studio, received the Industry Icon award.

== Winners and nominees ==
Winners are listed first, highlighted in boldface, and indicated with a double dagger (‡). The lists are arranged alphabetically, except for the winner.

**Anime of the Year**: **Demon Slayer: Kimetsu no Yaiba — Ufotable**‡; Carole & Tuesday — Bones; Mob Psycho 100 II (season 2) — Bones; O Maidens in Your Savage Season — Lay-duce; The Promised Neverland — CloverWorks; Vinland Saga — Wit Studio	**Best Protagonist**: **Senku Ishigami — Dr. Stone**‡; Emma — The Promised Neverland; Hyakkimaru — Dororo; Saitama — One-Punch Man (season 2); Tanjiro Kamado — Demon Slayer: Kimetsu no Yaiba; Tohru Honda — Fruits Basket
**Best Antagonist**: **Isabella — The Promised Neverland**‡; Ai Magase — Babylon; Angela Carpenter — Carole & Tuesday; Askeladd — Vinland Saga; Garou — One-Punch Man (season 2); Overhaul — My Hero Academia (season 4)	**Best Boy**: **Tanjiro Kamado — Demon Slayer: Kimetsu no Yaiba**‡; Bruno Bucciarati — JoJo's Bizarre Adventure: Golden Wind (season 4); Hyakkimaru — Dororo; Kanata Hoshijima — Astra Lost in Space; Naruzo Machio — How Heavy Are the Dumbbells You Lift?; Shigeo "Mob" Kageyama — Mob Psycho 100 II (season 2)
**Best Girl**: **Raphtalia — The Rising of the Shield Hero**‡; Carole — Carole & Tuesday; Chika Fujiwara — Kaguya-sama: Love Is War; Emma — The Promised Neverland; Kohaku — Dr. Stone; Nezuko Kamado — Demon Slayer: Kimetsu no Yaiba	**Best Opening Sequence**: **"99.9" by Mob Choir feat. Sajou no Hana — Mob Psycho 100 II (season 2)**‡; "Inferno" by Mrs. Green Apple — Fire Force; "Kawaki wo Ameku" by Minami — Domestic Girlfriend; "Kiss Me" by Nai Br.XX & Celeina Ann — Carole & Tuesday; "Mukanjyo" by Survive Said The Prophet — Vinland Saga; "Touch Off" by UVERworld — The Promised Neverland
**Best Ending Sequence**: **"Chikatto Chika Chikaa♡" by Konomi Kohara — Kaguya-sama: Love Is War**‡; "Hold Me Now" by Nai Br.XX & Celeina Ann — Carole & Tuesday; "Sayonara Gokko" by amazarashi — Dororo; "Stand by Me" by the peggies — Sarazanmai; "Torches" by Aimer — Vinland Saga; "veil" by Keina Suda — Fire Force	**Best VA Performance (JP)**: **Yuichi Nakamura as Bruno Bucciarati — JoJo's Bizarre Adventure: Golden Wind (season 4)**‡; Mamoru Miyano as Reo Niiboshi — Sarazanmai; Saori Hayami as Shinobu Kochō — Demon Slayer: Kimetsu no Yaiba; Yukino Satsuki as Ai Magase — Babylon; Yusuke Kobayashi as Senku Ishigami — Dr. Stone; Yūko Kaida as Isabella — The Promised Neverland
**Best VA Performance (EN)**: **Billy Kametz as Naofumi Iwatani — The Rising of the Shield Hero**‡; Casey Mongillo as Shinji Ikari — Neon Genesis Evangelion; Erica Mendez as Retsuko — Aggretsuko (season 2); Faye Mata as Aqua — KonoSuba: God's Blessing on This Wonderful World!; Kyle McCarley as Shigeo "Mob" Kageyama — Mob Psycho 100 II (season 2); Laura Bailey as Tohru Honda — Fruits Basket	**Best Director**: **Tetsurō Araki and Masashi Koizuka — Attack on Titan (season 3)**‡; Kiyotaka Suzuki — Babylon; Kunihiko Ikuhara — Sarazanmai; Shinichirō Watanabe and Motonobu Hori — Carole & Tuesday; Shuhei Yabuta — Vinland Saga; Yuzuru Tachikawa — Mob Psycho 100 II (season 2)
**Best Animation**: **Mob Psycho 100 II** **(season 2) — Bones**‡; Attack on Titan (season 3) — Wit Studio; Demon Slayer: Kimetsu no Yaiba — Ufotable; Fate/Grand Order – Absolute Demonic Front: Babylonia — CloverWorks; Sarazanmai — MAPPA / Lapin Track; Vinland Saga — Wit Studio	**Best Character Design**: **Satoshi Iwataki, original design by Hiroyuki Asada — Dororo**‡; Kayoko Ishikawa, original design by Miggy — Sarazanmai; Takahiko Abiru, original design by Makoto Yukimura — Vinland Saga; Tsunenori Saito, original design by Eisaku Kubonouchi — Carole & Tuesday; Yuko Iwasa, original design by Boichi — Dr. Stone; Yuko Yahiro, original design by Aka Akasaka — Kaguya-sama: Love Is War
**Best Fight Scene**: **Tanjiro & Nezuko vs. Rui — Demon Slayer: Kimetsu no Yaiba**‡; Emperor Crimson vs. Metallic — JoJo's Bizarre Adventure: Golden Wind (season 4); Levi vs. Beast Titan — Attack on Titan (season 3); Mob vs. Toichiro — Mob Psycho 100 II (season 2); Thorfinn vs. Thorkell — Vinland Saga; Ushiwakamaru vs. Tiamat — Fate/Grand Order – Absolute Demonic Front: Babylonia	**Best Drama**: **Vinland Saga** — **Wit Studio**‡; Babylon — Revoroot; Carole & Tuesday — Bones; Fruits Basket — TMS Entertainment; Stars Align — Eight Bit; The Promised Neverland — CloverWorks
**Best Comedy**: **Kaguya-sama: Love Is War** — **A-1 Pictures**‡; Aggretsuko (season 2) — Fanworks; How Heavy Are the Dumbbells You Lift? — Doga Kobo; Isekai Quartet — Studio Puyukai; My Roommate Is a Cat — Zero-G; Sarazanmai — MAPPA / Lapin Track	**Best Score**: **Mocky — Carole & Tuesday**‡; Go Shiina and Yuki Kajiura — Demon Slayer: Kimetsu no Yaiba; Hiroyuki Sawano — Attack on Titan (season 3); Kevin Penkin — The Rising of the Shield Hero; Tatsuya Kato, Hiroaki Tsutsumi, and Yuki Kanesaka — Dr. Stone; Yugo Kanno — JoJo's Bizarre Adventure: Golden Wind (season 4)
**Best Couple**: **Kaguya Shinomiya & Miyuki Shirogane** — **Kaguya-sama: Love Is War**‡; Baki Hanma & Kozue Matsumoto — Baki; Mafuyu Sato & Ritsuka Uenoyama — Given; Reo & Mabu — Sarazanmai; Rika Zonazaki & Shun Amagi — O Maidens in Your Savage Season; Ymir & Historia — Attack on Titan (season 3)	**Best Fantasy**: **The Promised Neverland** — **CloverWorks**‡; Ascendance of a Bookworm — Ajiado; Astra Lost in Space — Lerche; Attack on Titan (season 3) — Wit Studio; Demon Slayer: Kimetsu no Yaiba — Ufotable; Sarazanmai — MAPPA / Lapin Track
**Industry Icon Award**: **George Wada**‡

== Statistics ==
Anime with multiple nominations
Nominations	Anime
9	Carole & Tuesday
9	Demon Slayer: Kimetsu no Yaiba
9	Vinland Saga
8	Sarazanmai
8	The Promised Neverland
7	Mob Psycho 100 II (season 2)
6	Attack on Titan (season 3)
5	Dr. Stone
5	Kaguya-sama: Love Is War
4	Babylon
4	Dororo
4	JoJo's Bizarre Adventure: Golden Wind (season 4)
3	Fruits Basket
3	The Rising of the Shield Hero
2	Aggretsuko (season 2)
2	Astra Lost in Space
2	Fate/Grand Order – Absolute Demonic Front: Babylonia
2	Fire Force
2	How Heavy Are the Dumbbells You Lift?
2	O Maidens in Your Savage Season
2	One-Punch Man (season 2)

Anime with multiple wins
Wins	Anime
3	Demon Slayer: Kimetsu no Yaiba
3	Kaguya-sama: Love Is War
2	Mob Psycho 100 II (season 2)
2	The Promised Neverland
2	The Rising of the Shield Hero
