= Shun Sato (figure skater) =

Japanese figure skater (born 2004)

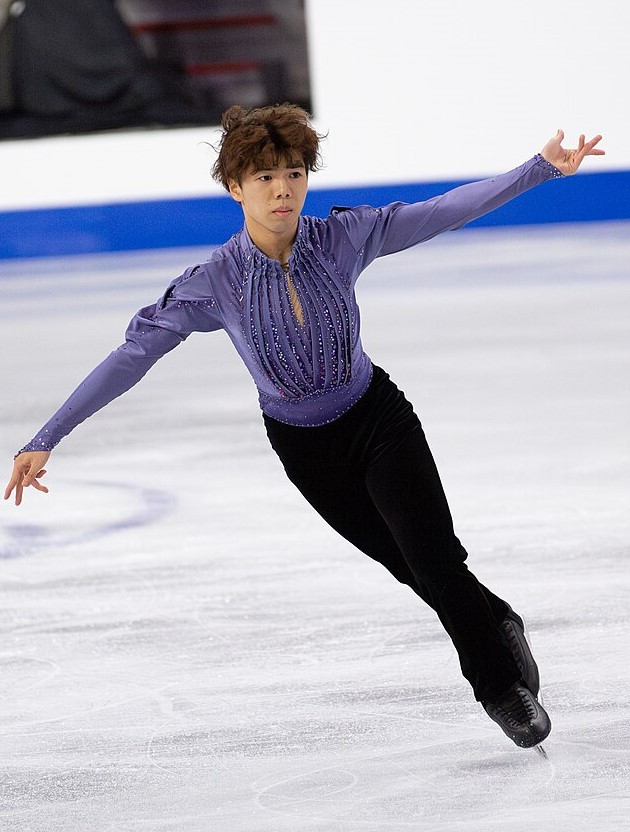
- Sato performing his short program at 2024 Skate Canada International

Personal information
- Native name: 佐藤 駿
- Born: February 6, 2004 (age 22) Sendai, Japan
- Home town: Saitama
- Height: 1.62 m (5 ft 4 in)

Figure skating career
- Country: Japan
- Discipline: Men's singles
- Coach: Tadao Kusaka; Keiko Asano
- Skating club: AIM Services; Meiji University
- Began skating: 2009

Medal record
Olympic Games
Silver medal – second place	2026 Milano Cortina	Team
Bronze medal – third place	2026 Milano Cortina	Singles
World Championships
Bronze medal – third place	2026 Prague	Singles
Four Continents Championships
Silver medal – second place	2024 Shanghai	Singles
Bronze medal – third place	2023 Colorado Springs	Singles
Grand Prix Final
Bronze medal – third place	2024–25 Grenoble	Singles
Bronze medal – third place	2025–26 Nagoya	Singles
Japan Championships
Silver medal – second place	2025–26 Tokyo	Singles
World Team Trophy
Silver medal – second place	2025 Tokyo	Team
Bronze medal – third place	2023 Tokyo	Team
Junior Grand Prix Final
Gold medal – first place	2019–20 Turin	Singles

Shun Sato (佐藤 駿, Satō Shun; born February 6, 2004) is a Japanese figure skater. He is a 2026 Olympic Games team event silver medalist, 2026 Olympic bronze medalist in the individual event, 2026 World bronze medalist, two-time Four Continents medalist (silver in 2024, bronze in 2023), a two-time Grand Prix Final bronze medalist, a nine-time Grand Prix medalist, a two-time ISU Challenger Series silver medalist, and the 2025–26 Japanese national silver medalist.

At the junior level, Sato is the 2019–20 Junior Grand Prix Final champion, and a two-time Japan Junior national silver medalist. He is also the former junior world record holder for the men's free skating and combined total score and is known for his jumping prowess.

== Personal life ==
Sato was born on February 6, 2004, in Sendai, Japan. He and his family moved to Saitama in 2018 after Sato's father got a job transfer.

Sato's figure skating idol is fellow Sendai native Yuzuru Hanyu, who gave him a bow-and-arrow pendant when Sato was five years old in return for the plush toy and fan letter Sato had thrown to him at the 2009 All-Japan Junior Championships in Shin-Yokohama.

After graduating from Saitama Sakae High School, he enrolled into Meiji University in 2023, where he currently studies at the School of Political Science and Economics.

== Career ==
=== Early career ===
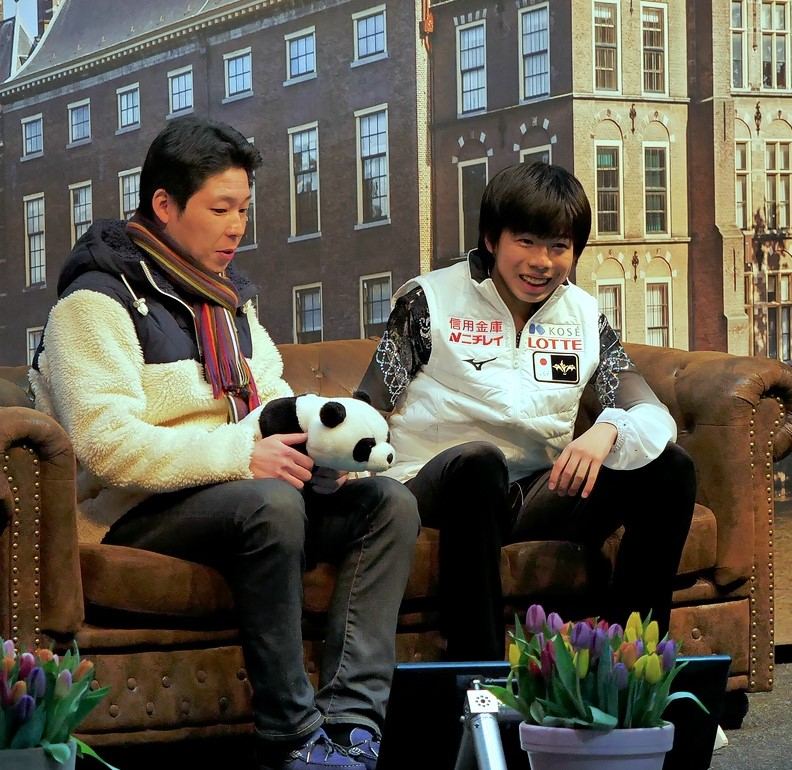
Sato with longtime coach, Tadao Kusaka, at the 2019 Challenge Cup

Sato began skating in 2009 at the age of five, and his first figure skating coach was Suguru Namioka. In 2011, Sato temporarily moved his training to Saitama after he and his family were forced to evacuate Sendai following the Tōhoku earthquake and tsunami. In 2018, he returned to Saitama; where Tadao Kusaka began coaching him.

He is a four-time Japanese national novice champion and the 2018–19 Japanese national junior silver medalist. On the junior level, Sato is also the 2018 Bavarian Open silver medalist and the 2019 International Challenge Cup champion.

As the four-time Japanese national novice champion, Sato was invited to skate in the gala at the 2015 NHK Trophy, 2016 NHK Trophy and 2017 World Team Trophy. He was also invited to skate in the gala at the 2019 World Championships as the silver medalist in the 2018 Japanese junior nationals.

=== 2019–2020 season: JGP Final champion ===
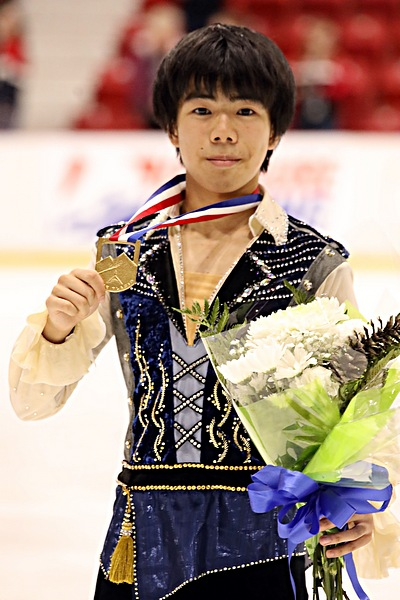
Sato at 2019 JGP United States

Sato won the gold medal in his Junior Grand Prix debut at 2019 JGP United States, ahead of reigning JGP Final champion Stephen Gogolev of Canada. He then won bronze at 2019 JGP Croatia. Sato's results qualified him to the 2019–20 Junior Grand Prix Final. At the JGP Final, he set new junior world records for the free skating and the combined score en route to winning the gold medal, ahead of Russians Andrei Mozalev and Daniil Samsonov. He remarked: "I was surprised that I could win here."

Sato won the silver medal at the 2019–20 Japan Junior Championships, behind Yuma Kagiyama and ahead of Lucas Tsuyoshi Honda. As a result, he was invited to compete in the senior division at the 2019–20 Japan Championships, alongside the rest of the top six finishers in the junior division. Sato placed fifth in the senior event and was named to the team for the 2020 World Junior Championships with Kagiyama and placed sixth there.

=== 2020–2021 season: International senior debut ===
Competing domestically, Sato won the silver medal at the Kanto Regional championship and then the gold medal at the Eastern Sectional championship, thus qualifying for a berth at the national championship. Making his Grand Prix debut at the 2020 NHK Trophy, Sato placed fifth. He was fifth as well at the 2020–21 Japan Championships.

=== 2021–2022 season: First Grand Prix medal ===
Sato started the season competing at 2021 Japan Open, where he placed second in the men's free program after landing four quadruple jumps for the first time and won the gold medal with his teammates. He was then assigned to participate in the 2021 Asian Open Trophy, which served as a test event for the 2022 Winter Olympics, where he won a silver medal with unofficial personal bests in the short program and total score.

At his first Grand Prix event, 2021 Skate America, Sato dislocated his left acromioclavicular joint on a fall during practice. He thought about withdrawing, but despite severe pain, he decided to compete with the help of painkillers and without changing his planned programs' layout. He placed fifth in the short program and fourth in the free skate and overall. At this second event, the 2021 Internationaux de France, Sato was fourth in the short program and third in the free skate, taking the silver medal overall, his first on the Grand Prix. Reflecting on his performance, he said that he was "really happy to be on the podium for the first time, but I need to catch up to Yuma, so I will work hard."

At the 2021–22 Japan Championships, Sato finished in seventh place. He was assigned to compete at the 2022 World Junior Championships. He subsequently declined to compete in the World Junior Championships due to his left shoulder injury and was replaced by Lucas Tsuyoshi Honda.

=== 2022–2023 season: Grand Prix Final and Four Continents bronze ===
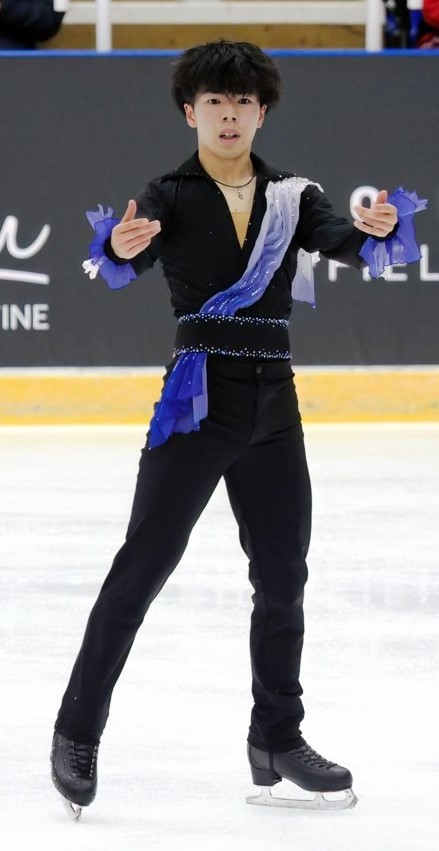
Sato performing his short program at the 2022 MK John Wilson Trophy

Given two Grand Prix assignments, Sato began the season at the 2022 MK John Wilson Trophy. He was narrowly fourth in the short program, finished third in the free skate, and took the bronze medal. Despite a fall on his quad Lutz attempt in the free skate, he said, "the mistakes I made didn't affect my performance, and I went through until the end. So I'm quite happy about it." At his second event, the 2022 Grand Prix of Espoo, Sato fell on his quad Lutz attempt, finishing third in that segment. Needing at least a second place to qualify for the Grand Prix Final, Sato rallied in the free skate, placing second in that segment and rising to second overall. Celebrating his successful qualification, he said it "always has been a dream of mine, but I couldn't go with the cancellations. I put a lot of effort into trying to make the Grand Prix Final."

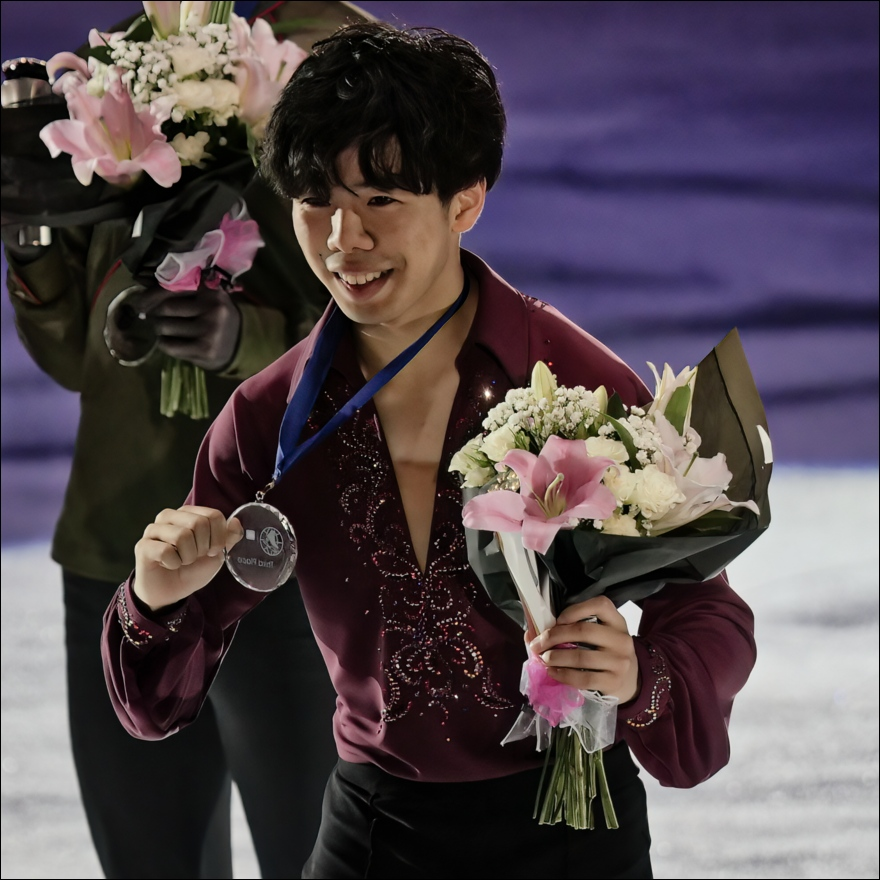
Sato during the medal ceremony at the 2022 MK John Wilson Trophy

Competing at the Final in Turin, Sato placed sixth of six skaters in the short program after falling on his opening quad Lutz attempt and performing only a quad-double jump combination. He rallied in the free skate, moving up to fourth overall. He was fourth as well at the 2022–23 Japan Championships, finishing 1.20 points back of bronze medalist Kazuki Tomono. He was named first alternate for the 2023 World Championships, and assigned to compete at both the 2023 Winter World University Games and the 2023 Four Continents Championships.

Sato was third in the short program at the University Games, but dropped to fifth after the free skate. He was sixth in the short program at the Four Continents Championships after jump errors. A clean free skate, but for an edge call on a triple flip jump, saw him place third in that segment and rise to third overall, taking the bronze medal. Sato noted his change of fortunes, commenting that "last year at this time I was undergoing surgery and right now a year later I won third place at Four Continents." He said that the short program errors that had been plaguing him all season were an area of focus going forward. He then won gold at the International Challenge Cup.

With national champion Shoma Uno suffering from an ankle injury and withdrawing from the 2023 World Team Trophy as a result, Sato was named to replace him on Team Japan. In the short program he fell on his quad Lutz attempt and managed only a quad-double jump combination, placing eleventh in the segment. He improved in the free skate, coming eighth, and sharing in Team Japan's bronze medal.

=== 2023–2024 season: Four Continents silver ===
Sato won the silver medal at the 2023 CS Finlandia Trophy, his first competition of the season. He began the Grand Prix at the 2023 Skate America. Despite stepping out of his quad flip attempt in the short program, he broke the 90-point barrier in the segment for the first time (91.61) and finished third in the segment. In the free skate he landed only one of three quads cleanly, coming fourth in the segment, but he remained in third place overall and won the bronze medal. “I was glad to be able to finish on the podium here, but I was looking really tired in the second half of my program,” Sato admitted after the free skate. “I hope to be in great shape for my second assignment in Finland.” Sato was second in the short program at the 2023 Grand Prix of Espoo, but won the free skate with a new personal best score of 182.93; however, he remained second overall, 1.22 points behind Kao Miura. Sato said he was "happy to give a good performance for my fans and I hope to keep the momentum."

At the 2023–24 Japan Championships, Sato finished fifth, saying he was both "happy and frustrated" with his results at the event. Despite this placement, he was assigned to compete at the 2024 Four Continents Championships in Shanghai, where he came second in the short program with a new personal best score. He performed a quad Lutz as his second jump in the program, a decision he had been uncertain about earlier, and said he was glad to have kept. Sato was third in the free skate, but remained in second place overall, claiming the silver medal.

=== 2024–2025 season: Grand Prix Final bronze ===
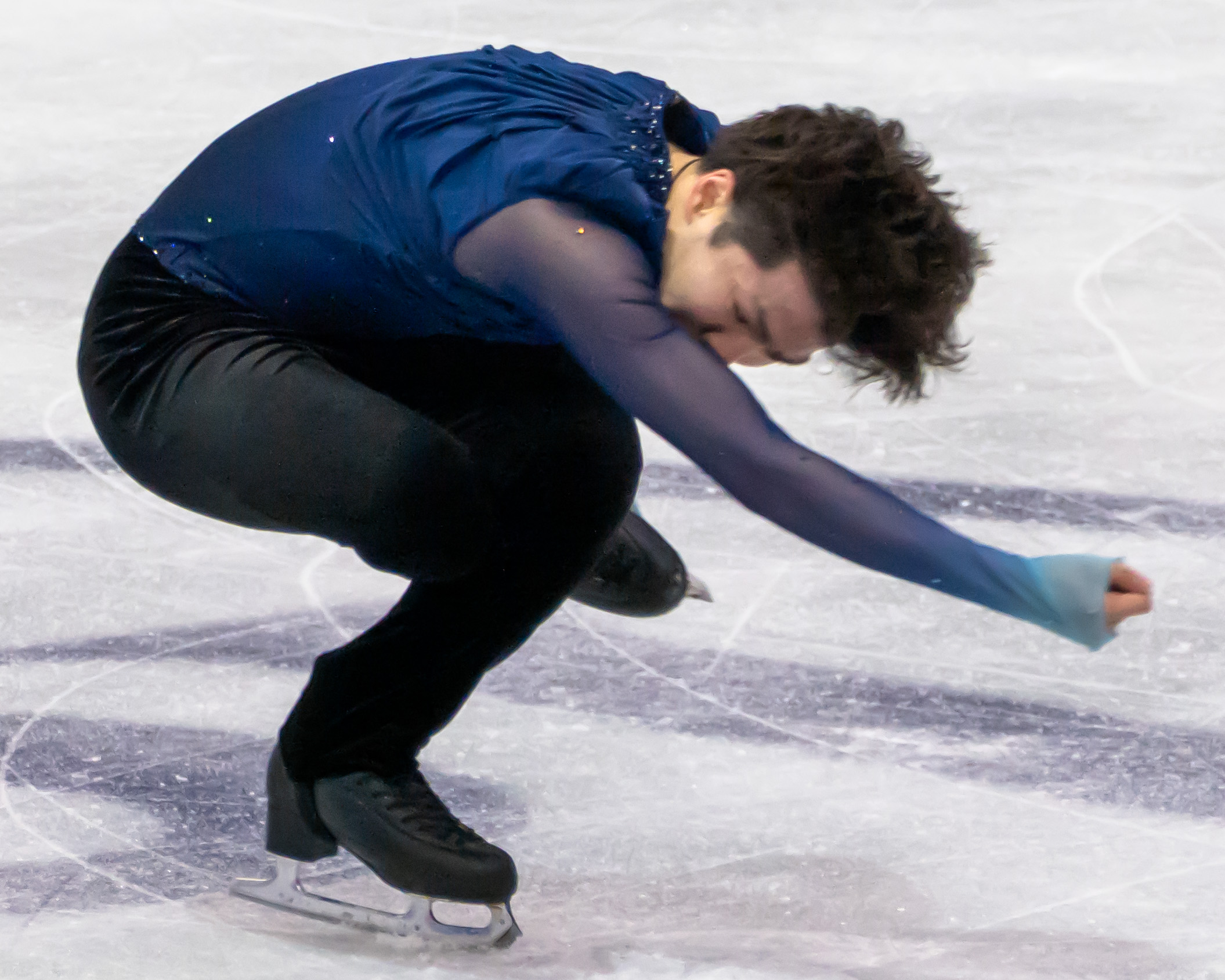
Sato performing a back sit spin during his free skate at the 2025 World Championships

Sato began the season by competing at the 2024 CS Lombardia Trophy, where he won the bronze medal behind reigning World gold and silver medalists, Ilia Malinin and Yuma Kagiyama. Going on to compete on the 2024–25 Grand Prix circuit, Sato won the silver medal at the 2024 Skate Canada International. “I made some mistakes on my jumps which was disappointing,” said Sato. “On the other hand, I was very glad that I was able to land my quad flip. So, I think that this one was a good event that bodes well for my next event. Four weeks later, at the 2024 Cup of China, Sato would win the short program following a clean skate. During the free program, Sato would pop a planned quad flip into a double, but managed to land his three other quad attempts and two triple axels. Although he was second in the free skate segment, Sato managed to hold onto the gold medal position overall.

Sato's results on the Grand Prix series allowed him to qualify for the 2024–25 Grand Prix Final in Grenoble, France. At the Final, he placed fourth in the short program after falling on a quadruple lutz attempt. In the free skate, Sato would land three clean quad jumps and earn the highest technical score out of all the men in the event. He would place third in that segment and win the bronze medal overall behind Ilia Malinin and Yuma Kagiyama. After the free skate, he said "It’s been two years since I was in the Final. I think it’s a good experience and because the Japanese National Championships are coming up, I’d like to train well for it. There is not much time until the nationals, but I will take away the lessons I learned from this event, especially in the short program where I made mistakes.”

Two weeks later, Sato competed at the 2024–25 Japan Championships, where he faltered during his short and free program, finishing a disappointing seventh place overall. Following his free skate, Sato began hyperventilating and required medical attention. In spite of this result, Sato was named to the World team due to his strong results on the Grand Prix circuit.

The following month, Sato placed fifth at the 2025 Winter World University Games in Turin, Italy. In late February, he also finished fifth at the 2025 Asian Winter Games in Harbin, China.

In March, at the 2025 World Championships in Boston, he successfully landed a quadruple Lutz in the short program and placed fifth in that segment. In the free skate, he landed another quad Lutz, then received an edge call on a quadruple flip jump and had a fall on a quadruple toe loop. With no other major mistakes, he finished in sixth place overall. He said afterward, "I'm sighing with relief. For the past month, I've really been practicing like my life depended on it, so I'm glad that effort paid off. I think my performance dispelled my regrets from failing at the All-Japan Championships."

Sato finished the season by competing at the 2025 World Team Trophy for Team Japan. Despite competing with a fever, he managed to finish the event in fourth place overall with Team Japan ultimately winning the silver medal. “My condition was better than yesterday, but I struggled with the last half of the program,” said Sato. “I just wanted to get it over with after the second quad toe. At my first World Team Trophy in 2023, I was very nervous, so I wanted to have more fun this time. The cheering of my teammates really pushed me to the end of the program.”

=== 2025–2026 season: Milano Cortina Olympic Men's singles bronze, Olympic Team Event silver, Grand Prix Final bronze, and national silver ===
Sato opened his season by finishing fourth at the 2025 CS Lombardia Trophy.

Assigned to compete at the 2025 Cup of China, Sato underwent shockwave therapy to treat a right ankle injury he sustained during the summer. Despite this setback, he ultimately managed to win the event for a second consecutive time. "I am very glad that I got season's best today and with my performance overall," said Sato after the free skate. "Preparation for this competition was smooth, so I want to do the same before NHK."

Two weeks later, Sato took silver at 2025 NHK Trophy, placing close behind teammate Yuma Kagiyama. “In the free skating of course, I was really feeling great about landing all those wonderful jumps, especially the quad Lutz,” he said. “I must say that even including all the practice jumps, it was the best tonight, and so I’m really happy about that."

The following month, Sato earned his second consecutive Grand Prix Final bronze medal at the 2025–26 Grand Prix Final, picking up a new personal best in the free skate and total score. "Before going on to the ice, I was really nervous, but I heard the audience and they really energized me, " said the 21-year-old. "So, I'm really glad that I had no mistakes in my performance. Last year in the Final, I was lacking mental toughness which I have gained much more this season throughout, and I believe that is showing in the higher scores. A couple weeks later, Sato competed at the 2025–26 Japan Championships. He placed fifth in the short program after popping a planned quadruple Lutz into a triple but won the free skate, taking the silver medal overall behind Yuma Kagiyama. He was subsequently named to the 2026 Winter Olympic team.

On 8 February, Sato competed in the free skate segment of the 2026 Winter Olympics Team Event. He placed second behind Ilia Malinin with a personal best free skate score, helping Team Japan to secure a silver medal. Reflecting on being the final skater of the Team Event and Team Japan only finishing one point behind Team United States of America, he shared, "Right after I finished skating, I was genuinely happy because I felt I had truly lived up to the team’s support. But once the scores were announced, I felt quite sad that we couldn’t win. I felt happy, but also disappointed."

On 10 February, Sato competed in the short program of the Men's singles event at the 2026 Winter Olympics. He placed ninth in that segment after stepping out of his quad toe-double toe combination. "I want to reset my mindset for the free skate and do my best to skate in a good way," he said following his performance. Two days later, apart from stepping out of his final triple Lutz jump, Sato skated an almost perfect free skate that included three clean quadruple jumps. He placed third in that segment and due to several skaters that placed ahead of him in the short program struggling with their free skates, Sato managed to climb up to the bronze medal position overall. He expressed shock and elation at the final result, saying, "I'm speechless. I never thought I'd make it to the podium. It hasn't really sunk in yet, and I still think it's a dream. I made a mistake in the short program, but I wasn't dwelling on it and performed a nearly flawless free skate. It was fun." “I was ninth after the short program,” noted Sato. “I was still frustrated that I hadn’t been able to perform at my full potential. But I never gave up. Heading into the free skate, I had controlled things well in the team event, so I held onto that positive image and focused on my own performance, thinking I would do my best.”

In March, Sato completed his season at the 2026 World Championships in Prague, Czech Republic. He placed fourth in the short program and third in the free skate to climb to the bronze medal position overall behind Ilia Malinin and Yuma Kagiyama. "I’m really happy that I was able to finish in good form at the very end," he said after the free skate. "Throughout this season, I continued to deliver many clean performances. I strongly wanted to have a performance without any mistakes at the end, as well. I’m really happy that I was able to achieve that."

=== 2026–2027 season ===
Sato opened his season at the 2026 Kinoshita Group Cup where he won the silver medal.

Two months later, he competed at 2026 Cup of China where he broke the 100-mark barrier to place first in the short program. “I was really nervous before the performance, but I managed to refresh my mindset and skate well,” he said. “My condition wasn’t perfect at first, but it gradually improved after arriving here.” He went on to place fourth in the free skate and overall. "I hope I can perform better at the NHK Trophy and deliver a performance that lives up to everyone’s expectations,” said Sato.

== Programs ==
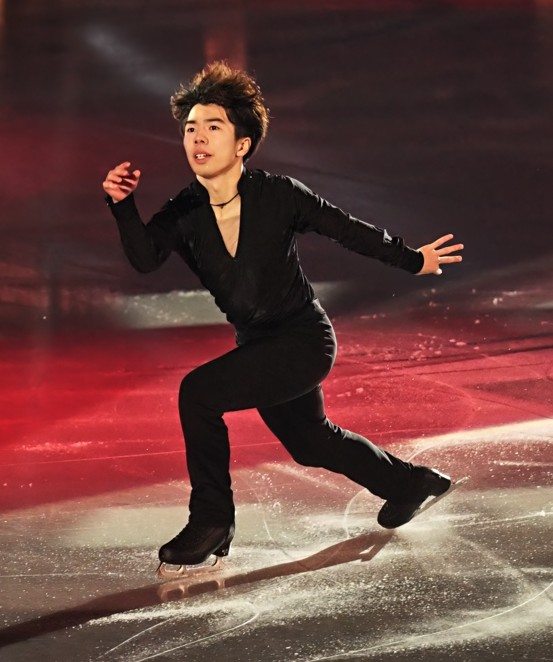
Sato performing his exhibition program at the 2024–25 Grand Prix Final

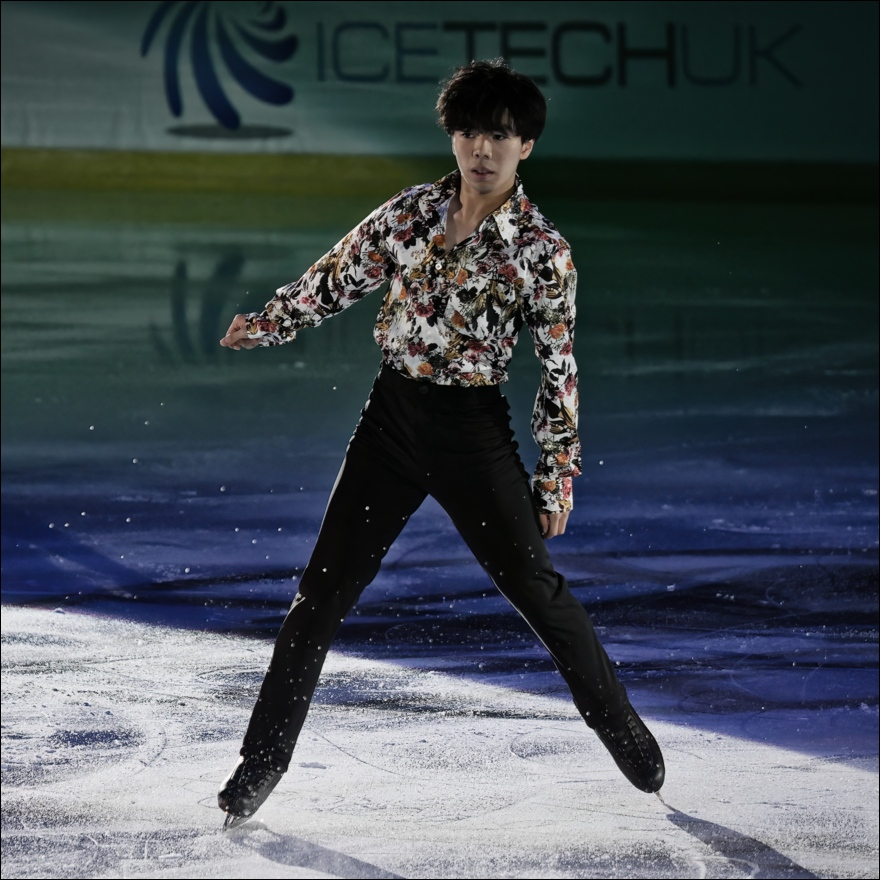
Sato performing his exhibition program at the 2022 MK John Wilson Trophy

Season	Short program	Free skating	Exhibition
2026–2027	Csárdás of Love by Vittorio Monti performed by Iwao Furusawa choreo. by Kenji Miyamoto	Poeta by Vicente Amigo choreo. by Guillaume Cizeron & Samuel Chouinard	
2025–2026	Fantasy for Violin and Orchestra (from Ladies in Lavender) by Nigel Hess & Royal Philharmonic Orchestra performed by Joshua Bell choreo. by Guillaume Cizeron	The Firebird; Dance of the Firebird; Round Dance of the Princesses; Infernal Dance of King Kashchei; Finale by Igor Stravinsky choreo. by Guillaume Cizeron	Senbonzakura by Lindsey Stirling choreo. by Satoko Miyahara
2024–2025	Fantasy for Violin and Orchestra (from Ladies in Lavender) by Nigel Hess & Royal Philharmonic Orchestra performed by Joshua Bell choreo. by Guillaume Cizeron	Nostos by Jean-Michel Blais & Devon Bate performed by Angèle Dubeau & La Pietà choreo. by Guillaume Cizeron	Rise (Leave Me Alone) by Safri Duo ft. Clark Anderson choreo. by Akiko Suzuki
2023–2024	Libertango by Astor Piazzolla performed by Héctor Ulises Passarella, Luis Bacalov, & Orchestra dell'Accademia Nazionale di Santa Cecilia choreo. by Kenji Miyamoto	The Four Seasons by Antonio Vivaldi arranged by Max Richter choreo. by Guillaume Cizeron	Secrets by OneRepublic
2022–2023	Carol of the Bells performed by Lindsey Stirling choreo. by Yuka Sato	Red Violin by Ikuko Kawai choreo. by Kenji Miyamoto	Flower Dance by DJ Okawari
2021–2022	The Four Seasons: Summer by Antonio Vivaldi choreo. by Yuka Sato	The Point of No Return; Masquerade (from The Phantom of the Opera) by Andrew Lloyd Webber; Phantasia by Julian Lloyd Webber, Geoffrey Alexander choreo. by Kenji Miyamoto	Arrivée des Camionneurs (from The Young Girls of Rochefort) by Michel Legrand choreo. by Misao Sato
2020–2021	Pirates of the Caribbean; Davy Jones & Imperial March performed by Samuel Kim; Pirates of the Caribbean performed by Peter Bence; To the Pirate's Cave/Skull and Crossbones performed by City of Prague Philharmonic Orchestra choreo. by Benoît Richaud	Battle of the Kings; House of Cards; Danuvius; Guardians at the Gate by audiomachine choreo. by Benoît Richaud	Headlight by Monkey Majik choreo. by Keiko Asano
2019–2020	Arrivée des Camionneurs (from The Young Girls of Rochefort) by Michel Legrand choreo. by Misao Sato	Romeo and Juliet by Nino Rota choreo. by Masahiro Kawagoe	Merry Christmas, Mr. Lawrence (from Merry Christmas, Mr. Lawrence) by Ryuichi Sakamoto choreo. by Masahiro Kawagoe
2018–2019	Merry Christmas, Mr. Lawrence (from Merry Christmas, Mr. Lawrence) by Ryuichi Sakamoto choreo. by Masahiro Kawagoe	Malagueña by Ernesto Lecuona choreo. by Misao Sato	Flower Dance by DJ Okawari
2017–2018	New York, New York by John Kander	Piano Concerto by Edvard Grieg	

== Competitive highlights ==
- GP – Event of the ISU Grand Prix Series
- JGP – Event of the ISU Junior Grand Prix Series
- CS – Event of the ISU Challenger Series
- TBD – Assigned
- WD – Withdrew from competition
- Medals at team events are awarded for the team results only. Individual placements at team events are listed in parentheses.

Competition placements at senior level
Season	2017–18	2018–19	2019–20	2020–21	2021–22	2022–23	2023–24	2024–25	2025–26	2026–27
Winter Olympics									3rd	
Winter Olympics (Team event)									2nd	
World Championships								6th	3rd	
Four Continents Championships						3rd	2nd			
Grand Prix Final						4th		3rd	3rd	
Japan Championships	16th	12th	5th	5th	7th	4th	5th	7th	2nd	
World Team Trophy						3rd (10th)		2nd (4th)		
GP Cup of China								1st	1st	4th
GP Finland						2nd	2nd			
GP France					2nd					
GP NHK Trophy				5th					2nd	TBD
GP Skate America					4th		3rd			
GP Skate Canada								2nd		
GP Wilson Trophy						3rd				
CS Asian Open Trophy					2nd					
CS Finlandia Trophy							2nd			
CS Lombardia Trophy								3rd	4th	
CS Kinoshita Group Cup										2nd
Bavarian Open			1st							
Challenge Cup						1st				
Japan Open					1st (2nd)					
Winter University Games						5th		5th		
Asian Games								5th		

Competition placements at junior level
Season	2015–16	2016–17	2017–18	2018–19	2019–20
World Junior Championships					6th
Junior Grand Prix Final					1st
Japan Championships	15th	15th	6th	2nd	2nd
JGP Croatia					3rd
JGP United States					1st
Bavarian Open			2nd		
Challenge Cup				1st	

== Detailed results ==
ISU personal best scores in the +5/-5 GOE System
Segment	Type	Score	Event
Total	TSS	292.08	2025–26 Grand Prix Final
Short program	TSS	101.97	2026 Cup of China
Short program	TES	59.57	2026 Cup of China
Short program	PCS	43.26	2024 CS Lombardia Trophy
Free skating	TSS	194.86	2026 Winter Olympics (Team event)
Free skating	TES	107.21	2025–26 Grand Prix Final
Free skating	PCS	88.37	2026 Winter Olympics (Team event)

- Small medals for the short program and free skating are only awarded at ISU Championships.
- Medals at team events are awarded for the team results only. Individual placements at team events are listed in parentheses.

=== Senior level ===
Results in the 2017–18 season
Date	Event	SP		FS		Total	
Date	Event	P	Score	P	Score	P	Score
Dec 20–24, 2017	2017–18 Japan Championships	20	57.77	16	127.75	16	185.52

Results in the 2018–19 season
Date	Event	SP		FS		Total	
Date	Event	P	Score	P	Score	P	Score
Dec 20–24, 2018	2018–19 Japan Championships	16	64.89	9	140.06	12	204.95

Results in the 2019–20 season
Date	Event	SP		FS		Total	
Date	Event	P	Score	P	Score	P	Score
Dec 18–22, 2019	2019–20 Japan Championships	3	82.68	6	163.82	5	246.50
Feb 3–9, 2020	(Germany) 2020 Bavarian Open	1	82.18	1	160.13	1	242.31

Results in the 2020–21 season
Date	Event	SP		FS		Total	
Date	Event	P	Score	P	Score	P	Score
Nov 27–29, 2020	(Japan) 2020 NHK Trophy	7	72.04	4	142.71	5	214.75
Dec 24–27, 2020	2020–21 Japan Championships	5	83.31	6	153.21	5	236.52

Results in the 2021–22 season
Date	Event	SP		FS		Total	
Date	Event	P	Score	P	Score	P	Score
Oct 3, 2021	2021 Japan Open	–	–	2	179.32	1	–
Oct 13–17, 2021	(China) 2021 Asian Open Trophy	2	90.77	2	165.39	2	256.16
Oct 22–24, 2021	(United States) 2021 Skate America	5	80.52	4	166.53	4	247.05
Nov 19–21, 2021	2021 Internationaux de France	4	87.82	3	177.17	2	264.99
Dec 22–26, 2021	2021–22 Japan Championships	8	87.27	6	164.86	7	252.13

Results in the 2022–23 season
Date	Event	SP		FS		Total	
Date	Event	P	Score	P	Score	P	Score
Nov 11–13, 2022	(United Kingdom) 2022 MK John Wilson Trophy	4	82.68	3	166.35	3	249.03
Nov 25–27, 2022	(Finland) 2022 Grand Prix of Espoo	3	81.59	2	180.62	2	262.21
Dec 8–11, 2022	(Italy) 2022–23 Grand Prix Final	6	76.62	4	173.54	4	250.16
Dec 21–25, 2022	2022–23 Japan Championships	5	81.78	3	167.86	4	249.64
Jan 12–22, 2023	(United States) 2023 Winter World University Games	3	84.43	5	146.30	5	230.73
Feb 7–12, 2023	(United States) 2023 Four Continents Championships	6	80.81	3	178.33	3	259.14
Feb 23–26, 2023	(Netherlands) 2023 International Challenge Cup	1	95.08	1	167.12	1	262.20
Apr 13–16, 2023	(Japan) 2023 World Team Trophy	11	76.45	8	164.86	3 (10)	241.31

Results in the 2023–24 season
Date	Event	SP		FS		Total	
Date	Event	P	Score	P	Score	P	Score
Oct 4–8, 2023	(Finland) 2023 CS Finlandia Trophy	2	87.47	2	173.76	2	261.23
Oct 20–22, 2023	(United States) 2023 Skate America	3	91.61	4	155.89	3	247.50
Nov 17–19, 2023	(Finland) 2023 Grand Prix of Espoo	2	90.41	1	182.93	2	273.34
Dec 20–24, 2023	2023–24 Japan Championships	5	89.80	6	183.24	5	273.04
Jan 30 – Feb 4, 2024	(China) 2024 Four Continents Championships	2	99.20	3	175.39	2	274.59

Results in the 2024–25 season
Date	Event	SP		FS		Total	
Date	Event	P	Score	P	Score	P	Score
Sep 12–15, 2024	(Italy) 2024 CS Lombardia Trophy	3	98.39	3	187.49	3	285.88
Oct 25–27, 2024	2024 Skate Canada International	2	96.52	4	164.64	2	261.16
Nov 22–24, 2024	2024 Cup of China	1	98.75	2	179.73	1	278.48
Dec 5–8, 2024	(France) 2024–25 Grand Prix Final	4	86.28	3	184.54	3	270.82
Dec 19–22, 2024	2024–25 Japan Championships	6	81.90	7	148.90	7	230.80
Jan 16–18, 2025	(Italy) 2025 Winter World University Games	2	96.30	6	152.20	5	248.50
Feb 11–13, 2025	(China) 2025 Asian Winter Games	5	70.02	4	162.08	5	232.10
Mar 25–30, 2025	(United States) 2025 World Championships	5	91.26	6	179.30	6	270.56
Apr 17–20, 2025	(Japan) 2025 World Team Trophy	5	93.68	4	169.62	2 (4)	263.30

Results in the 2025–26 season
Date	Event	SP		FS		Total	
Date	Event	P	Score	P	Score	P	Score
Sep 11–14, 2025	(Italy) 2025 CS Lombardia Trophy	8	78.06	3	176.08	4	254.14
Oct 24–26, 2025	2025 Cup of China	1	94.13	1	183.99	1	278.12
Nov 7–9, 2025	(Japan) 2025 NHK Trophy	2	96.67	1	189.04	2	285.71
Dec 4–6, 2025	(Japan) 2025–26 Grand Prix Final	2	98.06	3	194.02	3	292.08
Dec 18–21, 2025	2025–26 Japan Championships	5	87.99	1	188.76	2	276.75
Feb 6–8, 2026	(Italy) 2026 Winter Olympics – Team event	—N/a	—N/a	2	194.86	2	—N/a
Feb 10–13, 2026	(Italy) 2026 Winter Olympics	9	88.70	3	186.20	3	274.90
Mar 24–29, 2026	(Czech Republic) 2026 World Championships	4	95.84	3	192.70	3	288.54

Results in the 2026–27 season
Date	Event	SP		FS		Total	
Date	Event	P	Score	P	Score	P	Score
Sept 4–6, 2026	(Japan) 2026 Kinoshita Group Cup	3	85.71	5	170.21	2	255.92

=== Junior level ===
Results in the 2015–16 season
Date	Event	SP		FS		Total	
Date	Event	P	Score	P	Score	P	Score
Nov 21–23, 2015	2015–16 Japan Championships (Junior)	13	50.11	15	93.35	15	143.46

Results in the 2016–17 season
Date	Event	SP		FS		Total	
Date	Event	P	Score	P	Score	P	Score
Nov 23–25, 2016	2016–17 Japan Championships (Junior)	7	55.89	16	101.14	15	157.03

Results in the 2017–18 season
Date	Event	SP		FS		Total	
Date	Event	P	Score	P	Score	P	Score
Nov 24–26, 2017	2017–18 Japan Championships (Junior)	11	59.64	6	120.56	6	180.20
Jan 26–31, 2018	(Germany) 2018 Bavarian Open	1	63.71	3	119.63	2	183.34

Results in the 2018–19 season
Date	Event	SP		FS		Total	
Date	Event	P	Score	P	Score	P	Score
Nov 23–25, 2018	2018–19 Japan Championships (Junior)	6	66.01	1	156.29	2	222.30
Feb 21–24, 2019	(Netherlands) 2019 International Challenge Cup	1	71.17	1	128.67	1	199.84

Results in the 2019–20 season
Date	Event	SP		FS		Total	
Date	Event	P	Score	P	Score	P	Score
Aug 28–31, 2019	2019 JGP United States	1	79.19	1	137.93	1	217.12
Sep 25–28, 2019	2019 JGP Croatia	4	78.41	4	141.28	3	219.69
Nov 15–17, 2019	2019–20 Japan Championships (Junior)	3	74.19	2	139.01	2	213.20
Dec 5–8, 2019	(Italy) 2019–20 Junior Grand Prix Final	3	77.25	1	177.86	1	255.11
Mar 2–8, 2020	(Estonia) 2020 World Junior Championships	5	79.30	6	142.32	6	221.62
