= Name of Love (Cinema Staff song) =

Single by Cinema Staff

- Official song cover

Single by Cinema Staff

from the album BEST OF THE SUPER CINEMA 2008-2011/2012-2019
- Language: Japanese
- B-side: "OCEAN"; "Saraba Rakuen Yo"; "great escape (2019 new mix)"
- Released: May 29, 2019
- Recorded: 2019
- Genre: Anime song
- Length: 4:26
- Label: Pony Canyon
- Composer: Cinema Staff

Cinema Staff singles chronology
"Vektor E.P." (2018)	"Name of Love" (2019)

Limited edition cover
- Standard edition cover featuring the characters of Attack on Titan

"Name of Love" is the last single created by the Japanese band Cinema Staff, and was used as the ending theme for season three part two of the anime Attack on Titan. Announced on 3 February and released in full on 29 May 2019, the song became the first single to be released by the band in nearly two and a half years, and the second song the band created for the anime: after their ending for season one part two titled "great escape" was successful. The song has since been performed on at least two occasions by the band during musical tours across Japan, and has gained positions on the Billboard Japan and Oricon singles charts.

== Background and release ==
The song was announced by the band Cinema Staff on 3 February 2019 as the ending theme for the second half season three of the anime Attack on Titan. The announcement marked the band's first single in nearly two and a half years, their prior most recent being "Vektor E.P." released in November 2018, and the second collaboration with the anime since creating the song "great escape" for the second half of season one. A shortened version of the song was used starting 28 April 2019 for the release of season 3 part 2 of the anime, alongside the Linked Horizon opening "Shoukei to Shikabane no Michi".

The full version of the song was released on 29 May 2019 as a single across multiple music streaming and distribution services including Apple Music, Spotify, Recochoku, and iTunes. The largely vocal song was sung by band member Mizuki Iida. The single released in two artworks: one featuring the main vocalist (Mizuki Iida) standing against a monochrome background with the name of the single written in front, and a "first limited edition jacket design" which displays original artwork by Wit Studio, the anime season's animator, of some of the season's main characters. The single release also included three other songs: titled "OCEAN", "Saraba Rakuen Yo" (さらば楽園よ; lit. "Farewell to Paradise"), and "great escape (2019 new mix)" as the second, third, and fourth tracks respectively. The additional two songs were described by Tower Records as also being "reminiscent" of the anime. The song later was included in the band's one and only album, BEST OF THE SUPER CINEMA 2008-2011/2012-2019 on 18 September 2019, which was a compilation of 36 remastered versions of the band's songs, including two new songs.

== Performances ==
Upon the full version of the song's release on 29 May 2019, the band began a solo tour across Japan titled "'Name of Love' RELEASE ONE-MAN TOUR ~RE: land=ocean~" [sic] which lasted from 1 June to 21 July 2019, where the song was performed. The solo tour was also the first time in nearly three years the band had done a tour in a solo format, their prior most recent being "Oneman Tour 2016 'About Eve'" in 2016. Their first venue in Shibuya on 1 June sold out completely. On another tour across Japan in from 2 July to 5 November 2023 titled "We are Phenomenal", commemorating the band's 15-year anniversary, the song was again performed, along with their other anime song "great escape".

== Chart performance ==
Weekly chart performance for "Name of Love"
Chart (2019)	Peak position
Japan Top Singles Sales (Billboard)	41
Japan Top 200 Singles (Oricon)	39
