= Attack on Titan season 3 =

Third season of the anime television series (2018–19)

Attack on Titan
- Season 3
- No. of episodes: 22

Release
- Original network: NHK General TV
- Original release: July 23, 2018 – July 1, 2019

Season chronology
- ← Previous; Season 2 Next → Season 4

The third season of the Attack on Titan anime television series was produced by IG Port's Wit Studio, chief directed by Tetsurō Araki and directed by Masashi Koizuka, with Yasuko Kobayashi handling series composition and Kyōji Asano providing character designs. It covers the "Royal Government" (chapters 51–72) and "Return to Shiganshina" (chapters 73–90) arcs from the original manga by Hajime Isayama. The season's first 12 episodes were broadcast on NHK General TV from July 23 to October 15, 2018, before going into hiatus until April 29, 2019. Adult Swim began airing Funimation's English dub on August 18, 2018.

The season follows Eren and his fellow soldiers from the Survey Corps who are still fighting for their survival against the terrifying Titans. However, threats arise not only from the Titans beyond the walls, but from the humans within them as well. After being rescued from the Colossal and Armored Titans, all seems well for the soldiers, until the government suddenly demands custody of Eren and Historia. Sought after by the government, Levi and his new squad must evade their adversaries in hopes of keeping Eren and Historia safe. In the second half of the season, the Survey Corps led by Erwin embark on a mission to retake Wall Maria, returning to the tattered Shiganshina District that was once Eren's home. The Survey Corps strive to carve a path towards victory as Eren vows to take back everything that was once his.

The score is composed by Hiroyuki Sawano. The opening theme for the season's first 12 episodes is "Red Swan" by Yoshiki featuring Hyde, and the ending theme is "Requiem der Morgenröte" (暁の鎮魂歌, Akatsuki no Rekuiemu; lit. "Requiem of the Dawn") by Linked Horizon. For the second part of the season, the opening theme is "Shoukei to Shikabane no Michi" (憧憬と屍の道; lit. "The Path of Longing and Corpses") performed by Linked Horizon and the ending theme is "Name of Love" performed by Cinema Staff.

== Episodes ==
No. overall	No. in season	Title	Directed by	Written by	Storyboarded by	Original release date	English air date
Part 1
38	1	"Smoke Signal"; Transliteration: "Noroshi" (Japanese: 狼煙)	Hiroyuki Tanaka	Yasuko Kobayashi	Masashi Koizuka	July 23, 2018	July 11, 2018 (theatres) (Note: Funimation screened the episode in North American theatres on July 11, 2018.); August 18, 2018 (television)
The reformed Levi Squad, now composed of Eren and his six cadet friends, are camped out in a remote cottage, where Hange runs experiments to test Eren's Titan abilities. Pastor Nick is tortured and murdered by the Military Police's First Interior Squad, causing Levi to suspect that someone in the government is intent on destroying the Scout Regiment to conceal the secrets of the Titans and the Walls, and is after Eren and Historia. A message from Erwin, who has been arrested by the MP, has Levi abandon their hideout just before the MP arrives to raid it. The Scouts sneak back into the Trost District. Jean and Armin, disguised as Eren and Historia, are abducted by Dimo Reeves but the Scouts easily rescue them. As Levi shadows Eren and Historia's transport wagon, he feels uneasy, as the abduction feels similar to the actions of Kenny the Ripper, a notorious serial killer he lived with as a child. Sure enough, Kenny himself ambushes him with slug guns, killing Levi's team.
39	2	"Pain"; Transliteration: "Itami" (Japanese: 痛み)	Shita Taro	Yasuko Kobayashi	Takayuki Hirao	July 30, 2018	August 25, 2018
Kenny, now working for the First Interior Squad, violently pursues Levi, who fights and escapes. The Scouts are forced to defend Historia and Eren's wagon, which involves killing human attackers, something they have never done before. Armin is traumatised after killing an actual person rather than a Titan to save Jean. They are forced to retreat when the attackers subdue Historia and Eren with tranquilizer darts and escape. Levi interrogates Reeves, who was coerced into helping the Military Police, and offers him protection in exchange for his help. With Reeves' help, they capture Interior Squad soldiers Djel Sannes and Ralph, who murdered Pastor Nick, and torture them for information. They discover that Historia is the real heir to the throne and is being held by her father, Lord Rod Reiss. Reeves is killed by Kenny for betraying him, witnessed by Reeves' son, Flegel.
40	3	"Old Story"; Transliteration: "Mukashibanashi" (Japanese: 昔話)	Tomoko Hirakata	Hiroshi Seko	Hiroyuki Morita	August 6, 2018	September 8, 2018 (Note: Episode 40 was delayed due to Adult Swim airing a My Hero Academia marathon on September 1, 2018.)
In a flashback, Historia tells the Scouts of her upbringing, Kenny's execution of her mother, and her father sending her away after forcing her to adopt a fake identity. In the present, Rod explains he did so to protect her from execution. Hange tells the Scouts that Eren will be eaten by a Titan of the government's choosing so it can acquire his power to control other Titans. Erwin informs Commander Pyxis his plans of a nonviolent coup d'état to overthrow the corrupt Royal Government and restore Historia as the true Queen, as Sannes confessed that the current King is a fraud. Erwin reveals that his father was murdered for his theory that the Walls protect the property of the wealthy, not humanity, so they selfishly kill anyone who tries to uncover the Wall's secrets—which now includes Erwin, as he is framed for Reeves' murder. The entire Scout Regiment is placed under arrest as part of the plan to dissolve the team. Now fugitives, Squad Levi plans the Historia and Eren rescue operation.
41	4	"Trust"; Transliteration: "Shinrai" (Japanese: 信頼)	Aiko Sakuraba	Hiroshi Seko	Ryōtarō Makihara	August 13, 2018	September 15, 2018
Squad Levi captures the two soldiers tracking them, Marlowe and Hitch, Annie's friends in the Military Police. After learning that Annie was the Female Titan and the Scouts are being framed, Marlowe and Hitch help by leading them to an outpost. Levi tortures the Interior Police officer there for Eren and Historia's location. Hange rescues Flegel from the Military Police, who are trying to kill him to cover up that his father was killed by the Interior Police. Flegel tricks the MPs into confessing this and the fact that the government is trying to frame the Scouts before the residents of Stohess. With the people no longer fooled by the government, Hange takes her next step. As Erwin is brought before the King for execution, he warns his friend Nile that Nile must choose a side before Pyxis begins the coup.
42	5	"Reply"; Transliteration: "Kaitō" (Japanese: 回答)	Miki Komuro	Yasuko Kobayashi	Yoshiaki Kawajiri	August 20, 2018	September 22, 2018
At his trial, Erwin unsuccessfully proposes to reclaim Wall Maria to avoid a potential civil war caused by people competing for limited resources within Wall Rose and Wall Sina. Just then, news arrives that Wall Rose has been breached by Titans. Rather than allow Wall Rose refugees shelter within Wall Sina, the council orders the gates closed, willing to sacrifice the entire Wall Rose population. A disgusted Nile refuses to obey, and Chancellor Darius Zackly reveals that the breach report was a ruse that Erwin and Pyxis were in on. With the council's self-interest and disregard for its citizens revealed, they are all arrested, the Scout Regiment is exonerated, and the military temporarily takes over. Flegel has the news published in the press, informing the public of the truth. Hange brings the good news to the Levi Squad and informs them of the mysterious deaths of Rod Reiss' family that caused him to seek out Historia, the only member of his bloodline left. In a crystalline cavern, a chain-bound Eren is approached by Historia.
43	6	"Sin"; Transliteration: "Tsumi" (Japanese: 罪)	Ryūta Kawahara	Hiroshi Seko	Tomohiko Itō	August 27, 2018	September 30, 2018 (Note: Starting from episode 43, Attack on Titan season 3 part 1 moved to 12:00 a.m. ET/PT, effectively airing on Sunday morning.)
Rod has Historia touch Eren, which triggers forgotten memories for them both: Eren learns that he was turned into a Titan by his father Grisha and ate his father the night he received the basement key. Historia remembers her half-sister Frieda, who had erased her memories to protect her. Frieda possessed the Founding Titan power; Grisha, a Titan Shifter, devoured her for it and killed her siblings and mother. In the capital, Pyxis tells Erwin that the Reiss family possesses the rare power to alter people's memories; if they take Eren's Titan power as well, the entire population will lose their memories again. Kenny recalls his grandfather explaining that the Ackermans were once bodyguards to the Reiss royal family. They were persecuted as the Reiss memory-altering powers had no effect on them. Today, there are three known Ackermans: Levi, Mikasa, and Kenny, whom Levi has just learned he may be related to. Squad Levi finds the trapdoor to the cavern in the Reiss chapel and prepares to face Kenny's troops guarding inside.
44	7	"Wish"; Transliteration: "Negai" (Japanese: 願い)	Hiroyuki Tanaka, Ken Andō	Hiroshi Seko	Yuzo Sato	September 3, 2018	October 7, 2018
Squad Levi storms the cavern and forces Kenny's squad to retreat. Rod explains that the three Walls were built a century ago by their ancestor, the First King, who used the Founding Titan's power to erase the memories of all citizens (apart from the immune bloodlines) so that no one retained memory of the world's history beyond the Titans' arrival one hundred years ago. Generations later, Frieda inherited the Founding Titan, along with the memories of their world before Titans. Rod wants Historia to inject herself and become a Titan to eat Eren and reclaim the Founding Titan within him that he gained from eating his father, as only the Reisses can wield that Titan's power. Historia realizes that Rod's true intent is simply restoring his family's power; the Reisses cannot save humanity due to the First King brainwashing everyone. She breaks the syringe. Desperate, Rod laps up the serum and transforms into a massive Titan.
45	8	"Outside the Walls of Orvud District"; Transliteration: "Orubudo-ku Gaiheki" (Japanese: オルブド区外壁)	Matsuo Asami, Azuma Ryōsuke	Yasuko Kobayashi	Hiroyuki Morita	September 10, 2018	October 14, 2018
Squad Levi, Historia, and Eren are cornered by the Titan Rod Reiss, whose gigantic size causes the cavern to start collapsing. Eren spots a serum labeled Armor; drinking it allows his Titan to harden and stabilize their surroundings, saving his friends. The Scouts retrieve him from his crystallized Titan body and see that Rod's Titan is headed toward the Orvud District at Wall Sina. Unable to fight or restrain him, everyone agrees that Rod must be killed. Historia explains that Eren's father was, in fact, saving them by killing the Reiss family and taking the Founding Titan, as the Reisses were brainwashed by the First King to maintain "peace" by letting the Titans be rather than eradicating them with the Founding Titan. At Orvud District, Levi informs Historia that she must become Queen to ensure a peaceful transition from the coup d'état. Historia agrees. Erwin decides not to evacuate the citizens of Orvud, surprising everyone.
46	9	"Ruler of the Walls"; Transliteration: "Kabe no Ō" (Japanese: 壁の王)	Yasuhiro Akamatsu	Hiroshi Seko	Shinji Higuchi, Yasuhiro Akamatsu	September 17, 2018	October 21, 2018
Erwin justifies his decision; evacuation wouldn't matter because Rod's Titan is large enough to knock down all the Walls to get to them, which would destroy humanity. They decide to lure Rod into a trap. The Garrison Corp's cannon barrages have little effect, and Rod reaches the Wall, face and chest eroded from crawling for miles on the ground. The Scouts implement their plan. They ram the Titan's hands with gunpowder-loaded carts, destroying them with the explosion. After the Titan slumps over the Wall, Eren assumes his Titan form and plunges sacks of gunpowder barrels into its mouth. The Titan explodes from within and the Scouts slice through the airborne fragments. Historia is the one who succeeds in destroying the flesh of the nape, killing her father. In doing so, she sees his memories. Back at the Reiss estate, Kenny, mortally wounded from the cavern collapse, recalls his past, including with Levi when the boy was a child, before being found by Levi himself.
47	10	"Friends"; Transliteration: "Yūjin" (Japanese: 友人)	Shintarō Itoga, Aiko Sakuraba	Hiroshi Seko	Masayuki Miyaji	September 24, 2018	October 28, 2018
As he lies dying, Kenny Ackerman remembers his unlikely friendship with Uri Reiss years earlier; pledging loyalty to the family after Uri begged Kenny's forgiveness for the Ackermans' persecution; bringing up Levi, his dead sister Kuchel's son, teaching Levi how to survive in the Underground; and leading the clandestine Anti-Personnel Control Squad. Levi asks why Kenny eventually abandoned him as a child. Kenny states that he was not fit to be a parent, and with his dying words, reveals himself as Levi's uncle. Levi is left shaken by the discovery. Kenny hands over the Titan serum he stole from Rod Reiss' bag and dies. In the capital, Historia is officially crowned Queen. Elsewhere, the Beast Titan defeats Reiner and tells him and Bertholdt that rescuing Annie can come later and that retrieving the Coordinate (Eren) is their priority.
48	11	"Bystander"; Transliteration: "Bōkansha" (Japanese: 傍観者)	Matsuo Asami, Ken Andō, Shingo Uchida	Yasuko Kobayashi	Hiroshi Hara	October 8, 2018 (Note: Due to NHK's news coverage of Typhoon Trami, episode 11 of season 3 was delayed by a week to October 8, 2018.)	November 4, 2018
Two months after Historia's coronation, the military has purged the old puppet regime. Eren perfects his Titan hardening ability; with it, Hange develops a new guillotine weapon that allows them to easily kill Titans without fighting or risking human life. At Jean's prompting, Eren tries to remember the Scout who appeared in his father's memories from when Historia touched him. He realizes it was Training Corps Commander Keith Shadis, and the Scouts visit him. Keith explains that he met Grisha, who claimed to have amnesia, twenty years ago outside Wall Maria. Grisha worked as a doctor, married Carla, and had Eren. After the Fall of Wall Maria in Shiganshina, he took Eren into the woods, telling him to avenge his mother. Keith later found Eren unconscious and alone, with the key around his neck. Keith resigned as Commander, installing Erwin as the new one. Keith had hoped Eren would avoid becoming like Grisha but Eren says he is merely the son of a special man.
49	12	"Night of the Battle to Retake the Wall"; Transliteration: "Dakkan Sakusen no Yoru" (Japanese: 奪還作戦の夜)	Takashi Andō, Yasuhiro Akamatsu	Hiroshi Seko	Norihiro Naganuma	October 15, 2018	November 11, 2018
Unable to analyse the Titan Serum because of its volatile nature, Erwin entrusts it to Levi in the event it must be used to turn someone into a Titan. Arrangements are set for the expedition to retake Wall Maria and search the Yaeger family's basement, as Erwin suspects the truth of their world lies there. Worried about Erwin's chances of survival due to the fact that he is now handicapped with one arm, Levi tries to convince him to remain behind and let Hange command, but Erwin insists. On the night before the mission, Eren, Mikasa, and Armin reflect on their hopes for a future beyond the Walls. The day of the expedition, the people of Trost gather and give the Scouts a warm send-off, surprising them, as they are generally used to being disliked. Bertholdt and Reiner stand guard on Wall Maria. In a mid-credits scene, Levi berates a shell-shocked and teary-eyed Eren and Mikasa as they stand amidst destruction. He punches Eren, causing Mikasa to attack him with her blade at his neck.
Part 2
50	13	"The Town Where Everything Began"; Transliteration: "Hajimari no Machi" (Japanese: はじまりの街)	Hiroyuki Tanaka	Yasuko Kobayashi	Masayuki Miyaji	April 29, 2019	May 25, 2019
The Scout Regiment reaches the Shiganshina District in Wall Maria, planning to retake it and search Eren's basement. They are unsettled at how deserted Shiganshina District seems, with no Titans in sight, and how Eren is easily able to plug the hole in the outer wall with his Titan hardening. Before he can plug the inner wall, Armin discovers a recent campsite; remembering that they found Titans inside the walls, he has the soldiers search for wall cavities. Sure enough, Reiner bursts from a hole in the wall and transforms into the Armored Titan. The Scouts find themselves surrounded by the Beast Titan with an army of Titans. The Beast Titan seals the inner entrance with a boulder, trapping the horses within Shiganshina and preventing the soldiers from using them to escape.
51	14	"Thunder Spears"; Transliteration: "Raisō" (Japanese: 雷槍)	Akitoshi Yokoyama, Yasuhiro Akamatsu	Hiroshi Seko	Akitoshi Yokoyama	May 6, 2019	June 1, 2019
The Beast Titan sends the smaller Titans inside to kill the horses and cut off the Scouts' only escape route. Erwin has the majority of the squads protect the horses while the Levi and Hange squads tackle the Armored Titan, using Eren as bait to lure him away. The Armored Titan takes the bait, abandoning its target of killing the horses. Eren's training of hardening his hands pays off in the hand-to-hand combat, and he creates an opening for Hange and her squad to attack with their Thunder Spears, new weapons developed specifically for the Armored Titan. They succeed in blinding him and destroying the nape.
52	15	"Descent"; Transliteration: "Kōrin" (Japanese: 光臨)	Shingo Uchida, Norihito Takahashi, Mai Teshima, Hitomi Ezoe	Hiroshi Seko	Masasa Itō	May 13, 2019	June 8, 2019
Bertholdt thinks back to the Battle of Trost where he, Reiner, and Annie were forced to leave Marco to be eaten by Titans after he overheard the truth about them being Titans. In the present, the Armored Titan roars to signal the Beast Titan to throw the barrel containing Bertholdt into Shiganshina. Armin attempts to negotiate with him, but Bertholdt intends to kill everyone present. He transforms into the Colossal Titan, causing a massive fiery explosion that Hange's squad gets caught in. With only five members of the Levi Squad remaining, Armin hesitates over attempting an attack or retreat as the Colossal Titan begins to advance.
53	16	"Perfect Game"; Transliteration: "Pāfekuto Gēmu" (Japanese: 完全試合(パーフェクトゲーム))	Tetsuya Wakano	Hiroshi Seko	Kazuya Murata	May 20, 2019	June 15, 2019
Bertholdt's Colossal Titan turns Shiganshina into a sea of flames. Frozen by indecision, Armin hands over command to Jean, as he is good at analyzing situations quickly. Outside the Wall, the Beast Titan pitches a barrage of rocks toward the Scouts protecting the horses, stoning them and causing casualties. Eren tries to stop the Colossal Titan but is knocked unconscious. The situation looks hopeless until Erwin reveals his last ploy: a suicidal counterattack wherein he and the Scouts will serve as a diversion so Levi can kill the Beast Titan. Knowing that he is leading himself and the young Scouts to their deaths, Erwin shares an emotional farewell with Levi and gives a rousing speech to the recruits, telling them that it is better to die fighting rather than cower to the cruelty of this world, and that their lives and deaths are meaningful. He then leads the charge toward the Beast Titan through a hail of rocks.
54	17	"Hero"; Transliteration: "Yūsha" (Japanese: 勇者)	Akitoshi Yokoyama, Yoko Kanamori, Tetsurō Araki	Hiroshi Seko	Akitoshi Yokoyama	May 27, 2019	June 22, 2019
Erwin is mortally wounded but the Scouts push forward until the Beast Titan wipes them all out. Levi uses this distraction to incapacitate the Beast Titan, ripping out the bearded blond man inside. Levi intends to use the Titan serum to turn one of their own, hopefully Erwin, into a Titan and feed them the Beast Titan so they can gain its power. However, the Cart Titan rescues the blond man. Armin realizes the Colossal Titan goes immobile while emitting steam to defend itself, and comes up with a plan. Hange survived thanks to Moblit's sacrifice, and works with the team to blow Reiner out of his Titan. While Eren's Titan form is seemingly unconscious, Armin challenges the Colossal Titan. Bertholdt burns him alive in his steam, learning too late that Armin used himself as a distraction so Eren had time to harden his Titan form, successfully block the inner gate; then in human form, catch Bertholdt by surprise and rip him out of his Titan.
55	18	"Midnight Sun"; Transliteration: "Byakuya" (Japanese: 白夜)	Hiroyuki Tanaka, Shintarō Itoga	Hiroshi Seko	Yuzo Sato	June 3, 2019	June 29, 2019
Eren finds himself alone on a roof with Armin, burnt near death, and the unconscious Bertholdt. The Cart Titan arrives, and the blond man asserts that Eren's father lied to him. He promises a confused Eren that he will save him before fleeing. Hange takes Ymir's letter from Reiner's possession but the Cart Titan rescues Reiner before she can kill him. Mikasa finds Levi about to inject Armin with the serum to save him. However, when Floch Forster, the only surviving recruit from the suicide charge, arrives with Erwin, also close to death, Levi chooses Erwin instead, causing Eren and Mikasa to defy him and attack him in grief. Hange calms them down and takes them away. Alone now, Levi remembers a conversation with Erwin and ultimately chooses to let the Commander finally rest in peace, injecting Armin instead. Armin becomes a Titan and eats Bertholdt, gaining the power of the Colossal Titan. Levi and Hange mourn the deceased Erwin while the squad extracts a healed Armin from his Titan form.
56	19	"The Basement"; Transliteration: "Chikashitsu" (Japanese: 地下室)	Mai Teshima, Hitomi Ezoe	Yasuko Kobayashi	Masayuki Miyaji	June 10, 2019	July 6, 2019
Armin wakes up and learns that the nine of them are all that remains of the Scouts. He struggles with Levi's decision to save him instead of Erwin but Levi assures him that he does not regret his choice. Hange, Levi, Eren and Mikasa finally investigate Eren's basement. Grisha's key is not the key to the door but rather his desk drawer, containing three books. One has an image of Grisha with a woman and child who are neither Carla nor Eren. An inscription explains that the image is called a photograph, created by technology from a wealthy land beyond the Walls. Erwin had, in fact, always considered that there may be humans beyond the Walls. In a post-credits scene, Grisha's book recounts a time in his youth when he and his sister, Faye Yeager, lived in a city beyond Mitras, the world Eren knows today. Against their mother's rules, he ran with Faye beyond the walls of their district to watch an airship land.
57	20	"That Day"; Transliteration: "Ano Hi" (Japanese: あの日)	Yoko Kanamori	Hiroshi Seko	Yōko Kanamori	June 17, 2019	July 13, 2019
While Eren and Mikasa are held in the stockade as punishment for defying Levi in Shiganshina, Eren has a dream experiencing the life of his father Grisha. Grisha and Faye were caught outside the Liberio Internment Zone by Eren Kruger and his partner Gross, who secretly has Faye killed. Grisha's father teaches Grisha their people's history and the Marley nation's prejudice toward them. As an adult, Grisha joins the Eldian Restoration movement. The movement is supported by a secret informant in the Marley military named "Owl." Grisha marries Dina Fritz, the last Eldian with royal blood on the mainland, and they have a son, Zeke. Grisha's attempt to raise Zeke as an infiltrator in the Marley military backfires, as his son becomes loyal enough to turn in his own parents. Grisha, Dina, and the Restorationists are taken to the wall of Paradis Island, punished by being turned into mindless Pure Titans once injected with Titan spinal fluid; because Eldians can turn into Titans, Marleyans see them as monsters. Dina is revealed to become the Smiling Titan that devours Eren's mother. Kruger suddenly kills Gross, revealing himself to be both the Owl and a Titan shifter, transforming and annihilating the Public Safety soldiers.
58	21	"Attack Titan"; Transliteration: "Shingeki no Kyojin" (Japanese: 進撃の巨人)	Yasuhiro Akamatsu	Hiroshi Seko	Yasuhiro Akamatsu	June 24, 2019	July 21, 2019 (Note: Episode 58 was pushed back a half hour (12:00 a.m. EDT/PDT) due to the re-airing of the previous week's episode, effectively airing on Sunday morning.)
Armin transcribes as Eren details Eren Kruger's conversation with Grisha about his desire to restore Eldia. Kruger reveals that those who possess the Titan Power live for only thirteen years, along with the nature of the Coordinate. He tasks Grisha with infiltrating Paradis behind the Walls to take the Founding Titan from the royal family, and tells him to start a new family there before injecting him with the Titan serum. Puzzlingly, he mentions Armin and Mikasa; when Grisha asks who they are, Kruger doesn't know. In the present, everyone attends the government conference, where Hange reveals the new information learned from Grisha's journals: they are all Eldians, Subjects of Ymir, part of a special race that can turn into Titans, and are thus being persecuted by the outside world. Eren realizes that he can command Pure Titans despite not being of royalty because he touched the Pure Titan form of Dina, who was of royal blood. He keeps it to himself out of fear of what the military might do to Historia if he reveals this.
59	22	"The Other Side of the Wall"; Transliteration: "Kabe no Mukōgawa" (Japanese: 壁の向こう側)	Tetsuya Wakano, Shintarō Itoga, Tetsurō Araki	Yasuko Kobayashi	Daizen Komatsuda	July 1, 2019	July 27, 2019
Historia decides their people must be told the truth about the Titans, which had been kept secret for 100 years; that the breaching of Wall Maria five years ago was the beginning of a planned invasion by the state of Marley to steal their resources; and that the King a century ago had erased all of their memories to make them think humanity was wiped out and maintain peace rather than fight Marley. At a ceremony to honor their fallen comrades, Historia presents the nine surviving Scouts with medals. Eren touches her hand and is flooded by memories of his father confronting the Fritz royal family, indicating a connection through Titan blood. It takes one year to eradicate all Titans inside Wall Maria; finally, the refugees return to their hometowns and the Scouts resume expeditions outside the Walls. One day, they go far enough that they arrive at the Wall Eren recognizes as where Grisha became a Titan, and for the first time, everyone sees the ocean. Though the rest joyfully play, Eren is somber, realizing that they only found more enemies instead of freedom. He asks everyone if they would finally be free if they kill their enemies on the other side of the sea.

== Music ==
Sawano once again returned as composer. The soundtrack was released on June 26, 2019. As with the second season's soundtrack, music featured in compilation films and OVAs released between season two and three was included in the soundtrack. Vocals were provided by Laco, David Whitaker, Gemie, Eliana, mpi, Yosh from Survive Said the Prophet, and Aimee Blackschleger.

== Home media release ==
=== Japanese ===
Pony Canyon (Japan – Region 2/A)
Vol.	Episodes	Release date	Ref.
1	38–40	October 17, 2018	
2	41–43	December 19, 2018	
3	44–46	January 30, 2019	
4	47–49	February 27, 2019	
5	50–53	July 24, 2019	
6	54–56	August 21, 2019	
7	57–59	September 18, 2019	

=== English ===
Funimation (North America – Region 1/A)
Part	Episodes	Release date	Ref.
1	38–49	August 5, 2019	
2	50–59	March 17, 2020	

Manga Entertainment (British Isles – Region 2/B)
Part	Episodes	Release date	Ref.
1	38–49	August 12, 2019	
2	50–59	March 23, 2020	
Complete	38–59	March 2, 2021	

Madman Entertainment (Australasia – Region 4/B)
Part	Episodes	Release date	Ref.
1	38–49	October 9, 2019	
2	50–59	May 27, 2020	
