= Carole & Tuesday =

2019 anime television series by studio Bones

- Promotional image featuring Tuesday Simmons (left) and Carole Stanley (right)

キャロル&チューズデイ (Kyaroru & Chūzudei)
- Genre: Music
- Created by: Bones, Shinichirō Watanabe
- Anime television series
- Directed by: Shinichirō Watanabe (chief); Motonobu Hori
- Produced by: Makoto Nishibe; Noriko Ozaki
- Written by: Deko Akao; Yasuhiro Nakanishi; Kimiko Ueno; Yuichi Nomura; Shinichirō Watanabe; Keiko Nobumoto
- Music by: Mocky
- Studio: Bones
- Licensed by: Netflix (streaming): NA: Sentai Filmworks (home video)
- Original network: Fuji TV (+Ultra)
- Original run: April 11, 2019 – October 3, 2019
- Episodes: 24
- Manga
- Illustrated by: Morito Yamataka
- Published by: Kadokawa Shoten
- English publisher: NA: Yen Press
- Magazine: Young Ace
- Original run: May 2, 2019 – July 2020
- Volumes: 3
- icon

Carole & Tuesday (Japanese: キャロル&チューズデイ, Hepburn: Kyaroru & Chūzudei) is an original anime television series directed by Shinichirō Watanabe. It was produced by Bones in commemoration of the studio's 20th anniversary and the 10th anniversary of record label FlyingDog. It aired from April 11 to October 3, 2019, on Fuji TV's +Ultra programming block. A manga adaptation by Morito Yamataka began serialization in Young Ace in May 2019 and ended in July 2020. The manga is licensed in English by Yen Press. An English dub premiered worldwide on Netflix on August 30, 2019.

== Plot ==
In the future on a partially terraformed Mars, Tuesday Simmons runs away from her affluent lifestyle as the wealthy daughter of a politician and makes her way to Alba City to pursue her dream of being a musician with just a suitcase and her Gibson acoustic guitar. On her first day in the city, she crosses paths with Carole Stanley, an orphaned refugee from Earth and another aspiring musician who plays the piano. The two decide to team up as a singer-songwriter duo under the name Carole & Tuesday.

== Characters ==
=== Main ===
Carole Stanley (キャロル, Kyaroru)
Voiced by: Miyuri Shimabukuro (speaking voice) (Japanese); Nai Br.XX (vocals), Jeannie Tirado (English)
A 17-year-old girl who came to Mars at a young age. A keyboardist/pianist, she originally performed on the street in between part-time jobs before meeting Tuesday. She plays a Nord stage 88-key digital piano.
Tuesday Simmons (チューズデイ, Chūzudei)
Voiced by: Kana Ichinose (speaking voice) (Japanese); Celeina Ann (vocals), Brianna Knickerbocker (English)
A 17-year-old rich girl who runs away from her home in Herschel City and has a chance meeting with Carole. She plays a Gibson Hummingbird acoustic guitar.
Gus Goldman (ガス, Gasu)
Voiced by: Akio Ōtsuka (Japanese); Jason Marnocha (English)
A former rock drummer and self-proclaimed former big-time manager who discovers Carole and Tuesday and decides to help them become famous.
Roddy (ロディ, Rodi)
Voiced by: Miyu Irino (Japanese); Zach Aguilar (English)
A boy acquainted with Gus who first discovered Carole and Tuesday during their first guerilla live performance together. He works as a sound technician for Ertegun.
Angela Carpenter (アンジェラ, Anjera)
Voiced by: Sumire Uesaka (speaking voice) (Japanese); Alisa (vocals), Ryan Bartley (English)
A famous model who works alongside Tao in order to become recognized as a singer.
Tao (タオ, Tao)
Voiced by: Hiroshi Kamiya (Japanese); Kyle McCarley (English)
A music producer who uses advanced AI in order to create high-selling performers. He is coolly professional and admits to preferring the company of AIs to people.
Dahlia Carpenter (ダリア, Daria)
Voiced by: Kenyu Horiuchi (Japanese); Brook Chalmers (English)
Angela's mother and agent, biologically male before becoming intersex from exposure to the Martian environment.

=== Artists ===
Johnny Ertegun (アーティガン, Ātigan)
Voiced by: Mamoru Miyano (Japanese); Ray Chase (English)
A popular DJ with a pompous attitude, initially bearing a grudge on Carole and Tuesday over their rough first meeting. He later appears as a guest judge for the Mars' Brightest semi-finals.
Crystal (クリスタル, Kurisutaru)
Voiced by: Maaya Sakamoto (speaking voice) (Japanese); Lauren Dyson (vocals), Cristina Vee (English)
A popular singer.
Skip Collins (スキップ, Sukippu)
Voiced by: Hiroki Yasumoto (speaking voice) (Japanese); Thundercat (vocals), Imari Williams (English)
A popular singer.
Joshua (ヨシュア, Yoshua)
Voiced by: Yūki Kaji (Japanese); Erik Scott Kimerer (English)
Vocalist of the band Omega.
Desmond (デズモンド, Dezumondo)
Voiced by: Kōichi Yamadera (speaking voice) (Japanese); Marker Starling (vocals), Patrick Seitz (English)
A highly-respected artist who stopped making public appearances after being diagnosed with an incurable disease that made them unable to walk. Biologically male, Desmond identified themselves as non-binary after being exposed to the Martian environment. Though they end up in a coma after having Carole and Tuesday meet them for a final song, Desmond awakens in the series finale to make a final public appearance.
Flora (フローラ, Furōra)
Voiced by: Megumi Hayashibara (speaking voice) (Japanese); Jessica Karpov (vocals), Rebeka Thomas (English)
A retired singer whom Carole is a longtime admirer of and an old friend of Gus. Despite her past success, Flora has a history of depression and substance abuse.
Ezekiel (エゼキエル, Ezekieru)
Voiced by: Subaru Kimura (speaking voice) (Japanese); Denzel Curry (vocals), Zeno Robinson (English)
A rapper who emigrated from Earth. His real name is Amer Souleyman and is a childhood friend of Carole.

=== Mars' Brightest ===
==== Judges ====
Catherine (カトリーヌ, Katorīnu)
Voiced by: Seiko Tamura (Japanese); Roberta Lemons (English)
The head judge for Mars' Brightest.
Benito (ベニート, Benīto)
Voiced by: Kōji Ochiai (Japanese); Doug Erholtz (English)
One of the Mars' Brightest judges.
Shakti (シャクティ, Shakuti)
Voiced by: Hiroyuki Yoshino (Japanese); David Vincent (English)
An artificial intelligence in the form of a robot dog that serves as a guest judge in the first two weeks of Mars' Brightest.

==== Contestants ====
Cybelle (シベール, Shibēru)
Voiced by: Ayane Sakura (speaking voice), (Japanese); Laura Stahl (English), Maika Loubté (vocals) (French)
A French-singing Mars' Brightest contestant with a dangerous obsession with Tuesday.
Pyotr (ピョートル, Pyōtoru)
Voiced by: Shouta Aoi (speaking voice) (Japanese); J R Price (vocals), Erik Scott Kimerer (English)
A popular internet personality who participates in Mars' Brightest to boost his profile.
Mermaid Sisters (マーメイド・シスターズ, Māmeido Shisutāzu)
Voiced by: Shintarō Asanuma (speaking voice) (Japanese); Yuri Kuriyama (vocals), Armen Taylor, Keith Silverstein, Ray Chase (English)
An a capella group of drag queens, who are eliminated from the quarter-finals due to their verbally explicit lyrics.
Fire Brothers (ファイヤー兄弟, Faiyā Kyōdai)
Voiced by: Shōzō Iizuka (speaking voice), Singman (vocals)
A pair of elderly brothers who perform thrash metal music.
OG Bulldog (OGブルドッグ, OG Burudoggu)
Voiced by: Hiroshi Shirokuma (speaking voice), Kazuma Kudo (vocals) (Japanese); Armen Taylor (English)
A seemingly rough-looking contestant who mixes rap with opera.
GGK
Voiced by: Misaki Kuno (speaking voice) (Japanese); Madison McFerrin (vocals), Mela Lee (English)
A contestant who claims to be a vessel through which the universe sings.

=== Others ===
Valerie Simmons (ヴァレリー, Varerī)
Voiced by: Tomoko Miyadera (Japanese); Rachel Robinson (English)
Tuesday's mother, the governor of Hershall Province and a candidate for the presidency of Mars.
Spencer Simmons (スペンサー, Supensā)
Voiced by: Takahiro Sakurai (Japanese); Lucien Dodge (English)
Tuesday's older brother.
Katy Kimura (ケイティ・キムラ, Keiti Kimura)
Voiced by: Nao Tōyama (Japanese); Xanthe Huynh (English)
Angela's manager and biggest fan.
IDEA (イデア, Idea)
Voiced by: Uki Satake (Japanese); Kimberley Anne Campbell (English)
An AI robot ordered by Roddy who helped Carole & Tuesday for the production of their first music video, only to be revealed as a con artist.
Kyle (カイル, Kairu)
Voiced by: Junichi Suwabe (Japanese); Ben Lepley (English)
A journalist covering the Mars presidential election.
Tobe (トビー, Tobī)
Voiced by: Hiroshi Iwasaki (Japanese); John DeMita (English)
A legendary record producer who works with Carole and Tuesday. Known for his harsh methods.
Black Knight (ブラックナイト, Burakku Naito)
Voiced by: Akira Ishida (Japanese); Aleks Le (English)
A stalker who has a dangerous obsession with Angela.

== Media ==
=== Anime ===
The 24-episode anime television series is produced by Bones and directed by Motonobu Hori with Shinichirō Watanabe as supervising director. Eisaku Kubonouchi provided the original character designs, while Tsunenori Saito adapted them for animation. The series aired in Fuji TV's +Ultra timeslot from April 11 to October 3, 2019, and is streamed exclusively on Netflix. The series is in commemoration of the 20th anniversary of Bones and the 10th anniversary of record label FlyingDog. A special broadcast, Carole & Tuesday Golden Week Special, was aired on Line Live on May 1, 2019. It included a behind-the-scenes documentary, recording sessions with the singers, and the music video for the opening theme song "Kiss Me". Netflix holds international distribution rights, and the first half of Carole & Tuesday was released worldwide on August 30, 2019, with an English dub. The other half was released on December 24.

Starting on June 28, 2019, an eight-episode series of Flash-animated shorts titled Car & Tue began streaming on the series' official YouTube channel. The anime shorts center on "light-hearted, comical dialogue" between characters in the series.

==== Music ====
External videos
- "Kiss Me Music Video (short ver.)" The official music video of the first opening theme song by Nai Br.XX and Celeina Ann.

The opening and ending theme songs for the first half respectively are "Kiss Me" and "Hold Me Now", both performed by Nai Br.XX and Celeina Ann. The opening and ending theme songs for the second half respectively are "Polly Jean", performed by Nai Br.XX and Celeina Ann and "Not Afraid", performed by Alisa. Mocky composes the music at FlyingDog. Additional music is provided by other musicians, including:

- Alison Wonderland (Alexandra Sholler)
- D.A.N.
- Cero
- Flying Lotus (Steven Ellison)
- Mark Redito
- Madison McFerrin
- Taku Takahashi
- Taro Umebayashi
- Taylor McFerrin
- Thundercat (Stephen Lee Bruner)

The first soundtrack album, covering the first 12 episodes and comprising 20 tracks, was released on July 31, 2019. The album consists of songs written for the series' characters by the contributing musicians. The first insert song used in episodes 1, 2 and 12, titled "The Loneliest Girl", was released on digital streaming services on June 27, 2019.

==== Episodes ====
All episode titles are taken from pop and rock songs.

No.	Title	Directed by	Written by	Original release date
1	"True Colors"	Motonobu Hori	Deko Akao	April 11, 2019
Tuesday, the teenaged daughter of the prominent politician Valerie Simmons, runs away from home on terraformed Mars to be able to play music. In Alba City, chance brings her together with Carole, another aspiring young musician who's just been fired from her dead-end job. The two decide to make music together. Meanwhile, the prominent model Angela Carpenter is engaged as a "puppet" singer by the AI media mogul Tao.
2	"Born to Run"	Shohei Miyake	Deko Akao	April 18, 2019
Angela undergoes uncomfortable training with Tao. Carole is fired from another job. She and Tuesday sneak into a concert hall to play on a real piano. Their performance is surreptitiously filmed by the technician Roddy, and goes viral. Seeing it, the drunkard Gus Goldman tracks the two down and declares himself their manager.
3	"Fire and Rain"	Satoshi Takato	Yasuhiro Nakanishi	April 25, 2019
Gus, a manager whose best days are behind him, convinces the girls to sign on with him. A laundromat visit inspires them to create a new song ("Round & Laundry"). Carole, Tuesday and Angela separately undergo dubious voice training, and Angela's mother Dahlia pressures her daughter into continuing. Roddy connects Carole and Tuesday to the sleazy star DJ Ertegun. He dismisses the mere idea of non-AI-made music, and the visit ends in a disaster, but the girls are not disheartened.
4	"Video Killed the Radio Star"	Tsuyoshi Tobita	Kimiko Ueno	May 2, 2019
Carole, Tuesday, Gus and Roddy decide to make a viral music video. They buy the cheap director robot "IDEA", Gus convinces his ex-wife Marie to be the stylist, and they scrounge together the materials for a zombie-robot-dance video. But IDEA turns out to be a scammer who just wants to drink beer, the clip is awful and the girls are back at square one.
5	"Every Breath You Take"	Noriyuki Nomata	Deko Akao	May 9, 2019
Gus and Roddy try to find a venue for the girls' first gig. After Gus is thrown out by his ex-buddy-turned-CEO Höfner, Roddy convinces his friend, the bar owner Beth, to let Carole and Tuesday play one song, which is warmly received by the audience of ten. Tuesday's brother Spencer arrives in town to look for her, but leaves after he hears her sing. An a capella performance by Angela convinces the magnate Schwarz to invest 12 million woolong in her with Tao.
6	"Life Is a Carnival"	Shohei Miyake	Yuichi Nomura	May 16, 2019
Höfner arranges for Carole and Tuesday to be the backup for the flaky star Joshua in the prestigious Cydonia Festival. In shock, the two quickly compose a rock song. At the festival, the girls have to evade Ertegun and are encouraged by Skip, a veteran performer, before he takes the stage ("Unrequited Love" by Thundercat). When Joshua has a breakdown, Carole and Tuesday are called up. Facing a hostile crowd, they get through half of their song ("Round & Laundry") before the recovered Joshua storms the stage. But Crystal, another prominent musician, lifts their spirits with praise, and closes the evening ("Unbreakable" by Lauren Dyson).
7	"Show Me the Way"	Satoshi Takato	Kimiko Ueno	May 23, 2019
Gus signs Carole and Tuesday up for the talent show "Mars' Brightest". In the qualifying round, they meet the excitable social media star Pyotr, and perform after a number of bizarre and varied contestants. Afterwards, Tuesday is disheartened, realizing that she doesn't really know Carole, but a riverside chat with her friend cheers her up. When the two are selected for the finals, they face the media for the first time. Meanwhile, Angela, whose relationship with her mother becomes more distant, is also selected as a finals contestant.
8	"All the Young Dudes"	Tsuyoshi Tobita	Yasuhiro Nakanishi	May 30, 2019
In the quarterfinals of "Mars' Brightest", Pyotr ("Dance Tonight") defeats the 99-year-old Fire Brothers ("Never Die"), and Carole and Tuesday ("Whispering My Love") triumph over the operatic wannabe gangster OG Bulldog ("Bulldog Anthem"). Angela derides the girls as amateurs, and Tuesday meets her fervent admirer, the fellow contestant Cybelle.
9	"Dancing Queen"	Tomomi Kamiya	Deko Akao	June 6, 2019
Quarterfinals continue with the drag queen quartet Mermaid Sisters ("Galactic Mermaid") losing to the esoteric GGK ("Milky Way" by Madison McFerrin), and Angela ("Move Mountains" by Alisa) defeating Cybelle ("La ballade" by Maika Loubté). Tao takes an interest in Carole and Tuesday, and Cybelle clings possessively to the baffled Tuesday, who eventually rejects her.
10	"River Deep, Mountain High"	Tsuyoshi Tobita	Yuichi Nomura	June 13, 2019
In the semifinals, Angela ("All I Want") defeats GGK ("Gravity Bounce") after a last-minute song change by Tao. As Pyotr performs ("Love Yourself" by J R Price), Tuesday becomes concerned about Cybelle and searches for her. Minutes before the girls are due on stage, Carole discovers Tuesday with a burnt hand after she opened a now-smoking present.
11	"With or Without You"	Noriyuki Nomata	Kimiko Ueno	June 20, 2019
Tuesday's burns prevent her from playing the guitar, but she and Carole still beat Pyotr with "Lost My Way", despite interference from a judge, Ertegun. Cybelle is found out to have committed the attack on Tuesday out of jealousy, and is arrested. As Carole and Tuesday share each other's worries, goons sent by Tuesday's family abduct her by force.
12	"We've Only Just Begun"	Shohei Miyake	Shinichirō Watanabe	June 27, 2019
Tuesday's mother Valerie confines her to her room. With help from Carole, Gus, Roddy and Spencer, Tuesday manages to escape. Although Carole and Tuesday are disqualified for arriving late to the finals, their performance of "The Loneliest Girl" convinces the judges to allow them to make their debut alongside Angela.
13	"Walk This Way"	Satoshi Takato, Ryota Miyazawa, Noriyuki Nomata	Yasuhiro Nakanishi	July 11, 2019
Carole and Tuesday, now famous, sit for interviews. They are harassed by louts at the laundromat, but a stranger, Dann, drives them off. Gus rejects a restrictive records contract with the owners of Mars' Brightest. To launch Carole and Tuesday as indie musicians, he takes them to the slums to find the retired producer Tobe, who turns out to be a deranged old man with an axe. Valerie, assisted by Spencer, launches her election campaign with an anti-immigrant message.
14	"The Kids Are Alright"	Naoki Murata	Deko Akao	July 18, 2019
Tobe takes on Carole and Tuesday. With Skip and his friends as backing, they record a song with which Tobe is satisfied after "only" 52 takes. A reporter questions Tuesday about her mother, who hardens her isolationist position against Earth. Dann reveals to Carole that he is her father. Abandoned as an orphan on Earth, she never knew her parents. Dann says that, after 17 years of prison on Earth, he used his probation leave to get a glimpse of her.
15	"God Only Knows"	Tsuyoshi Tobita	Keiko Nobumoto	August 1, 2019
Desmond, a reclusive, eccentric musician, invites Carole and Tuesday to their garden home. Desmond, suffering from an incurable disease, mused about their life and friendship before treating the girls to their last song and then entering a coma. Meanwhile, Valerie meets the incumbent president of Mars, Hamilton, in a debate. She calls for an end to the admission of refugees from Earth and the termination of the trade agreement with Earth.
16	"A Natural Woman"	Midori Yui	Yuichi Nomura	August 8, 2019
Carole and Tuesday learn their first single made number 53 on the charts. Gus, seeking to bolster the girls popularity, gets them a gig at South by Southwest (SXSW). To prepare, they pick up a drummer, a bassist, and an electric guitarist. Meanwhile, Gus runs into Flora, an old artist he used to manage who has fallen from grace and out of music. However, at SXSW, Carole and Tuesday's singing manages to sway her heart.
17	"Head Over Heels"	Noriyuki Nomata	Kimiko Ueno	August 15, 2019
One morning, Ertegun awakens to find himself bankrupt – his AI manager has made off with all of his money. Ertegun's house is foreclosed, and without a penny to his name, he is forced to sleep at Roddy's place. Ertegun completely loses his confidence and begins questioning his own identity. Trying to cheer him up, Roddy takes Ertegun to visit Carole and Tuesday, who are busy working on their first album. And so, Ertegun's comeback drama begins, with everyone including Tao and Angela dragged into it.
18	"Only Love Can Break Your Heart"	Satoshi Takato	Yasuhiro Nakanishi	August 22, 2019
Carole and Tuesday are officially confirmed to play at the autumn Cydonia Festival. Tuesday resolves to confront her mother and decides to meet with Kyle, the reporter doing a story on Valerie. Tuesday gradually becomes attracted to Kyle, who provides a sympathetic ear for all her concerns. Meanwhile, a weather plant is bombed by unknown persons. This incident, along with Valerie's hardline stance against immigrants from Earth, stirs up public opinion.
19	"People Get Ready"	Ryohei Takeshita, Motonobu Hori	Deko Akao	August 29, 2019
Dahlia reveals to Tao that Angela is being threatened by a stalker who calls himself "The Black Knight". Upon hearing this, Tao takes it upon himself to find the culprit. For the upcoming Cydonia Festival, Angela has agreed to appear as a secret guest for Ertegun. Meanwhile, Carole and Tuesday, eager to redeem themselves after their last disastrous performance at Cydonia Festival, are also making preparations. Finally, the curtain rises on each of their stages.
20	"Immigrant Song"	Danzo Kato	Yuichi Nomura	September 5, 2019
Following the weather plant terrorist incident, presidential candidate Valerie sees a sharp rise in popularity for her anti-Earth immigrant rhetoric. Carole & Tuesday and Angela are nominated for the Grammy Award for Best New Artist, and Tao is suddenly taken into custody by the Mars Federal Attorney's Office after refusing a request from Schwartz. Meanwhile, Carole tries to make contact with the rapper Ezekiel, who she believes is her childhood friend Amer from the orphanage.
21	"It's Too Late"	Tsuyoshi Tobita	Kimiko Ueno	September 12, 2019
With Tao under arrest and her mother Dahlia in a coma, Angela is left feeling alone like never before. The Mars Grammys are to take place on Christmas, Carole's birthday. Carole & Tuesday rack their brains for the perfect song to complete their album, while Gus runs around trying to organize a special guest to co-perform with them. Carole also goes to see Amer to convey her feelings before he's deported back to Earth.
22	"Just Like Heaven"	Shohei Miyake	Yasuhiro Nakanishi	September 19, 2019
Crystal agrees to perform with Carole & Tuesday at the Mars Grammys ceremony, but on the condition that the song they sing be a light of hope in the current darkening political times. They complete a song that Crystal approves of, just in time for the ceremony and Christmas, which is Carole's birthday. The morning of the show, Dahlia apologizes to Angela before passing away in the hospital. The show begins with Carole & Tuesday's performance, followed by the announcement that Angela won Best New Artist. She performs a song, before collapsing on stage.
23	"Don't Stop Believin'"	Noriyuki Nomata	Deko Akao	September 26, 2019
Angela is in a coma following her collapse at the Mars Grammys. Meanwhile, musicians such as Skip who oppose Valerie's proposed restrictions on freedom of speech are being arrested one after the other. In a meeting with Gus, Roddy and Ertegun, Carole and Tuesday suggest musicians from all over Mars sing together in a show of solidarity, and the girls are charged with writing the song. They also hope that Angela will join them, crediting her as the reason the girls were able to grow as artists.
24	"A Change Is Gonna Come"	Motonobu Hori, Satoshi Takato	Shinichiro Watanabe	October 3, 2019
Tao reveals a long-kept secret to Angela while Carole and Tuesday finally complete their task. Valerie withdraws her candidacy for president upon finding out from Spencer (via Kyle) that Jerry was involved in the bombing incident. On New Year's Eve, musicians from across Mars including Crystal, Flora, Pyotr, GGK, a revived Desmond, and Angela, secretly gather at the Mars Immigration Memorial Hall to perform Carole and Tuesday's new song "Mother" together, in an event that would go down in Martian history as the "Seven-Minute Miracle".

==== Media release ====
FlyingDog released Carole & Tuesday across two volumes, in DVD and Blu-ray media formats.

Volume	Episodes	Release date	Ref.
Volume 1	1–12	October 30, 2019	
Volume 2	13–24	January 15, 2020	

=== Manga ===
A manga adaptation, illustrated by Morito Yamataka, began serialization in Kadokawa Shoten's Young Ace magazine on May 2, 2019. The manga ended in July 2020. Yen Press announced the license of the manga at Anime NYC in November 2019 and released it from December 2020 to January 2022.

== Reception ==
Carole & Tuesday has a 100% rating based on 6 reviews on Rotten Tomatoes, and the average rating is 8.5/10.

James Beckett of Anime News Network commended the show, giving it an A overall, citing "genuinely delightful" music, a "colorful, well-realized world", and stated that the English dub "serves the anime even better than its original Japanese track".

In her review of the show for Syfy, Laura Dale criticized the LGBTQ representation in the show, arguing that the show often uses "minority characters as punchlines and stereotypes for plot progression" and stating that while the show has "really sweet, soft queer energy," she remained disappointed that the show had "repeated harmful representations of queer characters."

Mocky was awarded Best Score for his soundtrack work, while the anime was nominated for eight other categories including "Anime of the Year" at the 4th Crunchyroll Anime Awards. It was also nominated for Outstanding Achievement for Storyboarding in an Animated Television/Broadcast Production at the 47th Annie Awards.
