= Cinema Staff =

Japanese band

- Origin: Gifu Prefecture, Japan
- Genres: Indie rock; alternative rock; post-rock; noise pop; math rock
- Years active: 2003–present
- Labels: Under Bar (2008–2011); Pony Canyon Inc. (2012–2019)
- Members: Tomotoka Tsuji; Mizuki Iida; Sōhei Mishima; Yōhei Kuno
- Website: www.cinemastaff.net

Cinema Staff (stylized as cinema staff) are a Japanese alternative rock band from Gifu Prefecture, formed in 2003. Originally formed as Real when the band members were still in high school, they made their major debut on the label Pony Canyon in June 2012 with the release of their EP Into the Green. Their single "Great Escape" was used as the second ending theme to the anime television series Attack on Titan. Another single, "Kirifuda", was used as the fourth opening theme to the anime television series Yu-Gi-Oh! Arc-V.

== Band members ==
All members of cinema staff were born in 1987.

=== Current members ===
- Tomoaki Tsuji (born April 28, 1987) plays guitar and serves as the band's leader.
  - A native of Gifu Prefecture and a graduate of the Nagoya Institute of Technology, he is typically positioned in the center of the stage. In addition to his work in cinema staff, Tsuji has been active in the side project band "peelingwards" alongside bandmate Sohei Mishima since January 2013, where he handles guitar and backing vocals.
- Mizuki Iida (born April 8, 1987) is the lead vocalist and guitarist, positioned on the right side of the stage.
  - Also a Gifu Prefecture native, Iida is credited as the lyricist for several of the band's tracks, including "Cycle," "Mousou Kairo," "unsung," "somehow," and "Kuuhaku." On October 24, 2018, he released his debut solo digital single, "Genun" (Vertigo). Later that year, he contributed as a guest vocalist on the song "Rakuen no Kimi" by österreich, which served as the second ending theme for the anime series Tokyo Ghoul:re. His older brother is the singer and illustrator Toshiki Iida.
- Sohei Mishima (born August 30, 1987) plays bass and provides backing vocals, typically positioned on the left side of the stage.
  - Hailing from Mizuho, Gifu Prefecture, Mishima has been the primary lyricist and composer for the band since its formation. On September 16, 2020, he released his debut solo album, plan B, as a digital release. He is married to Hiromi Hirohiro, the bassist and vocalist of the rock band tricot.
- Youhei Kuno (born December 8, 1987) is the drummer, positioned in the center of the back row.
  - A native of Inuyama, Aichi Prefecture, Kuno is also an accomplished illustrator and has designed original merchandise for the band, including LINE sticker sets such as "Doko Usa" and "Zankyo-kun." Outside of his musical activities, he is active as a video game streamer and commentator under the alias "Dokomusu" (ドコムス).

== History ==
=== Early years and independent debut (2003–2011) ===
Cinema staff was formed in 2003 under the name "REAL" by high school classmates Tsuji, Iida, and Mishima. In 2006, as the members entered university, the group underwent lineup changes, including the addition of a drummer who preceded Kuno, and the band was renamed "cinema staff". In July of that year, Mishima recruited Kuno from the American Folk Music Club at Nanzan University, finalizing the band's current lineup. Operating primarily out of Nagoya, the group began performing at local venues and national competitions. In September 2006, they reportedly won the grand prize at the College Rock Festival 2006 national tournament held at Imaike Bottom Line, and in November, they participated in the national tournament of the Teens' Music Festival 2006. In November 2008, cinema staff made their independent debut through Zankyo Record. By March 2010, they held their first headlining concerts at Shibuya O-nest and CLUB ROCK'N'ROLL, both of which sold out on the day tickets were released. Their rising prominence in the independent music scene was recognized in January 2011 when the iTunes Store selected them as one of the top ten anticipated breakthrough artists for its "Japan Sound of 2011" list.

=== Major debut and commercial success (2012–2018) ===
The band received the Tokai Block Award at the 4th CD Shop Awards in early 2012. In June of that year, cinema staff made their major label debut under Pony Canyon. In August 2013, they released the single "great escape," which served as the second ending theme for the first season of the anime television series Attack on Titan and achieved notable commercial success. In October 2013, member Mishima initiated "OOPARTS," an annual self-produced music festival held in their home prefecture of Gifu, with the stated aim of contributing to the local community through their activities.

The band continued to release music and receive industry recognition, with their album Bokyo and EP Solution E.P. earning nominations for the Music Jacket Awards in 2014 and 2016, respectively. Solution E.P., released in December 2015, included the track "Kirifuda," which served as an opening theme for the anime series Yu-Gi-Oh! ARC-V. In November 2016, they released their first triple A-side EP, Vektor E.P., and celebrated its launch with a special event titled "Cinema no Kinema" on the release date of November 30. This was followed by the release of their sixth studio album, Netsugen, in May 2017. In January 2018, the band released the digital single "HYPER CHANT," commissioned as the official support song for the J.League football club FC Gifu.

=== Later years and disbandment (2019–present) ===
In September 2019, cinema staff released their first greatest hits compilation, Best of the Super Cinema 2008–2011 / 2012–2019. Their seventh studio album, Kaitei yori Ai o Komete (From the Sea Bottom with Love), was released in November 2021 under the label This Time Inc., with distribution by PCI Music. On September 23, 2026, the band announced that they would disband in 2027, concluding a 20-year career. Their final performance is scheduled to take place at a headlining concert at Toyosu PIT in Tokyo on September 12, 2027.

== Discography ==
=== Studio albums ===
| Title | Album details | Peak chart positions | |
| Title | Album details | JPN Oricon | JPN Billboard |
|---|---|---|---|
| Cinema Staff | Released: June 1, 2011; Label: Under Bar; Format: CD | 41 | 38 |
| Boukyou (望郷; Hometown) | Released: May 22, 2013; Label: Pony Canyon; Formats: CD, digital download | 25 | 22 |
| Drums, Bass, 2(to) Guitars | Released: April 2, 2014; Label: Pony Canyon; Formats: CD, digital download | 32 | 26 |
| Blueprint | Released: April 22, 2015; Label: Pony Canyon; Formats: CD, digital download | 27 | 23 |
| Eve | Released: May 18, 2016; Label: Pony Canyon; Formats: CD, digital download | 22 | 19 |
| Netsugen (熱源; Heat Source) | Released: May 17, 2017; Label: Pony Canyon; Formats: CD, digital download | 22 | 19 |
| Kaitei Yori Ai wo Komite (海底より愛をこめて; With Love from the Bottom of the Sea) | Released: November 3, 2021; Label: Self-released; Formats: CD, digital download | 40 | 34 |

=== Mini albums ===
| Title | Album details | Peak chart positions | |
| Title | Album details | JPN Oricon | JPN Billboard |
|---|---|---|---|
| Document | Released: November 19, 2008; Label: Under Bar; Format: CD | — | — |
| Symmeteronica | Released: June 10, 2009; Label: Under Bar; Format: CD | 115 | — |
| Blue, Under the Imagination | Released: July 7, 2010; Label: Under Bar; Format: CD | 72 | 74 |
| Salvage You | Released: September 5, 2012; Label: Pony Canyon; Formats: CD, digital download | 44 | 33 |

=== Compilation albums ===
| Title | Album details | Peak chart positions | |
| Title | Album details | JPN Oricon | JPN Billboard |
|---|---|---|---|
| Best Of The Super Cinema 2008-2011/2012-2019 | Released: September 18, 2019; Label: Pony Canyon; Format: CD, digital download | 33 | 29 |

=== Extended plays ===
| Title | EP details | Peak chart positions | |
| Title | EP details | JPN Oricon | JPN Billboard |
|---|---|---|---|
| Into the Green | Released: June 20, 2012; Label: Pony Canyon; Formats: CD, digital download | 42 | 35 |

=== Singles ===
| Title | Year | Peak chart positions | | Sales | Certifications | Notes | Album |
| Title | Year | JPN Oricon | JPN Billboard | Sales | Certifications | Notes | Album |
|---|---|---|---|---|---|---|---|
| "Suiheisen wa Yoru Ugoku" (水平線は夜動く) | 2011 | 32 | — | | | | Non-album single |
| "Chiisana Shokutaku" (小さな食卓; "Small Table") | 2013 | 46 | — | | | | Boukyou |
| "Seinansei no Niji" (西南西の虹; "Rainbow in West and Southwest") | 2013 | 38 | — | | | | Boukyou |
| "Great Escape" (Drums, Bass, 2(to) Guitars only includes an alternative version) | 2013 | 12 | 11 | | RIAJ: Gold | Second ED theme for the anime Attack on Titan Season 1. | Drums, Bass, 2(to) Guitars |
| "Waypoint E.P." (Note: Categorized as a single since it contains 3 songs.) | 2015 | 46 | — | | | | Eve |
| "Solution E.P." | 2015 | 40 | — | | | | Eve |
| "Vektor E.P." | 2016 | 54 | — | | | | Netsugen |
| "Name of Love" | 2019 | 39 | — | JPN: 1,677 | | Second ED theme for the anime Attack on Titan Season 3. | Best Of The Super Cinema 2008-2011/2012-2019 |

== Awards and nominations ==
| Year | Award | Category | Work/Nominee | Result |
|---|---|---|---|---|
| 2012 | CD Shop Awards | Regional Production (Tōkai region) | Cinema Staff | Won |
| 2013 | Billboard Japan Music Awards | Animation Artist of the Year | Cinema Staff | Nominated |
| 2014 | Music Jacket Awards | Grand Prize | Boukyou | Nominated |
| 2016 | Music Jacket Awards | Grand Prize | "Solution E.P." | Nominated |
