= Celeina Ann =

American-Japanese singer-songwriter

Celeina Ann セレイナ・アン
- Born: March 7, 1996 (age 30); Tokyo, Japan
- Genres: J-pop; R & B; acoustic
- Occupations: Singer; songwriter
- Instruments: Vocals, guitar, piano, keyboards
- Years active: 2015–present
- Label: Universal Music
- Website: www.celeinaann.com

Celeina Ann (born March 7, 1996) is a Japanese singer-songwriter.

== Early life ==
Celeina Ann was born in Tokyo, Japan to a Japanese father and an American mother.

== Career ==
Celeina Ann debuted with her first mini album, We Are One, on November 27, 2015, on iTunes, which later received a physical release on April 20, 2016. The mini album charted at No. 4 on iTunes. In 2018, Celeina Ann contributed the songs "La La Bye", "Silver Winter Love", and "Love Yourself" to the album Quality, with other Starbase Records artists. In 2019, Celeina Ann collaborated with DJ Okawari to produce the album Nightfall.

== Discography ==
=== Studio albums ===
List of studio albums, with selected chart positions, sales figures and certifications
Title	Year	Album details	Peak chart positions		Sales
Title	Year	Album details	JPN		Sales
Title	Year	Album details	Oricon	Billboard Japan	Sales
Departures	2018	Released: March 28, 2018; Label: Universal Music; Formats: CD, digital download	—	—	—
"—" denotes releases that did not chart or were not released in that region.

=== Extended plays ===
List of extended plays, with selected chart positions, sales figures and certifications
Title	Year	Album details	Peak chart positions		Sales
Title	Year	Album details	JPN		Sales
Title	Year	Album details	Oricon	Billboard Japan	Sales
We Are One	2015	Released: November 27, 2015 (digital), April 20, 2016 (physical); Label: Star Base Records; Formats: CD, digital download	—	—	—
Sundays	2016	Released: July 13, 2016; Label: Universal Music; Formats: CD, digital download	174	—	—
"—" denotes releases that did not chart or were not released in that region.

=== Singles ===
Title	Year	Peak chart positions		Sales	Album
Title	Year	JPN	JPN Hot	Sales	Album
"Aoi Sora to Watashi" (青い空と私)	2016	92	—	—	Non-album single
"Love & Sweet"	2017	170	—	—	Non-album single
"—" denotes releases that did not chart or were not released in that region.

=== Other charted songs ===
Title	Year	Peak chart positions		Sales	Album
Title	Year	JPN	JPN Hot	Sales	Album
"Kiss Me/Hold Me Now" (with Nai Br.XX as Carole & Tuesday)	2019	21	—	—	Carole & Tuesday Original Soundtrack
"Polly Jean/Not Afraid" (with Nai Br.XX as Carole & Tuesday)	2019	46	—	—	Carole & Tuesday Original Soundtrack
"—" denotes releases that did not chart or were not released in that region.

== Filmography ==
=== Radio ===
Year	Title	Station	Notes
2018	Sunday! Fun! Day!	Bay FM	Radio host

=== Anime ===
Year	Title	Role	Notes
2019	Carole & Tuesday	Tuesday Simmons	Singing voice
