= DJ Okawari =

- Also known as: DJ Okawari
- Born: November 28, 1989 (age 36); Shizuoka, Japan
- Origin: Shizuoka, Japan
- Genres: Instrumental hip hop, hip hop, nu jazz, japanese jazz
- Occupations: DJ; record producer; composer
- Instruments: Piano, Saxophone, Trumpet, String
- Years active: 2008–present
- Labels: Libyus Music, Space Shower Music, Mono Creation
- Website: djokawari.com

DJ Okawari is an independent Japanese DJ, record producer and composer born and based in Shizuoka, Japan. His style mixes instrumental hip hop, nu jazz, and japanese jazz. Piano is an instrumental theme in his music. In his career, he has released seven studio albums: Diorama in 2008, Mirror in 2009, Kaleidoscope in 2011, Compass in 2017, Restore (with Emily Styler) and Perfect Blue in 2018, and Nightfall (with Celeina Ann) in 2019. He also released the EP High Noon in 2023.

== Biography ==
DJ Okawari is known for his unique approach to music, blending piano jazz and hip-hop influences to create a mellow yet soothing vibe. Luv Letter (music by Tsukinosora) of the album Mirror was used in one of figure skater Daisuke Takahashi's routines at the 2010 World Figure Skating Championships. His music is also frequently played on YouTube; the videos have garnered views well above 10 million. The art for DJ Okawari's album covers were created by Japanese graphic artist Marumiyan.

== Discography ==
=== Studio albums ===
Diorama (2008)

No.	Title	Length
1.	"Evening Comes"	4:17
2.	"Chocolate" (featuring Agehah)	4:22
3.	"Bluebird Story" (featuring Jumelles)	3:19
4.	"Ring"	3:20
5.	"Colors of Life"	3:27
6.	"Synchronize"	3:42
7.	"One for U"	4:01
8.	"Aurora" (featuring Eri Kamiya)	5:05
9.	"Coffee Break"	1:46
10.	"Crescent Moon"	4:13
11.	"Tayutau"	3:54
12.	"Silent Night"	3:53
13.	"Animal Forest"	3:40
14.	"Times Fusion"	5:27
Total length:		54:26

Mirror (2009)

No.	Title	Length
1.	"Sound of Silence" (featuring Kaori)	4:28
2.	"Luv Letter" (Tsukinosora)	4:31
3.	"You Gotta Be" (featuring Amadori) (Des'ree cover)	3:59
4.	"Pack Light" (featuring Eriko)	4:04
5.	"Afterschool"	3:52
6.	"Following the Dream"	1:58
7.	"Free Bird" (featuring Sierra)	4:59
8.	"Sweet Light"	3:54
9.	"All I Have" (featuring Amanda Diva)	3:52
10.	"Minamo"	3:51
11.	"Evening Comes 2"	4:11
Total length:		43:29

Kaleidoscope (2011)

No.	Title	Length
1.	"Encounter"	3:25
2.	"Brown Eyes" (featuring Brittany Campbell)	5:15
3.	"Represent" (featuring Chieko Kinbara)	4:35
4.	"Kaleidoscope" (featuring Tekitha)	3:59
5.	"Flower Dance"	4:28
6.	"U" (featuring Stacy Epps)	4:31
7.	"Another Sky"	2:54
8.	"A Cup of Coffee"	4:34
9.	"Brighter Side" (featuring Amanda Diva)	4:39
10.	"Temperature of Tears"	4:31
11.	"The Bonds" (featuring NANASE)	4:53
12.	"Change the World" (featuring WoongSan)	3:54
13.	"Peacock"	4:40
Total length:		56:18

Compass (2017)

No.	Title	Length
1.	"Bounce" (featuring Talib Kweli)	2:20
2.	"Starry Sky"	4:24
3.	"Midnight Train" (featuring Emi Meyer)	5:04
4.	"Yours"	4:01
5.	"Keep Falling" (featuring GIOVANCA)	4:30
6.	"Last Note"	3:04
7.	"Eventually" (featuring Emily Styler)	3:40
8.	"Mirage"	4:38
9.	"Be There" (featuring Brittany Campbell)	4:16
10.	"Sadame"	4:15
11.	"Four Water"	4:03
Total length:		44:15

Restore (2018) [collaboration with Emily Styler]

No.	Title	Length
1.	"Your Love"	4:55
2.	"All I Need"	3:23
3.	"I'm With You"	4:31
4.	"Engage Ring"	5:00
5.	"Move It"	4:08
6.	"Redripstick"	4:39
7.	"Flower Dance, Pt. 2"	4:10
8.	"Emotions Swim Inside"	4:54
9.	"Over the Rain"	3:52
10.	"Feel Alive"	4:17
11.	"Another Starlight"	4:04
12.	"Last Romance"	4:44
Total length:		52:00

Perfect Blue (2018)

No.	Title	Length
1.	"Voice of Nature"	3:35
2.	"Altair" (featuring Lee Ayur & Jabberloop)	4:42
3.	"SAKURA Tears" (featuring Kie Katagi from jizue)	3:57
4.	"Perfect Blue"	5:10
5.	"Halcyon"	4:34
6.	"Lightning Moment" (featuring fox capture plan)	4:39
7.	"Nostalgic Echoes"	3:59
Total length:		30:36

Nightfall (2019) [collaboration with Celeina Ann]

No.	Title	Length
1.	"Nightfall"	3:34
2.	"Fragile"	4:31
3.	"Twilight"	3:38
4.	"Addiction"	4:34
5.	"Mesmerize"	3:28
6.	"Glitter"	4:44
7.	"Spectrum"	4:26
Total length:		28:55

=== EPs ===
High Noon (2023)

No.	Title	Length
1.	"Sphere"	3:25
2.	"After the Wind"	4:22
3.	"Daydream"	3:33
4.	"Heart"	4:34
5.	"The Other Side"	3:39
6.	"Crossroad"	3:35
Total length:		23:08
