= Great Escape (Cinema Staff song) =

Single by Cinema Staff

- Official song cover

Single by Cinema Staff

from the album Drums,Bass,2(to) Guitars
- Language: Japanese
- B-side: "cinema staff [bokutachi no hihō] tour Final @2013.07.11 Shibuya CLUB QUATTRO"
- Released: August 21, 2013
- Recorded: 2013
- Genre: J-POP; Rock
- Length: 3:27
- Label: Pony Canyon
- Composer: Cinema Staff
- Lyricist: Sohei Mishima

Cinema Staff singles chronology
"Chiisana Shokutaku" / "Seinan Sei no Niji" (2013)	"Great Escape" (2013)	"WAYPOINT E.P." (2015)

"Great Escape" (stylized in lowercase) was the fourth single created by the Japanese band Cinema Staff, and their third major song. It was released by Pony Canyon on August 21, 2013, and reached the number one spot on the Billboard Japan Hot Animation chart upon its debut. The song is best remembered for its use as the ending theme for the second half of season one of Attack on Titan.

== B-side ==
The single was released alongside the coupling B-side music compilation titled "cinema staff [bokutachi no hihō] tour Final @2013.07.11 Shibuya CLUB QUATTRO" (cinema staff【僕たちの秘法】tour Final @2013.07.11 渋谷CLUB QUATTRO; lit. 'cinema staff [our secret method] tour Final @2013.07.11 Shibuya CLUB QUATTRO'), which itself is composed of songs recorded live during the band's nationwide tour of Japan titled "Our Secret". The songs were more specifically recorded at Shibuya Club Quattro on July 11, 2013.

As for the intention behind the inclusion of these songs live versions instead of their official ones, lyricist Sohei Mishima commented, "If you listen to this, even people who have never been to a band live like us can feel the atmosphere."

== Track listing ==
CD Single
No.	Title	Lyrics	Music	Arrangement	Length
1.	"Great Escape"	Sohei Mishima	Cinema Staff	Cinema Staff / Seiji Kameda	3:27
2.	"cinema staff [bokutachi no hihō] tour Final @2013.07.11 Shibuya CLUB QUATTRO"		Cinema Staff	Cinema Staff	33:34
Total length:					37:01

== Chart performance ==
Chart (2013)	Peak position
Billboard Japan Adult Contemporary Airplay	38
Billboard Japan Hot 100	11
Billboard Japan Hot Animation	1
Billboard Japan Top Singles Sales	10
Billboard Japan Top Airplay	25
Oricon Weekly	12
Oricon Monthly	37

== Certifications ==
Region	Certification	Certified units/sales
Japan (RIAJ)	Gold	100,000^{*}
^{*} Sales figures based on certification alone.
