= Sae Shimizu =

Japanese figure skater

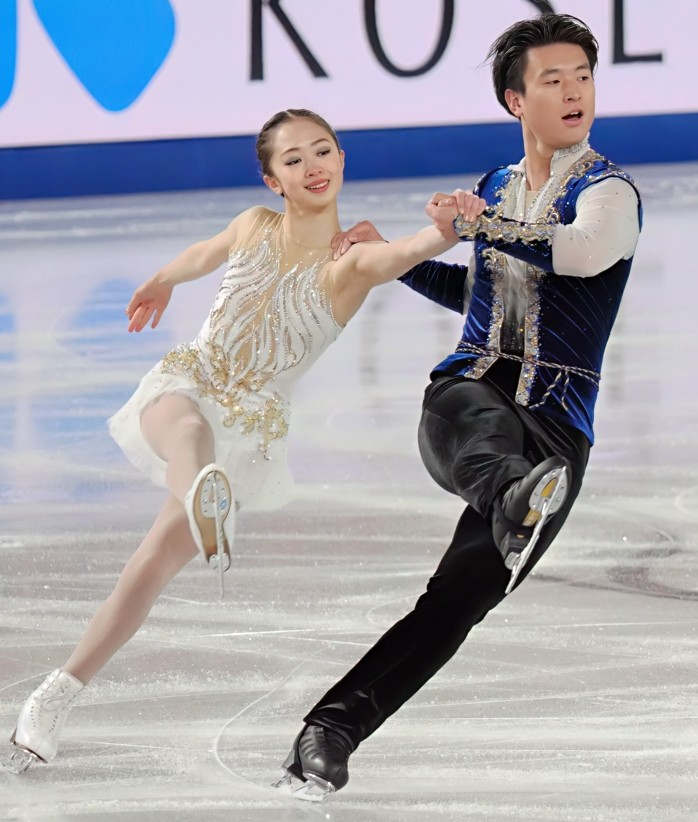
- Sae Shimizu and Lucas Tsuyoshi Honda performing their short program at the 2024–25 Junior Grand Prix Final

Personal information
- Native name: 清水咲衣
- Born: August 10, 2005 (age 21) Osaka, Japan
- Home town: Uji, Kyoto
- Height: 1.55 m (5 ft 1 in)

Figure skating career
- Country: Japan
- Discipline: Pair skating (since 2023); Women's singles (2015–24)
- Partner: Lucas Tsuyoshi Honda (2023–25)
- Coach: Taijin Hiraike; Yukako Sugita; Akari Sugita
- Skating club: Doshisha University
Japan Championships
Bronze medal – third place	2024–25 Osaka	Pairs

Sae Shimizu (清水咲衣, Shimizu Sae; born August 10, 2005) is a Japanese figure skater.

With former pair skating partner, Lucas Tsuyoshi Honda, she is the 2024–25 Japan national bronze medalist, two-time Japan Junior national champion (2023, 2024), and the 2024 JGP Turkey bronze medalist.

== Personal life ==
Shimizu was born on August 10, 2005, in Osaka, Japan. In addition to figure skating, Shimizu enjoys sewing, cooking, and visiting shrines as hobbies.

She graduated from Renaissance Osaka High School in 2024, before enrolling at Doshisha University's Faculty of Sport and Health Sciences.

Her figure skating idol is Alena Kostornaia.

== Career ==
=== Early career ===
Shimizu began figure skating at the age of four after watching the sport on TV with her mom and wanting to try it for herself. She soon joined the Osaka Skate Club and was coached by Mie Hamada.

As a singles skater, Shimizu competed at the basic novice level at the 2015–16 and 2016–17 Japan Basic Novice Championships, finishing thirty-first and fifteenth, respectively. Going on to compete as an advanced novice level skater, Shimizu placed twenty-fifth at the 2017–18 Japan Advanced Novice Championships and eighth at the 2018–19 Japan Advanced Novice Championships.

Following her coach Mie Hamada's transfer from the Kansai University Skating Club in Takatsuki, Osaka to the Kinoshita Academy in Uji, Kyoto, Shimizu made the move as well to continue working with Hamada.

As a junior skater, Shimizu competed at the 2020–21, 2021–22, and 2022–23 Japan Junior Championships, placing sixteenth, thirteenth, and eleventh, respectively.

=== Pair skating with Honda ===
==== 2023–24 season ====
In early 2023, Shimizu decided to spectate a pair skating tryout that had been organized by Bruno Marcotte to help fellow Kinoshita Academy skater, Lucas Tsuyoshi Honda, find a partner. During the session, Marcotte approached Shimizu, asking if she wanted to try skating with Honda. Shimizu ended up agreeing to this and soon after, she and Honda decided to form a partnership. Their partnership was officially announced in May 2023. It was also announced that the pair would continue training under their singles skating coach, Mie Hamada, while also making trips to Oakville, Ontario, Canada to work with Marcotte and Brian Shales as well as train alongside World Champions Riku Miura/Ryuichi Kihara. Upon partnering with Honda, Shimizu changed her affiliation from the Osaka Skate Club to the Kinoshita Academy.

The pair made their debut at the 2023 Japan Eastern Sectional Championships, which they won, before going on to also win the 2023–24 Japan Junior Championships.

In October, Shimizu finished third in the women's singles discipline at the 2023 Japan Western Sectional Championships. With this result, she qualified for the senior-level Japan Championships for the first time. She would go on to finish eighteenth at the 2023–24 Japan Championships.

Shimizu/Honda were selected to compete at the 2024 World Junior Championships on the condition that they earn the minimum technical element scores to compete. Competing at the 2024 Bavarian Open, the pair finished eleventh, earning these minimum scores in the process. Going on to compete at the World Junior Championships, the pair placed fourteenth.

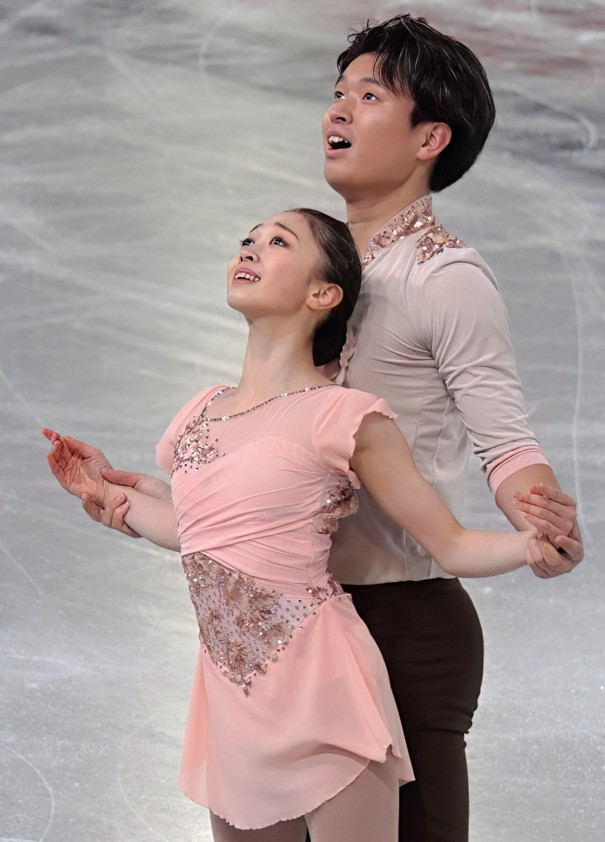
Shimizu/Honda during their free skate at the 2024–25 Junior Grand Prix Final

==== 2024–25 season ====
Competing on the 2024–25 ISU Junior Grand Prix circuit, the pair finished fourth at 2024 JGP Czech Republic and won the bronze medal at 2024 JGP Turkey. These results allowed the pair to qualify for the 2024–25 Junior Grand Prix Final in Grenoble, France.

In late November, the pair competed at the 2024–25 Japan Junior Championships, where they won the national title for a second consecutive time. This result ensured their qualification to compete at the senior championships. Going on to compete at the Junior Grand Prix Final, Shimizu/Honda scored personal bests in all three competition segments and finished fifth overall. Two weeks later, they competed at the 2024–25 Japan Championships. During their free skate, the pair stopped the performance after Shimizu dislocated her left shoulder following a fall during their attempted side-by-side jump combination. She then had her shoulder popped back into place so the pair could finish their performance. They would win the bronze medal overall and were subsequently named the World Junior team. Shimizu/Honda were also named to the World team on the condition that they could achieve the minimum technical element scores to compete at the event, which they were unable to do.

They concluded the season with an eleventh-place finish at the 2025 World Junior Championships in Debrecen, Hungary.

In April, the pair announced they had parted ways with Shimizu intending to focus on singles skating.

==== 2025–26 season ====
At the 2025–26 Japan Championships, Shimizu placed twenty-seventh in the short program and did not advance to the free skate segment.

== Programs ==
=== Singles skating ===
Season	Short program	Free skating
2025–2026	Nocturne in E flat major, op. 9 no. 2 by Frédéric Chopin choreo. by Koshiro Shimada	The Phantom of the Opera by Andrew Lloyd Webber choreo. by Akiko Suzuki
2023–2024	Malagueña performed by Ernesto Lecuona choreo. by Cathy Reed	Un Sospiro by Franz Liszt choreo. by Cathy Reed
2022–2023	Dark Eyes (Russian Folk Music) choreo. by Cathy Reed	Un Sospiro by Franz Liszt choreo. by Cathy Reed
2022–2023	Dark Eyes (Russian Folk Music) choreo. by Cathy Reed	La campanella by Franz Liszt choreo. by Cathy Reed

=== Pair skating with Lucas Tsuyoshi Honda ===
Season	Short program	Free skating
2024–2025	Music Box: Wind Up by Dr. Sound FX; Swan Lake (Music Box Hollywood Sound Effects) by Pyotr Ilyich Tchaikovsky; Swan Lake Theme performed by David Garrett choreo. by Cathy Reed	Photograph / Clair de Lune by Claude Debussy & Cody Fry; Fantasietta on a Theme from “Photograph” by Cody Fry choreo. by Cathy Reed
2023–2024	Music Box: Wind Up by Dr. Sound FX; Swan Lake (Music Box Hollywood Sound Effects) by Pyotr Ilyich Tchaikovsky; Swan Lake Theme performed by David Garrett choreo. by Cathy Reed	West Side Story; The Dance at the Gym: Blues, Promenade; Maria; Balcony Scene (Tonight) by Leonard Bernstein & Stephen Sondheim performed by Rachel Zegler & Ansel Elgort choreo. by Cathy Reed

== Competitive highlights ==
- JGP – Event of the ISU Junior Grand Prix Series
- TBD – Assigned

Competition placements at senior level
Season	2023–24	2025–26
Japan Championships	18th	27th

Competition placements at junior level
Season	2020–21	2021–22	2022–23
Japan Championships	16th	13th	11th

=== Pair skating with Honda ===
International
Event	23–24	24–25
Asian Winter Games		6th
International: Junior
Junior Worlds	14th	11th
JGP Final		5th
JGP Czech Republic		4th
JGP Turkey		3rd
Bavarian Open	11th	
National
Japan		3rd
Japan Junior	1st	1st

== Detailed results ==
=== Singles skating ===
==== Senior level ====
2025–26 season
Date	Event	SP	FS	Total
December 18–21, 2025	2025–26 Japan Championships	27; 51.39	–	27; 51.39
2023–24 season
Date	Event	SP	FS	Total
December 20–24, 2023	2023–24 Japan Championships	18; 56.24	17; 112.88	18; 169.12

==== Junior level ====
2022–23 season
Date	Event	SP	FS	Total
November 25–27, 2022	2022–23 Japan Junior Championships	15; 51.77	11; 99.12	11; 150.89
2021–22 season
Date	Event	SP	FS	Total
November 19–21, 2021	2021–22 Japan Junior Championships	19; 50.06	12; 99.01	13; 149.07
2020–21 season
Date	Event	SP	FS	Total
November 21–23, 2020	2020–21 Japan Junior Championships	23; 45.03	10; 93.41	16; 138.44

ISU personal best scores in the +5/-5 GOE System
Segment	Type	Score	Event
Total	**TSS**	**145.66**	2024–25 JGP Final
Short program	**TSS**	**50.20**	2024–25 JGP Final
Short program	TES	26.58	2024–25 JGP Final
Short program	PCS	24.22	2025 World Junior Championships
Free skating	**TSS**	**95.46**	2024–25 JGP Final
Free skating	TES	48.57	2024 JGP Turkey
Free skating	PCS	48.73	2024–25 JGP Final

=== Pair skating with Lucas Tsuyoshi Honda ===
==== Senior level ====
Current personal best scores are highlighted in bold.

2024–25 season
Date	Event	SP	FS	Total
February 11–13, 2025	2025 Asian Winter Games	6; 45.69	6; 89.89	6; 135.58
December 19–22, 2024	2024–25 Japan Championships	3; 54.22	3; 82.50	3; 136.72

==== Junior level ====
Current personal best scores are highlighted in bold.

2024–25 season
Date	Event	SP	FS	Total
February 26–March 3, 2025	2025 World Junior Championships	11; 49.33	10; 92.50	11; 141.83
December 5–8, 2024	2024–25 JGP Final	5; **50.20**	4; **95.46**	5; **145.66**
November 15–17, 2024	2024–25 Japan Junior Championships	1; 48.51	1; 84.34	1; 132.83
September 18–21, 2024	2024 JGP Turkey	4; 48.04	3; 92.15	3; 140.19
September 4–7, 2024	2024 JGP Czech Republic	7; 44.96	3; 91.33	4; 136.29
2023–24 season
Date	Event	SP	FS	Total
February 26–March 3, 2024	2024 World Junior Championships	14; 43.69	14; 72.08	14; 115.77
January 1–February 4, 2024	2024 Bavarian Open	12; 39.82	7; 77.22	11; 117.04
November 17–19, 2023	2023–24 Japan Junior Championships	1; 40.00	1; 69.69	1; 109.69
