= Kaoruko Wada =

Japanese figure skater (born 2009)

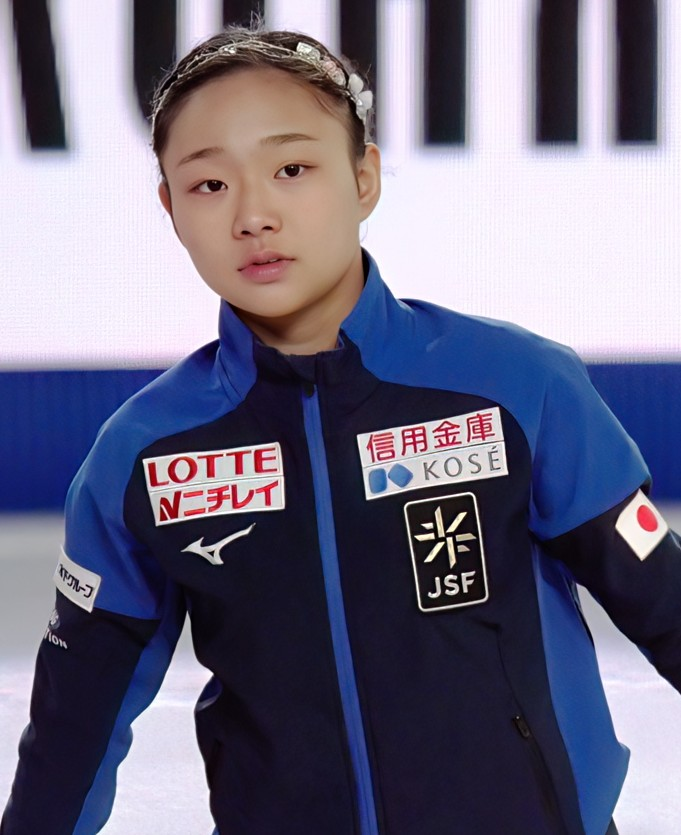
- Kaoruko Wada at the 2024–25 Junior Grand Prix Final

Personal information
- Native name: 和田薫子
- Born: May 13, 2009 (age 17) Nagoya, Aichi Prefecture, Japan
- Home town: Nagoya
- Height: 1.48 m (4 ft 10 in)

Figure skating career
- Country: Japan
- Coach: Machiko Yamada; Yuko Hongo; Soshi Tanaka
- Skating club: Grand-Prix Tokai FSC
- Began skating: 2014
Junior Grand Prix Final
Silver medal – second place	2024–25 Grenoble	Singles

Kaoruko Wada (和田薫子, Wada Kaoruko; born May 13, 2009) is a Japanese figure skater. She is the 2024–25 Junior Grand Prix Final silver medalist, 2024 JGP Czech Republic champion, the 2024 JGP Poland silver medalist, and the 2024–25 Japanese Junior national silver medalist.

== Personal life ==
Wada was born on May 13, 2009, in Nagoya, Japan. She attended Nagoya Municipal Maezu Junior High School before enrolling at Chukyo University Senior High School.

== Career ==
=== Early career ===
Wada began figure skating in 2014 at the age of five after watching Mao Asada compete at the 2014 Winter Olympics and subsequently getting Asada's autograph. Soon after beginning to skate, she began training under Machiko Yamada, who had previously coached Asada during the early years of her career.

On the basic novice level, Wada finished twenty-fourth at the 2018–19 Japan Novice B Championships and the following year, finished fourth at the 2019–20 Japan Novice B Championships.

As an advanced novice skater, she placed sixth at the 2020–21 Japan Novice A Championships and won the silver at the 2021–22 Japan Novice A Championships. Following the latter event, Wada competed at the 2021–22 Japan Junior Championships, where she finished eleventh.

During the subsequent seasons, Wada would finish tenth at the 2022–23 Japan Junior Championships and thirteenth at the 2023–24 Japan Junior Championships.

=== 2024–25 season ===
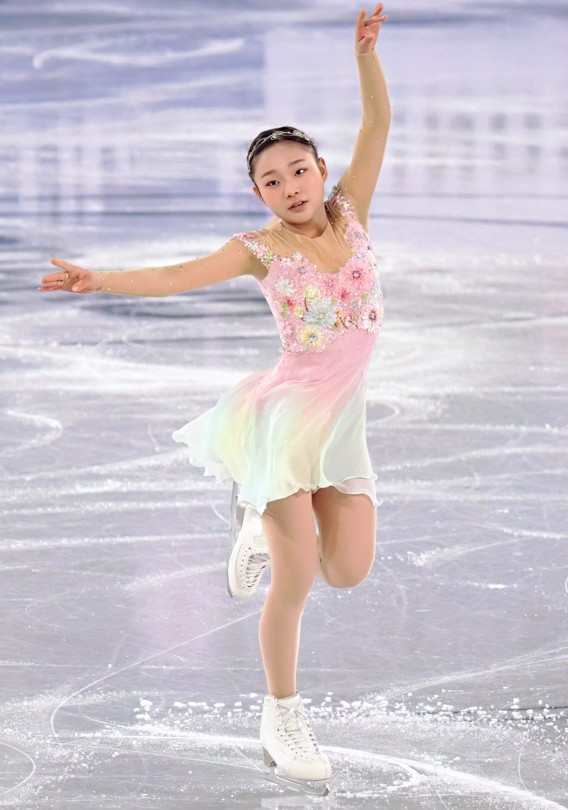
Wada performing her short program at the 2024–25 Junior Grand Prix Final

Making her international debut on the 2024–25 Junior Grand Prix circuit, Wada unexpectedly took gold at 2024 JGP Czech Republic, defeating reigning World Junior bronze medalist Rena Uezono. Following the event, she said, "I didn't expect to win this title, and I enjoyed performing the short program and the free skating. It was amazing. I found some room to improve through this competition, so I will practice more and I want to enjoy performing more and show better performances to the audience." Wada would go on to take silver behind reigning World Junior champion Mao Shimada at 2024 JGP Poland. With these results, Wada qualified for the 2024–25 Junior Grand Prix Final.

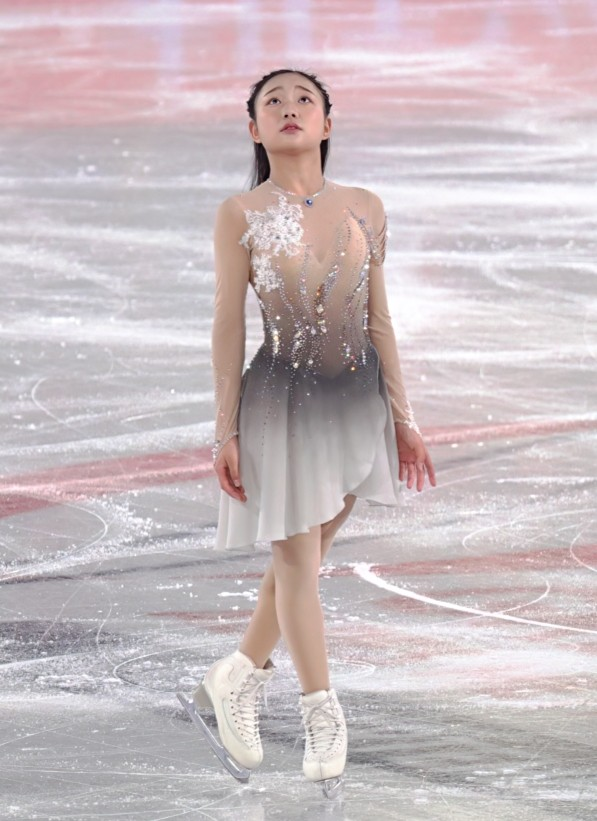
Wada during her free skate at the 2024–25 Junior Grand Prix Final

In late November, Wada competed at the 2024–25 Japan Junior Championships, where she won the silver medal. Weeks later, Wada competed at the JGP Final in Grenoble, France. She placed second in both the short program and free skate, winning the silver medal overall and sharing the podium with fellow Japanese skaters, Mao Shimada and Ami Nakai. Wada expressed delight at this result, saying that this "was my first participation in the JGP final but Ami and Mao helped me a lot. This is why I think it was possible to achieve this result as a team." Two weeks later, Wada made her senior level debut at the 2024–25 Japan Championships, where she finished in tenth place.

Wada finished her season at the 2025 World Junior Championships in Debrecen, Hungary, where she placed fifth in the short program, less than three points back of third place. During the free skate, despite landing all her jumps, the judges determined that five of those jumps were landed on the quarter and two other jumps were underrotated. As a result, Wada placed ninth in the free skate segment and dropped to eighth place overall. Following the event, she said, "There were some things I was a bit unsure about in terms of my score, but I was very satisfied with my performance itself, so I’m glad."

=== 2025–26 season ===
Wada opened the season by competing on the 2025–26 Junior Grand Prix series, finishing fourth at 2025 JGP Italy and sixth at 2025 JGP Poland.

In late November, she competed at the 2025–26 Japan Junior Championships, where he finished in ninth place overall. With this placement, Wada was invited to compete at the senior national championships, where she finished in nineteenth place.

=== 2026–27 season ===
Wada begin her international season by competing at the 2026–27 Junior Grand Prix series, where she finished 8th in 2026 JGP China.

== Programs ==
Season	Short program	Free skating	Exhibition
2026–2027	Never Enough (from "The Greatest Showman") by Loren Allred, Benj Pasek & Justin Paul choreo. by Noriko Sato	On My Own (from "Les Miserables") by Claude-Michel Schönberg choreo. by Kenji Miyamoto	
2025–2026	L'alba verrà (The Dawn Will Come) by Katherine Jenkins & Frédéric Chopin choreo. by Noriko Sato	Titanic; Never An Absolution; Southampton by James Horner; Titanic Symphony by Richard Clayderman; Hard to Starboard by James Horner choreo. by Kenji Miyamoto; Piano Sonata No.0 (SOUMEI) by Hayato Sumino choreo. by Kenji Miyamoto	
2024–2025	How Does a Moment Last Forever by Tim Rice & Alan Menken performed by Celine Dion choreo. by Noriko Sato	Titanic; Never An Absolution; Southampton by James Horner; Titanic Symphony by Richard Clayderman; Hard to Starboard by James Horner choreo. by Kenji Miyamoto	Don't You Worry 'bout a Thing (from Sing) performed by Tori Kelly
2023–2024	How Does a Moment Last Forever by Tim Rice & Alan Menken performed by Celine Dion choreo. by Noriko Sato	Sing For Me by Tarja, Kid Crazy, Christel Sundberg, & Tracy Lipp choreo. by Kenji Miyamoto	
2022–2023	Reflection; Steps; Moving by Secret Garden choreo. by Akiko Suzuki	Masquerade Waltz by Aram Khachaturian choreo. by Mihoko Higuchi, Yuko Hongo, & Machiko Yamada	

== Competitive highlights ==
- JGP – Event of the ISU Grand Prix Series
- TBD – Assigned
- WD – Withdrew from competition

Competition placements at senior level
Season	2024–25	2025–26
Japan Championships	10th	19th

Competition placements at junior level
Season	2021–22	2022–23	2023–24	2024–25	2025–26	2026–27
World Junior Championships				8th		
Junior Grand Prix Final				2nd		
Japan Championships	11th	10th	13th	2nd	9th	
JGP China						8th
JGP Czech Republic				1st		
JGP Italy					4th	
JGP Poland				2nd	6th	

== Detailed results ==
ISU personal best scores in the +5/-5 GOE System
Segment	Type	Score	Event
Total	**TSS**	**198.22**	2024 JGP Poland
Short program	**TSS**	**70.58**	2024 JGP Poland
Short program	TES	40.65	2024 JGP Poland
Short program	PCS	29.93	2024 JGP Poland
Free skating	**TSS**	**127.64**	2024 JGP Poland
Free skating	TES	68.40	2024 JGP Czech Republic
Free skating	PCS	59.54	2024 JGP Poland

=== Senior level ===
Results in the 2024-25 season
Date	Event	SP		FS		Total	
Date	Event	P	Score	P	Score	P	Score
Dec 19–22, 2024	2024–25 Japan Championships	10	66.70	8	128.93	10	195.63

Results in the 2025–26 season
Date	Event	SP		FS		Total	
Date	Event	P	Score	P	Score	P	Score
Dec 18–21, 2025	2025–26 Japan Championships	17	60.82	21	110.08	19	170.90

=== Junior level ===
Current personal best scores are highlighted in bold.

2026–27 season
Date	Event	SP	FS	Total
22–24 November 2025	2026 JGP China	4; 66.10	10; 104.29	8; 170.39
2025–26 season
Date	Event	SP	FS	Total
22–24 November 2025	2025–26 Japan Junior Championships	10; 55.10	7; 116.66	9; 171.76
October 1–4, 2025	2025 JGP Poland	8; 53.41	6; 113.36	6; 166.77
September 3–6, 2025	2025 JGP Italy	6; 58.66	2; 122.17	4; 180.83
2024–25 season
Date	Event	SP	FS	Total
February 25–March 2, 2025	2025 World Junior Championships	5; 64.35	9; 117.30	8; 181.65
December 5–8, 2024	2024–25 JGP Final	2; 67.77	2; 123.98	2; 191.75
November 15–17, 2024	2024–25 Japan Junior Championships	2; 66.40	4; 123.77	2; 190.17
September 25–28, 2024	2024 JGP Poland	2; **70.58**	2; **127.64**	2; **198.22**
September 4–9, 2024	2024 JGP Czech Republic	1; 67.21	1; 126.93	1; 194.14
2023–24 season
Date	Event	SP	FS	Total
November 17–19, 2023	2023–24 Japan Junior Championships	7; 60.26	15; 97.61	13; 157.87
2022–23 season
Date	Event	SP	FS	Total
November 25–27, 2022	2022–23 Japan Junior Championships	9; 57.37	10; 101.21	10; 158.58
2021–22 season
Date	Event	SP	FS	Total
November 19–21, 2021	2021–22 Japan Junior Championships	12; 52.89	9; 103.88	11; 156.77
