= 2024–25 Grand Prix of Figure Skating Final =

Figure skating competition

2024–25 Grand Prix Final
- Type: Grand Prix
- Date: December 5 – 8
- Season: 2024–25
- Location: Grenoble, France
- Host: Fédération Française des Sports de Glace
- Venue: Patinoire Polesud

Champions
- Men's singles: (United States) Ilia Malinin (Senior) (United States) Jacob Sanchez (Junior)
- Women's singles: (United States) Amber Glenn (Senior) (Japan) Mao Shimada (Junior)
- Pairs: (Germany) Minerva Fabienne Hase and Nikita Volodin (Senior) (China) Zhang Jiaxuan and Huang Yihang (Junior)
- Ice dance: (United States) Madison Chock and Evan Bates (Senior) (Italy) Noemi Tali and Noah Lafornara (Junior)
- Previous: 2023–24 Grand Prix Final
- Next: 2025–26 Grand Prix Final
- Previous Grand Prix: 2024 Cup of China

The 2024–25 Grand Prix of Figure Skating Final and ISU Junior Grand Prix Final was held from December 5–8, 2024, at the Patinoire Polesud in Grenoble, France. The combined event was the culmination of two international series: the Grand Prix of Figure Skating and the Junior Grand Prix. Medals were awarded in men's singles, women's singles, pair skating, and ice dance at both the senior and junior levels.

The Grand Prix Final was originally to be held in Orléans, France, but the French Federation of Ice Sports chose to relocate the event to Grenoble.

== Qualifiers ==
=== Senior qualifiers ===
No.	Men	Women	Pairs	Ice dance
1	(United States); Ilia Malinin	(Japan); Kaori Sakamoto	(Canada); Deanna Stellato-Dudek; Maxime Deschamps; (withdrew)	(United Kingdom); Lilah Fear; Lewis Gibson
2	(Japan); Yuma Kagiyama	(United States); Amber Glenn	(Japan); Riku Miura; Ryuichi Kihara	(United States); Madison Chock; Evan Bates
3	(Japan); Shun Sato	(Japan); Wakaba Higuchi	(Germany); Minerva Fabienne Hase; Nikita Volodin	(Canada); Piper Gilles; Paul Poirier
4	(France); Adam Siao Him Fa; (withdrew)	(Japan); Hana Yoshida	(Italy); Sara Conti; Niccolò Macii	(Italy); Charlène Guignard; Marco Fabbri
5	(France); Kévin Aymoz	(Japan); Mone Chiba	(Georgia (country)); Anastasiia Metelkina; Luka Berulava	(France); Evgenia Lopareva; Geoffrey Brissaud
6	(Italy); Daniel Grassl	(Japan); Rino Matsuike	(United States); Ellie Kam; Danny O'Shea	(Canada); Marjorie Lajoie; Zachary Lagha

Alternates

No.	Men	Women	Pairs	Ice dance
1	(Kazakhstan); Mikhail Shaidorov; (called up)	(Japan); Rinka Watanabe	(Italy); Rebecca Ghilardi; Filippo Ambrosini; (called up)	(United States); Christina Carreira; Anthony Ponomarenko
2	(United States); Andrew Torgashev	(South Korea); Kim Chae-yeon	(Hungary); Maria Pavlova; Alexei Sviatchenko	(Spain); Olivia Smart; Tim Dieck
3	(Japan); Koshiro Shimada	(Japan); Rion Sumiyoshi	(United States); Alisa Efimova; Misha Mitrofanov	(Lithuania); Allison Reed; Saulius Ambrulevičius

=== Junior qualifiers ===
No.	Men	Women	Pairs	Ice dance
1	(United States); Jacob Sanchez	(Japan); Mao Shimada	(China); Zhang Jiaxuan; Huang Yihang	(Italy); Noemi Maria Tali; Noah Lafornara
2	(Japan); Rio Nakata	(Japan); Ami Nakai	(Canada); Jazmine Desrochers; Kieran Thrasher	(Ukraine); Iryna Pidgaina; Artem Koval
3	(Japan); Sena Takahashi	(Japan); Kaoruko Wada	(United States); Olivia Flores; Luke Wang	(France); Célina Fradji; Jean-Hans Fourneaux
4	(New Zealand); Yanhao Li	(South Korea); Kim Yu-seong	(France); Romane Télémaque; Lucas Coulon	(United States); Katarina Wolfkostin; Dimitry Tsarevski
5	(South Korea); Seo Min-kyu	(China); Wang Yihan	(Canada); Julia Quattrocchi; Simon Desmarais	(Germany); Darya Grimm; Michail Savitskiy
6	(Slovakia); Lukáš Václavík	(France); Stefania Gladki	(Japan); Sae Shimizu; Lucas Tsuyoshi Honda	(United States); Elliana Peal; Ethan Peal

Alternates

No.	Men	Women	Pairs	Ice dance
1	(Slovakia); Adam Hagara	(South Korea); Shin Ji-a	(France); Louise Ehrhard; Matthis Pellegris	(United States); Caroline Mullen; Brendan Mullen
2	(China); Tian Tonghe	(Japan); Mei Okada	(United States); Elizabeth Hansen; William Church	(United States); Hana Maria Aboian; Daniil Veselukhin
3	(Japan); Shunsuke Nakamura	(South Korea); Ko Na-yeon	(China); Zhang Xuanqi; Feng Wenqiang	(France); Ambre Perrier Gianesini; Samuel Blanc Klaperman

=== Changes to preliminary assignments ===
Discipline	Withdrew		Added		Notes	Ref.
Discipline	Date	Skater(s)	Date	Skater(s)	Notes	Ref.
Senior men	November 27	(France); Adam Siao Him Fa	November 27	(Kazakhstan); Mikhail Shaidorov	Injury	
Pairs	December 2	(Canada); Deanna Stellato-Dudek; Maxime Deschamps	December 2	(Italy); Rebecca Ghilardi; Filippo Ambrosini	Illness (Deschamps)	

== Medal summary ==
=== Senior medalists ===
Discipline	Gold	Silver	Bronze
Men	(United States); Ilia Malinin	(Japan); Yuma Kagiyama	(Japan); Shun Sato
Women	(United States); Amber Glenn	(Japan); Mone Chiba	(Japan); Kaori Sakamoto
Pairs	(Germany); Minerva Fabienne Hase; Nikita Volodin	(Japan); Riku Miura; Ryuichi Kihara	(Georgia (country)); Anastasiia Metelkina; Luka Berulava
Ice dance	(United States); Madison Chock; Evan Bates	(Italy); Charlène Guignard; Marco Fabbri	(United Kingdom); Lilah Fear; Lewis Gibson

=== Junior medalists ===
Discipline	Gold	Silver	Bronze
Men	(United States); Jacob Sanchez	(South Korea); Seo Min-kyu	(Japan); Rio Nakata
Women	(Japan); Mao Shimada	(Japan); Kaoruko Wada	(Japan); Ami Nakai
Pairs	(China); Zhang Jiaxuan; Huang Yihang	(United States); Olivia Flores; Luke Wang	(Canada); Jazmine Desrochers; Kieran Thrasher
Ice dance	(Italy); Noemi Tali; Noah Lafornara	(United States); Katarina Wolfkostin; Dimitry Tsarevski	(Germany); Darya Grimm; Michail Savitskiy

=== Medals table ===
==== Senior ====
Rank	Nation	Gold	Silver	Bronze	Total
1	United States	3	0	0	3
2	Germany	1	0	0	1
3	Japan	0	3	2	5
4	Italy	0	1	0	1
5	Georgia	0	0	1	1
5	Great Britain	0	0	1	1
Totals (6 entries)		4	4	4	12

==== Junior ====
Rank	Nation	Gold	Silver	Bronze	Total
1	United States	1	2	0	3
2	Japan	1	1	2	4
3	China	1	0	0	1
3	Italy	1	0	0	1
5	South Korea	0	1	0	1
6	Canada	0	0	1	1
6	Germany	0	0	1	1
Totals (7 entries)		4	4	4	12

== Senior results ==
=== Men's singles ===
In the free skate, Ilia Malinin attempted to perform all six figure skating jumps (toe loop, Salchow, loop, flip, Lutz, and Axel) as quadruple jumps for the first time in skating history, although not all were entirely successful due to under-rotations and a fall on his initial quadruple Lutz.

Senior men's results
Rank	Skater	Nation	Total points	SP		FS	
1st place, gold medalist(s)	Ilia Malinin	United States	292.12	1	105.43	2	186.69
2nd place, silver medalist(s)	Yuma Kagiyama	Japan	281.78	2	93.49	1	188.29
3rd place, bronze medalist(s)	Shun Sato	Japan	270.82	4	86.28	3	184.54
4	Daniel Grassl	Italy	254.96	5	81.76	4	173.20
5	Mikhail Shaidorov	Kazakhstan	253.75	3	91.26	6	162.49
6	Kévin Aymoz	France	238.63	6	68.82	5	169.81

=== Women's singles ===
Senior women's results
Rank	Skater	Nation	Total points	SP		FS	
1st place, gold medalist(s)	Amber Glenn	United States	212.07	1	70.04	1	142.03
2nd place, silver medalist(s)	Mone Chiba	Japan	208.85	2	69.33	2	139.52
3rd place, bronze medalist(s)	Kaori Sakamoto	Japan	201.13	4	63.98	3	137.15
4	Wakaba Higuchi	Japan	195.96	6	61.61	4	134.35
5	Hana Yoshida	Japan	194.02	3	64.23	5	129.79
6	Rino Matsuike	Japan	189.02	5	62.63	6	126.39

=== Pairs ===
Senior pairs' results
Rank	Team	Nation	Total points	SP		FS	
1st place, gold medalist(s)	Minerva Fabienne Hase; Nikita Volodin	Germany	218.10	1	76.72	1	141.38
2nd place, silver medalist(s)	Riku Miura; Ryuichi Kihara	Japan	206.71	2	76.27	3	130.44
3rd place, bronze medalist(s)	Anastasiia Metelkina; Luka Berulava	Georgia	205.78	3	72.26	2	133.52
4	Sara Conti; Niccolò Macii	Italy	200.06	4	70.49	4	129.57
5	Ellie Kam; Danny O'Shea	United States	198.26	5	68.91	5	129.35
6	Rebecca Ghilardi; Filippo Ambrosini	Italy	181.52	6	65.80	6	115.72

=== Ice dance ===
Senior ice dance results
Rank	Team	Nation	Total points	RD		FD	
1st place, gold medalist(s)	Madison Chock; Evan Bates	United States	219.85	1	87.73	1	132.12
2nd place, silver medalist(s)	Charlène Guignard; Marco Fabbri	Italy	206.11	2	83.12	3	122.99
3rd place, bronze medalist(s)	Lilah Fear; Lewis Gibson	Great Britain	205.18	3	82.31	4	122.87
4	Marjorie Lajoie; Zachary Lagha	Canada	199.84	4	77.73	5	122.11
5	Piper Gilles; Paul Poirier	Canada	199.27	6	72.15	2	127.12
6	Evgenia Lopareva; Geoffrey Brissaud	France	195.91	5	76.98	6	118.93

== Junior results ==
=== Men's singles ===
Junior men's results
Rank	Skater	Nation	Total points	SP		FS	
1st place, gold medalist(s)	Jacob Sanchez	United States	227.38	2	79.24	2	148.14
2nd place, silver medalist(s)	Seo Min-kyu	South Korea	222.14	5	69.68	1	152.46
3rd place, bronze medalist(s)	Rio Nakata	Japan	215.33	1	79.39	4	135.94
4	Sena Takahashi	Japan	204.40	6	61.83	3	142.57
5	Yanhao Li	New Zealand	201.63	4	72.17	5	129.46
6	Lukáš Václavík	Slovakia	176.36	3	72.72	6	103.64

=== Women's singles ===
Junior women's results
Rank	Skater	Nation	Total points	SP		FS	
1st place, gold medalist(s)	Mao Shimada	Japan	199.46	1	73.72	1	125.74
2nd place, silver medalist(s)	Kaoruko Wada	Japan	191.75	2	67.77	2	123.98
3rd place, bronze medalist(s)	Ami Nakai	Japan	189.58	3	67.26	4	122.32
4	Wang Yihan	China	187.90	4	64.52	3	123.38
5	Kim Yu-seong	South Korea	184.23	5	64.42	5	119.81
6	Stefania Gladki	France	175.39	6	62.31	6	113.08

=== Pairs ===
Junior pairs' results
Rank	Team	Nation	Total points	SP		FS	
1st place, gold medalist(s)	Zhang Jiaxuan; Huang Yihang	China	176.09	1	62.94	1	113.15
2nd place, silver medalist(s)	Olivia Flores; Luke Wang	United States	155.82	3	52.04	2	103.78
3rd place, bronze medalist(s)	Jazmine Desrochers; Kieran Thrasher	Canada	152.82	2	55.28	3	97.54
4	Romane Télémaque; Lucas Coulon	France	146.38	4	51.34	5	95.04
5	Sae Shimizu; Lucas Tsuyoshi Honda	Japan	145.66	5	50.20	4	95.46
6	Julia Quattrocchi; Simon Desmarais	Canada	139.13	6	47.70	6	91.43

=== Ice dance ===
Junior ice dance results
Rank	Team	Nation	Total points	RD		FD	
1st place, gold medalist(s)	Noemi Tali; Noah Lafornara	Italy	169.98	1	68.66	1	101.32
2nd place, silver medalist(s)	Katarina Wolfkostin; Dimitry Tsarevski	United States	164.98	2	65.57	2	99.41
3rd place, bronze medalist(s)	Darya Grimm; Michail Savitskiy	Germany	161.86	3	64.84	3	97.02
4	Iryna Pidgaina; Artem Koval	Ukraine	152.27	5	62.36	4	89.91
5	Célina Fradji; Jean-Hans Fourneaux	France	151.70	4	63.24	5	88.46
6	Elliana Peal; Ethan Peal	United States	143.08	6	60.19	6	82.89
