= Rion Sumiyoshi =

Japanese figure skater (born 2003)

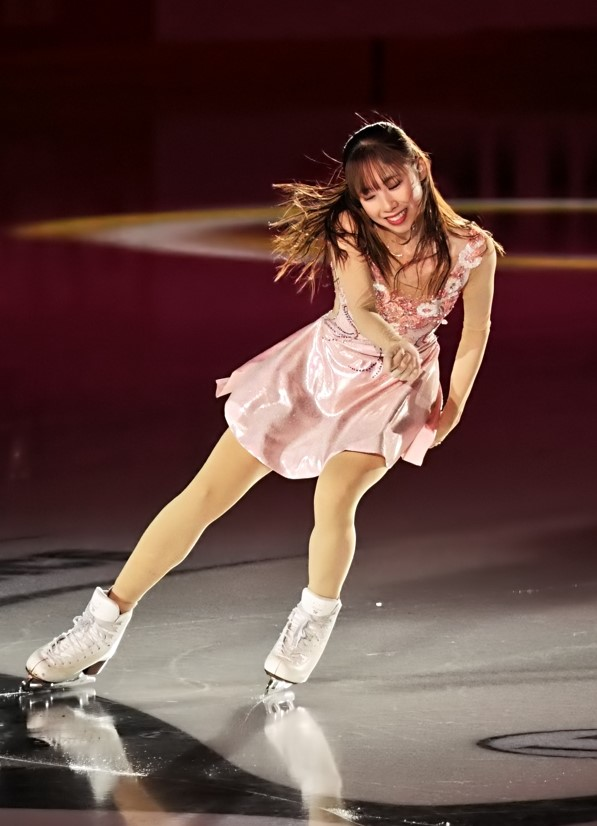
- Sumiyoshi performing her free skate at the 2024 Grand Prix de France

Personal information
- Native name: 住吉 りをん
- Born: 15 August 2003 (age 23) Tokyo, Japan
- Home town: Tokyo
- Height: 1.56 m (5 ft 1 in)

Figure skating career
- Country: Japan
- Coach: Koji Okajima; Noriko Sato; Mio Sato
- Skating club: OrientalBio; Meiji University
- Began skating: 2007

Rion Sumiyoshi (住吉 りをん, Sumiyoshi Rion; born 15 August 2003) is a Japanese figure skater. She is a six-time ISU Grand Prix medalist, the 2025 World University Games champion, and the 2025 CS Lombardia Trophy champion.

At the junior level, she is the 2018 JGP Canada bronze medalist and 2021–22 Japanese Junior silver medalist.

== Personal life ==
Sumiyoshi was born on 15 August 2003 in Tokyo, Japan. Her father passed away from cancer in February 2025.

She currently studies at Meiji University's School of Commerce. She also enjoys cooking.

== Career ==
=== Early years ===
Sumiyoshi began skating in 2007. She won the 2016–17 Japan Novice A Championships and then placed thirteenth at the 2016–17 Japan Junior Championships. She was invited to skate in the gala at the 2016 NHK Trophy and 2017 World Team Trophy as the reigning Japanese national novice champion. Sumiyoshi won a bronze medal at 2017 Bavarian Open in the advanced novice level, Group I.

=== 2018–19 season: Junior Grand Prix bronze ===
Sumiyoshi made her junior debut at the 2018 Asian Open and finished in sixth place. She was assigned to make her Junior Grand Prix debut at the 2018 JGP Canada in Richmond. Sumiyoshi fell twice in the short program, once on footwork and once on her jump combination, and ranked seventh in that segment. She had a clean free skate despite an under-rotation on a jump combination and won the bronze medal behind Russia's Anastasia Tarakanova and Anna Shcherbakova. She was fourth at 2018 JGP Slovenia in Ljubljana and was the third alternate for 2018–19 Junior Grand Prix Final.

Sumiyoshi finished ninth at 2018–19 Japan Junior Championships, concluding her season.

=== 2019–20 season ===
In her lone Junior Grand Prix appearance for the year, Sumiyoshi finished eighth at the 2019 JGP Latvia. She did not compete for the remainder of the season.

=== 2020–21 season ===
With the COVID-19 pandemic greatly limiting junior competition internationally, Sumiyoshi competed at the 2020–21 Japan Junior Championships and placed fifth. She was invited to 2020–21 Japan Championships and finished in twelfth place.

=== 2021–22 season: Junior national silver and senior international debut ===
In light of the pandemic, the Japan Skating Federation opted not to send junior skaters out internationally in the fall of 2021. As a result, Sumiyoshi did not have the opportunity to compete on the Junior Grand Prix. At 2021–22 Japan Junior Championships, Sumiyoshi was first after the short program but won the silver medal overall after a third-place free skate. At 2021–22 Japan Championships, she finished in eighth place.

Sumiyoshi was sent to 2022 Coupe du Printemps, her first international competition as a senior skater, where she won the silver medal behind fellow Japanese skater Rinka Watanabe.

In light of her junior national silver medal and senior nationals placement, Sumiyoshi had been assigned to finish her season at the 2022 World Junior Championships. These were soon disrupted by the Russian invasion of Ukraine. In response to the invasion, the International Skating Union banned all Russian and Belarusian athletes from competing at ISU championships. With the Russian women having dominated the women's discipline in recent years, their absence significantly altered the field at Junior Worlds. However, due to both the invasion and concerns related to the Omicron variant, the World Junior Championships could not be held as scheduled in Sofia in early March, and they were later moved to mid-April in Tallinn, Estonia. Competing in Tallinn, Sumiyoshi qualified to the free skate in ninth position. She rose to eighth place in the free skate.

=== 2022–23 season: Grand Prix bronzes ===
During the 2022–23 figure skating season, Sumiyoshi made her senior debut on the ISU Grand Prix series. At the 2022 Grand Prix de France, she won the bronze medal behind Loena Hendrickx and Kim Ye-lim. She attempted a quad toe loop in the free skate but was unsuccessful. She revealed afterward that "I started practicing the quad toe last summer, and at that point, my success rate was not very good. This year, I was really able to elevate my success rate is about half in terms of landing or stepping out."

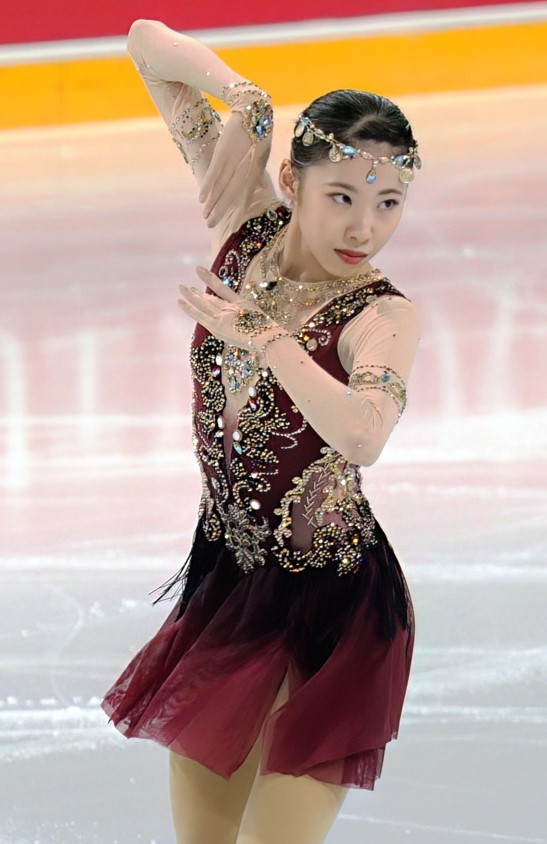
Sumiyoshi performing her short program at the 2023 Grand Prix de France

She gained a second Grand Prix assignment, the 2022 NHK Trophy, as one of her federation's host picks. Competing in Sapporo, Sumiyoshi was third in the short program with a new personal best of 68.01 despite a quarter underrotation call on her jump combination. She fell twice in the free skate, including on her downgraded quad attempt, placing fourth in that segment but remaining third overall by a margin of 4.12 points over American Audrey Shin. She reflected, "considering that this is my first senior Grand Prix and I got third place in both competitions, I am happy. However, regarding my performance today, there were so many regrettable points." Sumiyoshi said she was focused on preparing for the national championships.

Sumiyoshi finished fourteenth at the 2022–23 Japan Championships. Named to the Japanese team for the 2023 Winter World University Games, she came fourth at the event, nine points back of bronze medalist Kim.

=== 2023–24 season ===
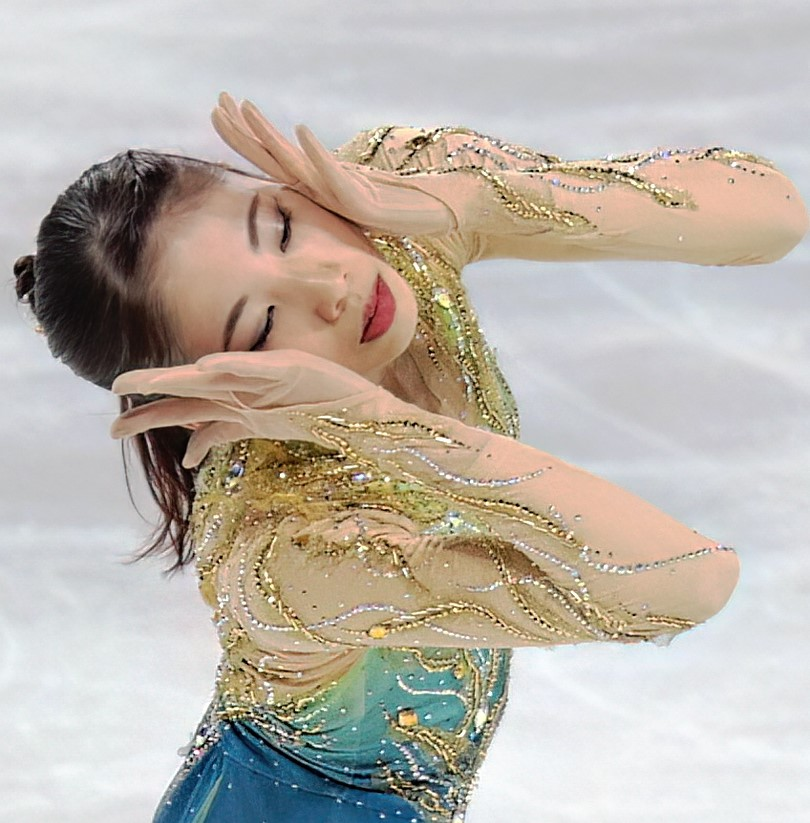
Sumiyoshi during her free program at the 2023 Grand Prix de France

Sumiyoshi was given two assignments on the Grand Prix, starting with a return to the Grand Prix de France, this time in Angers. She placed fifth in the short program after falling on her opening double Axel. In the free skate, Sumiyoshi successfully landed a ratified quadruple toe loop for the first time in competition. She went on to double an attempted triple Salchow and landed another triple jump on the quarter, but she won the free skate with 136.04 points, rising to third overall to claim her third Grand Prix bronze medal. She finished 1.04 points behind silver medalist Nina Pinzarrone of Belgium and said afterward that she was "most happy about the quad toe because I've been working on it," adding that "there were some small mistakes, I think I showed great growth that I was able to put it all together." She was the first Japanese woman to land a quad toe loop, 14th woman to land a quad internationally, and the first woman to land a quad internationally in the 2023–24 season. At the 2023 Grand Prix of Espoo, Sumiyoshi finished narrowly second in the short program behind reigning World champion Kaori Sakamoto. She struggled in the free skate, underrotating her quad attempt and falling on another jumping pass; she landed only three triple jumps. However, she remained second overall despite finishing third in the segment. She admitted to being "a little disappointed about my performance today."

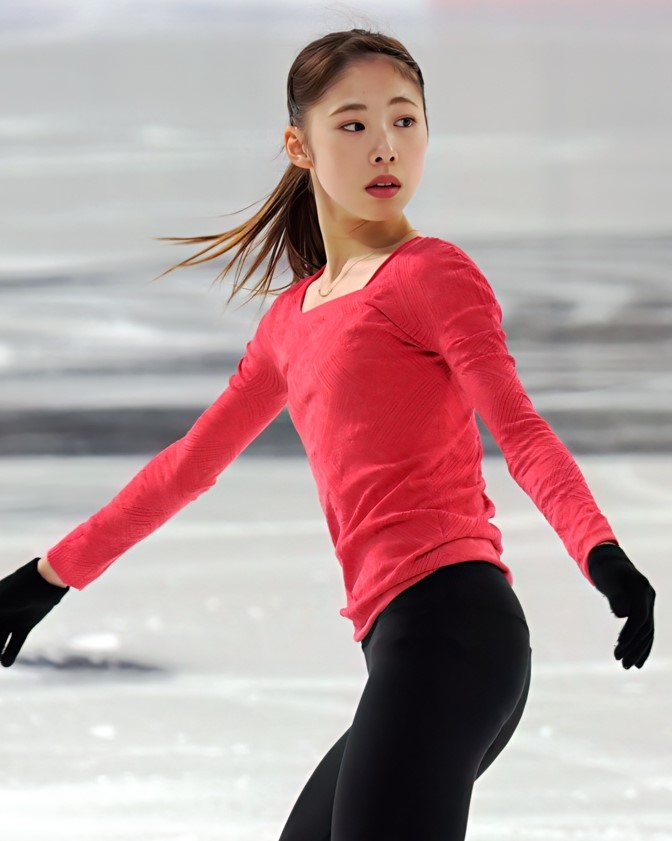
Sumiyoshi during practice at the 2024 Grand Prix de France

At the 2023–24 Grand Prix Final in the short program, Sumiyoshi received a quarter underrotation call on the second half of her jump combination and doubled a planned triple Lutz jump; she finished fifth there. Numerous free skate errors, including a tripled quad attempt, dropped her to sixth place. Sumiyoshi performed poorly in the short program at the 2023–24 Japan Championships, placing seventeenth. She rose to tenth after the free skate.

=== 2024–25 season ===
Sumiyoshi began the season by competing on the Grand Prix series. During her first event at the 2024 Grand Prix de France, she placed fifth in the short program but second in the free skate, where she landed an attempted quad toe loop on two feet. She rose to third place overall, claiming the bronze medal. Sumiyoshi later pointed out that this was the third consecutive time that she had placed fifth in a short program and third overall. “I hoped to climb a bit in the ranking, but I feel like my skating overall improved."

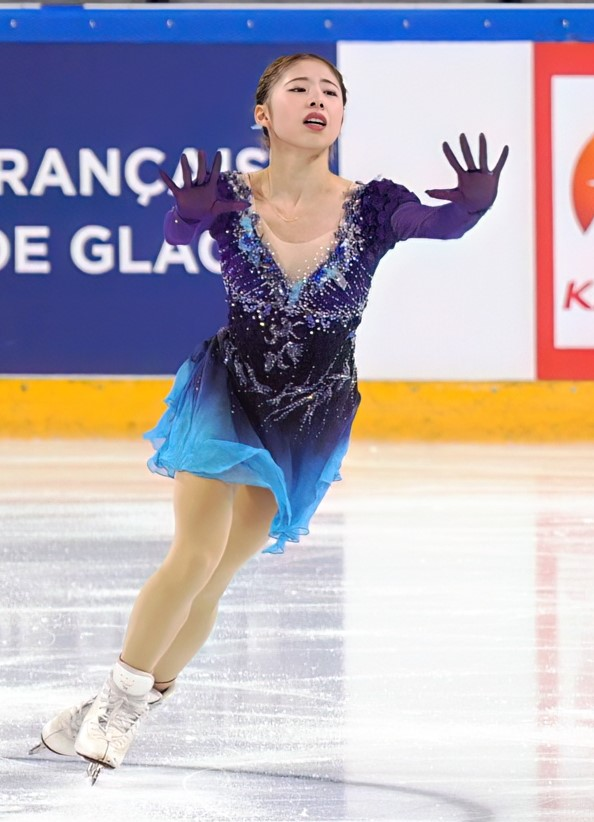
Sumiyoshi performing her short program at the 2024 Grand Prix de France

At her second event, the 2024 Cup of China, she finished third in the short program. In the free skate, she decided not to attempt a quad toe loop and aimed for a clean program; however, she had a poor landing on a triple Lutz and fell on a triple loop jump. She was fourth in the free skate and fell to fourth overall. After the free skate, she said: "I need to do more mental training, and I need to do be more consistent.” She noted that she had been feeling very nervous and that it had affected her performance. She was ultimately named as the third alternate for the 2024–25 Grand Prix Final.

In December, Sumiyoshi competed at the 2024–25 Japan Championships, where she finished eighth and was named as the second alternate for the 2025 World Championship team. One month later, Sumiyoshi competed at the 2025 Winter World University Games, where she placed third in the short program but won the free skate, taking the gold medal overall. She then finished the season by winning silver at the 2025 International Challenge Cup, shortly after her father died of liver cancer.

=== 2025–26 season ===
Sumiyoshi's short program, choreographed by Misha Ge, was dedicated to her deceased father.

Sumiyoshi opened the season in September by taking gold at the 2025 CS Lombardia Trophy. The following month, she placed third at 2025 Grand Prix de France behind Ami Nakai and Kaori Sakamoto, taking her fourth consecutive bronze at this event with all new personal best scores. "I was aiming for a higher placement, but I'm very happy with my performance, so it's like a positive frustration," she said following the event. "Even though I keep finishing third in this competition, my scores are getting higher every year." A few weeks later, Sumiyoshi competed at the 2025 Finlandia Trophy, but struggled throughout the event, taking an unexpected hard fall on her step sequence during the short program and falling on three different jumps during the free skate. She finished seventh at the event overall.

In December, she competed at the 2025–26 Japan Championships, where she placed twenty-first in the short program after stepping out of a planned triple Lutz and then failing to perform a jump combination. She continued to struggle during the free skate, placing eighteenth in that segment and finishing eighteenth overall. After the competition, Sumiyoshi discussed the impact of her father's death earlier that year and stated that she intended to compete for another four years with the goal of competing at the 2030 Winter Olympics.

=== 2026–27 season ===
Sumiyoshi begun her season at the 2026 Grand Prix de France. She placed eighth after the short program due to performing a double flip rather than the planned triple, nullifying the element and its points. Though in the free skate, she performed significantly better and concluded the competition in sixth place overall.

== Programs ==
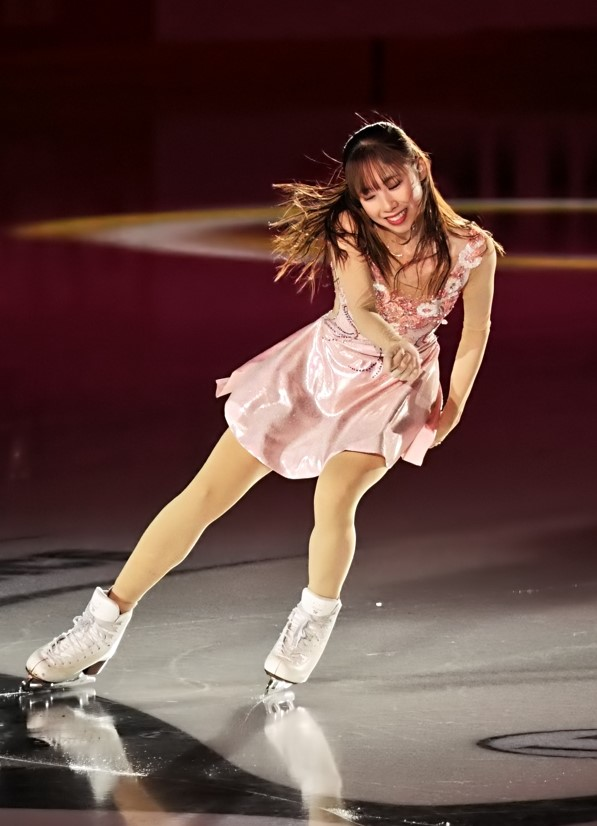
Sumiyoshi performing her exhibition program at the 2024 Grand Prix de France

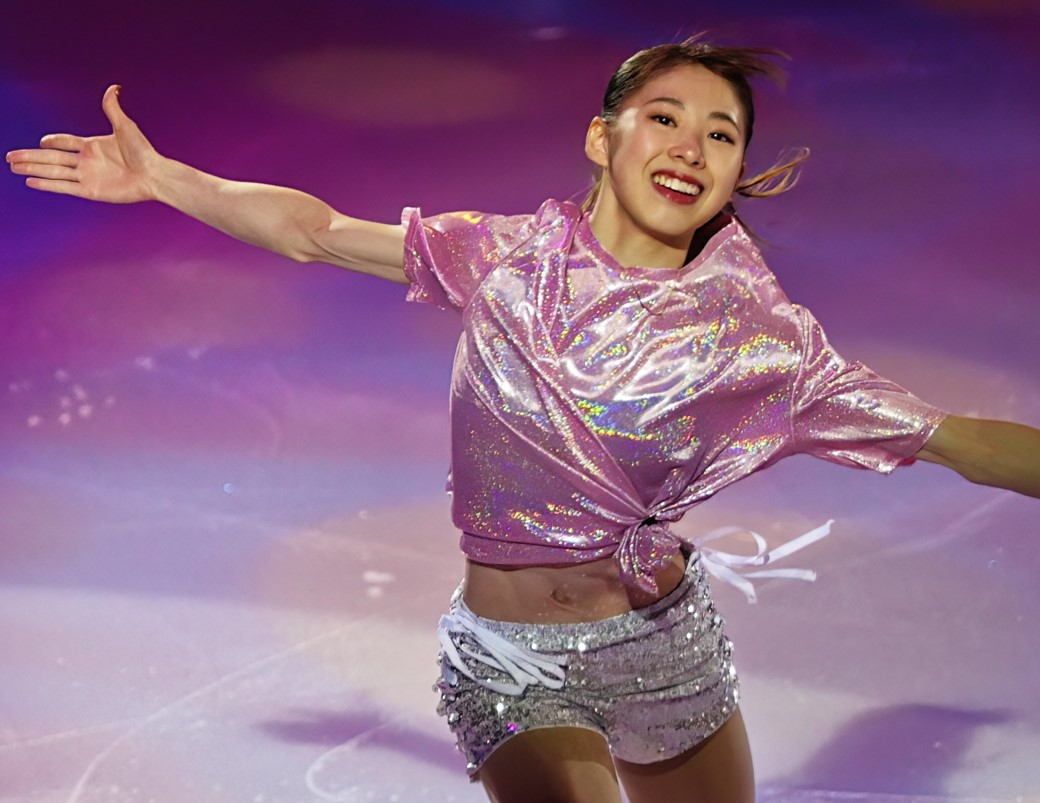
Sumiyoshi during the exhibition gala at the 2023 Grand Prix de France

Season	Short program	Free skating	Exhibition
2026–27	Anything Goes; Let's Face the Music and Dance performed by Tony Bennett & Lady Gaga choreo. by Massimo Scali	Awakening by Eternal Eclipse; Humility and Love (from Creation) by Christopher Young; Everlasting Light by Eternal Eclipse ft. Bianca Ban choreo. by Shae-Lynn Bourne	
2025–26	Alba Lullaby by Maksim Mrvica & Tonči Huljić choreo. by Misha Ge	Adiemus; Tininnalubumn; In Caelum Fero; Hymn; Adiemus; Rain Dance by Karl Jenkins & Mike Ratledge choreo. by Shae-Lynn Bourne	Bei Mir Bist Du Schön performed by Pete Jacobs & His Wartime Radio Revue
2024–25	Concerto pour la fin d'un amour (from Un homme qui me plaît) by Francis Lai performed by Antonio Pappano, Alexandre Tharaud, & Orchestra dell'Accademia Nazionale di Santa Cecilia choreo. by Misha Ge	Adiemus; Tininnalubumn; In Caelum Fero; Hymn; Adiemus; Rain Dance by Karl Jenkins & Mike Ratledge choreo. by Shae-Lynn Bourne	Mulan; Ancestors; Mulan & Honghyu Fight by Harry Gregson-Williams; Reflection (Epic Version) by Samuel Kim choreo. by Cathy Reed; Les Champs-Élysées by Joe Dassin performed by Zaz
2023–24	Blood in the Water by KSHMR choreo. by Misha Ge	Enchantress by Two Steps from Hell choreo. by Shae-Lynn Bourne	Better When I'm Dancin' by Meghan Trainor choreo. by Lisa Mochizuki
2022–23	White Flowers Take Their Bath by Mari Samuelsen, Meredi, Scoring Berlin, & Jonathan Stockhammer choreo. by Cathy Reed	Enchantress by Two Steps from Hell choreo. by Shae-Lynn Bourne	Better When I'm Dancin' by Meghan Trainor choreo. by Lisa Mochizuki
2021–22	Je Suis Malade by Alice Dona & Serge Lama performed by Lara Fabian choreo. by Noriko Sato	Mulan; Ancestors; Mulan & Honghyu Fight by Harry Gregson-Williams; Reflection (Epic Version) by Samuel Kim choreo. by Cathy Reed	The Rose by Amanda McBroom performed by Bette Midler choreo. by Kenji Miyamoto
2020–21	The Rose by Amanda McBroom performed by Bette Midler choreo. by Kenji Miyamoto	Les Demoiselles de Rochefort by Michel Legrand choreo. by Noriko Sato	
2019–20	The Rose by Amanda McBroom performed by Bette Midler choreo. by Kenji Miyamoto	Les Demoiselles de Rochefort by Michel Legrand choreo. by Noriko Sato	
2018–19	East Of Eden by Lee Holdridge choreo. by Eiji Iwamoto	Black Swan; Stumbled Beginnings...; Cruel Mistress; Perfection by Clint Mansell choreo. by Noriko Sato	
2017–18	El Choclo performed by Cello Project choreo. by Akiko Suzuki	Black Swan; Stumbled Beginnings...; Cruel Mistress; Perfection by Clint Mansell choreo. by Noriko Sato	Friend Like Me (from Aladdin) by Robin Williams
2016–17	American Patrol by F. W. Meacham		American Patrol by F. W. Meacham

== Competitive highlights ==
- GP – Event of the ISU Grand Prix Series
- JGP – Event of the ISU Junior Grand Prix Series
- CS – Event of the ISU Challenger Series
- TBD – Assigned
- WD – Withdrew from competition
- Medals at team events are awarded for the team results only. Individual placements at team events are listed in parentheses.

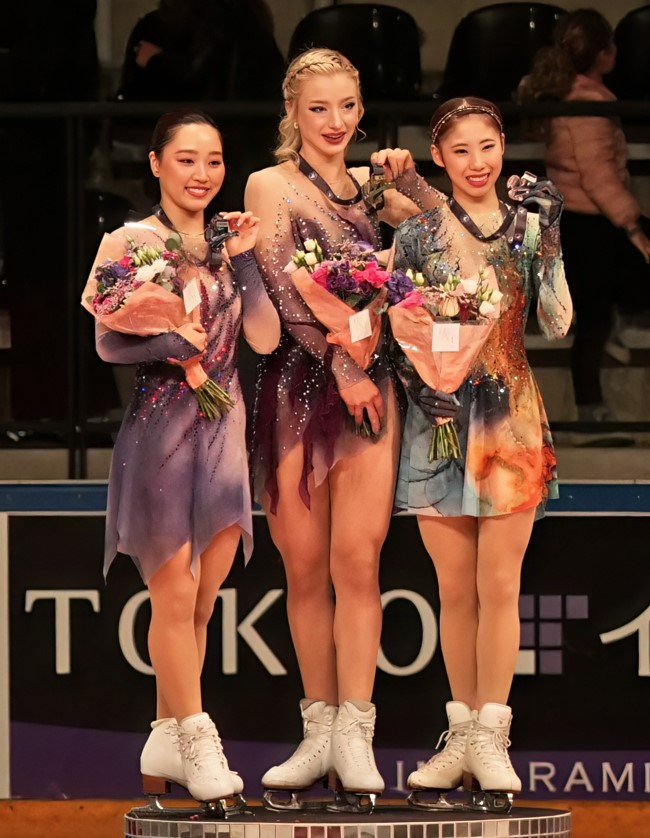
Sumiyoshi (right) at the 2024 Grand Prix de France alongside Amber Glenn (centre) and Wakaba Higuchi (left)

=== Senior level ===
Competition placements at senior level
Season	2020–21	2021–22	2022–23	2023–24	2024–25	2025–26	2026–27
Japan Championships	12th	8th	14th	10th	8th	18th	
GP Final				6th			
GP Cup of China					4th		
GP Finland				2nd		7th	7th
GP NHK Trophy			3rd				
GP France			3rd	3rd	3rd	3rd	6th
CS Lombardia Trophy						1st	
Asian Open Trophy							WD
Challenge Cup					2nd		
Coupe du Printemps		2nd					
Tallink Hotels Cup				1st			
Winter University Games			4th		1st		

=== Junior level ===
Competition placements at Junior level
Season	2016–17	2017–18	2018–19	2019–20	2020–21	2021–22
Junior Worlds						8th
Japan Junior	13th		9th		5th	2nd
JGP Canada			3rd			
JGP Latvia				8th		
JGP Slovenia			4th			
Asian Open			6th			

== Detailed results ==
ISU personal best scores in the +5/-5 GOE System
Segment	Type	Score	Event
Total	TSS	216.06	2025 Grand Prix de France
Short program	TSS	71.03	2025 Grand Prix de France
Short program	TES	38.89	2024 Cup of China
Short program	PCS	32.72	2025 Grand Prix de France
Free skating	TSS	145.03	2025 Grand Prix de France
Free skating	TES	77.13	2025 Grand Prix de France
Free skating	PCS	67.90	2025 Grand Prix de France

=== Senior level ===
Results in the 2024–25 season
Date	Event	SP		FS		Total	
Date	Event	P	Score	P	Score	P	Score
Nov 1–3, 2024	2024 Grand Prix de France	5	66.88	2	134.47	3	201.35
Nov 22–24, 2024	2024 Cup of China	3	70.48	4	131.97	4	202.45
Dec 19–22, 2024	2024–25 Japan Championships	7	69.58	11	127.95	8	197.53
Jan 16–18, 2025	(Italy) 2025 Winter World University Games	3	65.89	1	138.40	1	204.29
Feb 13–16, 2025	(Netherlands) 2025 Challenge Cup	2	69.96	2	201.60	2	201.60

Results in the 2025–26 season
Date	Event	SP		FS		Total	
Date	Event	P	Score	P	Score	P	Score
Sep 11–14, 2025	(Italy) 2025 CS Lombardia Trophy	3	68.87	1	140.72	1	209.59
Oct 17–19, 2025	2025 Grand Prix de France	4	71.03	3	145.03	3	216.06
Nov 21–23, 2025	(Finland) 2025 Finlandia Trophy	5	61.42	7	116.48	7	178.26
Dec 18–21, 2025	2025–26 Japan Championships	21	56.37	18	116.82	18	173.19

Results in the 2026-27 season
Date	Event	SP		FS		Total	
Date	Event	P	Score	P	Score	P	Score
Oct 23–25, 2026	2026 Grand Prix de France	8	61.10	4	129.60	6	190.70
Nov 20–22, 2026	(Finland) 2026 Finlandia Trophy	8	64.06	8	115.81	7	179.87

2023–2024 season
Date	Event	SP	FS	Total
February 15–18, 2024	2024 Tallink Hotels Cup	2; 66.53	2; 122.68	1; 189.21
December 20–24, 2023	2023–24 Japan Championships	17; 56.70	9; 128.52	10; 185.22
December 7–10, 2023	2023–24 Grand Prix Final	5; 58.63	6; 121.76	6; 180.39
November 17–19, 2023	2023 Grand Prix of Espoo	2; 68.65	3; 121.56	2; 190.21
November 3–5, 2023	2023 Grand Prix de France	5; 61.72	1; 136.04	3; 197.76
2022–23 season
Date	Event	SP	FS	Total
January 13–15, 2023	2023 Winter World University Games	4; 72.58	5; 118.90	4; 191.48
December 21–25, 2022	2022–23 Japan Championships	17; 57.38	14; 120.65	14; 178.03
November 17–20, 2022	2022 NHK Trophy	3; 68.01	4; 125.11	3; 193.12
November 4–6, 2022	2022 Grand Prix de France	5; 64.10	3; 130.24	3; 194.34
2021–22 season
Date	Event	SP	FS	Total
March 18–20, 2022	2022 Coupe du Printemps	2; 61.47	2; 116.55	2; 178.02
December 22–26, 2021	2021–22 Japan Championships	7; 67.39	11; 121.77	8; 189.16
2020–21 season
Date	Event	SP	FS	Total
December 24–27, 2020	2020–21 Japan Championships	11; 62.62	10; 123.46	12; 186.08

=== Junior level ===
2021–22 season
Date	Event	SP	FS	Total
April 13–17, 2022	2022 World Junior Championships	9; 60.62	8; 113.96	8; 174.58
November 19–21, 2021	2021–22 Japan Junior Championships	1; 65.34	3; 114.91	2; 180.25
2020–21 season
Date	Event	SP	FS	Total
November 21–23, 2020	2020–21 Japan Junior Championships	3; 59.96	5; 110.41	5; 170.37
2019–20 season
Date	Event	SP	FS	Total
September 4–7, 2019	2019 JGP Latvia	8; 56.74	8; 104.32	8; 161.06
2018–19 season
Date	Event	SP	FS	Total
November 23–25, 2018	2018–19 Japan Junior Championships	10; 52.81	8; 97.57	9; 150.38
October 3–6, 2018	2018 JGP Slovenia	5; 59.80	4; 111.85	4; 171.65
September 12–15, 2018	2018 JGP Canada	7; 55.07	3; 119.89	3; 174.96
August 1–5, 2018	2018 Asian Open Trophy	6; 50.61	6; 95.35	6; 145.96
2016–17 season
Date	Event	SP	FS	Total
November 18–20, 2016	2016–17 Japan Junior Championships	11; 52.13	13; 95.51	13; 147.64
