= Ami Nakai =

Japanese figure skater (born 2008)

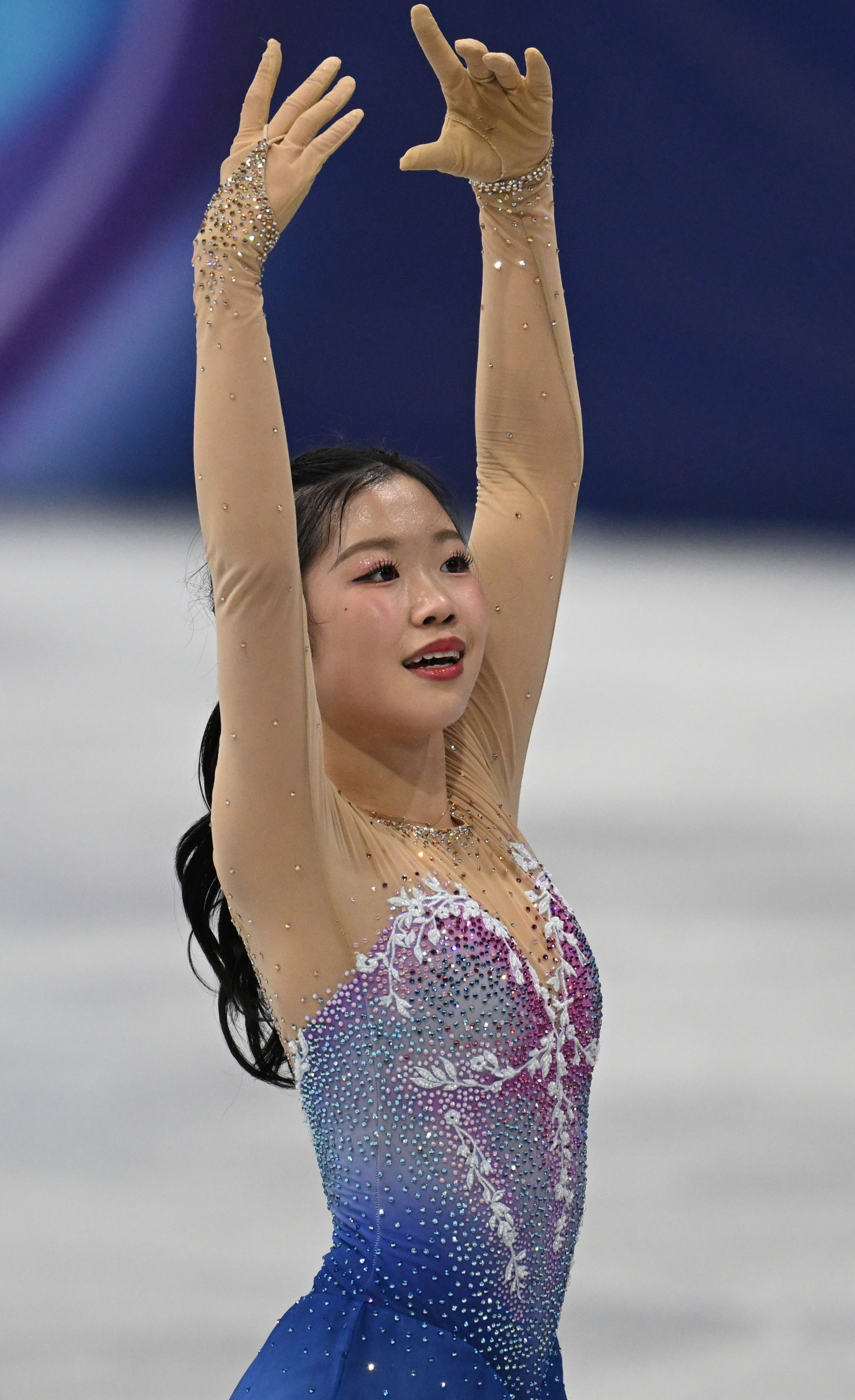
- Nakai during her free skate at the 2026 Winter Olympics

Personal information
- Native name: 中井 亜美
- Born: April 27, 2008 (age 18) Niigata, Niigata, Japan
- Home town: Funabashi, Chiba, Japan
- Height: 1.50 m (4 ft 11 in)

Figure skating career
- Country: Japan
- Coach: Kensuke Nakaniwa; Makoto Nakata; Momoe Nagumo; Aya Tanoue; Niina Takeno
- Skating club: Tokio Inkarami
- Began skating: 2013

Medal record
Olympic Games
Bronze medal – third place	2026 Milano Cortina	Singles
Four Continents Championships
Silver medal – second place	2026 Beijing	Singles
Grand Prix Final
Silver medal – second place	2025–26 Nagoya	Singles
World Junior Championships
Bronze medal – third place	2023 Calgary	Singles
Junior Grand Prix Final
Bronze medal – third place	2024–25 Grenoble	Singles

Ami Nakai (中井 亜美, Nakai Ami; born April 27, 2008) is a Japanese figure skater. She is the 2026 Olympic bronze medalist, 2026 Four Continents silver medalist, 2025–26 Grand Prix Final silver medalist, two time Grand Prix de France (2025, 2026) champion, 2026 Skate America champion, and 2025 Skate Canada International bronze medalist.

On the junior level, she is the 2023 World Junior bronze medalist, the 2024–25 Junior Grand Prix Final bronze medalist, a six-time medalist on the ISU Junior Grand Prix (four gold, one silver, one bronze), and the 2022–23 Japanese junior bronze medalist.

She is also the sixth woman to land a triple Axel at a Winter Olympic Games.

== Personal life ==
Nakai was born on April 27, 2008 in Niigata, Niigata Prefecture, Japan. She graduated from Meike Elementary School and moved to Chiba Prefecture in 2021. She attended Ichikawa Municipal Minami-Gyotoku Junior High School, located in Ichikawa, Chiba, from which she graduated in 2024. She is currently a student at Yushi International High School.

== Career ==
=== Early career ===
Nakai began figure skating in 2013. She originally practiced rhythmic gymnastics but ultimately switched to figure skating after being inspired by watching Mao Asada perform on TV when she was five years old. Nakai originally trained at the Ibis SC in Niigata under coaches, Kousuke Watabe and Izumi Watabe. While there, Nakai got to meet Asada when she used Nakai's training rink to practice for an ice show in Niigata. Asada also gave Nakai a private skating lesson. Nakai started practicing and landing triple Axels in her fifth year of elementary school.

On the basic novice level, Nakai finished fourteenth at the 2017–18 Japan Novice Championships and would go on to win gold at the 2018–19 Japan Novice Championships. Due to the latter result, Nakai was invited to skate in the gala at the 2019 World Team Trophy.

As an advanced novice skater, Nakai finished fifth at the 2019–20 Japan Novice Championships. The following year, she won bronze at the 2020–21 Japan Novice Championships and with this result, was invited to compete at the 2020–21 Japan Junior Championships where she placed sixth.

In spring 2021, Nakai moved with her mother from her hometown of Niigata, Niigata Prefecture to Funabashi, Chiba Prefecture so that Nakai could train at the MF Figure Skating Academy, while her father remained in Niigata due to his work. Kensuke Nakaniwa, Makoto Nakata, Momoe Nagumo, Aya Tanoue, and Akane Seo became Nakai's new coaching team.

=== 2021–22 season: Junior international debut ===
Nakai placed seventh at the 2021–22 Japan Junior National Championships but was invited to compete at the 2021–22 Japan Senior National Championships because the junior champion Mao Shimada was still a novice skater. She popped her planned triple Axel in the short program and struggled on the landing of the triple Lutz, finishing in twenty-seventh and not advancing to the final.

Nakai was sent to 2022 Coupe du Printemps to compete at the junior category. She won and became the twentieth woman to land a triple Axel in international competition.

=== 2022–23 season: World Junior bronze ===
In September 2022, Nakai debuted on the Junior Grand Prix circuit at the 2022 JGP Latvia in Riga. She landed all her jumps cleanly in her short program and placed third with 63.87 points. Nakai attempted a triple Axel but was marked as under-rotated during the free skate. She popped two jumps and finished third overall. At the second of two Polish Junior Grand Prixes held in Gdańsk, she won the gold medal and qualified to the 2022–23 Junior Grand Prix Final. Nakai landed a clean triple Axel in the free skate and said afterward that she hoped to do two in the free skate at the Final.

Fourth in the short program at the 2022–23 Japan Junior Championships, Nakai landed a triple Axel in the free skate and made only one jumping error, a fall on her triple loop. She placed third in that segment, moving up to take the bronze medal.Two weeks later, at the Junior Grand Prix Final, Nakai finished in fourth place, 1.16 points behind bronze medalist Kim Chae-yeon of South Korea. Despite narrowly missing the podium, she described the Final as "a dream stage."

Nakai appeared at her second senior Japan Championships, finishing eighth in the short program. She finished fourth in the free skate, successfully landing two triple Axel jumps, and rising to fourth place overall. She said she was "happy to have challenged two Axels on this big stage, and landed them both! It's the first time I have been able to land both in the same program." Nakai was assigned to Japan's second berth at the 2023 World Junior Championships, alongside Shimada.

Competing at the World Junior Championships in Calgary, Nakai was third in the short program with a clean skate. With a score of 67.28, she finished 3.96 points back of second-place Shin Ji-a of South Korea, and 3.31 points ahead of Kim Yu-jae in fourth. Nakai fell on her triple Axel attempt at the beginning of the free skate, but delivered the rest of the program cleanly, finishing third in that segment as well and winning the bronze medal.

=== 2023–24 season ===
Nakai began the season by competing on the Junior Grand Prix at the 2023 JGP Thailand, skating a clean short program to lead the segment. In the free skate she doubled her planned triple Axel and as a result performed too many double Axels in the segment, in violation of the Zayak rule, but still finished first in that segment as well and won the gold medal. She secured another gold medal at the 2023 JGP Turkey in Istanbul, despite struggling with jump combinations in the free skate, which she said left her "a little bit disappointed," but adding she was "happy to be in first place." Her results qualified her for her second Junior Grand Prix Final.

Dealing with a back injury with painkiller and injections, Nakai withdrew from the domestic sectionals competition in early November. Despite this, she was considered a podium contender heading into the 2023–24 Japan Junior Championships. After falling and failing to executive a jump combination in the short program, she finished fourteenth in that segment. She was tenth in the free skate, and rose to tenth overall, as a result missing qualification for both the senior national championships and the Japanese team for the 2024 Winter Youth Olympics.

Nakai next appeared at the Junior Grand Prix Final in Beijing, placing fourth in the short program. In the free skate she fell on her triple Axel, but landed six other triple jumps. She was fifth in that segment, and came fifth overall. Nakai explained that she "thought it would be the last competition of the season, so a part of me was nervous."

=== 2024–25 season: JGP Final bronze ===
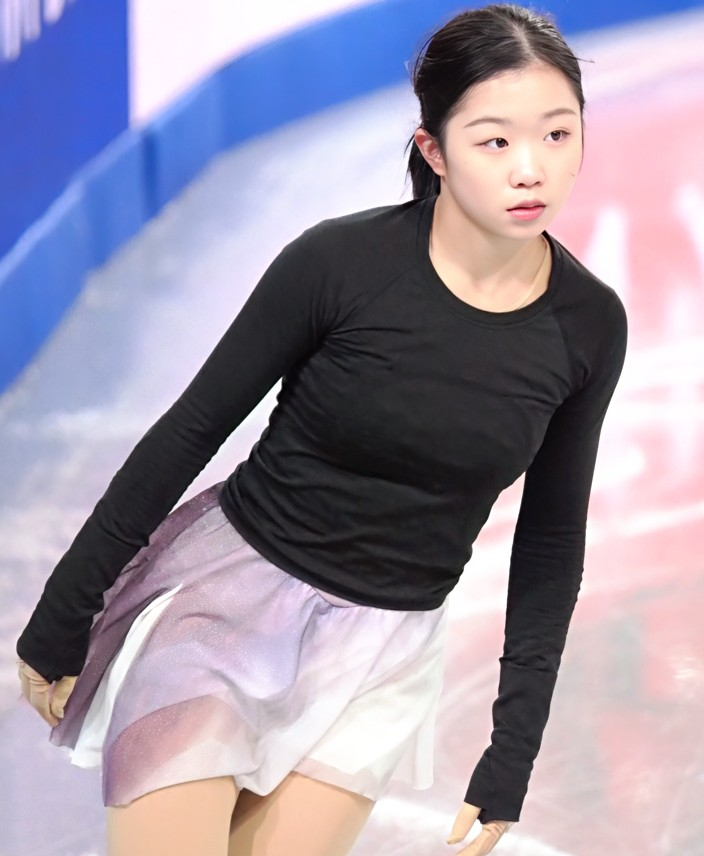
Nakai during practice at the 2024–25 Junior Grand Prix Final

Over the course of the off-season, Nakai grew over five centimeters in height. She traveled to Toronto, Canada for a training camp at the Toronto Cricket, Skating and Curling Club during the summer. While there, Nakai worked with coaches, Brian Orser, Karen Preston, and Jeff Dionisio. She also began practicing and landing quadruple toe loops for the first time.

Nakai opened the season by competing on the 2024–25 ISU Junior Grand Prix, winning silver at 2024 JGP Turkey. At the 2024 JGP China, she won the gold medal, notably landing two triple Axels in her free skate although they were deemed as slightly underrotated. With these results, Nakai qualified for the Junior Grand Prix Final for a third consecutive time.

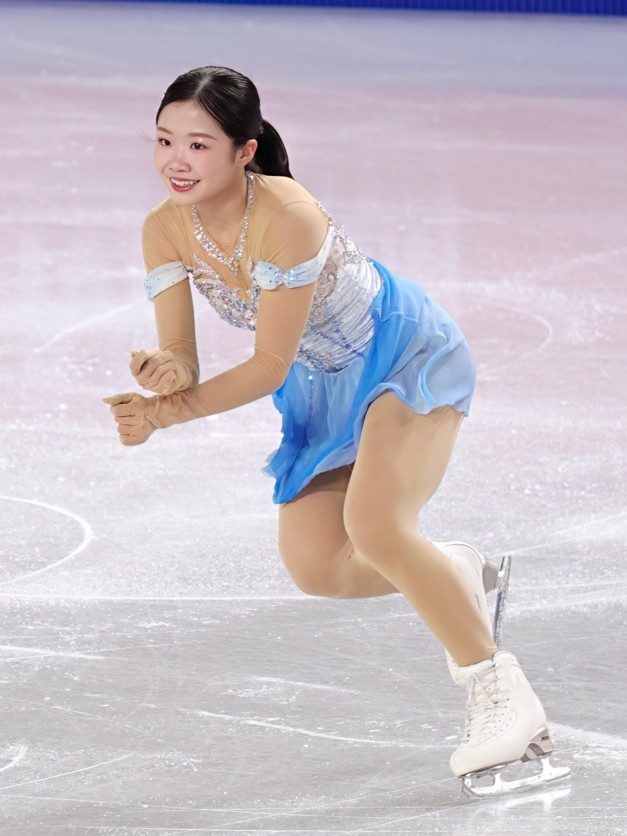
Nakai during her free skate 2024–25 Junior Grand Prix Final

In late November, Nakai competed at the 2024–25 Japan Junior Championships, where she finished fourth. Weeks later, Nakai competed at the Junior Grand Prix Final in Grenoble, France. She placed third in the short program, and fourth in the free skate, taking and third overall, winning her first JGP Final medal, and rounding out a Japanese sweep in the junior women's event alongside Kaoruko Wada and Mao Shimada. Following the event, she said, "This is my first medal at the JGP final and I am very, very happy to have achieved that also together with my teammates." Two weeks later, Nakai competed at the 2024–25 Japan Championships, where she finished fifteenth. She was subsequently named to the World Junior team.

Nakai placed third in the short program at the 2025 World Junior Championships in Debrecen, winning a bronze small medal, despite a "shaky" double Axel landing. She struggled in the free skate, including errors on both triple Axel attempts, as a result coming sixth in that segment and dropping to fourth overall. She finished 2.82 points behind American bronze medalist Elyce Lin-Gracey. "I wanted to challenge the Axel, and because I was able to take it seriously, I feel like my opportunities to attempt it might slightly decrease in the future,” Nakai said after the free skate. “But rather than focusing only on results, I think for seniors, the process is more important. So, while I’m still a junior and I want to gain as many experiences as possible."

=== 2025–26 season: Senior debut and Olympic bronze medal ===
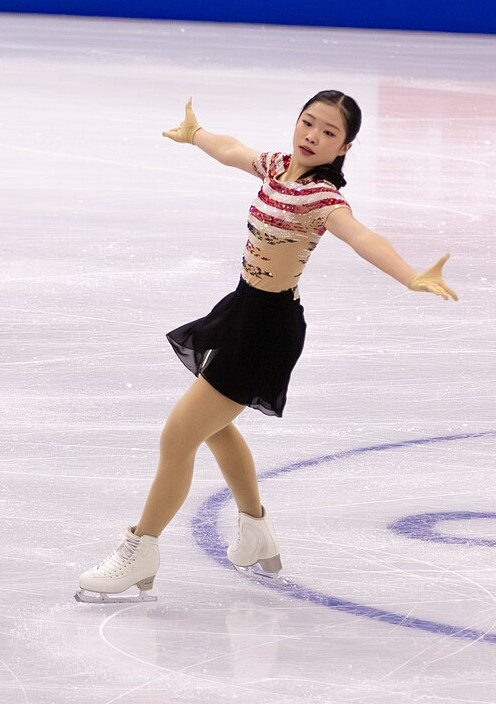
Nakai performing her short program at 2025 Skate Canada International

In early July, Nakai shared that although she had originally intended to keep her Cinderella for the upcoming season, copyright issues involving The Walt Disney Company meant that she would have to create a new free program from scratch. In doing so, she worked with local choreographer, Kenji Miyamoto.

In mid-August, Nakai sustained a back injury during training. The following month, she made her senior international debut at the 2025 CS Lombardia Trophy, winning the silver medal behind teammate, Rion Sumiyoshi.

Making her 2025–26 Grand Prix circuit, Nakai won the gold medal at the 2025 Grand Prix de France, earning new personal best scores in the short program, free skate and total score and defeating three-time World champion Kaori Sakamoto. "I never expected to win," said Nakai following the event. "I'm extremely happy, but I don't want this to create any strange pressure for me going into my next event." Two weeks later, Nakai took the bronze medal at the 2025 Skate Canada International. Both results qualified her for a spot at the 2025–26 Grand Prix of Figure Skating Final.

Nakai placed second overall at the 2025–26 Grand Prix Final in her debut at this event. She stepped out of the triple Axel in the short program, but it was clean in the free skate. "In the beginning of the season, I really wasn't thinking at all about the Olympics, but now that this international competition is behind me, I'm actually starting to feel that the Olympic stage is getting to be close around the corner," she said. Two weeks later, Nakai finished fourth at the 2025–26 Japan Championships. She was subsequently named to the 2026 Winter Olympic team. The following month, Nakai won the silver medal at the 2026 Four Continents Championships in her debut at this event. "I was disappointed that I fell on the triple Axel," said Nakai, "but I managed to finish my program pretty well. Throughout the season, I carried momentum and I was able to perform on this condition. That's something I was excited about. And I'm very excited that I was able to get a medal at my first Four Continents Championships."

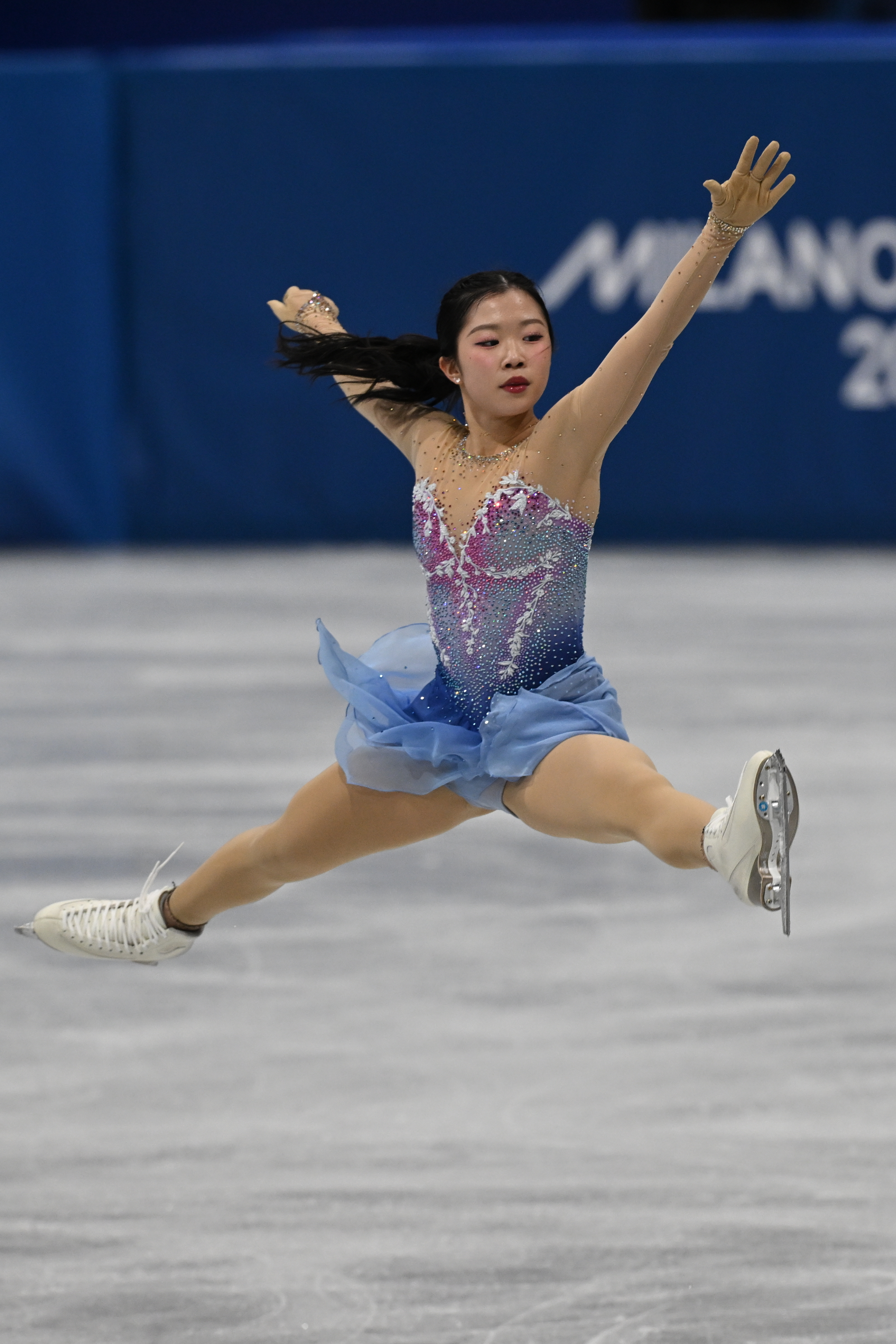
Nakai performing a split jump in her free skate at the 2026 Winter Olympics

On 17 February, Nakai competed in the short program of the 2026 Winter Olympics, as the event's youngest competitor. She won that segment and earned a personal best after delivering a clean skate that included a triple Axel. In doing so, she became the sixth women's singles skater to land a triple Axel at a Winter Olympic Games. "Honestly, I'm surprised, and I'm very happy now that I was able to perform like this on this stage," she said following her performance. "I didn't feel scared at all, and I wasn't as nervous as I expected. I was really excited about it. I was the first to skate, so I was able to carry this feeling from the six-minute warm-up into properly challenging this performance. I think that really helped."

Two days later, Nakai competed in the free skate segment. Although she opened with a clean triple Axel, she doubled the second part of her planned triple-triple combination, and two of her other triples were deemed to have been landed on the quarter. Due to many of the women delivering very strong free programs that night, Nakai only placed ninth in that segment despite receiving a high score of 140.45. However due to her first-place finish in the short program, Nakai managed to win the bronze medal overall.

"When the scores came out, I couldn't tell where my ranking was," she said in an interview after her free skate. "I was searching for it. I thought I didn't make it. When I looked next to my name, it had 3 next to it. That's when I finally realized it meant a bronze medal. I was really surprised, and honestly, I even wondered if it was real... I had never seen my coach cry before, so seeing him genuinely happy and celebrating with a medal like this made me really happy. My coach told me 'thank you.' Even before the short program, he had said, 'Thank you for bringing me to this stage.' So being able to win this medal together like this makes me really happy... I honestly didn't even think I would be able to compete at the Olympics. The fact that I'm now standing here, wearing a medal, makes me incredibly happy. It makes me feel that all the injuries and everything I went through along the way were not in vain."

Nakai's tearful, excited reaction to winning the Olympic bronze medal went viral online, which included gold medalist, Alysa Liu, rushing over to Nakai and joyfully embracing her and hoisting Nakai up off the ground.

In March, Nakai made her World senior debut at the 2026 World Championships in Prague, Czech Republic. She finished in ninth place overall after placing eighth in both the short program and the free skate. "It was a really long season," she said. "Mentally it was really tough as well, but now that it's over. I really feel like I've worked hard through it."

=== 2026–27 season ===
Nakai opened her season at the 2026 Kinoshita Group Cup. She placed first place in the short program, breaking the 80-point barrier for the first time in her career. She dropped to fourth overall after placing fourth in the free skating segment.

Going onto compete on the Grand Prix circuit, Nakai competed at the opening event of the series, 2026 Grand Prix de France. As the defending champion of the event she placed third in the short program after popping her planned triple Axel into a single Axel which invalidated the element. On the day of the free skate, due to demonstrations in Angers the skaters were unable to return to hotel after the morning practice, hence needing to stay at the rink for nearly twelve hours. Nakai later revealed that the situation had caused her considerable anxiety. "It was my first time experiencing a situation like this, with demonstrations preventing us from returning to the hotel. It made me very anxious, on top of the usual nerves before a competition.” Nevertheless, she delivered a clean free skate, placing first in the segment and winning the event for a second consecutive year. Following the event the event she revealed that it was the first time she was focused on winning and it created a lot of pressure.

Three weeks later, Nakai competed at 2026 Skate America, taking the title after placing first in both the short program and free skate, earning personal bests in both segments and winning with a combined personal best score of 236.81. “Today I went into the performance with a lot of confidence,” she said after the free skate. “I'm really happy that everything became reality that I had hoped for as well as with the results that came with it.” Both these results were enough for her to qualify for 2026-27 Grand Prix Final for a second consecutive year.

== Honors and awards ==
- ISU Skating Awards 2026: Best Newcomer

== Programs ==
Season	Short program	Free skating	Exhibition
2026–2027	"Por una cabeza" by Carlos Gardel performed by John Williams, Itzhak Perlman, & Sumi Jo choreo. by Shin Yea-ji	An American in Paris; Shall We Dance?; Second Rhapsody / Cuban Overture by George Gershwin performed by An American in Paris Orchestra & Todd Ellison choreo. by David Wilson	Dear Future Husband by Meghan Trainor
2025–2026	La Strada by Nino Rota choreo. by David Wilson	"What a Wonderful World" by Louis Armstrong performed by Lexi Walker & The Piano Guys choreo. by Kenji Miyamoto	"I Got Rhythm" by George Gershwin performed by Fazıl Say choreo. by Akiko Suzuki; "Don't You Worry 'bout a Thing" (from Sing) performed by Tori Kelly
2024–2025	Les Parapluies de Cherbourg by Michel Legrand performed by Danielle Licari choreo. by Kenji Miyamoto	Cinderella; Who Is She; Courage and Kindness; La Valse Champagne by Patrick Doyle choreo. by David Wilson	"Don't You Worry 'bout a Thing" (from Sing) performed by Tori Kelly; "I Got Rhythm" by George Gershwin performed by Fazıl Say choreo. by Akiko Suzuki
2023–2024	"Baby, God Bless You" by Shinya Kiyozuka choreo. by Akiko Suzuki	"Glimmer of Faith" by Karl Hugo; "Only Hope" (from A Walk to Remember) performed by Mandy Moore & Jon Foreman choreo. by David Wilson	
2022–2023	"I Got Rhythm" by George Gershwin performed by Fazıl Say choreo. by Akiko Suzuki	Miss Saigon Rhapsody by Claude-Michel Schönberg performed by Japan Philharmonic Orchestra choreo. by Kenji Miyamoto	"O Holy Night" by John Sullivan Dwight performed by Jackie Evancho choreo. by Kenji Miyamoto
2021–2022	"O Holy Night" by John Sullivan Dwight performed by Jackie Evancho choreo. by Kenji Miyamoto	"To Believe" by Jackie Evancho choreo. by Kenji Miyamoto	
2020–2021		"To Believe" by Jackie Evancho choreo. by Kenji Miyamoto	
2018–2019			Cinderella by Al Hoffman, Mack David, Jerry Livingston, Patrick Doyle performed by Mitsuki Takahata, Yu Shirota

== Competitive highlights ==
- GP – Event of the ISU Grand Prix Series
- JGP – Event of the ISU Junior Grand Prix Series
- CS – Event of the ISU Challenger Series
- TBD – Assigned
- WD – Withdrew from competition

Competition placements at senior level
Season	2021–22	2022–23	2024–25	2025–26	2026–27
Winter Olympics				3rd	
World Championships				9th	
Four Continents Championships				2nd	
Japan Championships	27th	4th	15th	4th	
Grand Prix Final				2nd	TBD
GP France				1st	1st
GP Skate America					1st
GP Skate Canada				3rd	
CS Lombardia Trophy				2nd	
CS Kinoshita Group Cup					4th

Competition placements at junior level
Season	2020–21	2021–22	2022–23	2023–24	2024–25
World Junior Championships			3rd		4th
Junior Grand Prix Final			4th	5th	3rd
Japan Championships	6th	7th	3rd	10th	4th
JGP China					1st
JGP Latvia			3rd		
JGP Poland			1st		
JGP Thailand				1st	
JGP Turkey				1st	2nd
Coupe du Printemps		1st	1st		

== Detailed results ==
ISU personal best scores in the +5/-5 GOE System
Segment	Type	Score	Event
Total	**TSS**	**236.81**	2026 Skate America
Short program	**TSS**	**82.20**	2026 Skate America
Short program	TES	48.25	2026 Skate America
Short program	PCS	33.95	2026 Skate America
Free skating	**TSS**	**154.61**	2026 Skate America
Free skating	TES	82.71	2026 Skate America
Free skating	PCS	71.90	2026 Skate America

Current personal best scores are highlighted in bold. Small medals for short and free programs awarded only at ISU Championships.

=== Senior level ===
Results in the 2021–22 season
Date	Event	SP		FS		Total	
Date	Event	P	Score	P	Score	P	Score
Dec 22–26, 2021	2021–22 Japan Championships	27	52.65	-	-	27	52.65

Results in the 2022–23 season
Date	Event	SP		FS		Total	
Date	Event	P	Score	P	Score	P	Score
Dec 21–25, 2022	2022–23 Japan Championships	8	64.07	4	137.42	4	201.49

Results in the 2024–25 season
Date	Event	SP		FS		Total	
Date	Event	P	Score	P	Score	P	Score
Dec 19–22, 2024	2024–25 Japan Championships	21	55.20	12	127.30	15	182.50

Results in the 2025–26 season
Date	Event	SP		FS		Total	
Date	Event	P	Score	P	Score	P	Score
Sep 11–14, 2025	(Italy) 2025 CS Lombardia Trophy	5	68.30	2	137.74	2	206.04
Oct 17–19, 2025	2025 Grand Prix de France	1	78.00	1	**149.08**	1	**227.08**
Oct 31-Nov 2, 2025	2025 Skate Canada International	4	66.55	3	136.54	3	203.09
Dec 4–7, 2025	(Japan) 2025–26 Grand Prix Final	3	73.91	2	146.98	2	220.89
Dec 18–21, 2025	2025–26 Japan Championships	3	77.50	7	136.06	4	213.56
Jan 21–25, 2026	(China) . Four Continents Championships	1	73.83	2	141.95	2	215.78
Feb 17–19, 2026	(Italy) 2026 Winter Olympics	1	**78.71**	9	140.45	3	219.16
Mar 24–29, 2026	(Czech Republic) 2026 World Championships	8	69.10	8	130.90	9	200.00

Results in the 2026–27 season
Date	Event	SP		FS		Total	
Date	Event	P	Score	P	Score	P	Score
Sept 4–6, 2026	(Japan) 2026 Kinoshita Group Cup	1	80.27	4	127.45	4	207.72
Oct 23-25, 2026	2026 Grand Prix de France	3	70.66	1	149.08	1	219.74
Nov 13-15, 2026	(United States) 2026 Skate America	1	82.20	1	154.61	1	236.81

=== Junior level ===
2024–25 season
Date	Event	SP	FS	Total
February 25–March 2, 2025	2025 World Junior Championships	3; 66.84	6; 119.05	4; 185.89
December 5–8, 2024	2024–25 JGP Final	3; 67.26	4; 122.32	3; 189.58
November 15–17, 2024	2024–25 Japan Junior Championships	5; 62.52	8; 118.31	4; 180.83
October 9–12, 2024	2024 JGP China	1; 68.66	1; 136.22	1; 204.88
September 18–21, 2024	2024 JGP Turkey	1; 66.22	2; 125.39	2; 191.61
2023–24 season
Date	Event	SP	FS	Total
December 7–10, 2023	2023–24 JGP Final	4; 65.04	5; 122.00	5; 187.04
November 17–19, 2023	2023–24 Japan Junior Championships	14; 55.06	10; 105.83	10; 160.89
September 6–9, 2023	2023 JGP Turkey	1; 67.07	1; 127.58	1; 194.65
August 23–26, 2023	2023 JGP Thailand	1; 67.49	2; 123.16	1; 190.65
2022–23 season
Date	Event	SP	FS	Total
March 17–19, 2023	2023 Coupe du Printemps	1; 64.42	1; 133.81	1; 198.23
February 27–March 5, 2023	2023 World Junior Championships	3; 67.28	3; 130.12	3; 197.40
December 8–11, 2022	2022–23 JGP Final	4; 65.97	4; 123.26	4; 189.23
November 25–27, 2022	2022–23 Japan Junior Championships	4; 65.12	3; 125.58	3; 190.70
October 5–8, 2022	2022 JGP Poland II	1; **69.00**	1; **136.90**	1; **205.90**
September 7–10, 2022	2022 JGP Riga	3; 63.87	3; 121.75	3; 185.62
2021–22 season
Date	Event	SP	FS	Total
March 18–20, 2022	2022 Coupe du Printemps	2; 55.73	1; 126.68	1; 182.41
November 19–21, 2021	2021–22 Japan Junior Championships	7; 56.78	6; 108.98	7; 165.76
