= Lucas Tsuyoshi Honda =

Japanese figure skater (born 2002)

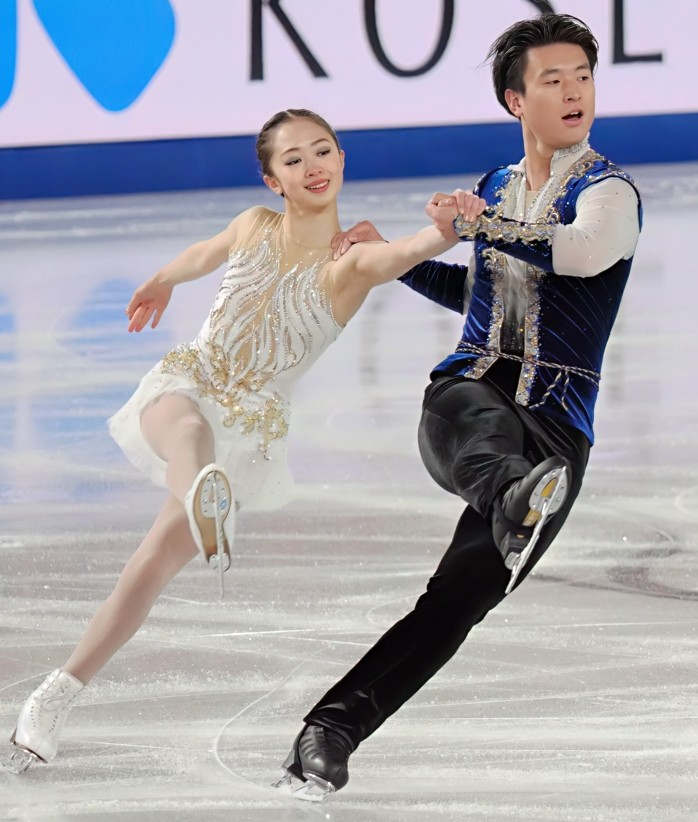
- Sae Shimizu and Lucas Tsuyoshi Honda performing their short program at the 2024–25 Junior Grand Prix Final

Personal information
- Native name: 本田 ルーカス剛史
- Born: September 15, 2002 (age 24) Osaka, Japan
- Home town: Uji, Kyoto
- Height: 1.72 m (5 ft 7 1/2 in)

Figure skating career
- Country: Japan
- Discipline: Pair skating (since 2023); Men's singles (2016–24)
- Partner: Ayumi Kagotani (since 2025); Sae Shimizu (2023–25)
- Coach: Mie Hamada; Cathy Reed; Hiroaki Sato; Satsuki Muramoto
- Skating club: Kinoshita Academy
- Began skating: 2011
Japan Championships
Silver medal – second place	2025–26 Tokyo	Pairs
Bronze medal – third place	2024–25 Osaka	Pairs

Lucas Tsuyoshi Honda (本田 ルーカス剛史, Honda Lucas Tsuyoshi; born September 15, 2002) is a Japanese figure skater, who currently competes in the pairs discipline with Ayumi Kagotani.

With former partner, Sae Shimizu, they are the 2024–25 Japan national bronze medalists, two-time Japan Junior national champions (2023, 2024), and the 2024 JGP Turkey bronze medalists.

As a singles skater, he is the 2021 CS Cup of Austria silver medalist, the 2020 NHK Trophy bronze medalist, and the 2020–21 Japan junior national champion.

== Personal life ==
Honda was born on September 15, 2002, in Osaka, Japan. He is a fourth generation Japanese Brazilian. In addition, Honda speaks English proficiently.

He was a student at Ayaha High School before enrolling at Doshisha University in 2021, where he currently studies in the Faculty of Sports and Health Science.

His figure skating idol is Takahiko Kozuka.

== Career ==
=== Early career ===
Honda began figure skating in 2011. His first encounter with skating was in kindergarten. It wasn't until the second grade of elementary school, where he entered a class taught by coach Tsuyako Yamashita and began skating in earnest. He was then coached by Kotoe Nagasawa.

On the basic novice level, Honda finished thirteenth and fourth at the 2012–13 and 2013–14 Japan Basic Novice Championships, respectively. Going on to compete as an advanced novice level skater, Honda placed fifth at the 2014–15 Japan Advanced Novice Championships and ninth at the 2015–16 Japan Novice Championships.

As a junior skater, Honda competed at the 2016–17, 2017–18, and 2018–19 Japan Junior Championships, placing seventeenth, sixteenth, and ninth, respectively.

==== 2019–20 season ====
Honda started the season by winning the bronze medal at the 2019–20 Japan Junior Championships before going on to compete at the 2019–20 Japan Championships, finishing eleventh.

Following the season, Honda moved from Osaka to Uji, Kyoto to train at the Kinoshita Academy under coaches, Mie Hamada, Yamato Tamura, Hiroaki Sato, and Satsuki Muramoto.

==== 2020–21 season ====
Due to the COVID-19 pandemic, a large number of modifications were made to the Grand Prix structure. The competitors consisted only of skaters from the home country, skaters already training in the host nation, and skaters assigned to that event for geographic reason. As a result, Honda was selected compete at the 2020 NHK Trophy, where he won the bronze medal.

He then went on to win the gold medal at the 2020–21 Japan Junior Championships and place thirteenth at the 2020–21 Japan Championships.

==== 2021–22 season ====
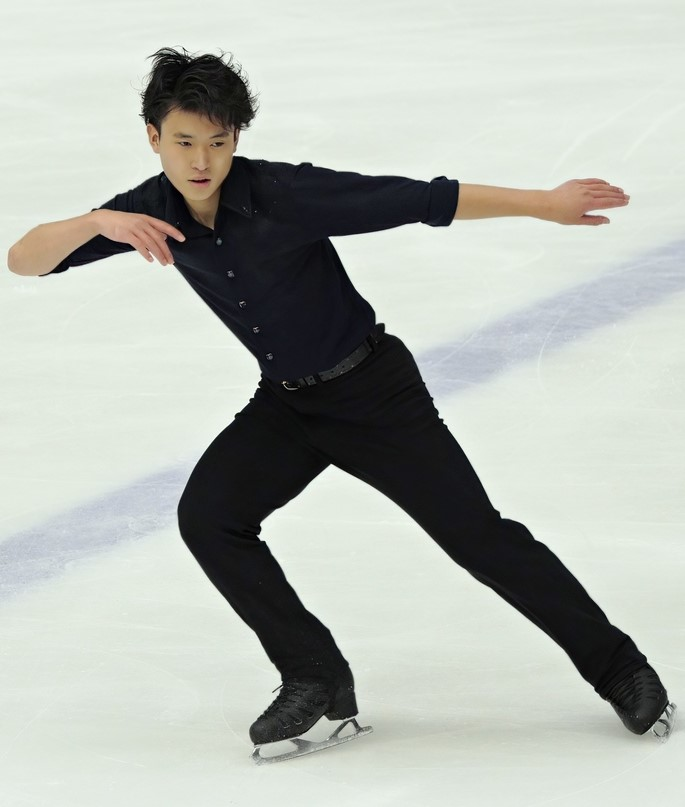
Honda at the 2021 CS Cup of Austria

Honda started the season by competing at the 2021 CS Cup of Austria, where he won the silver medal.

Despite the Japan Skating Federation not allowing Japanese figure skaters to compete on the Junior Grand Prix series due to the COVID-19 pandemic. Honda was nevertheless selected as a "wildcard" entry to compete at the 2021–22 Junior Grand Prix Final set to be held in Osaka, Japan. However, the Final ultimately ended up being cancelled due to the ongoing pandemic.

At the 2021–22 Japan Championships, Honda finished twelfth and was selected to compete at the 2022 World Junior Championships, where he ultimately came in fourteenth.

==== 2022–23 season ====
Competing on the Grand Prix series, Honda finished eleventh at the 2022 Grand Prix of Espoo. He went on to compete at the 2022–23 Japan Championships, finishing twenty-first.

=== Pair skating with Shimizu ===
==== 2023–24 season ====
In early 2023, Honda decided to give try pair skating at the insistence of his mother. It was later announced in May that Honda had teamed up with fellow Kinoshita Academy singles skater, Sae Shimizu, and that the pair would continue training under their singles skating coach, Mie Hamada, while also making trips to Oakville, Ontario, Canada to work with Bruno Marcotte and Brian Shales, the coaches of World Champions, Riku Miura/Ryuichi Kihara.

The pair made their debut at the 2023 Japan Eastern Sectional Championships, which they won, before going on to also win the 2023–24 Japan Junior Championships.

Honda also competed in the men's singles event at the 2023–24 Japan Championships, where he finished a career-best tenth place. After the event, he announced his retirement from singles skating with the intention to focus on pair skating.

Shimizu/Honda were selected to compete at the 2024 World Junior Championships on the condition that they earn the minimum technical element scores to compete. Competing at the 2024 Bavarian Open, the pair finished eleventh, earning these minimum scores in the process. Going on to compete at the World Junior Championships, the pair placed fourteenth.

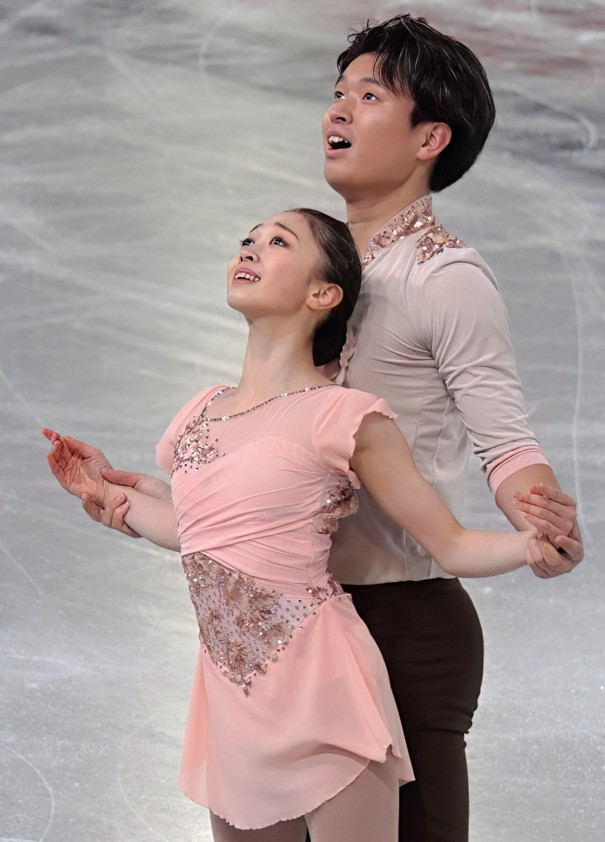
Shimizu/Honda during their free skate at the 2024–25 Junior Grand Prix Final

==== 2024–25 season ====
Competing on the 2024–25 ISU Junior Grand Prix circuit, the pair finished fourth at 2024 JGP Czech Republic and won the bronze medal at 2024 JGP Turkey. These results allowed the pair to qualify for the 2024–25 Junior Grand Prix Final in Grenoble, France.

In late November, the pair competed at the 2024–25 Japan Junior Championships, where they won the national title for a second consecutive time. This result ensured their qualification to compete at the senior championships. Going on to compete at the Junior Grand Prix Final, Shimizu/Honda would score personal bests in all three competition segments and finish fifth overall. Two weeks later, they competed at the 2024–25 Japan Championships. During their free skate, the pair stopped the performance after Shimizu dislocated her left shoulder following a fall during their attempted side-by-side jump combination. She then had her shoulder popped back into place so the pair could finish their performance. They would win the bronze medal overall and were subsequently named the World Junior team. Shimizu/Honda were also named to the World team on the condition that they could achieve the minimum technical element scores to compete at the event, which they were unable to do.

They concluded the season with an eleventh-place finish at the 2025 World Junior Championships in Debrecen, Hungary.

In April, the pair announced they had parted ways with Honda intending to continue competing in the pairs discipline.

=== Pair skating with Katogani ===
==== 2025–26 season ====
In July 2025, it was announced that Honda had teamed up with former singles skater, Ayumi Kagotani and that the pair would primarily train at the Kinoshita Academy in Uji, Kyoto. In December, the pair competed at the 2025–26 Japan Championships, where they won the silver medal behind Nagaoka/Moriguchi.

== Programs ==
=== Pair skating with Ayumi Katogani ===
Season	Short program	Free skating
2025–2026	Feeling Good by Anthony Newley & Leslie Bricusse performed by Muse choreo. by Cathy Reed	La Strada by Nino Rota choreo. by Cathy Reed

=== Pair skating with Sae Shimizu ===
Season	Short program	Free skating
2024–2025	Music Box: Wind Up by Dr. Sound FX; Swan Lake (Music Box Hollywood Sound Effects) by Pyotr Ilyich Tchaikovsky; Swan Lake Theme performed by David Garrett choreo. by Cathy Reed	Photograph / Clair de Lune by Claude Debussy & Cody Fry; Fantasietta on a Theme from “Photograph” by Cody Fry choreo. by Cathy Reed
2023–2024	Music Box: Wind Up by Dr. Sound FX; Swan Lake (Music Box Hollywood Sound Effects) by Pyotr Ilyich Tchaikovsky; Swan Lake Theme performed by David Garrett choreo. by Cathy Reed	West Side Story; The Dance at the Gym: Blues, Promenade; Maria; Balcony Scene (Tonight) by Leonard Bernstein & Stephen Sondheim performed by Rachel Zegler & Ansel Elgort choreo. by Cathy Reed

=== Men's singles ===
Season	Short program	Free skating	Exhibition
2023–2024	Black Betty by Ram Jam choreo. by Cathy Reed	Exogenesis: Symphony Part 3 (Redemption) by Muse choreo. by Mihoko Higuchi	
2022–2023	El Choclo by performed by Cello Project choreo. by Cathy Reed	Exogenesis: Symphony Part 3 (Redemption) by Muse choreo. by Mihoko Higuchi	
2021–2022	S.O.S d’un terrien un détresse by Daniel Balavoine performed by Dimash Qudaibergen choreo. by Cathy Reed	Blues for Klook by Eddy Louiss; The Prophet by Gary Moore choreo. by Cathy Reed	
2020–2021	S.O.S d’un terrien un détresse by Daniel Balavoine performed by Dimash Qudaibergen choreo. by Cathy Reed	Spectre; Los Muertos Vivos Estan by Thomas Newman; Writing's on the Wall by Sam Smith; The Name's Bond... James Bond by David Arnold choreo. by Cathy Reed	Katchi by Ofenbach choreo. by Cathy Reed
2019–2020	Crazy Little Thing Called Love by Queen choreo. by Cathy Reed	Spectre; Los Muertos Vivos Estan by Thomas Newman; Writing's on the Wall by Sam Smith; The Name's Bond... James Bond by David Arnold choreo. by Cathy Reed	

== Competitive highlights ==
- GP – Event of the ISU Grand Prix Series
- JGP – Event of the ISU Junior Grand Prix Series
- CS – Event of the ISU Challenger Series
- TBD – Assigned
- WD – Withdrew from competition
- C – Cancelled

=== Pair skating with Ayumi Katogani ===
Competition placements at senior level
Season	2025–26
Japan Championships	2nd

=== Pair skating with Sae Shimizu ===
International
Event	23–24	24–25
Asian Winter Games		6th
International: Junior
Junior Worlds	14th	11th
JGP Final		5th
JGP Czech Republic		4th
JGP Turkey		3rd
Bavarian Open	11th	
National
Japan		3rd
Japan Junior	1st	1st

=== Men's singles ===
International
Event	16–17	17–18	18–19	19–20	20–21	21–22	22–23	23–24
GP Finland							11th	
GP NHK Trophy					3rd			
CS Cup of Austria						2nd		
International: Junior
Junior Worlds					C	14th		
JGP Final						C		
Bavarian Open				3rd				
National
Japan				11th	13th	12th	21st	10th
Japan Junior	17th	16th	9th	3rd	1st			
Team events
Japan Open					2nd T 1st P			

== Detailed results ==
=== Pair skating with Ayumi Kagotani ===
Results in the 2025–26 season
Date	Event	SP		FS		Total	
Date	Event	P	Score	P	Score	P	Score
Dec 18–21, 2025	2025–26 Japan Championships	3	48.33	2	85.14	2	133.47

=== Pair skating with Sae Shimizu ===
ISU personal best scores in the +5/-5 GOE System
Segment	Type	Score	Event
Total	**TSS**	**145.66**	2024–25 JGP Final
Short program	**TSS**	**50.20**	2024–25 JGP Final
Short program	TES	26.58	2024–25 JGP Final
Short program	PCS	24.22	2025 World Junior Championships
Free skating	**TSS**	**95.46**	2024–25 JGP Final
Free skating	TES	48.57	2024 JGP Turkey
Free skating	PCS	48.73	2024–25 JGP Final

==== Senior level ====
Current personal best scores are highlighted in bold.

2024–25 season
Date	Event	SP	FS	Total
February 11–13, 2025	2025 Asian Winter Games	6; 45.69	6; 89.89	6; 135.58
December 19–22, 2024	2024–25 Japan Championships	3; 54.22	3; 82.50	3; 136.72

==== Junior level ====
Current personal best scores are highlighted in bold.

2024–25 season
Date	Event	SP	FS	Total
February 26–March 3, 2025	2025 World Junior Championships	11; 49.33	10; 92.50	11; 141.83
December 5–8, 2024	2024–25 JGP Final	5; **50.20**	4; **95.46**	5; **145.66**
November 15–17, 2024	2024–25 Japan Junior Championships	1; 48.51	1; 84.34	1; 132.83
September 18–21, 2024	2024 JGP Turkey	4; 48.04	3; 92.15	3; 140.19
September 4–7, 2024	2024 JGP Czech Republic	7; 44.96	3; 91.33	4; 136.29
2023–24 season
Date	Event	SP	FS	Total
February 26–March 3, 2024	2024 World Junior Championships	14; 43.69	14; 72.08	14; 115.77
January 1–February 4, 2024	2024 Bavarian Open	12; 39.82	7; 77.22	11; 117.04
November 17–19, 2023	2023–24 Japan Junior Championships	1; 40.00	1; 69.69	1; 109.69

=== Men's singles ===
ISU personal best scores in the +5/-5 GOE System
Segment	Type	Score	Event
Total	**TSS**	**225.89**	2021 CS Cup of Austria
Short program	**TSS**	**83.95**	2021 CS Cup of Austria
Short program	TES	46.15	2021 CS Cup of Austria
Short program	PCS	37.80	2021 CS Cup of Austria
Free skating	**TSS**	**141.94**	2021 CS Cup of Austria
Free skating	TES	67.24	2021 CS Cup of Austria
Free skating	PCS	74.70	2021 CS Cup of Austria

==== Senior level ====
Current personal best scores are highlighted in bold.

2023–24 season
Date	Event	SP	FS	Total
December 20–24, 2023	2023–24 Japan Championships	14; 73.58	10; 144.04	10; 217.62
2022–23 season
Date	Event	SP	FS	Total
December 21–25, 2022	2022–23 Japan Championships	20; 62.48	20; 118.39	21; 180.87
November 25–27, 2022	2022 Grand Prix of Espoo	10; 67.92	11; 129.98	11; 197.90
2021–22 season
Date	Event	SP	FS	Total
December 22–26, 2021	2021–22 Japan Championships	11; 78.53	11; 146.69	12; 225.22
November 11–14, 2021	2021 CS Cup of Austria	1; **83.95**	5; **141.94**	2; **225.89**
2020–21 season
Date	Event	SP	FS	Total
December 23–27, 2020	2020–21 Japan Championships	14; 67.52	13; 126.51	13; 194.03
November 27–29, 2020	2020 NHK Trophy	3; 79.22	6; 138.34	3; 217.56
October 3, 2020	2020 Japan Open	–	1; 137.99	1P/2T; 137.99
2019–20 season
Date	Event	SP	FS	Total
December 18–22, 2019	2019–20 Japan Championships	9; 75.72	12; 134.24	11; 209.96

==== Junior level ====
2021–22 season
Date	Event	SP	FS	Total
April 13–17, 2022	2022 World Junior Championships	9; 73.01	16; 123.82	14; 196.83
2020–21 season
Date	Event	SP	FS	Total
November 21–23, 2020	2020–21 Japan Junior Championships	1; 80.35	3; 129.13	1; 209.48
2019–20 season
Date	Event	SP	FS	Total
February 3–9, 2020	2020 Bavarian Open	2; 69.45	3; 126.25	3; 195.70
November 15–17, 2019	2019–20 Japan Junior Championships	4; 74.14	6; 120.61	3; 194.75
2018–19 season
Date	Event	SP	FS	Total
November 23–25, 2018	2018–19 Japan Junior Championships	7; 63.34	9; 111.29	9; 174.63
2017–18 season
Date	Event	SP	FS	Total
November 24–26, 2017	2017–18 Japan Junior Championships	15; 53.51	17; 92.72	16; 146.23
2016–17 season
Date	Event	SP	FS	Total
November 23–25, 2016	2016–17 Japan Junior Championships	16; 51.32	17; 99.51	17; 150.83
