= Brian Shales =

Canadian pair skater

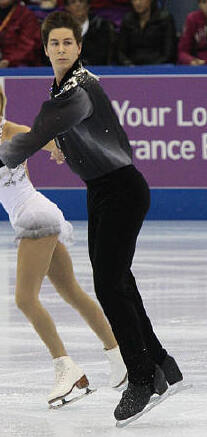

Personal information
- Born: June 3, 1985 (age 41) Mississauga, Ontario, Canada

Figure skating career
- Country: Canada
- Skating club: Kitchener-Waterloo SC

Brian Shales (born June 3, 1985) is a Canadian former pair skater. He represented Canada at the 2005 World Junior Championships.

== Career ==
In the 2004–05 season, Shales and Michelle Cronin won the Canadian national junior title and were selected to compete at the 2005 World Junior Championships, where they placed seventh. During their career, they trained at the Toronto Cricket Skating and Curling Club. Their partnership ended in December 2006.

Shales teamed up with Becky Cosford in 2007. They won the 2007 Ondrej Nepela Memorial silver medal and ended their partnership in 2008. He then teamed up with Brooke Paulin and competed with her in the 2008–09 season, placing 6th at the 2009 Canadian Figure Skating Championships.

He currently works as a pairs skating coach at the Skate Oakville Skating Club in Oakville, Ontario alongside Bruno Marcotte.

His current and former students include:

- Riku Miura / Ryuichi Kihara
- Kirsten Moore-Towers / Michael Marinaro
- Haruna Murakami / Sumitada Moriguchi
- Sophia Schaller / Livio Mayr
- Jazmine Desrochers / Kieran Thrasher
- Yuna Nagaoka / Sumitada Moriguchi
- Sae Shimizu / Lucas Tsuyoshi Honda
