= 2021–22 Japan Figure Skating Championships =

Figure skating competition

- Type: National championship
- Date: December 22–26, 2021 (S); November 19–21, 2021 (J)
- Season: 2021–22
- Location: Saitama, Saitama (S); Nagoya, Aichi (J)
- Host: Japan Skating Federation
- Venue: Saitama Super Arena (S); Nippon Gaishi Hall (J)

Champions
- Men's singles: Yuzuru Hanyu (S); Kao Miura (J)
- Women's singles: Kaori Sakamoto (S); Mao Shimada (J)
- Pairs: Miyu Yunoki / Shoya Ichihashi (S)
- Ice dance: Misato Komatsubara / Tim Koleto (S); Nao Kida / Masaya Morita (J)
- Previous: 2020–21 Japan Championships
- Next: 2022–23 Japan Championships

The 2021–22 Japan Figure Skating Championships were held in Saitama, Saitama on December 22–26, 2021. It was the 90th edition of the event. Medals were awarded in the disciplines of men's singles, women's singles, pairs, and ice dance. The results were part of the Japanese selection criteria for the 2022 Four Continents Championships, the 2022 Winter Olympics, and the 2022 World Championships.

== Qualifying ==
Competitors either qualified at regional and sectional competitions, held from September to November 2021, or earned a bye.

Date	Event	Type	Location	Results
September 23–26, 2021	Chu-Shikoku-Kyushu	Regional	Iizuka, Fukuoka	Details
September 24–26, 2021	Chubu	Regional	Nagoya, Aichi	Details
Sept. 30 – Oct. 3, 2021	Kanto	Regional	Chiba, Chiba	Details
October 1–3, 2021	Tohoku-Hokkaido	Regional	Sapporo, Hokkaido	Details
October 7–10, 2021	Kinki	Regional	Uji, Kyoto	Details
October 7–10, 2021	Tokyo	Regional	Nishitōkyō, Tokyo	Details
October 22–24, 2021	Japan Novice Championships	Final	Ōtsu, Shiga	Details
October 28–31, 2021	Eastern Section	Sectional	Nishitōkyō, Tokyo	Details
November 4–7, 2021	Western Section	Sectional	Fukuoka, Fukuoka	Details
November 19–21, 2021	Japan Junior Championships	Final	Nagoya, Aichi	Details
December 22–26, 2021	Japan Championships	Final	Saitama, Saitama	Details

== Medal summary ==
=== Senior ===
Discipline	Gold	Silver	Bronze
Men	Yuzuru Hanyu	Shoma Uno	Yuma Kagiyama
Women	Kaori Sakamoto	Wakaba Higuchi	Mana Kawabe
Pairs	Miyu Yunoki / Shoya Ichihashi	No other competitors	
Ice dance	Misato Komatsubara / Tim Koleto	Kana Muramoto / Daisuke Takahashi	Ayumi Takanami / Shingo Nishiyama

=== Junior ===
Discipline	Gold	Silver	Bronze
Men	Kao Miura	Tatsuya Tsuboi	Nozomu Yoshioka
Women	Mao Shimada	Rion Sumiyoshi	Mone Chiba
Pairs	No competitors		
Ice dance	Nao Kida / Masaya Morita	Ayano Sasaki / Atsuhiko Tamura	Kaho Yamashita / Yuto Nagata

=== Novice ===
Discipline	Gold	Silver	Bronze
Men (Novice A)	Rio Nakata	Taiga Nishino	Sena Takahashi
Men (Novice B)	Hayato Okazaki	Shin Takenaka	Sakutaro Yoshino
Women (Novice A)	Mao Shimada	Kaoruko Wada	Haruna Murakami
Women (Novice B)	Saho Ootake	Reina Kawakatsu	Riria Kono
Pairs	No competitors		
Ice dance	Sumire Yoshida / Ibuki Ogahara	Haru Matsuzaki / Haruki Motomura	Mihana Nakajima / Kenichiro Hirose

== Entries ==
A list of preliminary entries was published on December 4, 2021. Names with an asterisk (*) denote junior skaters.

Men	Women	Pairs	Ice dance
Reo Ishizuka	Yuna Aoki	~~Riku Miura / Ryuichi Kihara~~ (withdrew)	Misato Komatsubara / Tim Koleto
Shoma Uno	Nana Araki	Miyu Yunoki / Shoya Ichihashi	Ayumi Takanami / Shingo Nishiyama
Kosho Oshima*	Chisato Uramatsu		~~Nicole Takahashi / Shiloh Judd~~ (withdrew)
Yuma Kagiyama	Miyabi Oba		Kiria Hirayama / Aru Tateno
Takeru Kataise*	Ayumi Kagotani		~~Rikako Fukase / Eichu Cho~~ (withdrew)
Yuto Kishina	~~Tomoe Kawabata~~ (withdrew)		Kana Muramoto / Daisuke Takahashi
Kazuki Kushida	Mana Kawabe		~~Haruno Yajima / Yoshimitsu Ikeda~~ (withdrew)
Shun Sato	~~Rika Kihira~~ (withdrew)		
Koshiro Shimada	Kaori Sakamoto		
Takumi Sugiyama	Ibuki Satoh		
Gakuto Suzuki	Ayumi Shibayama*		
Rei Suzuki	Yuna Shiraiwa		
Mitsuki Sumoto	Rion Sumiyoshi*		
Keiji Tanaka	Niina Takeno		
Takaya Tsujimura	Hina Takeno		
Tatsuya Tsuboi*	Azusa Tanaka*		
Kazuki Tomono	Mone Chiba*		
Shunsuke Nakamura*	Ami Nakai*		
Kazuki Hasegawa	Rin Nitaya		
Yuzuru Hanyu	Nonoka Noguchi		
Koutaro Hayakawa	Wakaba Higuchi		
Yuga Furusho	Marin Honda		
Tatuma Furuya	Rino Matsuike		
Yoshimasa Hori	Akari Matsubara		
Lucas Tsuyoshi Honda	Mai Mihara		
Kao Miura*	Saki Miyake		
Sena Miyake	Satoko Miyahara		
Sumitada Moriguchi	Misaki Morishita		
Taichiro Yamakuma	Mako Yamashita		
Sōta Yamamoto	Yuhana Yokoi		
Nozomu Yoshioka*	Hana Yoshida*		
Kimichika Wada	Rinka Watanabe		

=== Junior ===
The top six finishers at the Japan Junior Championships in men's and women's singles were added to the Japan Championships. The women's junior national champion, Mao Shimada, was a novice skater and therefore not eligible for the senior Championships. The seventh-place finisher, Ami Nakai, was bumped up in Shimada's place.

	Men	Women
1	Kao Miura	Rion Sumiyoshi
2	Tatsuya Tsuboi	Mone Chiba
3	Nozomu Yoshioka	Hana Yoshida
4	Takeru Kataise	Azusa Tanaka
5	Kosho Oshima	Ayumi Shibayama
6	Shunsuke Nakamura	Ami Nakai

=== Changes to preliminary entries ===
Date	Discipline	Withdrew	Added	Reason/Other notes	Refs
December 15	Pairs	Riku Miura / Ryuichi Kihara	N/A	COVID-related travel restrictions	
December 15	Ice dance	Nicole Takahashi / Shiloh Judd	N/A	COVID-related travel restrictions	
December 15	Ice dance	Rikako Fukase / Eichu Cho	N/A	COVID-related travel restrictions	
December 21	Women	Rika Kihira	N/A	Right ankle injury	
December 22	Women	Tomoe Kawabata	N/A	Injury and lack of training due to traffic accident	
December 22	Ice dance	Haruno Yajima / Yoshimitsu Ikeda	N/A	Split	

== Results ==
=== Men ===
Rank	Name	Total points	SP		FS	
1	Yuzuru Hanyu	322.36	1	111.31	1	211.05
2	Shoma Uno	295.82	2	101.88	3	193.94
3	Yuma Kagiyama	292.41	3	95.15	2	197.26
4	Kao Miura	276.16	5	92.81	4	183.35
5	Kazuki Tomono	263.67	7	87.79	5	175.88
6	Sena Miyake	252.82	6	90.52	7	162.30
7	Shun Sato	252.13	8	87.27	6	164.86
8	Sōta Yamamoto	240.18	4	93.79	12	146.39
9	Tatsuya Tsuboi	235.21	12	77.31	8	157.90
10	Koshiro Shimada	233.67	9	86.76	10	146.91
11	Keiji Tanaka	232.42	10	84.10	9	148.32
12	Lucas Tsuyoshi Honda	225.22	11	78.53	11	146.69
13	Sumitada Moriguchi	201.30	13	76.14	16	125.16
14	Takeru Amine Kataise	199.65	16	69.32	14	130.33
15	Mitsuki Sumoto	199.62	17	68.55	13	131.07
16	Kosho Oshima	195.04	18	65.86	15	129.18
17	Kazuki Kushida	186.99	15	72.37	19	114.62
18	Reo Ishizuka	178.01	20	57.06	17	120.95
19	Takumi Sugiyama	174.70	19	65.34	20	109.36
20	Nozomu Yoshioka	170.57	14	72.94	24	97.63
21	Taichiro Yamakuma	170.56	22	55.11	18	115.45
22	Kazuki Hasegawa	161.92	21	56.86	22	105.06
23	Rei Suzuki	158.69	24	53.45	21	105.24
24	Gakuto Suzuki	152.85	23	55.00	23	97.85
Did not advance to free skating
25	Shunsuke Nakamura	52.78	25	52.78	—N/a	
26	Takaya Tsujimura	50.03	26	50.03	—N/a	
27	Tatuma Furuya	46.59	27	46.59	—N/a	
28	Yuga Furusho	45.99	28	45.99	—N/a	
29	Yuto Kishina	45.92	29	45.92	—N/a	
30	Kimichika Wada	42.34	30	42.34	—N/a	
31	Koutaro Hayakawa	38.52	31	38.52	—N/a	
32	Yoshimasa Hori	35.83	32	35.83	—N/a	

=== Women ===
Rank	Name	Total points	SP		FS	
1	Kaori Sakamoto	234.06	1	79.23	1	154.83
2	Wakaba Higuchi	221.78	2	74.66	2	147.12
3	Mana Kawabe	209.65	3	74.27	3	135.38
4	Mai Mihara	206.86	5	73.66	5	133.20
5	Satoko Miyahara	206.51	4	73.76	6	132.75
6	Rinka Watanabe	199.15	8	65.07	4	134.08
7	Rino Matsuike	198.77	6	72.31	7	126.46
8	Rion Sumiyoshi	189.16	7	67.39	11	121.77
9	Hana Yoshida	187.44	13	61.35	8	126.09
10	Ayumi Shibayama	186.12	11	62.48	10	123.64
11	Mone Chiba	184.30	9	64.41	12	119.89
12	Yuhana Yokoi	183.84	14	59.84	9	124.00
13	Mako Yamashita	179.61	12	61.84	13	117.77
14	Nana Araki	174.25	20	57.11	14	117.14
15	Ibuki Satoh	171.86	15	59.38	15	112.48
16	Akari Matsubara	170.73	17	59.13	16	111.60
17	Hina Takeno	169.57	16	59.33	17	110.24
18	Azusa Tanaka	168.45	10	63.92	19	104.53
19	Miyabi Oba	164.96	24	55.69	18	109.27
20	Ayumi Kagotani	158.39	22	55.80	20	102.59
21	Marin Honda	156.53	23	55.73	21	100.80
22	Chisato Uramatsu	152.86	18	58.41	22	94.45
23	Yuna Shiraiwa	145.89	21	56.93	23	88.96
24	Niina Takeno	141.84	19	58.36	24	83.48
Did not advance to free skating
25	Nonoka Noguchi	55.36	25	55.36	—N/a	
26	Saki Miyake	53.50	26	53.50	—N/a	
27	Ami Nakai	52.65	27	52.65	—N/a	
28	Misaki Morishita	48.37	29	48.37	—N/a	
29	Rin Nitaya	47.21	28	47.21	—N/a	
30	Yuna Aoki	46.90	30	46.90	—N/a	

=== Pairs ===
Rank	Name	Total points	SP		FS	
1	Miyu Yunoki / Shoya Ichihashi	115.72	1	34.77	1	80.95

=== Ice dance ===
Rank	Name	Total points	RD		FD	
1	Misato Komatsubara / Tim Koleto	178.17	1	68.16	2	110.01
2	Kana Muramoto / Daisuke Takahashi	176.31	2	63.35	1	112.96
3	Ayumi Takanami / Shingo Nishiyama	148.29	4	58.10	3	90.19
4	Kiria Hirayama / Aru Tateno	147.39	3	58.93	4	88.46

== Japan Junior Figure Skating Championships ==
The 2021–22 Japan Junior Figure Skating Championships were held in Nagoya, Aichi from November 19–21, 2021. The national champions in men's and women's singles earned automatic berths on the 2022 World Junior Championships team. Top finishers in men's and women's singles were invited to compete at the senior Japan Championships in December.

=== Entries ===
A list of preliminary entries was published on November 13, 2021. No pairs were entered. Names with an asterisk (*) denote novice skaters.

Men	Women	Ice dance
Shuntaro Asaga	Saki Isomura	Nao Kida / Masaya Morita
Kosho Oshima	Haruna Iwasaki	Haruhi Komatsu / Eisuke Kumano
Sakura Odagaki	Rena Uezono*	Ayano Sasaki / Atsuhiko Tamura
Haru Kakiuchi	Maria Egawa	Midori Fujiki / Seiya Shimokawa
Takeru Kataise	Marin Okamoto	Kaho Yamashita / Yuto Nagata
Keisuke Kadowaki	Yurina Okuno	
Ryusei Kikuchi	Kaho Kanno	
Ryota Kitamura	Ikura Kushida	
Tomoki Kimura	Chiduru Goto	
Shio Kojima	Chikako Saegusa	
Shun Kobayashi	Ayumi Shibayama	
Taiki Shinohara	Mao Shimada*	
Sora Suzuki	Sae Shimizu	
Tudoi Suto	Natsu Suzuki	
Seigo Tauchi	Rion Sumiyoshi	
Sena Takahashi*	Sakurako Daimon	
Sora Tarumi	Yo Takagi	
Tatsuya Tsuboi	Mone Takahashi	
Rio Nakata*	Azusa Tanaka	
Shunsuke Nakamura	Sakurako Tanabe	
Taiga Nishino*	Mone Chiba	
Atsushi Higuchi	Ami Nakai	
Haruki Honda	Haruna Murakami*	
Shunya Matsuoka	Aiko Motoe	
Kao Miura	Kei Yamada*	
Masaya Mishima	Miyu Yunoki	
Ryoga Morimoto	Kinayu Yokoi	
Ryushin Yamada	Hana Yoshida	
Nozomu Yoshioka	Rei Yoshimoto	
Yuki Yoshioka*	Kaoruko Wada*	

==== Novice ====
Top finishers at the Japan Novice Championships in men's and women's singles were added to the Japan Junior Championships.

	Men	Women
1	Rio Nakata	Mao Shimada
2	Taiga Nishino	Kaoruko Wada
3	Sena Takahashi	Haruna Murakami
4	Yuki Yoshioka	Kei Yamada
5		Rena Uezono

=== Results ===
==== Junior men ====
Rank	Name	Total points	SP		FS	
1	Kao Miura	229.28	7	64.00	1	165.28
2	Tatsuya Tsuboi	227.60	1	81.05	2	146.55
3	Nozomu Yoshioka	191.80	2	68.55	3	123.25
4	Takeru Amine Kataise	188.37	3	67.99	4	120.79
5	Kosho Oshima	183.86	6	65.31	5	118.55
6	Shunsuke Nakamura	180.13	4	67.49	6	112.71
7	Ryoga Morimoto	172.23	5	65.46	12	106.77
8	Ryusei Kikuchi	172.03	9	59.42	8	112.61
9	Shunya Matsuoka	170.33	8	63.00	11	107.33
10	Keisuke Kadowaki	169.53	11	56.88	7	112.65
11	Seigo Tauchi	166.21	12	56.73	10	109.48
12	Sena Takahashi	163.16	17	53.45	9	109.71
13	Shuntaro Asaga	156.92	14	55.92	13	101.00
14	Haru Kakiuchi	149.46	13	56.00	16	93.46
15	Tomoki Kimura	146.55	19	49.96	14	96.59
16	Tudoi Suto	145.36	16	53.51	18	91.85
17	Rio Nakata	141.47	10	57.87	23	84.60
18	Ryota Kitamura	140.75	23	46.43	15	94.32
19	Haruyuki Higuchi	138.93	20	48.69	20	90.24
20	Haruki Honda	138.79	24	46.86	17	91.93
21	Sora Tarumi	138.65	15	53.84	22	84.81
22	Shio Kojima	138.42	22	48.07	19	90.35
23	Masaya Mishima	137.08	21	48.15	21	88.93
24	Shun Kobayashi	133.58	18	51.03	24	82.55
Did not advance to free skating
25	Taiga Nishino	46.41	25	46.41	—N/a	
26	Taiki Shinohara	44.76	26	44.76	—N/a	
27	Ryushin Yamada	44.56	27	44.56	—N/a	
28	Sakura Odagaki	43.05	28	43.05	—N/a	
29	Sora Suzuki	35.43	29	35.43	—N/a	
30	Yuki Yoshioka	33.28	30	33.28	—N/a	

==== Junior women ====
Rank	Name	Total points	SP		FS	
1	Mao Shimada	188.51	4	61.76	1	126.75
2	Rion Sumiyoshi	180.25	1	65.34	3	114.91
3	Mone Chiba	175.41	7	58.97	2	116.44
4	Hana Yoshida	172.55	3	62.48	4	110.07
5	Azusa Tanaka	171.65	2	62.56	5	109.06
6	Ayumi Shibayama	166.68	5	60.17	8	106.51
7	Ami Nakai	165.76	10	56.78	6	108.98
8	Ikura Kushida	165.09	9	57.35	7	107.74
9	Sakurako Daimon	160.47	6	59.95	11	100.52
10	Yo Takagi	158.58	11	55.84	10	102.74
11	Kaoruko Wada	156.77	12	52.89	9	103.88
12	Yurina Okuno	152.86	8	58.02	14	94.84
13	Sae Shimizu	149.07	19	50.06	12	99.01
14	Marin Okamoto	146.96	21	49.29	13	97.67
15	Kaho Kanno	145.15	16	51.39	15	93.76
16	Maria Egawa	144.18	15	51.53	16	92.65
17	Haruna Iwasaki	143.09	14	51.85	17	91.24
18	Rena Uezono	136.05	20	49.32	18	86.73
19	Kei Yamada	135.09	18	50.38	20	84.71
20	Kinayu Yokoi	134.52	23	48.73	19	85.76
21	Chiduru Goto	131.63	17	50.74	21	80.89
22	Chikako Saigusa	128.73	13	52.28	23	76.45
23	Mone Takahashi	126.24	24	47.66	22	78.58
24	Natsu Suzuki	123.45	22	48.74	24	74.71
Did not advance to free skating
25	Haruna Murakami	47.36	25	47.36	—N/a	
26	Miyu Yunoki	46.98	26	46.98	—N/a	
27	Sakurako Tanabe	46.50	27	46.50	—N/a	
28	Aiko Motoe	45.99	28	45.99	—N/a	
29	Saki Isomura	45.19	29	45.19	—N/a	
30	Rei Yoshimoto	42.02	30	42.02	—N/a	

==== Junior ice dance ====
Rank	Name	Total points	RD		FD	
1	Nao Kida / Masaya Morita	131.06	1	52.44	1	78.62
2	Ayano Sasaki / Atsuhiko Tamura	122.99	2	48.33	2	74.66
3	Kaho Yamashita / Yuto Nagata	106.40	3	39.22	3	67.18
4	Midori Fujiki / Seiya Shimokawa	95.69	4	36.41	4	59.28
5	Haruhi Komatsu / Eisuke Kumano	84.26	5	33.95	5	50.31

== International team selections ==
=== Four Continents Championships ===
The 2022 Four Continents Championships were held in Tallinn, Estonia from January 18–23, 2022.

	Men	Women	Pairs	Ice dance
1	Kao Miura	Rino Matsuike		Kana Muramoto / Daisuke Takahashi
2	Sena Miyake	Mai Mihara		
3	Kazuki Tomono	~~Satoko Miyahara~~ (withdrew)		
1st alt.	Shun Sato	Yuhana Yokoi (called up)		Rikako Fukase / Eichu Cho
2nd alt.	Sōta Yamamoto	Mako Yamashita		
3rd alt.	Koshiro Shimada			

=== Winter Olympics ===
The 2022 Winter Olympics were held in Beijing, China from February 4–20, 2022.

	Men	Women	Pairs	Ice dance
1	Yuzuru Hanyu	Kaori Sakamoto	Riku Miura / Ryuichi Kihara	Misato Komatsubara / Tim Koleto
2	Shoma Uno	Wakaba Higuchi		
3	Yuma Kagiyama	Mana Kawabe		
1st alt.	Kao Miura	Mai Mihara		Kana Muramoto / Daisuke Takahashi
2nd alt.	Kazuki Tomono	Satoko Miyahara		
3rd alt.	Sena Miyake	Rino Matsuike		

=== World Junior Championships ===
Commonly referred to as "Junior Worlds", the 2022 World Junior Championships will be held in Tallinn, Estonia from April 13-17, 2022.

	Men	Women	Pairs	Ice dance
1	Kao Miura	Rion Sumiyoshi		Nao Kida / Masaya Morita
2	~~Shun Sato~~ (withdrew)	Rinka Watanabe		
3	Tatsuya Tsuboi			
1st alt.	Lucas Tsuyoshi Honda (called up)	Rino Matsuike		
2nd alt.	Nozomu Yoshioka	Hana Yoshida		

=== World Championships ===
The 2022 World Championships were held in Montpellier, France from March 21–27, 2022.

	Men	Women	Pairs	Ice dance
1	~~Yuzuru Hanyu~~ (withdrew)	Kaori Sakamoto	Riku Miura / Ryuichi Kihara	Kana Muramoto / Daisuke Takahashi
2	Shoma Uno	Wakaba Higuchi		
3	Yuma Kagiyama	Mana Kawabe		
1st alt.	Kao Miura	Mai Mihara		Misato Komatsubara / Tim Koleto
2nd alt.	Kazuki Tomono (called up)	Satoko Miyahara		
3rd alt.	Sena Miyake	Rino Matsuike		
