= 2024–25 Japan Figure Skating Championships =

Figure skating competition

- Type: National championship
- Date: December 19–22, 2024 (S); November 15–17, 2024 (J)
- Season: 2024–25
- Location: Kadoma, Osaka (S); Hiroshima, Hiroshima (J)
- Host: Japan Skating Federation
- Venue: Osaka Prefectural Kadoma Sports Center (S); Hiroshin Big Wave (J)

Champions
- Men's singles: Yuma Kagiyama (S); Rio Nakata (J)
- Women's singles: Kaori Sakamoto (S); Mao Shimada (J)
- Pairs: Riku Miura / Ryuichi Kihara (S); Sae Shimizu / Lucas Tsuyoshi Honda (J)
- Ice dance: Utana Yoshida / Masaya Morita (S); Sara Kishimoto / Atsuhiko Tamura (J)
- Previous: 2023–24 Japan Championships
- Next: 2025–26 Japan Championships

The 2024–25 Japan Figure Skating Championships were held in Kadoma, Osaka on December 19–22, 2024. It was the 93rd edition of the event. Medals were awarded in the disciplines of men's singles, women's singles, pairs, and ice dance. The results were part of the Japanese selection criteria for the 2025 Four Continents Championships and the 2025 World Championships.

== Qualifying ==
Competitors either qualified at regional and sectional competitions, held from September to November 2024, or earned a bye.

Date	Event	Type	Location	Results
September 20–23, 2024	Tokyo	Regional	Funabashi, Chiba	Details
September 21–23, 2024	Chubu	Regional	Nagoya, Aichi	Details
September 26–29, 2024	Kanto	Regional	Nikkō, Tochigi	Details
September 26–29, 2024	Kinki	Regional	Takaishi, Osaka	Details
October 4–6, 2024	Tohoku-Hokkaido	Regional	Sapporo, Hokkaido	Details
October 3–6, 2024	Chu-Shikoku-Kyushu	Regional	Kurashiki, Okayama	Details
October 18–20, 2024	Japan Novice Championships	Final	Amagasaki, Hyōgo Prefecture	Details
October 24–27, 2024	Eastern Section	Sectional	Hachinohe, Aomori	Details
November 1–4, 2024	Western Section	Sectional	Nagoya, Aichi	Details
November 15–17, 2024	Japan Junior Championships	Final	Hiroshima, Hishoma	Details
December 19–22, 2024	Japan Championships	Final	Kadoma, Osaka	Details

== Medal summary ==
=== Senior ===
Discipline	Gold	Silver	Bronze
Men	Yuma Kagiyama	Rio Nakata	Tatsuya Tsuboi
Women	Kaori Sakamoto	Mao Shimada	Wakaba Higuchi
Pairs	Riku Miura / Ryuichi Kihara	Yuna Nagaoka / Sumitada Moriguchi	Sae Shimizu / Lucas Tsuyoshi Honda
Ice dance	Utana Yoshida / Masaya Morita	Azusa Tanaka / Shingo Nishiyama	Ayano Sasaki / Yoshimitsu Ikeda

=== Junior ===
Discipline	Gold	Silver	Bronze
Men	Rio Nakata	Sena Takahashi	Taiga Nishino
Women	Mao Shimada	Kaoruko Wada	Ikura Kushida
Pairs	Sae Shimizu / Lucas Tsuyoshi Honda	No other competitors	
Ice dance	Sara Kishimoto / Atsuhiko Tamura	Sumire Yoshida / Ibuki Ogahara	Kaho Yamashita / Yuto Nagata

== Entries ==
Names with an asterisk (*) denote junior skaters.

Men	Women	Pairs	Ice dance
Shuntaro Asaga*	Yuna Aoki	Riku Miura / Ryuichi Kihara	Mia Kuneshita / Seiya Alec Roueche
Daiya Ebihara*	Mone Chiba	Yuna Nagaoka / Sumitada Moriguchi	Ayano Sasaki / Yoshimitsu Ikeda
Haruki Honda	Maria Egawa	Sae Shimizu / Lucas Tsuyoshi Honda*	Azusa Tanaka / Shingo Nishiyama
Yuma Kagiyama	Wakaba Higuchi	Miyu Yunoki / Tristan Taylor	Utana Yoshida / Masaya Morita
Haru Kakiuchi*	Kiri Hirakane		
Takeru Amine Kataise	Ayumi Kagotani		
Ryusei Kikuchi	Mana Kawabe		
Yuto Kishina	Ikura Kushida*		
Ryota Kitamura	Rino Matsuike		
Shun Kobayashi	Mai Mihara		
Shunya Matsuoka	Saki Miyake		
Kao Miura	Haruna Murakami*		
Sena Miyake	Chiyono Nagami		
Ryoto Mori*	Ami Nakai*		
Shunsuke Nakamura	Miyabi Oba		
Rio Nakata*	Mayuko Oka*		
Taiga Nishino*	Mei Okada*		
Nobunari Oda	Yurina Okuno		
Kosho Oshima	Chikako Saigusa		
Shun Sato	Kaori Sakamoto		
Koshiro Shimada	Mao Shimada*		
Takumi Sugiyama	Yuna Shiraiwa		
Sena Takahashi*	Rion Sumiyoshi		
Haruto Toda	Mai Takahashi		
Kazuki Tomono	Rena Uezono*		
Tatsuya Tsuboi	Kaoruko Wada*		
Shun Uemura*	Rinka Watanabe		
Ryushin Yamada	Mako Yamashita		
Sōta Yamamoto	Hana Yoshida		
Nozomu Yoshioka

=== Junior ===
The top eight finishers at the Japan Junior Championships in men's and women's singles were added to the Japan Championships.

	Men	Women	Pairs
1	Rio Nakata	Mao Shimada	Sae Shimizu / Lucas Tsuyoshi Honda
2	Sena Takahashi	Kaoruko Wada	
3	Taiga Nishino	Ikura Kushida	
4	Shun Uemura	Ami Nakai	
5	Shuntaro Asago	Rena Uezono	
6	Haru Kakiuchi	Haruna Murakami	
7	Ryoto Mori	Mayuko Oka	
8	Daiya Ebihara	Mei Okada	

== Results ==
=== Men ===
Men's results
Rank	Name	Total points	SP		FS	
1	Yuma Kagiyama	297.73	1	92.05	1	205.68
2	Rio Nakata	263.99	2	90.31	2	173.68
3	Tatsuya Tsuboi	247.31	14	73.94	3	173.37
4	Nobunari Oda	234.68	5	84.53	6	150.15
5	Kazuki Tomono	233.95	3	89.72	8	144.23
6	Sena Miyake	233.49	11	75.16	4	158.33
7	Shun Sato	230.80	6	81.90	7	148.90
8	Kao Miura	230.09	4	88.87	9	141.22
9	Koshiro Shimada	224.04	15	73.20	5	150.84
10	Sōta Yamamoto	217.09	7	80.10	12	136.99
11	Shunsuke Nakamura	214.25	13	73.96	10	140.29
12	Taiga Nishino	213.07	9	77.58	14	135.49
13	Takeru Amine Kataise	212.78	10	75.62	11	137.16
14	Sena Takahashi	209.79	8	77.87	17	131.92
15	Takumi Sugiyama	208.75	16	72.93	13	135.82
16	Kosho Oshima	206.99	12	74.37	16	132.62
17	Haru Kakiuchi	203.27	17	70.52	15	132.75
18	Shuntaro Asaga	199.33	19	67.58	18	131.75
19	Daiya Ebihara	192.81	20	64.66	19	128.15
20	Yuto Kishina	191.05	18	68.84	21	122.21
21	Shun Uemura	185.97	23	62.47	20	123.50
22	Nozomu Yoshioka	181.29	21	63.76	22	117.53
23	Ryusei Kikuchi	169.29	22	62.77	23	106.52
24	Ryushin Yamada	146.49	24	60.20	24	86.29
Did not advance to free skating
25	Ryota Kitamura	58.91	25	58.91	—N/a	
26	Shunya Matsuoka	53.48	26	53.48	—N/a	
27	Haruto Toda	53.34	27	53.34	—N/a	
28	Ryoto Mori	50.32	28	50.32	—N/a	
29	Haruki Honda	50.14	29	50.14	—N/a	
30	Shun Kobayashi	45.96	30	45.96	—N/a	

=== Women ===
Women's results
Rank	Name	Total points	SP		FS	
1	Kaori Sakamoto	228.68	1	78.92	1	149.76
2	Mao Shimada	219.00	2	75.58	2	143.42
3	Wakaba Higuchi	206.40	4	71.05	3	135.35
4	Mone Chiba	205.69	3	74.72	7	130.97
5	Rino Matsuike	204.00	5	70.79	5	133.21
6	Mako Yamashita	200.25	12	65.13	4	135.12
7	Rinka Watanabe	198.55	11	65.96	6	132.59
8	Rion Sumiyoshi	197.53	7	69.58	11	127.95
9	Saki Miyake	196.55	8	68.54	9	128.01
10	Kaoruko Wada	195.63	10	66.70	8	128.93
11	Hana Yoshida	195.27	9	68.42	13	126.85
12	Yuna Aoki	194.07	6	70.07	14	124.00
13	Mana Kawabe	190.23	14	62.25	10	127.98
14	Ikura Kushida	187.14	13	64.46	16	122.68
15	Ami Nakai	182.50	21	55.20	12	127.30
16	Mayuko Oka	181.82	17	60.71	17	121.11
17	Haruna Murakami	180.21	19	57.26	15	122.95
18	Mei Okada	179.76	16	61.28	19	118.48
19	Yuna Shiraiwa	178.72	18	59.00	18	119.72
20	Maria Egawa	173.93	15	61.29	20	112.64
21	Miyabi Oba	163.19	20	57.03	21	106.16
22	Kiri Hirakane	149.42	22	51.96	23	97.46
23	Chiyono Nagami	149.22	24	51.06	22	98.16
WD	Mai Mihara	withdrew	23	51.94	withdrew from competition	
Did not advance to free skating
25	Ayumi Kagotani	49.52	25	49.52	—N/a	
26	Rena Uezono	48.08	26	48.08	—N/a	
27	Mai Takahashi	46.43	27	46.43	—N/a	
28	Chikako Saigusa	45.12	28	45.12	—N/a	
29	Yurina Okuno	44.17	29	44.17	—N/a	

=== Pairs ===
Pairs results
Rank	Name	Total points	SP		FS	
1	Riku Miura / Ryuichi Kihara	212.33	1	74.16	1	138.17
2	Yuna Nagaoka / Sumitada Moriguchi	176.68	2	61.82	2	114.86
3	Sae Shimizu / Lucas Tsuyoshi Honda	136.72	3	54.22	3	82.50
4	Miyu Yunoki / Tristan Taylor	126.81	4	46.75	4	80.06

=== Ice dance ===
Ice dance results
Rank	Name	Total points	RD		FD	
1	Utana Yoshida / Masaya Morita	176.21	1	71.84	1	104.37
2	Azusa Tanaka / Shingo Nishiyama	168.92	2	66.03	2	102.89
3	Ayano Sasaki / Yoshimitsu Ikeda	141.09	3	55.53	3	85.56
4	Mia Kuneshita / Seiya Alec Roueche	100.19	4	36.62	4	63.57

== Japan Junior Figure Skating Championships ==
The 2024–25 Japan Junior Figure Skating Championships were held in Hiroshima, Hiroshima from November 15–17, 2024. The national champions in men's and women's singles earned automatic berths on the 2025 World Junior Championships. Top finishers in men's and women's singles were invited to compete at the senior Japan Championships in December.

=== Entries ===
Names with an asterisk (*) denote novice skaters.

Men	Women	Pairs	Ice dance
Shuntaro Asaga	Miku Enomoto*	Sae Shimizu / Lucas Tsuyoshi Honda	Sara Kishimoto / Atsuhiko Tamura
Daiya Ebihara	Yurika Imazeki		Mie Nakajima / Eisuke Kumano
Taiga Hara*	Aiko Iwamoto		Ayumi Shibayama / Tomoki Kimura
Haruhisa Hidaka*	Sumika Kanazawa*		Kaho Yamashita / Yuto Nagata
Iori Horino*	Reina Kawakatsu		Sumire Yoshida / Ibuki Ogahara
Ryu Ikeda	Riria Kono		
Hiroto Ishihara	Ikura Kushida		
Tachi Isowa	Hikari Matsunami		
Haru Kakiuchi	Shigeta Mihoshi		
Soto Koyama	Karin Miyazaki*		
Yuki Matsumoto	Haruna Murakami		
Ryoto Mori	Ami Nakai		
Ryoga Morimoto	Ayumi Nakao		
Kazuhiro Nagura	Yuko Ohno		
Rio Nakata	Mayuko Oka		
Taiga Nishino	Mei Okada		
Masato Obayashi	Saho Otake		
Ibuki Ogahara	Hono Segawa		
Hiroyoshi Ogata	Aiwa Shimada		
Hayato Okazaki	Mao Shimada		
Riku Sakuma*	Umi Sugimoto		
Haruto Sasaki	Nana Sugiyama		
Kazuna Sato	Hana Suzuki		
Tsudoi Suto	Yo Takagi		
Minato Taguchi	Hanaha Takeshima*		
Sena Takahashi	Rena Uezono		
Reon Tanaka	Kaoruko Wada		
Seigo Tauchi	Kei Yamada		
Shun Uemura	Hiroyuki Yokota		
Sakutaro Yoshino*	Sumire Yoshida		

==== Novice ====
Top finishers at the Japan Novice Championships in men's and women's singles were added to the Japan Junior Championships.

	Men	Women
1	Riku Sakuma	Sumika Kanazawa
2	Sakutaro Yoshino	Karin Miyazaki
3	Taiga Hara	Miku Enomoto
4	Haruhisa Hidaka	Hanaha Takeshima

=== Results ===
==== Junior men ====
Junior men's results
Rank	Name	Total points	SP		FS	
1	Rio Nakata	220.47	2	77.92	1	142.55
2	Sena Takahashi	212.99	1	79.28	4	133.71
3	Taiga Nishino	208.49	3	75.85	5	132.64
4	Shun Uemura	206.92	4	69.12	2	137.80
5	Shuntaro Asaga	201.00	6	65.25	3	135.75
6	Haru Kakiuchi	187.93	15	58.05	6	129.88
7	Ryoto Mori	67.63	5	117.19	10	184.82
8	Daiya Ebihara	184.23	8	63.50	8	120.73
9	Seigo Tauchi	183.29	11	61.18	7	122.11
10	Tsudoi Suto	179.84	7	64.34	12	115.50
11	Reon Tanaka	179.19	10	61.39	9	117.80
12	Ryu Ikeda	177.35	9	61.95	13	115.40
13	Ryoga Morimoto	172.84	18	55.87	11	116.97
14	Hiroyoshi Ogata	167.91	17	56.40	14	111.51
15	Soto Koyama	164.87	16	56.90	16	107.97
16	Hayato Okazaki	163.96	14	58.88	18	105.08
17	Taichi Isowa	163.28	13	60.27	20	103.01
18	Kazuhiro Nagura	160.98	22	52.92	15	108.06
19	Kazuna Sato	160.62	20	53.57	17	107.05
20	Yuki Matsumoto	157.27	23	52.21	19	105.06
21	Ibuki Ogahara	156.24	12	60.78	22	95.46
22	Hiroto Ishihara	152.15	19	54.39	21	97.76
23	Riku Sakuma	144.78	19	53.08	23	91.70
24	Haruto Sasaki	132.37	24	49.20	24	83.17
Did not advance to free skating
25	Haruhisa Hidaka	47.53	25	47.53	—N/a	
26	Taiga Hara	47.35	26	47.35	—N/a	
27	Minato Taguchi	46.78	27	46.78	—N/a	
28	Masato Obayashi	46.62	28	46.62	—N/a	
29	Sakutaro Yoshino	43.65	29	43.65	—N/a	
30	Iori Horino	42.01	30	42.01	—N/a	

==== Junior women ====
Junior women's results
Rank	Name	Total points	SP		FS	
1	Mao Shimada	201.32	1	72.69	1	128.63
2	Kaoruko Wada	190.17	2	66.40	4	123.77
3	Ikura Kushida	189.52	3	64.54	2	124.98
4	Ami Nakai	180.83	5	62.52	8	118.31
5	Rena Uezono	180.69	10	58.06	5	122.63
6	Haruna Murakami	177.59	8	59.06	7	118.53
7	Mayuko Oka	176.78	9	58.23	6	118.55
8	Mei Okada	174.51	21	49.72	3	124.79
9	Karin Miyazaki	172.77	6	60.60	10	112.17
10	Sumika Kanazawa	167.00	7	60.31	13	106.69
11	Kei Yamada	165.29	16	51.49	9	113.80
12	Saho Otake	162.26	11	57.51	15	104.75
13	Ayumi Nakao	160.90	12	54.36	14	106.54
14	Yo Takagi	160.48	14	52.82	11	107.66
15	Reina Kawakatsu	158.13	17	50.94	12	107.19
16	Hikari Matsunami	150.97	13	53.29	16	97.68
17	Riria Kono	150.17	4	62.58	21	87.59
18	Hiroyuki Yokota	143.87	15	51.56	19	92.31
19	Hana Suzuki	142.36	22	49.61	17	92.75
20	Sumire Yoshida	140.62	20	50.24	20	90.38
21	Aiko Iwamoto	140.11	24	47.59	18	92.52
22	Yurika Imazeki	133.95	18	50.78	22	83.17
23	Shigeta Mihoshi	126.75	23	48.39	23	78.36
24	Hono Segawa	122.47	19	50.32	24	72.15
Did not advance to free skating
25	Hanaha Takeshima	47.48	25	47.48	—N/a	
26	Yuko Ohno	47.20	26	47.20	—N/a	
27	Miku Enomoto	47.05	27	47.05	—N/a	
28	Aiwa Shimada	46.90	28	46.90	—N/a	
29	Umi Sugimoto	44.61	29	44.61	—N/a	
30	Nana Sugiyama	41.18	30	41.18	—N/a	

==== Junior pairs ====
Junior pairs results
Rank	Name	Total points	SP		FS	
1	Sae Shimizu / Lucas Tsuyoshi Honda	132.83	1	48.51	1	84.32

==== Junior ice dance ====
Junior ice dance results
Rank	Name	Total points	RD		FD	
1	Sara Kishimoto / Atsuhiko Tamura	146.17	1	58.73	1	87.44
2	Sumire Yoshida / Ibuki Ogahara	139.91	2	57.04	2	82.87
3	Kaho Yamashita / Yuto Nagata	137.22	3	54.97	3	82.25
4	Ayumi Shibayama / Tomoki Kimura	133.38	4	52.28	4	81.10
5	Mie Nakajima / Eisuke Kumano	103.55	5	40.24	5	63.31

== International team selections ==
=== Winter University Games ===
The 2025 Winter World University Games were held in Turin, Italy from January 13–23, 2025.

	Men	Women
1	Yuma Kagiyama	Mone Chiba
2	Shun Sato	Rion Sumiyoshi
3	~~Kao Miura~~ (withdrew)	Hana Yoshida
1st alt.	Sōta Yamamoto (called up)	Rinka Watanabe
2nd alt.	Tatsuya Tsuboi	Rino Matsuike
3rd alt.	Koshiro Shimada	Saki Miyake

=== Asian Winter Games ===
The 2025 Asian Winter Games were held in Harbin, China from February 7–14, 2025.

	Men	Women	Pairs	Ice dance
1	Yuma Kagiyama	Kaori Sakamoto	Yuna Nagaoka / Sumitada Moriguchi	Utana Yoshida / Masaya Morita
2	Shun Sato	Hana Yoshida	Sae Shimizu / Lucas Tsuyoshi Honda	Azusa Tanaka / Shingo Nishiyama

=== Four Continents Championships ===
The 2025 Four Continents Championships were held in Seoul, South Korea from February 19–23, 2025.

	Men	Women	Pairs	Ice dance
1	Kao Miura	Mone Chiba	Riku Miura / Ryuichi Kihara	Utana Yoshida / Masaya Morita
2	Tatsuya Tsuboi	Wakaba Higuchi	Yuna Nagaoka / Sumitada Moriguchi	Azusa Tanaka / Shingo Nishiyama
3	Kazuki Tomono	Rino Matsuike		
1st alt.	Shun Sato	Rinka Watanabe		
2nd alt.	Koshiro Shimada	Rion Sumiyoshi		
3rd alt.		Mako Yamashita		

=== World Junior Championships ===
Commonly referred to as "Junior Worlds", the 2025 World Junior Championships were held in Debrecen, Hungary from February 25 – March 2, 2025.

	Men	Women	Pairs	Ice dance
1	Rio Nakata	Mao Shimada	Sae Shimizu / Lucas Tsuyoshi Honda	Sara Kishimoto / Atsuhito Tamura
2	Sena Takahashi	Kaoruko Wada		
3	Shunsuke Nakamura	Ami Nakai		
1st alt.	Taiga Nishino	Ikura Kushida		Kaho Yamashita / Yuto Nagata
2nd alt.	Haru Kakiuchi	Mei Okada		
3rd alt.	Daiya Ebihara	Haruna Murakami		

=== World Championships ===
The 2025 World Championships were held in Boston, Massachusetts, United States from March 25–30, 2025.

	Men	Women	Pairs	Ice dance
1	Yuma Kagiyama	Kaori Sakamoto	Riku Miura / Ryuichi Kihara	Utana Yoshida / Masaya Morita
2	Shun Sato	Mone Chiba	Yuna Nagaoka / Sumitada Moriguchi	
3	Tatsuya Tsuboi	Wakaba Higuchi	Sae Shimizu / Lucas Tsuyoshi Honda	
1st alt.	Kao Miura	Rino Matsuike		
2nd alt.	Kazuki Tomono	Rion Sumiyoshi		
3rd alt.	Sōta Yamamoto	Hana Yoshida		
