= 2023–24 Japan Figure Skating Championships =

Figure skating competition

- Type: National championship
- Date: December 20–24, 2023 (S); November 17–19, 2023 (J)
- Season: 2023–24
- Location: Nagano, Nagano (S); Ōtsu, Shiga (J)
- Host: Japan Skating Federation
- Venue: Nagano Wakasato Tamokuteki Sports Arena (S); Shiga Prefectural Ice Arena (J)

Champions
- Men's singles: Shoma Uno (S); Shunsuke Nakamura (J)
- Women's singles: Kaori Sakamoto (S); Mao Shimada (J)
- Pairs: Yuna Nagaoka / Sumitada Moriguchi (S); Sae Shimizu / Lucas Tsuyoshi Honda (J)
- Ice dance: Misato Komatsubara / Tim Koleto (S); Sara Kishimoto / Atsuhiko Tamura (J)
- Previous: 2022–23 Japan Championships
- Next: 2024–25 Japan Championships

The 2023–24 Japan Figure Skating Championships were held in Nagano, Nagano on December 20–24, 2023. It was the 92nd edition of the event. Medals were awarded in the disciplines of men's singles, women's singles, pairs, and ice dance. The results were part of the Japanese selection criteria for the 2024 Four Continents Championships and the 2024 World Championships.

== Qualifying ==
Competitors either qualified at regional and sectional competitions, held from September to November 2023, or earned a bye.

Date	Event	Type	Location	Results
September 21–24, 2023	Tokyo	Regional	Nishitōkyō, Tokyo	Details
September 22–24, 2023	Chubu	Regional	Nagoya, Aichi	Details
Sep. 28 – Oct. 1, 2023	Kinki	Regional	Ōtsu, Shiga	Details
Sep. 29 – Oct. 1, 2023	Tohoku-Hokkaido	Regional	Niigata, Niigata	Details
October 6–9, 2023	Kanto	Regional	Yokohama, Kanagawa	Details
October 6–9, 2023	Chu-Shikoku-Kyushu	Regional	Fukuoka, Fukuoka	Details
October 20–22, 2023	Japan Novice Championships	Final	Nishitōkyō, Tokyo	Details
October 25–29, 2023	Western Section	Sectional	Hiroshima, Hiroshima	Details
November 2–5, 2023	Eastern Section	Sectional	Hachinohe, Aomori	Details
November 17–19, 2023	Japan Junior Championships	Final	Ōtsu, Shiga	Details
December 20–24, 2023	Japan Championships	Final	Nagano, Nagano Prefecture	Details

== Medal summary ==
=== Senior ===
Discipline	Gold	Silver	Bronze
Men	Shoma Uno	Yuma Kagiyama	Sōta Yamamoto
Women	Kaori Sakamoto	Mone Chiba	Mao Shimada
Pairs	Yuna Nagaoka / Sumitada Moriguchi	No other competitors	
Ice dance	Misato Komatsubara / Tim Koleto	Azusa Tanaka / Shingo Nishiyama	Utana Yoshida / Masaya Morita

=== Junior ===
Discipline	Gold	Silver	Bronze
Men	Shunsuke Nakamura	Rio Nakata	Tsudoi Suto
Women	Mao Shimada	Ikura Kushida	Rena Uezono
Pairs	Sae Shimizu / Lucas Tsuyoshi Honda	No other competitors	
Ice dance	Sara Kishimoto / Atsuhiko Tamura	Kaho Yamashita / Yuto Nagata	No other competitors

=== Novice ===
Discipline	Gold	Silver	Bronze
Men (Novice A)	Hayato Okazaki	Sakutaro Yoshino	Haruki Matsumoto
Men (Novice B)	Haruhisa Hidaka	Aoi Kimura	Riku Sakuma
Women (Novice A)	Sumika Kanazawa	Riria Kono	Saho Otake
Women (Novice B)	Karin Miyazaki	Rinka Yajima	Narumi Mori
Pairs	No competitors		
Ice dance	Sumire Yoshida / Ibuki Ogahara	Nanoha Yahata / Yuga Takemasa	Miu Takeuchi / Haruki Tsuchiya

== Entries ==
A list of preliminary entries was published on November 25, 2023. Names with an asterisk (*) denote junior skaters.

Men	Women	Pairs	Ice dance
Shoma Uno	Yuna Aoki	Yuna Nagaoka / Sumitada Moriguchi	Akari Kinoshita / Takahiko Tamura
Daiya Ebihara*	Nana Araki	~~Riku Miura / Ryuichi Kihara~~	Yuri Kunimura / Kaiji Sakabe
Kosho Oshima	Maaya Ishida		Misato Komatsubara / Tim Koleto
Sakura Odagaki	Rena Uezono*		Ayano Sasaki / Yoshimitsu Ikeda
Haru Kakiuchi*	Maria Egawa		Azusa Tanaka / Shingo Nishiyama
Yuma Kagiyama	Miyabi Oba		Utana Yoshida / Masaya Morita
Takeru Amine Kataise	Mana Kawabe		
Keisuke Kadowaki	Ikura Kushida*		
Yuto Kishina	Chikako Saigusa		
Ryota Kitamura	Kaori Sakamoto		
Kazuki Kushida	Ayumi Shibayama*		
Haruya Sasaki	Mao Shimada*		
Shun Sato	Sae Shimizu		
Minato Shiga	Yuna Shiraiwa		
Koshiro Shimada	Natsu Suzuki		
Takumi Sugiyama	Rion Sumiyoshi		
Tsudoi Suto*	Yo Takagi*		
Seigo Tauchi*	Mone Chiba		
Sena Takahashi*	Wakaba Higuchi		
Tatsuya Tsuboi	Marin Honda		
Kazuki Tomono	Rino Matsuike		
Rio Nakata*	Mai Mihara		
Shunsuke Nakamura*	Saki Miyake		
Taiga Nishino*	Haruna Murakami*		
Kazuki Hasegawa	Mako Yamashita		
Lucas Tsuyoshi Honda	Kinayu Yokoi*		
Kao Miura	Hana Yoshida		
Sena Miyake	Rinka Watanabe		
Sōta Yamamoto			
Nozomu Yoshioka

=== Junior ===
The top eight finishers at the Japan Junior Championships in men's and women's singles were added to the Japan Championships.

	Men	Women
1	Shunsuke Nakamura	Mao Shimada
2	Rio Nakata	Ikura Kushida
3	Tsudoi Suto	Rena Uezono
4	Haru Kakiuchi	Yo Takagi
5	Taiga Nishino	Ayumi Shibayama
6	Seigo Tauchi	Haruna Murakami
7	Daiya Ebihara	Kinayu Yokoi
8	Sena Takahashi	

=== Changes to preliminary entries ===
Date	Discipline	Withdrew	Added	Reason/Other notes	Refs
December 11	Pairs	Riku Miura / Ryuichi Kihara	N/A	Injury (Kihara)	

== Results ==
=== Men ===
Rank	Name	Total points	SP		FS	
1	Shoma Uno	298.04	1	104.69	2	193.35
2	Yuma Kagiyama	292.10	3	93.94	1	198.16
3	Sōta Yamamoto	287.00	2	94.58	3	192.42
4	Kao Miura	280.08	4	93.91	4	186.17
5	Shun Sato	273.04	5	89.80	6	183.24
6	Kazuki Tomono	271.52	6	86.88	5	184.64
7	Tatsuya Tsuboi	252.34	7	85.85	7	166.49
8	Nozomu Yoshioka	249.38	8	85.27	8	164.11
9	Sena Miyake	226.12	10	77.16	9	148.96
10	Lucas Tsuyoshi Honda	217.62	14	73.58	10	144.04
11	Koshiro Shimada	215.97	11	76.57	12	139.40
12	Takeru Amine Kataise	212.26	18	70.41	11	141.85
13	Haruya Sasaki	208.87	17	70.88	13	137.99
14	Shunsuke Nakamura	207.70	9	80.16	19	127.54
15	Kazuki Kushida	204.27	12	75.54	18	128.73
16	Takumi Sugiyama	202.64	15	71.68	16	130.96
17	Rio Nakata	200.27	16	71.45	17	128.82
18	Haru Kakiuchi	196.30	21	64.58	14	131.72
19	Daiya Ebihara	192.96	24	61.85	15	131.11
20	Sena Takahashi	191.77	19	68.28	22	123.49
21	Seigo Tauchi	190.01	23	63.89	20	126.12
22	Kosho Oshima	189.36	20	66.89	23	122.47
23	Yuto Kishina	188.12	22	64.52	21	123.60
WD	Tsudoi Suto	withdrew	13	74.61	withdrew from competition	
Did not advance to free skating
25	Kazuki Hasegawa	59.25	25	59.25	—N/a	
26	Keisuke Kadowaki	59.14	26	59.14	—N/a	
27	Sakura Odagaki	54.55	27	54.55	—N/a	
28	Ryota Kitamura	54.24	28	54.24	—N/a	
29	Minato Shiga	51.60	29	51.60	—N/a	
30	Taiga Nishino	50.77	30	50.77	—N/a	

=== Women ===
Rank	Name	Total points	SP		FS	
1	Kaori Sakamoto	233.12	1	78.78	1	154.34
2	Mone Chiba	209.27	3	68.02	2	141.25
3	Mao Shimada	202.18	7	65.23	3	136.95
4	Rena Uezono	200.69	6	66.22	4	134.47
5	Mai Mihara	199.56	4	67.70	5	131.86
6	Rinka Watanabe	194.88	8	63.66	7	131.22
7	Hana Yoshida	194.22	9	62.73	6	131.49
8	Mako Yamashita	192.15	2	69.92	12	122.23
9	Yuna Aoki	192.01	11	61.44	8	130.57
10	Rion Sumiyoshi	185.22	17	56.70	9	128.52
11	Maria Egawa	184.65	13	58.55	10	126.10
12	Wakaba Higuchi	180.67	15	57.97	11	122.70
13	Mana Kawabe	179.71	5	67.25	18	112.46
14	Kinayu Yokoi	175.80	10	62.49	16	113.31
15	Ayumi Shibayama	175.72	16	57.43	13	118.29
16	Saki Miyake	175.06	14	58.23	14	116.83
17	Rino Matsuike	174.34	12	58.97	15	115.37
18	Sae Shimizu	169.12	18	56.24	17	112.88
19	Haruna Murakami	158.86	23	53.13	19	105.73
20	Natsu Suzuki	155.67	19	56.00	20	99.67
21	Miyabi Oba	150.03	24	50.80	21	99.23
22	Yuna Shiraiwa	148.63	22	53.42	22	95.21
23	Yo Takagi	148.39	20	55.09	23	93.30
24	Maaya Ishida	142.88	21	54.12	24	88.76
Did not advance to free skating
25	Ikura Kushida	50.20	25	50.20	—N/a	
26	Chikako Saigusa	50.19	26	50.19	—N/a	
27	Nana Araki	46.45	27	46.45	—N/a	
28	Marin Honda	44.42	28	44.42	—N/a	

=== Pairs ===
Rank	Name	Total points	SP		FS	
1	Yuna Nagaoka / Sumitada Moriguchi	173.64	1	56.07	1	117.57

=== Ice dance ===
Rank	Name	Total points	RD		FD	
1	Misato Komatsubara / Tim Koleto	178.39	2	70.89	2	107.50
2	Azusa Tanaka / Shingo Nishiyama	176.43	1	71.08	3	105.35
3	Utana Yoshida / Masaya Morita	173.17	3	64.00	1	109.17
4	Ayano Sasaki / Yoshimitsu Ikeda	129.40	4	51.47	4	77.93
5	Akari Kinoshita / Takahiko Tamura	124.86	5	47.30	5	77.56
6	Yuri Kunimura / Kaiji Sakabe	107.08	6	40.71	6	66.37

== Japan Junior Figure Skating Championships ==
The 2023–24 Japan Junior Figure Skating Championships were held in Ōtsu, Shiga from November 17–19, 2023. The national champions in men's and women's singles earned automatic berths on the 2024 World Junior Championships and 2024 Youth Olympics teams. Top finishers in men's and women's singles were invited to compete at the senior Japan Championships in December.

=== Entries ===
A list of preliminary entries was published on November 12, 2023. Names with an asterisk (*) denote novice skaters.

Men	Women	Pairs	Ice dance
Shuntaro Asaga	Yurika Imazeki	Sae Shimizu / Lucas Tsuyoshi Honda	Sara Kishimoto / Atsuhiko Tamura
Taichi Isowa	Miyu Irie		Kaho Yamashita / Yuto Nagata
Daiya Ebihara	Aiko Iwamoto		
Kenta Omura	Rena Uezono		
Hayato Okazaki*	Saho Otake*		
Ibuki Ogahara	Koko Otsubo		
Nobuyoshi Oda	Mayuko Oka		
Haru Kakiuchi	Mei Okada		
Kairi Kato	Yurina Okuno		
Ryusei Kikuchi	Sumika Kanazawa*		
Tomoki Kimura	Miyu Kitatani		
Shioh Kojima	Kanade Kitami		
Kazuna Satou	Ikura Kushida		
Tsudoi Suto	Riria Kono*		
Seigo Tauchi	Mira Shigeta		
Sena Takahashi	Ayumi Shibayama		
Rio Nakata	Mao Shimada		
Shunsuke Nakamura	Nana Sugiyama		
Kazuhiro Nakura	Hono Segawa		
Taiga Nishino	Yo Takagi		
Hiroto Hanai	Nanako Takahara		
Iori Horino	Minoka Chiba		
Haruki Matsumoto*	Ami Nakai		
Masaya Mishima	Ayumi Nakao		
Kei Mukaino	Hikari Matsunami*		
Ryoto Mori	Ruka Miyamoto		
Ryoga Morimoto	Haruna Murakami		
Ryushin Yamada	Kei Yamada		
Sakutaro Yoshino*	Kinayu Yokoi		
	Kaoruko Wada		

==== Novice ====
Top finishers at the Japan Novice Championships in men's and women's singles were added to the Japan Junior Championships.

	Men	Women
1	Hayato Okazaki	Sumika Kanazawa
2	Sakutaro Yoshino	Riria Kono
3	Haruki Matsumoto	Saho Otake
4		Hikari Matsunami

=== Results ===
==== Junior men ====
Rank	Name	Total points	SP		FS	
1	Shunsuke Nakamura	212.42	1	76.81	2	135.61
2	Rio Nakata	205.76	5	64.28	1	141.48
3	Tsudoi Suto	201.12	2	70.59	4	130.53
4	Haru Kakiuchi	197.97	3	68.64	5	129.33
5	Taiga Nishino	195.71	8	63.52	3	132.19
6	Seigo Tauchi	195.19	4	66.24	6	128.95
7	Daiya Ebihara	189.39	6	64.24	10	125.15
8	Sena Takahashi	188.98	9	62.93	7	126.05
9	Ryoga Morimoto	188.86	7	63.58	9	125.28
10	Shuntaro Asaga	178.80	22	52.85	8	125.95
11	Ryusei Kikuchi	177.55	13	60.01	11	117.54
12	Ryushin Yamada	175.09	14	59.84	12	115.25
13	Kazuhiro Nakura	173.08	10	61.01	13	112.07
14	Ryoto Mori	172.45	11	60.80	14	111.65
15	Masaya Mishima	171.40	12	60.70	15	110.70
16	Nobuyoshi Oda	167.13	15	58.31	18	108.82
17	Hayato Okazaki	167.09	16	58.28	19	108.81
18	Ibuki Ogahara	166.95	18	57.57	17	109.38
19	Hiroto Hanai	164.14	21	53.97	16	110.17
20	Kairi Kato	162.52	17	58.26	21	104.26
21	Iori Horino	157.29	20	54.10	22	103.19
22	Kenta Omura	157.08	23	52.66	20	104.42
23	Shioh Kojima	143.81	24	52.33	23	91.48
24	Kazuna Satou	142.14	19	56.53	24	85.61
Did not advance to free skating
25	Tomoki Kimura	51.06	25	51.06	—N/a	
26	Kei Mukaino	49.42	26	49.42	—N/a	
27	Sakutaro Yoshino	48.94	27	48.94	—N/a	
28	Haruki Matsumoto	47.94	28	47.94	—N/a	
29	Taichi Isowa	46.72	29	46.72	—N/a	

==== Junior women ====
Rank	Name	Total points	SP		FS	
1	Mao Shimada	201.33	4	63.34	1	137.99
2	Ikura Kushida	190.12	1	65.30	3	124.82
3	Rena Uezono	186.51	6	60.95	2	125.56
4	Yo Takagi	183.96	3	63.62	4	120.34
5	Ayumi Shibayama	175.61	2	63.68	5	111.93
6	Haruna Murakami	168.48	5	62.30	8	106.18
7	Riria Kono	167.18	11	57.70	6	109.48
8	Kinayu Yokoi	166.08	9	60.00	9	106.08
9	Mayuko Oka	163.71	8	60.04	12	103.67
10	Ami Nakai	160.89	14	55.06	10	105.83
11	Kei Yamada	159.94	12	56.78	13	103.16
12	Sumika Kanazawa	158.77	19	50.21	7	108.56
13	Kaoruko Wada	157.87	7	60.26	15	97.61
14	Mei Okada	152.99	16	51.41	14	101.58
15	Saho Otake	152.64	24	47.09	11	105.55
16	Ayumi Nakao	151.22	13	56.49	17	94.73
17	Yurina Okuno	148.27	10	58.74	21	89.53
18	Hikari Matsunami	145.41	22	48.39	16	97.02
19	Nana Sugiyama	144.91	17	51.37	18	93.54
20	Aiko Iwamoto	143.30	15	51.74	19	91.56
21	Minoka Chiba	138.43	23	47.39	20	91.04
22	Yurika Imazeki	134.13	18	51.17	23	82.96
23	Ruka Miyamoto	132.19	21	48.90	22	83.29
24	Koko Otsubo	130.91	20	49.14	24	81.77
Did not advance to free skating
25	Mira Shigeta	46.81	25	46.81	—N/a	
26	Miyu Kitatani	46.81	26	46.81	—N/a	
27	Hono Segawa	43.88	27	43.88	—N/a	
28	Kanade Kitami	40.84	28	40.84	—N/a	
29	Miyu Irie	39.91	29	39.91	—N/a	
30	Nanako Takahara	36.63	30	36.63	—N/a	

==== Junior pairs ====
Rank	Name	Total points	SP		FS	
1	Sae Shimizu / Lucas Tsuyoshi Honda	109.69	1	40.00	1	69.69

==== Junior ice dance ====
Rank	Name	Total points	RD		FD	
1	Sara Kishimoto / Atsuhiko Tamura	147.45	1	59.06	1	88.39
2	Kaho Yamashita / Yuto Nagata	131.33	2	50.91	2	80.42

== International team selections ==
=== Winter Youth Olympics Games ===
The 2024 Winter Youth Olympics Games were held in Gangwon, South Korea from 27 January to 1 February, 2024.

	Men	Women
1	Haru Kakiuchi	Mao Shimada
2	Rio Nakata	Yo Takagi
1st alt.	Taiga Nishino	Ikura Kushida
2nd alt.	Tsudoi Suto	Ayumi Shibayama

=== Four Continents Championships ===
The 2024 Four Continents Championships were held in Shanghai, China from January 30 to February 4, 2024.

	Men	Women	Pairs	Ice dance
1	Yuma Kagiyama	Mone Chiba	Riku Miura / Ryuichi Kihara	Misato Komatsubara / Tim Koleto
2	Sōta Yamamoto	Mai Mihara		Azusa Tanaka / Shingo Nishiyama
3	Shun Sato	Rinka Watanabe		Utana Yoshida / Masaya Morita
1st alt.	Kazuki Tomono	Hana Yoshida		
2nd alt.	Tatsuya Tsuboi	Yuna Aoki		
3rd alt.	Nozomu Yoshioka	Rion Sumiyoshi		

=== World Junior Championships ===
Commonly referred to as "Junior Worlds", the 2024 World Junior Championships were held in Taipei City, Chinese Taipei from February 26 – March 3, 2024.

	Men	Women	Pairs	Ice dance
1	Shunsuke Nakamura	Mao Shimada	Sae Shimizu / Lucas Tsuyoshi Honda	Sara Kishimoto / Atsuhiko Tamura
2	Rio Nakata	Rena Uezono		
3	Haru Kakiuchi	Ikura Kushida		
1st alt.	Daiya Ebihara	Yo Takagi		Kaho Yamashita / Yuto Nagata
2nd alt.	Seigo Tauchi	Ayumi Shibayama		

=== World Championships ===
The 2024 World Championships were held in Montreal, Canada from March 18–24, 2024.

	Men	Women	Pairs	Ice dance
1	Shoma Uno	Kaori Sakamoto	Riku Miura / Ryuichi Kihara	Misato Komatsubara / Tim Koleto
2	Yuma Kagiyama	Mone Chiba	Yuna Nagaoka / Sumitada Moriguchi	
3	Kao Miura	Hana Yoshida		
1st alt.	Sōta Yamamoto	Mai Mihara		Utana Yoshida / Masaya Morita
2nd alt.	Shun Sato	Rinka Watanabe		
3rd alt.	Kazuki Tomono	Rion Sumiyoshi		
