= Takeru Amine Kataise =

Japanese figure skater

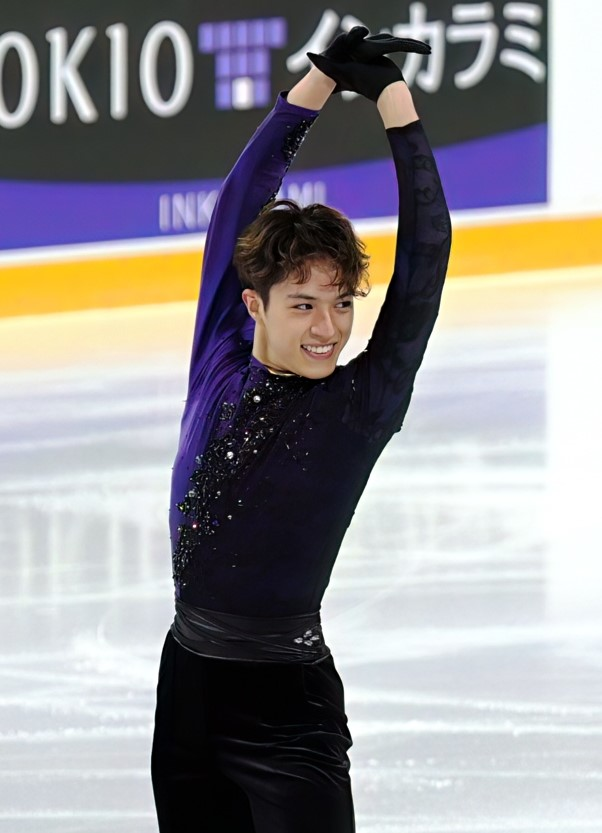
- Kataise at the 2023 Grand Prix de France

Personal information
- Native name: 片伊勢武アミン
- Born: February 8, 2004 (age 22) Shimane, Japan
- Home town: Hyōgo, Japan
- Height: 1.68 m (5 ft 6 in)

Figure skating career
- Country: Japan
- Coach: Koshin Yamada
- Skating club: Kansai University
- Began skating: 2011

Takeru Amine Kataise (片伊勢武アミン, Kataise Takeru Amin; born February 8, 2004) is a Japanese figure skater. He is the 2022 Egna Trophy Junior champion, the 2022 Junior Grand Prix Poland II champion, the 2022 Junior Grand Prix Italy bronze medalist, and the 2022 Japanese Junior national silver medalist.

== Personal life ==
Kataise was born on February 8, 2004, in Shimane, Japan. He enjoys travelling and watching movies. He graduated from Kansai University Senior High School, and he attends Kansai University as of 2022, studying law.

He was inspired to begin skating after watching Mao Asada on the television during his first year of elementary school. He also idolises Jason Brown.

Prior to the 2022–23 figure skating season he competed as Takeru Kataise. Henceforth, he has included his middle name in competition, saying he felt he has "finally been able to express himself" and that it was a "fresh start". His middle name is Arabic, meaning "honest, sincere" and comes from his father's background.

== Career ==
=== Early years ===
Kataise began skating in 2011. He made his international debut at the 2017 Coupe du Printemps, winning in the Novice category. He placed second at the 2017 Japan Novice A Championships, behind Shun Sato.

He performed at the annual touring ice show The Ice in 2014 and 2016.

=== 2021–22 season ===
Kataise began the season competing in the Kinki Regional Championships. He placed third in the short program, but fell to fifth in the free skate, placing fourth overall, qualifying for the Western Sectional Championship, where he placed 2nd in both the short program and free skate, and placed 2nd overall, behind Tatsuya Tsuboi. He qualified to compete at the 2021–22 Japan Junior Championships, where he placed third after the short program despite a fall on his triple Axel. However, he later popped his opening triple Axel in his free skate into a single and lost points in the grade of execution on multiple jumps, and he placed fourth overall in the competition.

He was selected to compete at the 2021–22 Japan Senior Championships for the first time. In the short program, he fell on his triple Lutz, which was intended to be part of a combination, and added a double toe loop to his triple flip later in the program instead. In the free skate, he popped his opening triple Axel into a double Axel, which received a downgrade; he also made the same mistake on his final triple Salchow. He placed 14th overall, with a score of 199.65.

Kataise was sent to compete at the 2022 Egna Trophy, where he made his international junior debut. He scored 82.94 in the short program, breaking the 80 point barrier for the first time, and he received level fours on all of his spins and his step sequence. He fell on his opening triple Axel in the free skate, but came back with a triple Axel-triple toe loop combination. He scored 143.20 points and a total of 226.14 overall; it was the first time he scored over 220 points in his career.

=== 2022–23 season ===
Kataise was assigned to compete at the 2022 Junior Grand Prix Armenian Cup and the 2022 Junior Grand Prix Egna/Neumarkt. However, after the cancellation of the Armenia Cup due to the Armenia-Azerbaijan crisis, he was reassigned to compete at the second stage of the Junior Grand Prix in Poland instead.

He made his ISU Junior Grand Prix debut at the 2022 ISU Baltic Cup in Poland. He placed first in the short program with a score of 79.06, receiving multiple fours and a five from a Swiss judge in grade of execution on his opening triple Axel. He later went on to win the free skate after landing two triple Axels, including one in combination with a triple toe loop, and receiving all level fours on his spins, his only mistake being a two-footed landing on his double Axel-triple toe loop combination. He achieved a personal best score of 155.18 in the free skate, and 234.24 overall, breaking the 230 barrier for the first time and winning the competition by over ten points.

He then competed at his second Junior Grand Prix, Egna/Neumarkt in Italy. He had an unsuccessful short program, falling on his opening triple Axel, then turning an intended triple loop into a double, which also resulted in a fall. In the short program, he placed seventh. However, he was able to rise back to podium position after placing 3rd in the free skate, taking the bronze medal behind Lucas Broussard and teammate Shunsuke Nakamura. His placements of first and third on the Junior Grand Prix circuit meant he qualified for the ISU Junior Grand Prix Final in Turin.

Kataise competed at the Japan Western Sectional competition, where he placed second after the short program. He fell to forth in the free skate and placed forth overall. In November, he competed at the 2022–23 Japan Junior Championships, where he achieved a new national junior record in the short program of 83.27. He had an unsuccessful free skate, in which he placed sixth; however, his almost twelve point lead from the short program placed him second overall, and he won his first national junior medal.

In December, Kataise competed at the 2022–23 Junior Grand Prix Final, coming into the competition with the highest free skating and highest total score received on the Junior Grand Prix circuit that season. He fell on his opening triple Axel in the short program, hitting the boards, then fell a second time on his triple Lutz. He was unable to complete the mandatory jump combination for the short program and placed sixth.

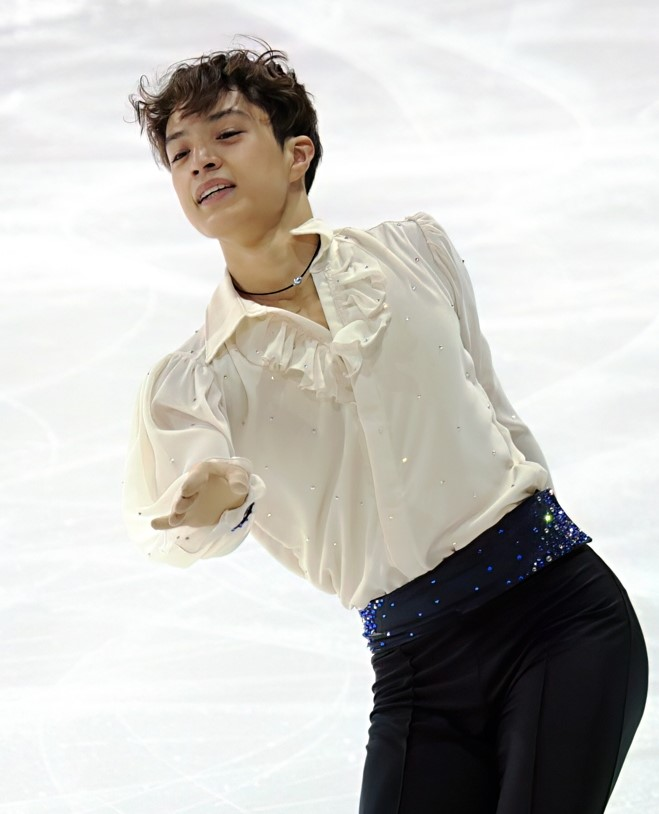
Kataise performing his free program at the 2023 Grand Prix de France

In the free skate, he was able to land both of his triple Axels; however, multiple mistakes later in the program led him to place fifth in the free skate and sixth overall, with a total score of 182.49.

Kataise was invited to compete at the 2022–23 Japan Senior Championships. He stepped out of his triple Axel in the short program and was only able to add a double toe loop to his triple Lutz later on in the program; he placed fourteenth with a score of 70.05. He fell to twenty-first in the free skate and placed nineteenth overall.

Kataise competed at the 2023 Coupe du Printemps in Luxembourg. He placed fifth in the short program and free skate and fifth overall, with a total score of 183.33.

=== 2023–24 season ===
Beginning the season by making his senior Grand Prix debut at the 2023 Grand Prix de France, Kataise would finish twelfth at the event. He would follow this up with another twelfth-place finish at the 2023–24 Japan Senior Championships.

=== 2024–25 season ===
Kataise competed at the 2024–25 Japan Senior Championships, where he finished thirteenth.

=== 2025–26 season ===
At the 2025–26 Japan Championships, Kataise finished the event in ninth place.

== Programs ==
Competition and exhibition programs by season
Season	Short program	Free skate program	Exhibition program
2025–26	Clair de lune: Composed by Claude Debussy; choreo. by Satoko Miyahara	Bring Him Home: From Les Misérables; Composed by Claude-Michel Schönberg; Performed by Josh Groban; choreo. by Akiko Suzuki	
2024–25	Adiós Nonino: Composed by Astor Piazzolla; Performed by Lisandro Adrover; choreo. by Noriko Sato	Tree of Life Suite: Composed by Roberto Cacciapaglia; choreo. by Akiko Suzuki	
2023–24	Adiós Nonino: Composed by Astor Piazzolla; Performed by Lisandro Adrover; choreo. by Noriko Sato	Tree of Life Suite: Composed by Roberto Cacciapaglia; choreo. by Akiko Suzuki	
2022–23	"Densetsu, soshite shinwa e" (main theme) (伝説、そして神話へ, lit. 'From legend to myth'): From Yoshitsune (2005 Taiga Drama); Composed by Taro Iwashiro; choreo. by Kohei Yoshino	Introduction and Rondo Capriccioso: Composed by Camille Saint-Saëns; Performed by Yuna Shinohara, Tomoki Sakata; choreo. by Kenji Miyamoto	The Legend of 1900
2021–22	"Densetsu, soshite shinwa e" (main theme) (伝説、そして神話へ, lit. 'From legend to myth'): From Yoshitsune (2005 Taiga Drama); Composed by Taro Iwashiro; choreo. by Kohei Yoshino	"I Want to Spend My Lifetime Loving You": From The Mask of Zorro; Performed by Marc Anthony, Tina Arena; choreo. by Kohei Yoshino	
2020–21	The Legend of 1900 choreo. by Kohei Yoshino: Composed by Ennio Morricone; Tracks used: 1. "The Crisis"; 2. "1900's Theme"	"I Want to Spend My Lifetime Loving You": From The Mask of Zorro; Performed by Marc Anthony, Tina Arena; choreo. by Kohei Yoshino	
2019–20	The Legend of 1900 choreo. by Kohei Yoshino: Composed by Ennio Morricone; Tracks used: 1. "The Crisis"; 2. "1900's Theme"		
2018–19	The Addams Family choreo. by Masahiro Kawagoe	Don Quixote: Composed by Ludwig Minkus; choreo. by Stephane Lambiel	
2017–18	The Addams Family choreo. by Masahiro Kawagoe	Don Quixote: Composed by Ludwig Minkus; choreo. by Stephane Lambiel	
2016–17	The Addams Family choreo. by Masahiro Kawagoe	The Mask of Zorro	

== Competitive highlights ==
- GP – Event of the ISU Grand Prix Series
- JGP – Event of the ISU Junior Grand Prix Series
- CS – Event of the ISU Challenger Series
- C – Event was cancelled
- Medals at team events are awarded for the team results only. Individual placements at team events are listed in parentheses.

Competition placements at senior level
Season	2021–22	2022–23	2023–24	2024–25	2025–26
Japan Championships	14th	19th	12th	13th	9th
GP France			12th		
Coupe du Printemps		5th			

Competition placements at junior level
Season	2017–18	2018–19	2019–20	2020–21	2021–22	2022–23
Junior Grand Prix Final						6th
Japan Championships	10th	10th	10th	10th	4th	2nd
JGP Italy						3rd
JGP Poland						1st
Egna Trophy					1st	

== Detailed results ==
Current personal best scores are highlighted in bold.

=== Senior level ===
Results in the 2025–26 season
Date	Event	SP		FS		Total	
Date	Event	P	Score	P	Score	P	Score
Dec 18–21, 2025	2025–26 Japan Championships	7	78.40	12	134.76	9	213.16

2024–25 season
Date	Event	SP	FS	Total
December 19–22, 2024	2024–25 Japan Championships	10; 75.62	11; 137.16	13; 212.78
2023–24 season
Date	Event	SP	FS	Total
December 20–24, 2023	2023–24 Japan Championships	18; 70.41	11; 141.85	12; 212.26
November 3–5, 2023	2023 Grand Prix de France	10; 76.27	12; 136.48	12; 212.75

=== Junior level ===
2022–23 season
Date	Event	Level	SP	FS	Total
March 17–19, 2023	2023 Coupe du Printemps	Senior	5; 63.28	5; 120.05	5; 183.33
December 21–25, 2022	2022–23 Japan Championships	Senior	14; 70.05	21; 115.35	19; 185.40
December 8–11, 2022	2022–23 JGP Final	Junior	6; 58.19	5; 124.30	6; 182.49
November 25–27, 2022	2022–23 Japan Junior Championships	Junior	1; 83.27	6; 124.95	2; 208.22
Oct. 11–15, 2022	2022 JGP Egna/Neumarkt	Junior	7; 65.56	3; 135.79	3; 201.35
Oct. 5–8, 2022	2022 JGP Baltic Cup	Junior	1; **79.06**	1; **155.18**	1; **234.24**
2021–22 season
Date	Event	Level	SP	FS	Total
April 7–10, 2022	2022 Egna Trophy	Junior	1; 82.94	1; 143.20	1; 226.14
Dec. 22–26, 2021	2021–22 Japan Championships	Senior	16; 69.32	14; 130.33	14; 199.65
November 19–21, 2021	2021–22 Japan Junior Championships	Junior	3; 67.99	4; 120.38	4; 188.37
**2020–21 season**
Date	Event	Level	SP	FS	Total
November 21–23, 2020	2020–21 Japan Junior Championships	Junior	7; 67.19	11; 104.92	10; 172.11
**2019–20 season**
Date	Event	Level	SP	FS	Total
November 15–17, 2019	2019–20 Japan Junior Championships	Junior	14; 59.08	7; 116.04	10; 175.12
**2018–19 season**
Date	Event	Level	SP	FS	Total
November 23–25, 2018	2018–19 Japan Junior Championships	Junior	9; 61.87	10; 101.69	10; 163.56
**2017–18 season**
Date	Event	Level	SP	FS	Total
November 24–26, 2017	2017–18 Japan Junior Championships	Junior	12; 58.68	9; 112.19	10; 170.87
**2016–17 season**
Date	Event	Level	SP	FS	Total
March 10–12, 2017	2017 Coupe de Printemps	Advanced Novice	1; 44.52	1; 85.89	1; 130.41
November 18–20, 2016	2016–17 Japan Junior Championships	Junior	22; 45.73	19; 95.93	21; 141.66
