= 2025–26 Japan Figure Skating Championships =

Figure skating competition

2025-26 Japan Figure Skating Championships
- Type: National championship
- Date: December 18–21, 2025 (S); November 22–24, 2025 (J)
- Season: 2025–26
- Location: Shibuya, Tokyo (S); Kōtō, Tokyo (J)
- Host: Japan Skating Federation
- Venue: Yoyogi National Gymnasium (S); Tokyo Tatsumi Ice Arena (J)

Champions
- Men's singles: Yuma Kagiyama (S); Rio Nakata (J)
- Women's singles: Kaori Sakamoto (S); Mao Shimada (J)
- Pairs: Yuna Nagaoka / Sumitada Moriguchi (S)
- Ice dance: Utana Yoshida / Masaya Morita (S); Kaho Yamashita / Yuto Nagata (J)
- Previous: 2024-25 Japan Championships
- Next: 2026-27 Japan Championships

The 2025–26 Japan Figure Skating Championships were held in Shibuya, Tokyo on December 18–21, 2025. It was the 94th edition of the event. Medals were awarded in the disciplines of men's singles, women's singles, pairs, and ice dance. The results were part of the Japanese selection criteria for the 2026 Four Continents Championships, 2026 World Championships, and the 2026 Winter Olympics.

== Qualifying ==
Competitors either qualified at regional and sectional competitions, held from September to November 2025, or earned a bye.

Date	Event	Type	Location	Results
September 18–21, 2025	Tokyo	Regional	Kōtō, Tokyo	Details
September 19–21, 2025	Chubu	Regional	Nagoya, Aichi	Details
September 25–28, 2025	Kanto	Regional	Kōfu, Yamanashi	Details
September 26–28, 2025	Kinki	Regional	Hachinohe, Aomori	Details
October 4–6, 2024	Tohoku-Hokkaido	Regional	Sapporo, Hokkaido	Details
October 2–5, 2025	Chu-Shikoku-Kyushu	Regional	Fukuoka, Fukuoka	Details
October 17–19, 2025	Japan Novice Championships	Final	Yokohama, Kanagawa	Details
October 23–26, 2025	Eastern Section	Sectional	Hitachinaka, Ibaraki	Details
October 31 – November 3, 2025	Western Section	Sectional	Ōtsu, Shiga	Details
November 22–24, 2025	Japan Junior Championships	Final	Kōtō, Tokyo	Details
December 18–21, 2025	Japan Championships	Final	Shibuya, Tokyo	Details

== Medal summary ==
=== Senior ===
Discipline	Gold	Silver	Bronze
Men	Yuma Kagiyama	Shun Sato	Kao Miura
Women	Kaori Sakamoto	Mao Shimada	Mone Chiba
Pairs	Yuna Nagaoka; Sumitada Moriguchi	Ayumi Kagotani; Lucas Tsuyoshi Honda	No other competitors
Ice dance	Utana Yoshida; Masaya Morita	Ikura Kushida; Koshiro Shimada	Ayano Sasaki; Yoshimitsu Ikeda

=== Junior ===
Discipline	Gold	Silver	Bronze
Men	Rio Nakata	Taiga Nishino	Daiya Ebihara
Women	Mao Shimada	Mayuko Oka	Mei Okada
Ice dance	Kaho Yamashita; Yuto Nagata	Ayumi Shibayama; Tomoki Kimura	Sumire Yoshida; Ibuki Ogahara

== Entries ==
Names with an asterisk (*) denote junior skaters.

Men	Women	Pairs	Ice dance
Yuma Kagiyama	Kaori Sakamoto	Riku Miura; Ryuichi Kihara	Utana Yoshida; Masaya Morita
Rio Nakata*	Mao Shimada*	Yuna Nagaoka; Sumitada Moriguchi	Ikura Kushida; Koshiro Shimada
Tatsuya Tsuboi	Wakaba Higuchi	Ayumi Kagotani; Lucas Tsuyoshi Honda	Ayano Sasaki; Yoshimitsu Ikeda
Kao Miura	Rion Sumiyoshi	—N/a	Rika Kihira; Shingo Nishiyama
Shun Sato	Ami Nakai	—N/a	Chisato Uramatsu; Atsuhiko Tamura
Nozomu Yoshioka	Rinka Watanabe	—N/a	Haruno Yajima; Tsukasa Yajima
Sena Miyake	Mone Chiba	—N/a	—N/a
Kosho Oshima	Yuna Aoki	—N/a	—N/a
Haruto Toda	Maria Egawa	—N/a	—N/a
Shio Kojima	Mana Kawabe	—N/a	—N/a
Sōta Yamamoto	Chikako Saigusa	—N/a	—N/a
Kazuki Tomono	Rino Matsuike	—N/a	—N/a
Haru Kakiuchi	Hana Yoshida	—N/a	—N/a
Takumi Sugiyama	Saki Miyake	—N/a	—N/a
Shunsuke Nakamura	Mako Yamashita	—N/a	—N/a
Takeru Amine Kataise	Mai Mihara	—N/a	—N/a
Keisuke Kadowaki	Sae Shimizu	—N/a	—N/a
Ryoga Morimoto	Haruna Iwasaki	—N/a	—N/a
Shuntaro Asaga	Miyabi Oba	—N/a	—N/a
Yuto Kishina	Mia Mori	—N/a	—N/a
Shunya Matsuoka	Arisa Kamoi	—N/a	—N/a
Daiya Ebihara*	Mayuko Oka*	—N/a	—N/a
Ibuki Ogahara*	Mei Okada*	—N/a	—N/a
Tsudoi Suto*	Sumika Kanazawa*	—N/a	—N/a
Sena Takahashi*	Ikura Kushida*	—N/a	—N/a
Taiga Nishino*	Haruna Murakami*	—N/a	—N/a
Ryoto Mori*	Kei Yamada*	—N/a	—N/a
Hayato Okazaki*	Kaoruko Wada*	—N/a	—N/a
Shun Uemura*	Saikki Ikkanda*	—N/a	—N/a
Yujin Takeda*	Yo Takagi*	—N/a	—N/a

== Results ==
=== Men ===
Men's results
Rank	Name	Total points	SP		FS	
1	Yuma Kagiyama	287.95	1	104.27	2	183.68
2	Shun Sato	276.75	5	87.99	1	188.76
3	Kao Miura	261.18	2	95.65	3	165.53
4	Rio Nakata	248.65	3	89.91	4	158.74
5	Sōta Yamamoto	238.94	6	82.21	5	156.73
6	Kazuki Tomono	229.74	4	88.05	7	141.69
7	Daiya Ebihara	218.99	16	70.23	6	148.76
8	Nozomu Yoshioka	214.59	9	75.42	10	139.17
9	Takeru Amine Kataise	213.16	7	78.40	12	134.76
10	Kosho Oshima	212.98	12	73.47	9	139.51
11	Taiga Nishino	211.11	17	70.18	8	140.93
12	Tsudoi Suto	210.11	13	71.59	11	138.52
13	Tatsuya Tsuboi	207.43	10	74.52	15	132.91
14	Ryoto Mori	205.44	14	70.91	13	134.53
15	Sena Takahashi	205.44	11	73.82	16	131.62
16	Takumi Sugiyama	202.71	18	69.54	14	133.17
17	Sena Miyake	200.95	8	75.94	20	125.01
18	Haru Kakiuchi	199.56	15	70.68	17	128.88
19	Shunsuke Nakamura	194.10	22	66.96	18	127.14
20	Ryoga Morimoto	193.18	21	67.40	19	125.78
21	Shun Uemura	191.87	20	67.98	21	123.89
22	Yuto Kishina	174.82	23	66.16	22	108.66
23	Yujin Takeda	174.13	24	65.54	23	108.59
24	Shuntaro Asaga	173.62	19	69.48	24	104.14
Did not advance to free skating
25	Shunya Matsuoka	59.39	25	59.39	—N/a	
26	Haruto Toda	58.62	26	58.62	—N/a	
27	Ibuki Ogahara	58.49	27	58.49	—N/a	
28	Keisuke Kadowaki	57.45	28	57.45	—N/a	
29	Shio Kojima	57.29	29	57.29	—N/a	
30	Hayato Okazaki	51.53	30	51.53	—N/a	

=== Women ===
Women's results
Rank	Name	Total points	SP		FS	
1	Kaori Sakamoto	234.36	1	79.43	1	154.93
2	Mao Shimada	228.08	2	79.33	2	148.75
3	Mone Chiba	216.24	4	74.60	4	141.64
4	Ami Nakai	213.56	3	77.50	7	136.06
5	Yuna Aoki	212.00	7	69.84	3	142.16
6	Mayuko Oka	211.73	5	73.20	6	138.53
7	Rinka Watanabe	211.52	6	71.36	5	140.16
8	Wakaba Higuchi	203.06	8	69.47	8	133.59
9	Saki Miyake	195.49	12	62.84	9	132.65
10	Mai Mihara	190.63	13	62.77	11	127.86
11	Rino Matsuike	190.20	16	61.26	10	128.94
12	Mana Kawabe	187.36	10	64.12	14	123.24
13	Maria Egawa	187.29	9	64.76	15	122.53
14	Mei Okada	185.29	18	60.43	12	124.86
15	Mako Yamashita	183.18	11	63.43	16	119.75
16	Sumika Kanazawa	181.67	19	57.09	13	124.58
17	Yo Takagi	179.73	15	61.62	17	118.11
18	Rion Sumiyoshi	173.19	21	56.37	18	116.82
19	Kaoruko Wada	170.90	17	60.82	21	110.08
20	Ikura Kushida	170.86	22	55.47	19	115.39
21	Haruna Murakami	170.79	20	56.84	20	113.95
22	Kei Yamada	158.23	14	62.31	23	95.92
23	Arisa Kamoi	149.82	23	53.16	22	96.66
24	Haruna Iwasaki	145.35	24	53.13	24	92.22
Did not advance to free skating
25	Miyabi Oba	51.79	25	51.79	—N/a	
26	Chikako Saigusa	51.46	26	51.46	—N/a	
27	Sae Shimizu	51.39	27	51.39	—N/a	
28	Hana Yoshida	49.46	28	49.46	—N/a	
29	Mia Mori	44.13	29	44.13	—N/a	
30	Saikki Ikkanda	42.69	30	42.69	—N/a	

=== Pairs ===
Pairs results
Rank	Name	Total points	SP		FS	
1	Yuna Nagaoka; Sumitada Moriguchi	215.30	2	72.91	1	142.39
2	Ayumi Kagotani; Lucas Tsuyoshi Honda	133.47	3	48.33	2	85.14
WD	Riku Miura; Ryuichi Kihara	withdrew	1	84.91	withdrew from competition	

=== Ice dance ===
Ice dance results
Rank	Name	Total points	RD		FD	
1	Utana Yoshida; Masaya Morita	172.29	1	68.78	1	103.51
2	Ikura Kushida; Koshiro Shimada	165.75	2	64.99	2	100.76
3	Ayano Sasaki; Yoshimitsu Ikeda	146.22	4	54.09	3	92.13
4	Rika Kihira; Shingo Nishiyama	144.41	3	57.44	4	86.97
5	Chisato Uramatsu; Atsuhiko Tamura	131.55	5	50.93	5	80.62

== Japan Junior Figure Skating Championships ==
The 2025–26 Japan Junior Figure Skating Championships were held in Kōtō, Tokyo from November 22–24, 2025. The national champions in men's and women's singles earned automatic berths on the 2026 World Junior Championships. Top finishers in men's and women's singles were invited to compete at the senior Japan Championships in December. Junior ice dance was contested alongside the senior national championships in December.

=== Entries ===
Names with an asterisk (*) denote novice skaters.

Men	Women	Ice dance
Koyama Aoto	Misaki Arimatsu	Ayumi Shibayama; Tomoki Kimura
Daiya Ebihara	Mana Fujiwara	Mizuho Sugimoto; Eisuke Kumano
Hiroto Hanai	Reihime Horiike	Kaho Yamashita; Yuto Nagata
Haruhisa Hidaka*	Aoha Hoshi	Sumire Yoshida; Ibuki Ogawara
Iori Horino	Saori Ikkanda	—N/a
Ryu Ikeda	Aiko Iwamoto	—N/a
Daily Skyler Kaisei*	Sumika Kanazawa	—N/a
Kairi Kato	Reina Kawakatsu	—N/a
Aoichi Kimura*	Kanade Kitami	—N/a
Yuki Matsumoto	Oshin Kudo	—N/a
Masaya Mishima	Ikura Kushida	—N/a
Ryoto Mori	Hikari Matsunami	—N/a
Rio Nakata	Ruka Miyamoto	—N/a
Taiga Nishino	Karin Miyazaki*	—N/a
Oda Nobuyoshi	Narumi Mori*	—N/a
Masato Obayashi	Haruna Murakami	—N/a
Ibuki Ogahara	Keito Nagata	—N/a
Hayato Okazaki	Ayumi Nakao	—N/a
Kenta Omura	Mayuko Oka	—N/a
Riku Sakuma*	Mei Okada	—N/a
Kaito Sano	Asari Reiji	—N/a
Haruto Sasaki	Mao Shimada	—N/a
Kazuna Sato	Yo Takagi	—N/a
Tsudoi Suto	Hana Takasakino	—N/a
Minato Taguchi	Hanae Takeshima*	—N/a
Sena Takahashi	Rena Uezono	—N/a
Yuhito Takeda	Kaoruko Wada	—N/a
Seigo Tauchi	Kei Yamada	—N/a
Shun Uemura	Sumire Yoshida	—N/a
Yuki Yoshioka	Sumire Yoshida	—N/a

==== Novice ====
Top finishers at the Japan Novice Championships in men's and women's singles were added to the Japan Junior Championships.

	Men	Women
1	Riku Sakuma	Karin Miyazaki
2	Haruhisa Hidaka	Hanae Takeshima
3	Aoichi Kimura	Narumi Mori
4	Daily Skyler Kaisei	

=== Results ===
==== Junior men ====
Junior men's results
Rank	Name	Total points	SP		FS	
1	Rio Nakata	255.25	1	84.99	1	170.26
2	Taiga Nishino	235.64	2	79.95	2	155.69
3	Daiya Ebihara	215.90	3	74.22	3	141.68
4	Tsudoi Suto	206.62	5	72.75	5	133.87
5	Sena Takahashi	204.45	8	69.08	4	135.37
6	Ryoto Mori	192.34	6	71.87	7	120.47
7	Ibuki Ogahara	190.98	4	73.18	10	117.80
8	Hayato Okazaki	187.83	7	69.14	9	118.69
9	Shun Uemura	185.03	9	68.68	11	116.35
10	Yuhito Takeda	184.88	10	66.11	8	118.77
11	Seigo Tauchi	183.14	12	61.85	6	121.29
12	Yuki Matsumoto	172.96	14	59.14	12	113.82
13	Iori Horino	171.79	13	60.90	15	110.89
14	Kaito Sano	170.09	15	58.42	14	111.67
15	Riku Sakuma	168.63	19	55.56	13	113.07
16	Kairi Kato	164.98	17	56.71	17	108.27
17	Koyama Aoto	164.54	11	62.12	20	102.42
18	Aoichi Kimura	163.90	20	55.15	16	108.75
19	Minato Taguchi	163.36	16	57.47	18	105.89
20	Masato Obayashi	156.95	22	54.51	19	102.44
21	Hiroto Hanai	152.63	21	55.12	21	97.51
22	Kenta Omura	150.07	24	53.28	22	96.79
23	Ryu Ikeda	149.98	18	56.13	24	93.85
24	Kazuna Sato	149.06	23	53.89	23	95.17
Did not advance to free skating
25	Haruto Sasaki	52.53	25	52.53	—N/a	
26	Daily Skyler Kaisei	51.59	26	51.59	—N/a	
27	Haruhisa Hidaka	51.23	27	51.23	—N/a	
28	Oda Nobuyoshi	50.87	28	50.87	—N/a	
29	Yuki Yoshioka	47.26	29	47.26	—N/a	
30	Masaya Mishima	45.01	30	45.01	—N/a	

==== Junior women ====
Junior women's results
Rank	Name	Total points	SP		FS	
1	Mao Shimada	196.78	1	72.55	2	124.23
2	Mayuko Oka	194.82	8	58.09	1	136.73
3	Mei Okada	188.31	2	65.07	3	123.24
4	Sumika Kanazawa	185.95	4	64.23	5	121.72
5	Karin Miyazaki	183.66	6	61.04	4	122.62
6	Kei Yamada	175.82	9	57.99	6	117.83
7	Ikura Kushida	172.58	3	64.37	11	108.21
8	Haruna Murakami	172.36	7	60.42	8	111.94
9	Kaoruko Wada	171.76	10	55.10	7	116.66
10	Saori Ikkanda	164.15	11	54.34	9	109.81
11	Yo Takagi	160.83	5	61.32	15	99.51
12	Hikari Matsunami	158.60	12	53.65	14	104.95
13	Hanaha Takeshima	158.05	14	52.14	13	105.91
14	Ayumi Nakao	157.86	15	49.65	12	108.21
15	Reina Kawakatsu	156.68	19	47.65	10	109.03
16	Sumire Yoshida	143.64	16	48.13	16	95.51
17	Aoha Hoshi	140.95	18	47.89	17	93.06
18	Asari Reiji	138.02	24	45.37	18	92.65
19	Ruka Miyamoto	131.86	17	48.04	19	83.82
20	Rena Uezono	131.42	13	53.20	23	78.22
21	Misaki Arimatsu	129.95	21	46.62	20	83.33
22	Oshin Kudo	126.83	22	46.47	22	80.36
23	Narumi Mori	126.46	23	45.83	21	80.63
24	Kanade Kitami	118.21	20	46.74	24	71.47
Did not advance to free skating
25	Keito Nagata	41.36	25	41.36	—N/a	
26	Hana Takasakino	38.82	26	38.82	—N/a	
27	Reihime Horiike	38.52	27	38.52	—N/a	
28	Aiko Iwamoto	38.27	28	38.27	—N/a	
29	Mana Fujiwara	35.69	29	35.69	—N/a	

==== Junior ice dance ====
Junior ice dance results
Rank	Name	Total points	RD		FD	
1	Kaho Yamashita; Yuto Nagata	140.20	1	54.42	1	85.78
2	Ayumi Shibayama; Tomoki Kimura	137.64	2	54.33	2	83.31
3	Sumire Yoshida; Ibuki Ogawara	129.25	3	50.86	3	78.39
4	Mizuho Sugimoto; Eisuke Kumano	92.94	4	37.94	4	55.00

== International team selections ==
=== Four Continents Championships ===
The 2026 Four Continents Championships will be held in Beijing, China from January 21-25, 2026.

	Men	Women	Pairs	Ice dance
1	Kao Miura	Mone Chiba	Yuna Nagaoka; Sumitada Moriguchi	Utana Yoshida; Masaya Morita
2	Kazuki Tomono	Ami Nakai		
3	Sōta Yamamoto	Yuna Aoki		
1st alt.	Nozomu Yoshioka	Rinka Watanabe		
2nd alt.	Tatsuya Tsuboi	Wakaba Higuchi		
3rd alt.		Saki Miyake		

=== World Junior Championships ===
Commonly referred to as "Junior Worlds", the 2026 World Junior Championships will be held in Tallinn, Estonia from March 3-8, 2026..

	Men	Women	Ice dance
1	Rio Nakata	Mao Shimada	Kaho Yamashita; Yuto Nagata
2	Taiga Nishino	Mayuko Oka	
3	Daiya Ebihara	Mei Okada	
1st alt.	Sena Takahashi	Sumika Kanazawa	Ayumi Shibayama; Tomoki Kimura
2nd alt.	Ryoto Mori	Yo Takagi	

=== World Championships ===
The 2026 World Championships will be held in Prague, Czech Republic from March 24-29, 2026.

	Men	Women	Pairs	Ice dance
1	Yuma Kagiyama	Kaori Sakamoto	Yuna Nagaoka; Sumitada Moriguchi	Utana Yoshida; Masaya Morita
2	Shun Sato	Ami Nakai	Riku Miura; Ryuichi Kihara	
3	Kao Miura	Mone Chiba		
1st alt.	Kazuki Tomono	Rinka Watanabe		
2nd alt.	Sōta Yamamoto	Yuna Aoki		
3rd alt.	Nozomu Yoshioka			

=== Winter Olympics ===
The 2026 Winter Olympics will be held in Milan, Italy from February 6-19, 2026.

	Men	Women	Pairs	Ice dance
1	Yuma Kagiyama	Kaori Sakamoto	Yuna Nagaoka; Sumitada Moriguchi	Utana Yoshida; Masaya Morita
2	Shun Sato	Ami Nakai	Riku Miura; Ryuichi Kihara	
3	Kao Miura	Mone Chiba		
1st alt.	Kazuki Tomono	Rinka Watanabe		
2nd alt.	Sōta Yamamoto	Yuna Aoki		
3rd alt.	Tatsuya Tsuboi			
