= 2022–23 Japan Figure Skating Championships =

Figure skating competition

- Type: National championship
- Date: December 21–25, 2022 (S); November 25–27, 2022 (J)
- Season: 2022–23
- Location: Kadoma, Osaka (S); Hitachinaka, Ibaraki (J)
- Host: Japan Skating Federation
- Venue: Namihaya Dome (S); Kasamatsu Sports Park (J)

Champions
- Men's singles: Shoma Uno (S); Nozomu Yoshioka (J)
- Women's singles: Kaori Sakamoto (S); Mao Shimada (J)
- Pairs: Haruna Murakami / Sumitada Moriguchi (S); Haruna Murakami / Sumitada Moriguchi (J)
- Ice dance: Kana Muramoto / Daisuke Takahashi (S); Nao Kida / Masaya Morita (J)
- Previous: 2021–22 Japan Championships
- Next: 2023–24 Japan Championships

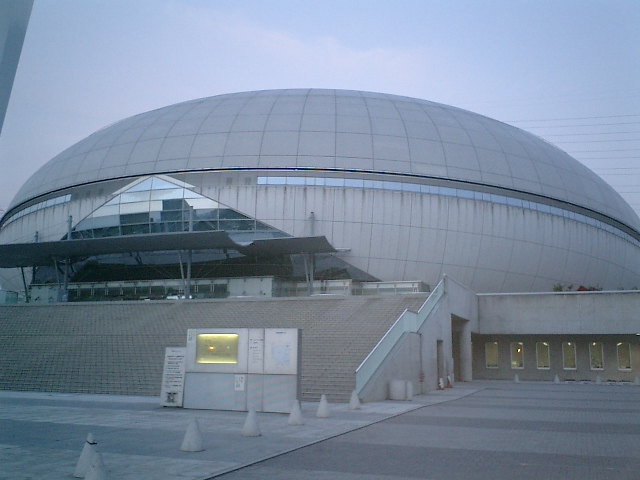

The 2022–23 Japan Figure Skating Championships were held in Kadoma, Osaka on December 21–25, 2022. It was the 91st edition of the event. Medals were awarded in the disciplines of men's singles, women's singles, pairs, and ice dance. The results were part of the Japanese selection criteria for the 2023 Four Continents Championships and the 2023 World Championships.

== Qualifying ==
Competitors either qualified at regional and sectional competitions, held from September to November 2022, or earned a bye.

Date	Event	Type	Location	Results
Sep. 29 – Oct. 2, 2022	Chu-Shikoku-Kyushu	Regional	Okayama, Okayama	Details
Sep. 29 – Oct. 2, 2022	Tokyo	Regional	Nishitōkyō, Tokyo	Details
September 22–25, 2022	Kanto	Regional	Nikkō, Tochigi	Details
September 23–25, 2022	Chubu	Regional	Nagoya, Aichi	Details
October 7–9, 2022	Tohoku-Hokkaido	Regional	Hachinohe, Aomori	Details
October 7–10, 2022	Kinki	Regional	Amagasaki, Hyōgo	Details
October 21–23, 2022	Japan Novice Championships	Final	Sapporo, Hokkaido	Details
October 27–30, 2022	Western Section	Sectional	Kyoto, Kyoto	Details
November 3–6, 2022	Eastern Section	Sectional	Maebashi, Gunma	Details
November 25–27, 2022	Japan Junior Championships	Final	Hitachinaka, Ibaraki	Details
December 21–25, 2022	Japan Championships	Final	Kadoma, Osaka	Details

== Medal summary ==
=== Senior ===
Discipline	Gold	Silver	Bronze
Men	Shoma Uno	Koshiro Shimada	Kazuki Tomono
Women	Kaori Sakamoto	Mai Mihara	Mao Shimada
Pairs	Haruna Murakami / Sumitada Moriguchi	No other competitors	
Ice dance	Kana Muramoto / Daisuke Takahashi	Misato Komatsubara / Tim Koleto	Nicole Takahashi / Shiloh Judd

=== Junior ===
Discipline	Gold	Silver	Bronze
Men	Nozomu Yoshioka	Takeru Amine Kataise	Haruya Sasaki
Women	Mao Shimada	Mone Chiba	Ami Nakai
Pairs	Haruna Murakami / Sumitada Moriguchi	No other competitors	
Ice dance	Nao Kida / Masaya Morita	Sara Kishimoto / Atsuhiko Tamura	Kaho Yamashita / Yuto Nagata

=== Novice ===
Discipline	Gold	Silver	Bronze
Men (Novice A)	Sena Takahashi	Taiga Nishino	Hiroto Hanai
Men (Novice B)	Sakutaro Yoshino	Haruhisa Hidaka	Kosei Yamamoto
Women (Novice A)	Rena Uezono	Mayuko Oka	Ruka Miyamoto
Women (Novice B)	Sumika Kanazawa	Sara Hanai	Aoha Hoshi
Pairs	No competitors		
Ice dance	Sumire Yoshida / Ibuki Ogahara	Haru Matsuzaki / Haruki Motomura	Nanoha Yahata / Yuga Takemasa

== Entries ==
A list of preliminary entries was published on December 6, 2022. Names with an asterisk (*) denote junior skaters.

Men	Women	Pairs	Ice dance
Shoma Uno	Yuna Aoki	~~Riku Miura / Ryuichi Kihara~~ (withdrew)	Saiko Kikuchi / Yoshimitsu Ikeda
Kosho Oshima	Maria Egawa	Haruna Murakami / Sumitada Moriguchi*	Akari Kinoshita / Takahiko Tamura
Haru Kakiuchi*	Miyabi Oba		Misato Komatsubara / Tim Koleto
Yuma Kagiyama	Yurina Okuno*		Nicole Takahashi / Shiloh Judd
Takeru Amine Kataise*	Mana Kawabe		Kana Muramoto / Daisuke Takahashi
Yuto Kishina	Rika Kihira		Haruno Yajima / Tsutomu Matsui
Kazuki Kushida	Ikura Kushida*		
Shun Kobayashi	Chikako Saegusa		
Haruya Sasaki*	Kaori Sakamoto		
Shun Sato	Ibuki Sato		
Koshiro Shimada	Ayumi Shibayama*		
Takumi Sugiyama	Mao Shimada*		
Tsudoi Suto*	Rion Sumiyoshi		
Mitsuki Sumoto	Yo Takagi*		
Seigo Tauchi*	Niina Takeno		
Tatsuya Tsuboi	Hina Takeno		
Kazuki Tomono	Mone Chiba*		
Rio Nakata*	Ami Nakai*		
Shunsuke Nakamura*	Marin Honda		
Shingo Nishiyama	Rino Matsuike		
Kazuki Hasegawa	Akari Matsubara		
Shogo Hikosaka	Mai Mihara		
Lucas Tsuyoshi Honda	Saki Miyake		
Kao Miura	Haruna Murakami*		
Haruki Mishima	Mako Yamashita		
Sena Miyake	Yuhana Yokoi		
Sumitada Moriguchi	Shiika Yoshioka		
Taichiro Yamakuma	Hana Yoshida		
Sōta Yamamoto	Rinka Watanabe		
Nozomu Yoshioka*			

=== Junior ===
The top eight finishers at the Japan Junior Championships in men's and women's singles and one pair team were added to the Japan Championships.

	Men	Women	Pairs
1	Nozomu Yoshioka	Mao Shimada	Haruna Murakami / Sumitada Moriguchi
2	Takeru Amine Kataise	Mone Chiba	
3	Haruya Sasaki	Ami Nakai	
4	Shunsuke Nakamura	Ikura Kushida	
5	Rio Nakata	Ayumi Shibayama	
6	Haru Kakiuchi	Yurina Okuno	
7	Tsudoi Suto	Yo Takagi	
8	Seigo Tauchi	Haruna Murakami	

=== Changes to preliminary entries ===
Date	Discipline	Withdrew	Added	Reason/Other notes	Refs
December 21	Pairs	Riku Miura / Ryuichi Kihara	N/A	Flight delays	

== Results ==
=== Men ===
Rank	Name	Total points	SP		FS	
1	Shoma Uno	291.73	1	100.45	1	191.28
2	Koshiro Shimada	252.56	2	87.69	6	164.87
3	Kazuki Tomono	250.84	4	85.43	4	165.41
4	Shun Sato	249.64	5	81.78	3	167.86
5	Sōta Yamamoto	245.41	3	86.89	7	158.52
6	Kao Miura	242.55	13	71.12	2	171.43
7	Sumitada Moriguchi	241.63	10	76.31	5	165.32
8	Yuma Kagiyama	237.83	6	81.39	8	156.44
9	Tatsuya Tsuboi	221.17	11	74.84	9	146.33
10	Nozomu Yoshioka	220.43	7	80.85	11	139.58
11	Shunsuke Nakamura	218.08	8	77.74	10	140.34
12	Sena Miyake	216.10	9	76.69	12	139.41
13	Taichiro Yamakuma	206.25	12	74.41	15	131.84
14	Kosho Oshima	202.44	16	66.44	13	136.00
15	Haruya Sasaki	199.95	19	64.73	14	135.22
16	Shingo Nishiyama	197.81	17	66.43	16	131.38
17	Tsudoi Suto	190.38	22	61.36	17	129.02
18	Haru Kakiuchi	187.97	21	61.42	18	126.55
19	Takeru Amine Kataise	185.40	14	70.05	21	115.35
20	Kazuki Kushida	181.81	24	59.98	19	121.83
21	Lucas Tsuyoshi Honda	180.87	20	62.48	20	118.39
22	Kazuki Hasegawa	179.61	18	64.94	22	114.67
23	Seigo Tauchi	173.60	15	66.76	24	106.84
24	Mitsuki Sumoto	172.40	23	61.07	23	111.33
Did not advance to free skating
25	Yuto Kishina	58.73	25	58.73	—N/a	
26	Rio Nakata	57.74	26	57.74	—N/a	
27	Takumi Sugiyama	54.28	27	54.28	—N/a	
28	Shogo Hikosaka	49.81	28	49.81	—N/a	
29	Shun Kobayashi	47.37	29	47.37	—N/a	
30	Haruki Mishima	38.87	30	38.87	—N/a	

=== Women ===
Rank	Name	Total points	SP		FS	
1	Kaori Sakamoto	233.05	1	77.79	1	155.26
2	Mai Mihara	219.93	2	74.70	2	145.23
3	Mao Shimada	202.79	4	70.28	5	132.51
4	Ami Nakai	201.49	8	64.07	4	137.42
5	Mone Chiba	200.12	3	71.06	7	129.06
6	Hana Yoshida	197.21	14	59.49	3	137.72
7	Yuna Aoki	191.89	10	62.48	6	129.41
8	Ikura Kushida	190.58	9	63.29	10	127.29
9	Mana Kawabe	190.44	6	64.51	11	125.93
10	Ayumi Shibayama	189.09	7	64.37	12	124.72
11	Rika Kihira	188.62	11	60.43	8	128.19
12	Rinka Watanabe	183.99	18	56.23	9	127.76
13	Rino Matsuike	179.85	20	56.01	13	123.84
14	Rion Sumiyoshi	178.03	17	57.38	14	120.65
15	Saki Miyake	175.38	5	66.29	16	109.09
16	Mako Yamashita	172.96	22	54.98	15	117.98
17	Haruna Murakami	163.76	15	59.23	19	104.53
18	Hina Takeno	163.39	19	56.15	17	107.24
19	Yuhana Yokoi	161.87	12	59.78	20	102.09
20	Miyabi Oba	159.94	13	59.77	21	100.17
21	Yo Takagi	158.86	16	58.87	22	99.99
22	Maria Egawa	158.39	23	52.83	18	105.56
23	Akari Matsubara	152.22	24	52.45	23	99.77
24	Niina Takeno	152.14	21	55.49	24	96.65
Did not advance to free skating
25	Ibuki Sato	52.27	25	52.27	—N/a	
26	Marin Honda	51.81	26	51.81	—N/a	
27	Yurina Okuno	49.29	27	49.29	—N/a	
28	Chikako Saigusa	46.73	28	46.73	—N/a	
29	Shiika Yoshioka	44.75	29	44.75	—N/a	

=== Pairs ===
Rank	Name	Total points	SP		FS	
1	Haruna Murakami / Sumitada Moriguchi	162.07	1	54.21	1	107.86

=== Ice dance ===
Rank	Name	Total points	RD		FD	
1	Kana Muramoto / Daisuke Takahashi	186.61	1	77.70	1	108.91
2	Misato Komatsubara / Tim Koleto	175.10	2	69.96	2	105.41
3	Nicole Takahashi / Shiloh Judd	130.26	3	52.01	4	78.25
4	Akari Kinoshita / Takahiko Tamura	128.69	4	49.72	3	78.97
5	Saiko Kikuchi / Yoshimitsu Ikeda	103.78	6	42.41	5	61.37
6	Haruno Yajima / Tsutomu Matsui	96.44	5	43.63	6	52.81

== Japan Junior Figure Skating Championships ==
The 2022–23 Japan Junior Figure Skating Championships were held in Hitachinaka, Ibaraki from November 25–27, 2022. The national champions in men's and women's singles earned automatic berths on the 2023 World Junior Championships team. Top finishers in men's and women's singles were invited to compete at the senior Japan Championships in December.

=== Entries ===
A list of preliminary entries was published on November 15, 2022. Names with an asterisk (*) denote novice skaters.

Men	Women	Pairs	Ice dance
Shuntaro Asaga	Yurika Imazeki	Haruna Murakami / Sumitada Moriguchi	Sara Kishimoto / Atsuhiko Tamura
Taichi Isowa	Miyu Irie		Nao Kida / Masaya Morita
Daiya Ebihara	Haruna Iwasaki		Nanami Harazawa / Eisuke Kumano
Kenta Omura	Rena Uezono*		Kaho Yamashita / Yuto Nagata
Sakura Odagaki	Mayuko Oka*		
Haru Kakiuchi	Marin Okamoto		
Takeru Amine Kataise	Yurina Okuno		
Ryusei Kikuchi	Arisa Kamoi		
Ryota Kitamura	Ikura Kushida		
Tomoki Kimura	Riria Kono*		
Shio Kojima	Ayumi Shibayama		
Haruya Sasaki	Mao Shimada		
Kazuna Sato	Sae Shimizu		
Rei Suzuki	Nana Sugiyama		
Tsudoi Suto	Hono Segawa		
Seigo Tauchi	Yo Takagi		
Sena Takahashi*	Sakurako Tanabe		
Sora Tarumi	Mone Chiba		
Rio Nakata	Ami Nakai		
Shunsuke Nakamura	Ayumi Nakao		
Kazuhiro Nakura	Yuna Nagaoka		
Taiga Nishino*	Miyu Hanada		
Hiroto Hanai*	Seira Fujinuma		
Hiroto Honda	Noa Hozumi		
Masaya Mishima	Ruka Miyamoto*		
Yota Mihara	Haruna Murakami		
Ryoga Morimoto	Kei Yamada		
Nozomu Yoshioka	Koharu Yunoki		
Yuki Yoshioka	Rei Yoshimoto		
	Kaoruko Wada		

==== Novice ====
Top finishers at the Japan Novice Championships in men's and women's singles were added to the Japan Junior Championships.

	Men	Women
1	Sena Takahashi	Rena Uezono
2	Taiga Nishino	Mayuko Oka
3	Hiroto Hanai	Ruka Miyamoto
4		Riria Kono

=== Results ===
==== Junior men ====
Rank	Name	Total points	SP		FS	
1	Nozomu Yoshioka	209.57	2	71.84	2	137.73
2	Takeru Amine Kataise	208.22	1	83.27	6	124.95
3	Haruya Sasaki	207.96	4	67.31	1	140.65
4	Shunsuke Nakamura	196.92	3	70.28	5	126.64
5	Rio Nakata	190.24	7	63.26	4	126.98
6	Haru Kakiuchi	180.73	6	63.39	10	117.34
7	Tsudoi Suto	179.85	9	60.65	8	119.20
8	Seigo Tauchi	179.25	17	51.77	3	127.48
9	Sena Takahashi	179.16	8	60.79	9	118.37
10	Ryusei Kikuchi	178.03	5	63.92	12	114.11
11	Ryoga Morimoto	177.70	10	57.96	7	119.74
12	Taiga Nishino	170.74	12	56.37	11	114.37
13	Shuntaro Asaga	166.06	13	55.28	13	110.78
14	Kazuhiro Nakura	164.78	11	57.86	14	106.92
15	Hiroto Hanai	154.34	18	51.62	17	102.72
16	Kazuna Sato	153.91	20	50.58	16	103.33
17	Yuki Yoshioka	152.83	23	49.15	15	103.68
18	Kenta Omura	150.29	16	51.81	18	98.48
19	Ryota Kitamura	144.31	14	53.90	20	90.41
20	Shio Kojima	142.64	24	48.96	19	93.68
21	Hiroto Honda	139.27	15	53.89	23	85.38
22	Sakura Odagaki	137.34	22	49.61	21	87.73
23	Yota Mihara	135.76	21	49.78	22	85.98
24	Masaya Mishima	133.84	19	51.28	24	82.56
Did not advance to free skating
25	Taichi Isowa	48.65	25	48.65	—N/a	
26	Rei Suzuki	47.13	26	47.13	—N/a	
27	Sora Tarumi	45.96	27	45.96	—N/a	
28	Daiya Ebihara	45.95	28	45.95	—N/a	
29	Tomoki Kimura	45.39	29	45.39	—N/a	

==== Junior women ====
Rank	Name	Total points	SP		FS	
1	Mao Shimada	199.19	1	66.52	1	132.67
2	Mone Chiba	193.15	2	65.72	2	127.43
3	Ami Nakai	190.70	4	65.12	3	125.58
4	Ikura Kushida	184.29	5	62.32	4	121.97
5	Ayumi Shibayama	184.28	3	65.39	5	118.89
6	Yurina Okuno	166.32	7	60.45	7	105.87
7	Yo Takagi	166.07	6	61.44	8	104.63
8	Haruna Murakami	163.65	8	57.52	6	106.13
9	Noa Hozumi	161.47	10	57.22	9	104.25
10	Kaoruko Wada	158.58	9	57.37	10	101.21
11	Sae Shimizu	150.89	15	51.77	11	99.12
12	Riria Kono	149.96	13	54.05	12	95.91
13	Rena Uezono	148.99	11	56.17	16	92.82
14	Kei Yamada	144.03	17	48.76	13	95.27
15	Mayuko Oka	142.99	14	52.99	18	90.00
16	Sakurako Tanabe	140.61	19	46.91	14	93.70
17	Arisa Kamoi	138.05	21	45.22	15	92.83
18	Nana Sugiyama	136.39	12	54.81	21	81.58
19	Yurika Imazeki	136.11	16	51.20	19	84.91
20	Ayumi Nakao	136.04	24	44.60	17	91.44
21	Hono Segawa	129.23	20	46.63	20	82.60
22	Miyu Hanada	126.75	18	47.89	22	78.86
23	Yuna Nagaoka	122.52	22	45.20	23	77.32
24	Ruka Miyamoto	120.83	23	44.90	24	75.93
Did not advance to free skating
25	Marin Okamoto	44.38	25	44.38	—N/a	
26	Haruna Iwasaki	43.95	26	43.95	—N/a	
27	Miyu Irie	43.77	27	43.77	—N/a	
28	Seira Fujinuma	41.07	28	41.07	—N/a	
29	Koharu Yunoki	39.14	29	39.14	—N/a	
30	Rei Yoshimoto	38.00	30	38.00	—N/a	

==== Junior pairs ====
Rank	Name	Total points	SP		FS	
1	Haruna Murakami / Sumitada Moriguchi	149.08	1	52.72	1	96.36

==== Junior ice dance ====
Rank	Name	Total points	RD		FD	
1	Nao Kida / Masaya Morita	161.92	1	65.17	1	96.75
2	Sara Kishimoto / Atsuhiko Tamura	133.82	2	51.58	2	82.24
3	Kaho Yamashita / Yuto Nagata	109.15	3	42.52	3	66.63
4	Nanami Harazawa / Eisuke Kumano	94.31	4	36.72	4	57.59

== International team selections ==
=== Winter University Games ===
The 2023 Winter University Games was held in Lake Placid, United States from January 13–16, 2023.

	Men	Women	Ice dance
1	~~Yuma Kagiyama~~ (withdrew)	Kaori Sakamoto	
2	Shun Sato	Mai Mihara	
3	Tatsuya Tsuboi	Rion Sumiyoshi	
1st alt.	Sōta Yamamoto (called up)	Rinka Watanabe	
2nd alt.	Kosho Oshima	Maria Egawa	
3rd alt.	Kazuki Hasegawa	Mako Yamashita	

=== Four Continents Championships ===
The 2023 Four Continents Championships will be held in Colorado Springs, United States from February 7–12, 2023.

	Men	Women	Pairs	Ice dance
1	Koshiro Shimada	Rinka Watanabe	Riku Miura / Ryuichi Kihara	Kana Muramoto / Daisuke Takahashi
2	Shun Sato	Hana Yoshida		Misato Komatsubara / Tim Koleto
3	Kao Miura	Mone Chiba		
1st alt.	Kazuki Tomono	Mana Kawabe		
2nd alt.	Sōta Yamamoto	Rion Sumiyoshi		
3rd alt.	Tatsuya Tsuboi	Rika Kihira		

=== World Junior Championships ===
Commonly referred to as "Junior Worlds", the 2023 World Junior Championships will be held in Calgary, Canada from February 27 – March 5, 2023.

	Men	Women	Pairs	Ice dance
1	Nozomu Yoshioka	Mao Shimada	Haruna Murakami / Sumitada Moriguchi	Nao Kida / Masaya Morita
2	Kao Miura	Ami Nakai		
1st alt.	Shunsuke Nakamura	Mone Chiba		Sara Kishimoto / Atsuhiko Tamura
2nd alt.	Takeru Amine Kataise	Hana Yoshida		

=== World Championships ===
The 2023 World Championships will be held in Saitama, Japan from March 20–26, 2023.

	Men	Women	Pairs	Ice dance
1	Shoma Uno	Kaori Sakamoto	Riku Miura / Ryuichi Kihara	Kana Muramoto / Daisuke Takahashi
2	Sōta Yamamoto	Mai Mihara		
3	Kazuki Tomono	Rinka Watanabe		
1st alt.	Shun Sato	Hana Yoshida		Misato Komatsubara / Tim Koleto
2nd alt.	Koshiro Shimada	Mone Chiba		
3rd alt.	Kao Miura	Mana Kawabe		
