= Ikura Kushida =

Japanese figure skater (born 2007)

Personal information
- Native name: 櫛田 育良
- Born: October 29, 2007 (age 18) Aichi, Japan
- Home town: Uji, Kyoto
- Height: 1.67 m (5 ft 6 in)

Figure skating career
- Country: Japan
- Discipline: Ice dance (since 2025); Women's singles (until 2026)
- Partner: Koshiro Shimada
- Coach: Mie Hamada; Satsuki Muramoto; Hiroaki Sato; Cathy Reed
- Skating club: Kinoshita Academy
- Began skating: 2012

Medal record
Japan Championships
Silver medal – second place	2025–26 Tokyo	Ice dance

Ikura Kushida (櫛田 育良, Kushida Ikura; born October 29, 2007) is a Japanese figure skater. With ice dance partner, Koshiro Shimada, she is the 2025–26 Japanese national silver medalist.

As a singles skater, she is the 2022 JGP Czech Republic bronze medalist, the 2023–24 Japan Junior silver medalist, and the 2024–25 Japan Junior bronze medalist.

== Personal life ==
Kushida was born on 29 October, 2007 in Aichi, Japan. Apart from figure skating, she also enjoys creative dancing.

She attended Chukyo University Senior High School before enrolling in the School of Health and Sport Sciences at Chukyo University in 2026.

== Career ==
=== Singles skating career ===
==== Early years ====
Kushida began skating in 2012 at the age of four. She initially trained at the Howa Sports Land Skating Club in Aichi, where she was coached by Hiroshi Nagakubo, Yoriko Naruse, Miho Kawaume, and Yuko Hongo. In 2020, Kushida relocated to Uji, Kyoto to train at the Kinoshita Academy under coaches Mie Hamada, Satsuki Muramoto, and Hiroaki Sato.

At the 2020 Japanese National Novice Championships, Kushida finished fourth in the novice A category. The following season, she would finish twelfth at the 2020–21 Japan Junior Championships.

Throughout 2021, Kushida tried pairs skating with fellow Kinoshita Academy skater, Sumitada Moriguchi, but the pair split after less than a year together with Kushida electing to focus on singles skating. She would go on to compete at the 2021–22 Japan Junior Championships, finishing eighth.

==== 2022–23 season ====
Kushida made her international debut on the Junior Grand Prix at the 2022 JGP Czech Republic, where she won the bronze medal. She went on to compete at the 2022–23 Japan Junior Championships, finishing fourth, and was selected to compete at the 2022–23 Japan Senior Championships due to this top eight finish. She would place eighth at those championships.

Kushida finished her season by winning a silver medal at the 2023 International Challenge Cup on the junior level.

==== 2023–24 season ====
Competing on the Junior Grand Prix, Kushida started the season by competing at the 2023 JGP Japan and the 2023 JGP Armenia, finishing fourth at both events.

Kushida went on to compete at the 2023–24 Japan Junior Championships, unexpectedly winning the short program ahead of overwhelming favourite, Mao Shimada. She would place third in the free skate and won the silver medal overall behind Shimada. With this result, Kushida was selected to represent Japan at the 2024 World Junior Championships. She was also selected to compete at the 2023–24 Japan Senior Championships due to her top eight finish at the junior championships. At those championships, Kushida finished twenty-fifth in the short program and did not advance to the free skate segment of the competition. Following the event, Kushida said that while disappointed, she hoped to be able to use this experience to motivate her at future events.

At the 2024 World Junior Championships in Taipei, Kushida finished third in the short program, winning a bronze small medal for the segment. She said that she had felt "more nervous than usual" beforehand, given that it was her ISU championship debut. Kushida struggled in the free skate, falling twice, coming eleventh there and dropping to fifth overall.

==== 2024–25 season ====
Kushida started the season in late August, finishing fifth at 2024 JGP Latvia. Almost three months later, she would win the bronze medal at the 2024–25 Japan Junior Championships. This result ensured her qualification to compete at the senior championships, where she finished in fourteenth place.

In May, it was announced that Kushida had teamed up with fellow singles skater, Koshiro Shimada, with the intention of competing in the ice dance discipline. Kushida also shared that she intended to continue competing in the women's singles discipline simultaneously. It was subsequently announced that the pair would be coached by Cathy Reed at the Kinoshita Academy in Kyoto.

=== Ice dance with Koshiro Shimada ===
==== 2025–26 season: Debut of Kushida/Shimada ====
Kushida began the season by competing in the women's singles discipline on the 2025–26 ISU Junior Grand Prix series, finishing fifth at 2025 JGP United Arab Emirates.

In late October, Kushida/Shimada debuted as a team at the 2025 Western Sectional Championships, the qualifying competition for the Japanese National Championships. They won the event, almost sixteen points ahead of the second placed team, Sasaki/Ikeda. The following month, Kushida competed in the singles discipline at the 2025–26 Japan Junior Championships, where she finished in seventh place. With this result, Kushida was invited to compete at the senior national championships.

At the beginning of December Kushida/Shimada competed at their first international competition, the 2025 CS Golden Spin of Zagreb, where they placed thirteenth, narrowly missing the required technical minimum for the 2026 Winter Olympics and Four Continents Championships by 1.56 points. Kushida stated: "The result is disappointing, but I feel we managed to pull the performance together fairly well. I think it was good that we completed both the Rhythm Dance and Free Dance without major mistakes."

A couple weeks later, Kushida/Shimada won the silver medal at the 2025–26 Japan Championships behind Yoshida/Morita. Kushida also went on to finish twentieth in the women's singles event.

In April 2026, it was announced that Kushida intended to solely compete in the ice dance discipline in the upcoming 2026–27 season.

==== 2026–27 season ====
Kushida/Shimada began their season by placing 7th at the 2026 Kinoshita Group Cup.

== Programs ==
=== Ice dance with Koshiro Shimada ===
Season	Rhythm dance	Free dance	Exhibition
2026–2027	And The Waltz Goes On by Anthony Hopkins; Libertango by Astor Piazzolla choreo. by Cathy Reed	Akram Khan's Giselle by Vincenzo Lamagna choreo. by Kaitlyn Weaver	
2025–2026	Got the Groove (SM Radio Edit); Show Me Something Special; Got the Groove (SM Radio Edit); Got the Groove 2.8 (Caramba Short Traxx Remix) by SM-Trax choreo. by Cathy Reed	Moonlight Serenade by Glenn Miller performed by Boston Pops & John Williams; Theme from Sabrina by John Williams choreo. by Cathy Reed	Faith (from Sing) by Stevie Wonder & Ariana Grande choreo. by Kana Muramoto & Daisuke Takahashi

=== Women's singles ===
Season	Short program	Free skating	Exhibition
2025–2026	The Mask; Gee, Baby, Ain't I Good to You performed by Susan Boyd; Hey Pachuco by Royal Crown Revue choreo. by Cathy Reed	Variation autour d'un prélude (from Anatomie d'une chute) by Benoît Daniel; Prélude, Op. 28, No. 4 by Frédéric Chopin choreo. by Kaitlyn Weaver	Por una cabeza (from Scent of a Woman) by Itzhak Perlman, John Williams, & Pittsburgh Symphony Orchestra
2024–2025	Sway by Luis Demetrio & Pablo Beltrán Ruiz performed by Pérez Prado and His Orchestra & Rosemary Clooney; Mucho Mambo (Sway) by Luis Demetrio, Pablo Beltrán Ruiz, & Norman Gimbel performed by Galwaro, Karl8, & Andrea Monta; Sway (Mucho Mambo) by Luis Demetrio & Pablo Beltrán Ruiz performed by Simon Fava & Yvvan Back choreo. by Kaitlyn Weaver	The Little Prince; Preparation; Escape by Hans Zimmer & Richard Harvey choreo. by Kaitlyn Weaver	Por una cabeza (from Scent of a Woman) by Itzhak Perlman, John Williams, & Pittsburgh Symphony Orchestra
2023–2024	Red Violin by Joaquín Rodrigo & Ikuko Kawai choreo. by Cathy Reed	The Little Prince; Preparation; Escape by Hans Zimmer & Richard Harvey choreo. by Kaitlyn Weaver	
2022–2023	Red Violin by Joaquín Rodrigo & Ikuko Kawai choreo. by Cathy Reed	Samson and Delilah; Dance Bacchanale; S'apre per te il mio cor by Camille Saint-Saëns performed by Filippa Giordano choreo. by Cathy Reed	
2021–2022	The Sacrifice by Michael Nyman choreo. by Cathy Reed	Samson and Delilah; Dance Bacchanale; S'apre per te il mio cor by Camille Saint-Saëns performed by Filippa Giordano choreo. by Cathy Reed	

== Competitive highlights ==
- JGP – Event of the ISU Junior Grand Prix Series
- CS – Event of the ISU Challenger Series
- TBD – Assigned
- WD – Withdrew from competition

=== Ice dance with Koshiro Shimada ===
Competition placements at senior level
Season	2025–26	2026–27
GP NHK Trophy		TBD
CS Kinoshita Group Cup		7th
CS Golden Spin of Zagreb	13th	
Japan Championships	2nd	

=== Women's singles ===
Competition placements at senior level
Season	2022–23	2023–24	2024–25	2025–26
Japan Championships	8th	25th	14th	20th

Competition placements at junior level
Season	2020–21	2021–22	2022–23	2023–24	2024–25	2025–26
World Junior Championships				5th		
Japan Championships	12th	8th	4th	2nd	3rd	7th
JGP Czech Republic			3rd			
JGP Japan				4th		
JGP Latvia					5th	
JGP Poland				4th		
JGP United Arab Emirates						5th
Challenge Cup			2nd			

== Detailed results ==
=== Ice dance with Koshiro Shimada ===
ISU personal best scores in the +5/-5 GOE System
Segment	Type	Score	Event
Total	TSS	161.76	2026 CS Kinoshita Group Cup
Rhythm dance	TSS	64.86	2026 CS Kinoshita Group Cup
Rhythm dance	TES	36.93	2026 CS Kinoshita Group Cup
Rhythm dance	PCS	27.93	2026 CS Kinoshita Group Cup
Free dance	TSS	96.90	2026 CS Kinoshita Group Cup
Free dance	TES	53.00	2026 CS Kinoshita Group Cup
Free dance	PCS	44.90	2026 CS Kinoshita Group Cup

Results in the 2026–27 season
Date	Event	RD		FD		Total	
Date	Event	P	Score	P	Score	P	Score
Sep 4–6, 2026	(Japan) 2026 Kinoshita Group Cup	7	64.86	8	96.90	7	161.76
Nov 27–29, 2026	(Japan) 2026 NHK Trophy						TBD

Results in the 2025–26 season
Date	Event	RD		FD		Total	
Date	Event	P	Score	P	Score	P	Score
Dec 3–6, 2025	(Croatia) 2025 CS Golden Spin of Zagreb	12	59.19	12	89.43	13	148.62
Dec 18–21, 2025	2025–26 Japan Championships	2	64.99	2	100.76	2	165.67

=== Women's singles ===
ISU personal best scores in the +5/-5 GOE System
Segment	Type	Score	Event
Total	TSS	180.97	2024 World Junior Championships
Short program	TSS	66.61	2024 World Junior Championships
Short program	TES	37.79	2024 World Junior Championships
Short program	PCS	29.19	2023 JGP Japan
Free skating	TSS	121.35	2022 JGP Czech Republic
Free skating	TES	64.14	2022 JGP Czech Republic
Free skating	PCS	59.41	2023 JGP Japan

==== Senior level ====
Results in the 2022–23 season
Date	Event	SP		FS		Total	
Date	Event	P	Score	P	Score	P	Score
Dec 21–25, 2022	2022–23 Japan Championships	9	63.29	10	127.29	8	190.58

Results in the 2023–24 season
Date	Event	SP		FS		Total	
Date	Event	P	Score	P	Score	P	Score
Dec 20–24, 2023	2023–24 Japan Championships	25	50.20	—N/a	—N/a	25	50.90

Results in the 2024–25 season
Date	Event	SP		FS		Total	
Date	Event	P	Score	P	Score	P	Score
Dec 19–22, 2024	2024–25 Japan Championships	13	64.46	16	122.68	14	187.14

Results in the 2025–26 season
Date	Event	SP		FS		Total	
Date	Event	P	Score	P	Score	P	Score
Dec 18–21, 2025	2025–26 Japan Championships	22	55.47	19	115.39	20	170.86

==== Junior level ====
2025–26 season
Date	Event	SP	FS	Total
November 22–24, 2025	2025–26 Japan Junior Championships	3; 64.37	11; 108.21	7; 172.58
October 8–11, 2025	2025 JGP United Arab Emirates	5; 59.53	9; 109.71	5; 169.24
2024–25 season
Date	Event	SP	FS	Total
November 15–17, 2024	2024–25 Japan Junior Championships	3; 64.54	2; 124.98	3; 189.52
August 28–31, 2024	2024 JGP Latvia	2; 66.36	8; 99.65	5; 166.01
2023–24 season
Date	Event	SP	FS	Total
February 26–March 3, 2024	2024 World Junior Championships	3; 66.61	11; 114.36	5; 180.97
November 17–19, 2023	2023–24 Japan Junior Championships	1; 65.30	3; 124.82	2; 190.12
October 4–7, 2023	2023 JGP Armenia	4; 59.99	3; 113.72	4; 173.71
September 13–16, 2023	2023 JGP Japan	3; 62.79	5; 113.30	4; 176.09
2022–23 season
Date	Event	SP	FS	Total
February 23–26, 2023	2023 International Challenge Cup	2; 61.45	2; 119.38	2; 180.83
November 25–27, 2022	2022–23 Japan Junior Championships	5; 62.32	4; 121.97	4; 184.29
August 31–September 3, 2022	2022 JGP Czech Republic	8; 55.67	3; 121.35	3; 177.02
2021–22 season
Date	Event	SP	FS	Total
November 19–21, 2021	2021–22 Japan Junior Championships	9; 57.35	7; 107.74	8; 165.09
2020–21 season
Date	Event	SP	FS	Total
November 21–23, 2020	2020–21 Japan Junior Championships	12; 53.21	13; 89.66	12; 142.87
