= Haruna Murakami =

Japanese figure skater (born 2008)

- Murakami/Moriguchi at the 2022–23 Junior Grand Prix Final

Personal information
- Native name: 村上 遥奈
- Other names: Haruna Chan
- Born: July 30, 2008 (age 18) Perth, Australia
- Home town: Uji, Kyoto
- Height: 1.54 m (5 ft 1 in)

Figure skating career
- Country: Australia (since 2026); Japan (until 2026)
- Discipline: Women's singles (since 2018); Pair skating (2022–23)
- Coach: Utako Nagamitsu; Yusuke Hayashi
- Began skating: 2013
Representing Japan
Japan Championships
Gold medal – first place	2022–23 Osaka	Pairs

Haruna Murakami (村上 遥奈, Murakami Haruna; born July 30, 2008) is a Japanese-Australian figure skater.

As a single skater for Japan, she is the 2023 JGP Linz silver medalist and the 2021–22 Japan Novice A bronze medalist.

Murakami also briefly competed in the pairs discipline for Japan with Sumitada Moriguchi. Together, they are the 2022 JGP Poland I bronze medalists and the 2022–23 Japan champions at both the senior and junior levels.

== Personal life ==
Haruna Murakami was born on 30 July 2008 in Perth, Australia to a Japanese mother and Hong Kongese father. She lived there for the first eight years of her life before moving to Japan to pursue her figure skating career.

== Career ==
=== Skating for Japan ===
==== Early career ====
Murakami began figure skating in 2013.

She won the bronze medal at the 2021–22 Japan Novice Championships and placed twenty-fifth at the 2021–22 Japan Junior Championships.

==== 2022–23 season: Pair skating with Sumitada Moriguchi ====
At the suggestion of her coach, Mie Hamada, Murakami decided to try pairs skating, teaming up with fellow Hamada student, Sumitada Moriguchi. While Hamada remained their singles coach, they were simultaneously coached by former Japanese pairs skater, Narumi Takahashi, while also working with Bruno Marcotte and Brian Shales. Murakami/Moriguchi made their debut as a pair team on the 2022–23 Junior Grand Prix, pacing fourth at the 2022 JGP Czech Republic and third at the 2022 JGP Poland I.

Competing at the 2022–23 Japan Junior Championships, Murakami/Moriguchi won the gold medal. Murakami also competed in the women's singles event, where she finished eighth.

Although initially listed as alternates to compete at the 2022–23 Junior Grand Prix Final in Turin, Italy, they were ultimately called up to compete due to the withdrawal of Canadian pair team Kemp/Elizarov. At the Final, Murakami/Moriguchi placed fifth in the short program and third in the free skate, finishing in fourth place overall. They went on to compete at the 2022–23 Japan Championships, which they won after reigning national champions Miura/Kihara were forced to withdraw due to flight delays. Murakami also competed in the women's singles event at Nationals and finished seventeenth.

Selected to compete at the 2023 World Junior Championships in Calgary, Alberta, Murakami/Moriguchi finished fourth after placing sixth in the short program and fourth in the free skate. Murakami went on to compete at the 2023 Triglav Trophy on the junior level, where she won the silver medal behind Mao Shimada.

Following the season, it was announced that Murakami/Moriguchi had parted ways due to Moriguchi no longer being age eligible to compete on the junior level and Murakami being age ineligible to compete on the senior level for another three years. Murakami stated that she planned to focus on singles skating for the following season.

==== 2023–24 season ====
Murakami made her Junior Grand Prix debut as a singles skater at the 2023 JGP Austria, where she finished second in the short program, third in the free skate, and won the silver medal. She subsequently came thirteenth at the 2023 JGP Hungary.

At the 2023–24 Japan Championships, Murakami finished sixth at the junior level and nineteenth at the senior level.

==== 2024–25 season ====
Murakami started the season by finishing sixth at the 2024–25 Japan Junior Championships. This result ensured her qualification to compete at the senior championships, where she finished in seventeenth place.

==== 2025–26 season ====
Murakami began the season by competing on the 2025–26 ISU Junior Grand Prix series. In late August, she finished fourth at 2025 JGP Turkey after placing third in both the short and free program competition segments. The following month, Murakami competed at 2025 JGP Azerbaijan, where she finished tenth.

In late November, she competed at the 2025–26 Japan Junior Championships, where she finished in eighth place overall. With this placement, Murakami was invited to compete at the senior national championships, where she finished in twenty-first place.

=== Skating for Australia ===
==== 2026–27 season ====
In April 2026, it was announced that Murakami had made the decision to begin competing for her birth country of Australia. In June of that year, Murakami shared that she had made a coaching change and was now splitting her time between training at the Kansai Airport Ice Arena under Utako Nagamitsu and at the Healthpia Kurashiki Ice Arena under Yusuke Hayashi.

Murakami made her international debut for Australia at the 2026 Junior Grand Prix in Slovenia, finishing in fourteenth place.

== Programs ==
=== Singles skating ===
Season	Short program	Free skating
2026–2027	Vogue by Madonna choreo. by Akiko Suzuki	Tree of Life Suite; Meraviglia by Roberto Cacciapaglia choreo. by Kana Muramoto
2025–2026	The Sound of Silence by Simon & Garfunkel performed by Cinematic Pop & Mckenna Breinholt choreo. by Kana Muramoto	Titanic; Southampton; An Irish Party in Third Class; Unable to Stay, Unwilling to Leave; My Heart Will Go On by James Horner performed by Celine Dion choreo. by Kaitlyn Weaver
2024–2025	Dance Monkey by Tones and I choreo. by Cathy Reed	Mulan; Ancestors; Honor to Us All; Mulan Rides into Battle by Harry Gregson-Williams choreo. by Kaitlyn Weaver
2023–2024	Dance Monkey by Tones and I choreo. by Cathy Reed	Australia; Welcome to Australia (Overture) by David Hirschfelder, David Gulpilil; Faraway Downs by Felix Meagher, Baz Luhrmann, Angela Little; Waltzing Matilda performed by Ophelia of the Spirits choreo. by Cathy Reed
2022–2023	Just Wave Hello by Charlotte Church choreo. by Mihoko Higuchi	Australia; Welcome to Australia (Overture) by David Hirschfelder, David Gulpilil; Faraway Downs by Felix Meagher, Baz Luhrmann, Angela Little; Waltzing Matilda performed by Ophelia of the Spirits choreo. by Cathy Reed

=== With Moriguchi ===
Season	Short program	Free skating
2022–2023	Le Corsaire by Adolphe Adam, Léo Delibes choreo. by Cathy Reed	I Want to Hold Your Hand; All My Loving; All You Need Is Love (from Across the Universe) by The Beatles, Elliot Goldenthal, T. V. Carpio, Jim Sturgess, Dana Fuchs choreo. by Cathy Reed

== Competitive highlights ==
- JGP – Event of the ISU Junior Grand Prix Series
- TBD – Assigned
- WD – Withdrew from competition

=== Singles skating for Australia ===
Competition placements at senior level
Season	2026–27
CS Budapest Trophy	19th
CS Tallinn Trophy	28th

Competition placements at junior level
Season	2026–27
JGP Poland	WD
JGP Slovenia	14th

=== Singles skating for Japan ===
Competition placements at senior level
Season	2025–26	2023–24	2024–25	2025–26
Japan Championships	17th	19th	17th	21st

Competition placements at junior level
Season	2021–22	2022–23	2023–24	2024–25	2025–26
Japan Championships	25th	8th	6th	6th	8th
JGP Austria			2nd		
JGP Azerbaijan					10th
JGP Hungary			13th		
JGP Turkey					4th
Triglav Trophy		2nd			

=== Pair skating with Sumitada Moriguchi for Japan ===
International: Junior
Event	22–23
Junior Worlds	4th
JGP Final	4th
JGP Czech Republic	4th
JGP Poland	3rd
National
Japan Championships	1st
Japan Junior Championships	1st

== Detailed results ==
ISU personal best scores in the +5/-5 GOE System
Segment	Type	Score	Event
Total	**TSS**	**186.22**	2025 JGP Turkey
Short program	**TSS**	**64.22**	2025 JGP Turkey
Short program	TES	35.96	2023 JGP Austria
Short program	PCS	28.32	2025 JGP Turkey
Free skating	**TSS**	**122.10**	2025 JGP Turkey
Free skating	TES	63.95	2025 JGP Turkey
Free skating	PCS	58.15	2025 JGP Turkey

Current personal best scores are highlighted in bold.

=== For Australia ===
==== Senior level ====
Results in the 2026–27 season
Date	Event	SP		FS		Total	
Date	Event	P	Score	P	Score	P	Score
Oct 15–18, 2026	(Hungary) 2026 CS Budapest Trophy	26	47.35	18	93.72	19	141.07
Nov 16–22, 2026	(Estonia) 2026 CS Tallinn Trophy	29	36.36	26	85.57	28	121.93

==== Junior level ====
Results in the 2026–27 season
Date	Event	SP		FS		Total	
Date	Event	P	Score	P	Score	P	Score
Oct 1–3, 2026	2026 JGP Slovenia	13	51.11	14	81.48	14	132.59

=== For Japan ===
==== Senior level ====
Results in the 2025–26 season
Date	Event	SP		FS		Total	
Date	Event	P	Score	P	Score	P	Score
Dec 18–21, 2025	2025–26 Japan Championships	20	56.84	20	113.95	21	170.79

2024–25 season
Date	Event	SP	FS	Total
December 19–22, 2024	2024–25 Japan Championships	19; 57.26	15; 122.95	17; 180.21
2023–24 season
Date	Event	SP	FS	Total
December 20–24, 2023	2023–24 Japan Championships	23; 53.13	19; 105.73	19; 158.86
2022–23 season
Date	Event	SP	FS	Total
December 21–25, 2022	2022–23 Japan Championships	15; 59.23	19; 104.53	17; 163.76

==== Junior level ====
2025–26 season
Date	Event	SP	FS	Total
November 22–24, 2025	2025–26 Japan Junior Championships	7; 60.42	8; 111.94	8; 172.36
September 24–27, 2025	2025 JGP Azerbaijan	12; 51.23	10; 106.68	10; 157.91
August 27–30, 2025	2025 JGP Turkey	3; **64.10**	3; **122.10**	4; **186.22**
2024–25 season
Date	Event	SP	FS	Total
November 15–17, 2024	2024–25 Japan Junior Championships	8; 59.06	7; 118.53	6; 177.59
**2023–24 season**
Date	Event	SP	FS	Total
November 17–19, 2023	2023–24 Japan Junior Championships	5; 62.30	8; 106.18	6; 168.48
September 20–23, 2023	2023 JGP Hungary	10; 57.51	11; 97.11	13; 154.62
August 30–September 2, 2023	2023 JGP Austria	2; 62.66	3; 105.71	2; 168.37
2022–23 season
Date	Event	SP	FS	Total
April 13–16, 2023	2023 Triglav Trophy	2; 63.16	2; 120.55	2; 183.71
November 25–27, 2022	2022–23 Japan Junior Championships	8; 57.52	6; 106.13	8; 163.65
2021–22 season
December 19–21, 2021	2021–22 Japan Junior Championships	25; 47.36	–	25; 47.36

=== Pair skating ===
==== With Moriguchi ====
2022–23 season
Date	Event	Level	SP	FS	Total
February 27–March 5, 2023	2023 World Junior Championships	Junior	6; **55.69**	4; **99.02**	4; **154.71**
December 21–25, 2022	2022–23 Japan Championships	Senior	1; 54.21	1; 107.86	1; 162.07
December 8–11, 2022	2022–23 JGP Final	Junior	5; 46.80	3; 102.23	4; 149.03
November 25–27, 2022	2022–23 Japan Junior Championships	Junior	1; 52.72	1; 96.36	1; 149.08
September 28–October 1, 2022	2022 JGP Poland I	Junior	4; 47.94	2; 92.41	3; 140.35
August 31–September 3, 2022	2022 JGP Czech Republic	Junior	5; 42.34	3; 87.50	4; 129.84
