= Shunsuke Nakamura (figure skater) =

Japanese figure skater

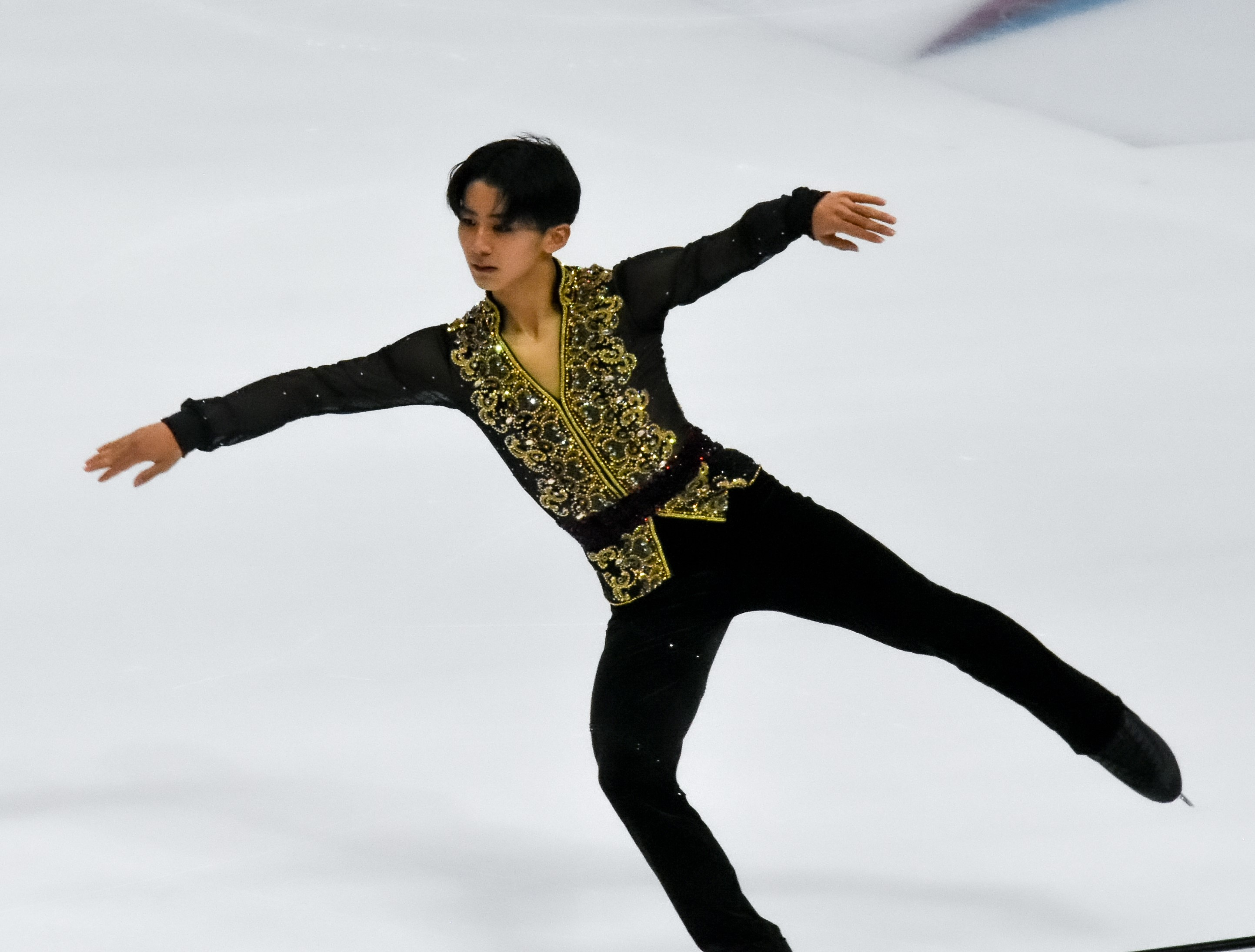
- Nakamura at the 2022–23 Junior Grand Prix Final

Personal information
- Native name: 中村俊介
- Other names: Nakamura Shunsuke
- Born: 8 June 2005 (age 21) Nagoya, Aichi Prefecture, Japan
- Home town: Kyoto
- Height: 1.68 m (5 ft 6 in)

Figure skating career
- Country: Japan
- Discipline: Men's singles
- Coach: Mie Hamada; Satsuki Muramoto; Hiroaki Sato; Noriyuki Kanzaki
- Skating club: Kinoshita Academy
- Began skating: 2010

Shunsuke Nakamura (中村俊介, Nakamura Shunsuke; born 8 June 2005) is a Japanese figure skater. He is a five-time ISU Junior Grand Prix medalist and the 2023 Japanese Junior National champion.

== Personal life ==
Nakamura was born on 8 June 2005, in Nagoya, Aichi Prefecture, Japan. In 2024, Nakamura graduated from Chukyo High School. He then enrolled into the Faculty of Commerce at Doshisha University.

His figure skating idols are Daisuke Takahashi and Kazuki Tomono.

== Career ==
=== Early career ===
Nakamura began figure skating in 2010 after following his older sister into the sport. He first trained at the Meito Figure Skating Club in Aichi and was coached by Yuko Monna.

He debuted as an advanced novice skater at the 2017 Asian Open Trophy, where he won the silver medal. He went on to win bronze at the 2017–18 Japan Advanced Novice Championships and place twenty-sixth at the 2017–18 Japan Junior Championships. He finished off that season with a silver medal on the advanced novice level of the 2018 Challenge Cup.

The following season, Nakamura won a silver medal at the Asian Open Trophy on the advanced novice level for a second consecutive time. He then won silver at the 2018–19 Japan Advanced Novice Championships, before finishing fourteenth at the 2018–19 Japan Junior Championships. He ended the season with an advanced novice gold medal at the 2019 Coupe du Printemps.

Prior to the 2019–20 figure skating season, Nakamura moved to Takatsuki, Osaka to train under Mie Hamada at the Kansai University Skating Club. During that season, Nakamura finished fourteenth at the 2019–20 Japan Junior Championships.

In spring 2020, Hamada transferred to the Kinoshita Academy Ice Arena in Kyoto. Nakamura, in turn, relocated to Kyoto as well to continue being coached by her.

The following season, Nakamura placed sixth 2020–21 Japan Junior Championships before debuting at the senior championships, where he finished seventeenth. The next year, Nakamura finished sixth at the 2021–22 Japan Junior Championships and twenty-fifth at the 2021–22 Japan Senior Championships, before ending the season with a gold medal on the junior level at the 2022 Challenge Cup.

=== 2022–23 season ===
Nakamura debuted on the 2022–23 Junior Grand Prix circuit, winning gold at the 2022 JGP France and silver at 2022 JGP Italy. With these results, Nakamura qualified for the 2022–23 Junior Grand Prix Final in Turin, Italy. He went on to compete at the 2022–23 Japan Junior Championships, finishing fourth.

At the Junior Grand Prix final, Nakamura placed third in the short program but sixth in the free skate, dropping to fourth-place overall. One week later, he competed at the 2022–23 Japan Senior Championships where he finished eleventh. He ended the season by winning a gold medal on the junior level at the 2023 Triglav Trophy.

=== 2023–24 season ===
Nakamura began the season by competing on 2023–24 Junior Grand Prix circuit. He first competed at 2023 JGP Japan where he finished a disappointing eighth place after placing second in the short program and twelfth in the free skate. He would see more success at 2023 JGP Armenia, where he won silver.

At the 2023–24 Japan Junior Championships, Nakamura managed to win the gold medal, edging out Rio Nakata, who would go on to win the 2023–24 Junior Grand Prix Final weeks later. Following the event, Nakamura said, "I'm happy to finally be able to win. I was nervous [about the free skate], but the practice I've been doing gave me confidence and I was able to get through it." With this result, Nakamura was selected to compete at the 2024 World Junior Championships in Taipei, Taiwan. The following month, Nakamura competed at the 2023–24 Japan Senior Championships, finishing in fourteenth-place.

At the World Junior Championships, Nakamura placed tenth in the short program but fourth in the free skate, finishing in fourth-place overall. “For me, this competition had been the one I worked hard for the most,” said Nakamura. “And my condition matched it. I'm happy that I was able to skate my free for the last time.” Looking back on his season, Nakamura said, "It wasn't what I had imagined, and I wanted to achieve better results. It was a season with a lot to learn, and there were several competitions where I was doing well in practice, but not in the actual competition. But even in those situations, I was able to switch gears. I was able to gain a lot of experience outside of skating, and although the results weren't great, I think it was a really good season in terms of my personal growth."

=== 2024–25 season ===
Nakamura started the season by competing on the 2024–25 Junior Grand Prix circuit. He came fifth in the short program at the 2024 JGP Latvia, but moved up to third place after the free skate, claiming the bronze medal. Weeks later he won the silver medal at the 2024 JGP Turkey.

In late December, Nakamura placed eleventh at the 2024–25 Japan Championships and was subsequently named to the World Junior team.

At the 2025 World Junior Championships in Debrecen, Hungary, Nakamura concluded the season by finishing the event in sixth place. “I made mistakes both in the short and free program, but I was able to regain my control,” he said. “Through this competition, I was able to grasp the feeling of approaching a match with a strong mindset, so I think this will lead to my growth.”

Nakamura described his performances at Junior Worlds in Hungary as the season's highlight. "I was very nervous for both programs, but I was able to enjoy performing and stay focused until the end," he said. "I think those were my best performances of the entire season."

While Nakamura already has a quad toe in his repertoire, he plans to debut the quadruple Salchow for the 2025–26 season. "I'm working on including one quad in the short and two quads in the free," he says of his planned layout. "The Salchow is still a work in progress."

=== 2025–26 season ===
Nakamura opened the season by finishing thirteenth at the 2025 CS Kinoshita Group Cup. He subsequently went on to finish nineteenth at the 2025–26 Japan Championships.

== Programs ==
Season	Short program	Free skating	Exhibition
2025–2026	Yesterday by The Beatles performed by Babyface, Chloe Flower, & Royal Philharmonic Orchestra choreo. by Misha Ge	The Last Samurai; Opening Theme; To Know My Enemy; Idyll's End; Red Warrior by Hans Zimmer & City of Prague Philharmonic Orchestra choreo. by Kana Muramoto	
2024–2025	Larger Than Life; Everybody (Backstreet's Back) by Backstreet Boys choreo. by Kaitlyn Weaver	Lamentations of the Heart by Philip Wesley; lo Ci Saro by Andrea Bocelli, Lang Lang, David Foster, & Walter Afanasieff choreo. by Kana Muramoto	Heart Warriors by Byron Metcalf; Kings by Tribe Society
2023–2024	El Conquistador by Maxime Rodriguez choreo. by Cathy Reed	Child of Nazareth by Maxime Rodriguez choreo. by Kenji Miyamoto	
2022–2023	El Conquistador by Maxime Rodriguez choreo. by Cathy Reed	Sheik by Mercan Dede choreo. by Tom Dickson	
2021–2022	Eye by coba choreo. by Cathy Reed	Moonlight Sonata by Ludwig van Beethoven performed by Wilhelm Backhaus choreo. by Kenji Miyamoto	
2020–2021	Austrias by Isaac Albéniz choreo. by Cathy Reed	Moonlight Sonata by Ludwig van Beethoven performed by Wilhelm Backhaus choreo. by Kenji Miyamoto	

== Competitive highlights ==
- GP – Event of the ISU Grand Prix Series
- JGP – Event of the ISU Junior Grand Prix Series
- CS – Event of the ISU Challenger Series
- TBD – Assigned
- WD – Withdrew from competition
- Medals at team events are awarded for the team results only. Individual placements at team events are listed in parentheses.

Competition placements at senior level
Season	2020–21	2021–22	2022–23	2023–24	2024–25	2025–26
Japan Championships	17th	25th	11th	14th	11th	19th
CS Kinoshita Group Cup						13th

Competition placements at junior level
Season	2017–18	2018–19	2019–20	2020–21	2021–22	2022–23	2023–24	2024–25
World Junior Championships							4th	6th
Junior Grand Prix Final						4th		
Japan Championships	26th	14th	14th	6th	6th	4th	1st	
JGP Armenia							2nd	
JGP France						1st		
JGP Italy						2nd		
JGP Japan							8th	
JGP Latvia								3rd
JGP Turkey								2nd
Challenge Cup					1st			
Triglav Trophy						1st		

== Detailed results ==
ISU personal best scores in the +5/-5 GOE System
Segment	Type	Score	Event
Total	TSS	225.69	2025 World Junior Championships
Short program	TSS	81.29	2025 World Junior Championships
Short program	TES	44.20	2025 World Junior Championships
Short program	PCS	37.82	2023 JGP Japan
Free skating	TSS	144.40	2025 World Junior Championships
Free skating	TES	74.04	2024 JGP Latvia
Free skating	PCS	72.43	2024 World Junior Championships

Small medals for short and free programs awarded only at ISU Championships.

=== Senior level ===
Results in the 2025–26 season
Date	Event	SP		FS		Total	
Date	Event	P	Score	P	Score	P	Score
Sep 5–7, 2025	(Japan) 2025 CS Kinoshita Group Cup	8	79.34	13	108.78	13	188.12
Dec 18–21, 2025	2025–26 Japan Championships	22	66.96	18	127.14	19	194.10

2024–25 season
Date	Event	SP	FS	Total
19–22 December 2024	2024–25 Japan Championships	13; 73.96	10; 140.29	11; 214.25
2023–24 season
Date	Event	SP	FS	Total
20–24 December 2023	2023–24 Japan Championships	9; 80.16	19; 127.54	14; 207.70
2022–23 season
Date	Event	SP	FS	Total
21–25 December 2022	2022–23 Japan Championships	8; 77.74	10; 140.34	11; 218.08
2021–22 season
Date	Event	SP	FS	Total
22–26 December 2021	2021–22 Japan Championships	25; 52.78	–	25; 52.78
2020–21 season
Date	Event	SP	FS	Total
23–27 December 2020	2020–21 Japan Championships	18; 63.97	16; 120.04	17; 184.01

=== Junior level ===
2024–25 season
Date	Event	SP	FS	Total
25 February – 2 March 2025	2025 World Junior Championships	4; 81.29	8; 144.40	6; 225.69
18–21 September 2024	2024 JGP Turkey	2; 75.59	3; 129.90	2; 205.49
28–31 August 2024	2024 JGP Latvia	5; 68.39	3; 144.34	3; 212.73
2023–24 season
Date	Event	SP	FS	Total
26 February – 3 March 2024	2024 World Junior Championships	10; 72.85	4; 142.61	4; 215.46
17–19 November 2023	2023–24 Japan Junior Championships	1; 76.81	2; 135.61	1; 212.42
4–7 October 2023	2023 JGP Armenia	2; 77.30	3; 137.37	2; 214.67
13–16 September 2023	2023 JGP Japan	2; 74.04	12; 113.84	8; 187.88
2022–23 season
Date	Event	SP	FS	Total
13–16 April 2023	2023 Triglav Trophy	1; 74.67	1; 122.76	1; 197.43
8 December – 11 December 2022	2022–23 Junior Grand Prix Final	3; 74.81	6; 123.83	4; 198.64
25–27 November 2022	2022–23 Japan Junior Championships	3; 70.28	5; 126.64	4; 196.92
12–15 October 2022	2022 JGP Italy	2; 73.61	1; 137.40	2; 211.01
24–27 August 2022	2022 JGP France	1; 77.68	1; 141.97	1; 219.65
2021–22 season
Date	Event	SP	FS	Total
24–27 February 2022	2022 Challenge Cup	1; 78.33	2; 133.54	1; 211.87
19–21 November 2021	2021–22 Japan Junior Championships	4; 67.42	6; 112.71	6; 180.13
2020–21 season
Date	Event	SP	FS	Total
21–23 November 2020	2020–21 Japan Junior Championships	8; 66.58	6; 115.65	6; 182.23
2019–20 season
Date	Event	SP	FS	Total
15–17 November 2019	2019–20 Japan Junior Championships	16; 57.80	13; 107.13	14; 164.93
2018–19 season
Date	Event	SP	FS	Total
23–25 November 2018	2018–19 Japan Junior Championships	16; 48.97	11; 100.48	14; 149.45
2017–18 season
Date	Event	SP	FS	Total
24–26 November 2017	2017–18 Japan Junior Championships	26; 38.86	–	26; 38.86
