= Miyabi Oba =

Japanese figure skater

Personal information
- Born: August 8, 1995 (age 31) Tokoname, Aichi
- Home town: Seto, Aichi
- Height: 1.61 m (5 ft 3 1/2 in)

Figure skating career
- Country: Japan
- Coach: Yuko Monna; Rina Horie; Haruka Oshima
- Skating club: Tokai Tokyo FH
- Began skating: 2005

Miyabi Oba (大庭 雅, Ōba Miyabi; born August 8, 1995) is a Japanese figure skater. She is the 2014 Cup of Nice silver medalist, 2014 Gardena Spring Trophy silver medalist, and 2013 Triglav Trophy silver medalist. At the junior level, she is the 2012 JGP Germany silver medalist, 2013 JGP Estonia bronze medalist, and the 2010 Japanese Junior national bronze medalist.

== Career ==
Oba began skating at the age of ten. Her parents were fans of figure skating, but when she did not initially enjoy skating as a child, they instead enrolled her in a number of different activities. She particularly focused on Go and artistic gymnastics. At age ten, she realized she was behind her fellow gymnasts, and her father encouraged her to take up figure skating. Oba struggled to balance both skating and gymnastics, as she rotated in different directions in either sport when jumping or flipping, and she decided to pursue skating.

=== Junior career ===
Oba was able to land double jumps less than a year later, but it took her several years to begin landing triple jumps. She landed a triple Salchow jump in her first year as a junior, in 2009. Within three months, she was able to perform four other triple jumps as well. Oba attributed this to the fact that she had been practicing triples of five jump types concurrently, rather than attempting to master one before moving on to the next. She debuted at the Japan Junior Championships that season and placed 9th.

The next season, Oba focused on improving her skating skills and ability to perform choreography. She made her international debut at the 2010 Cup of Nice. Competing on the senior level, she finished 7th. After winning the bronze medal at the 2010–11 Japanese Junior Championships, she advanced to the senior championships, where she placed 8th. She was assigned to the 2011 World Junior Championships, where she again finished 8th. Oba later recalled this as her best season. After the World Junior championships, however, she faced pressure to increase her difficulty and aim to compete at major competitions, something that did not motivate her.

The following season, she received her first ISU Junior Grand Prix assignment. In the 2012–13 season, Oba won her first JGP medal, silver, competing at an event in Germany. She placed 4th in her other JGP assignment in Turkey. Nationally, Oba placed 6th on the junior level and 11th as a senior. She ended her season with her first senior international medal, also silver, at the 2013 Triglav Trophy.

On the 2013–14 Junior Grand Prix series, Oba placed 7th in Poland and then won a bronze medal in Estonia. She ended her season with another senior international silver medal at the 2014 Gardena Spring Trophy.

=== University years ===
In 2014, she enrolled in Chukyo University. During the 2014–15 season, Oba made her senior Grand Prix debut at the Rostelecom Cup, where she placed 6th with a personal best free skate and total score, and she won silver at the International Cup of Nice. In February, she competed at the 2015 Winter Universiade and finished in 7th. The next season, she competed domestically and finished 17th at the Japan Championships.

In 2016, she asked Miki Ando, who had also trained with her coach, to choreograph her new short program, although Ando was not experienced as a choreographer. Ando initially refused, but after Oba asked her repeatedly, she agreed to choreograph for her. She also watched all of Oba's programs and gave her feedback on her movements and habits. That season, Oba placed 13th at Japanese nationals, and although she had intended to retire after graduating, she felt that she had improved and still enjoyed skating, and she made the unusual decision to continue competing once she completed university. Tokai Tokyo Financial Holdings agreed to employ her while letting her continue to train full-time.

=== Post-university career ===
After a poor performance at the 2017 West Japan Championships, a regional qualifier for the national championships, Oba did not reach the national championships for the first time in eight years. She then qualified again the next year. Despite training 13 hours a day, Oba began to spend longer periods struggling to land her triple jumps in the off-season, the cause of which she struggled to figure out. She eventually found that it was because she was losing strength, and she changed her exercise regime to improve her explosive power.

In 2020, after she placed 21st at the West Japan Championships, her company informed her that she might not have a contract the following season. Oba's fans wrote her letters and messages and called Tokai Tokyo to express their support for her, which led to her contract being extended by one year.

Oba was the oldest competitor at the 2022–23 Japan Championships.

For her 2024–2025 short program, Oba asked her friend Satoko Miyahara to choreograph the program, as Oba wanted to incorporate aspects of Miyahara's movement style into her own. Oba said that in her program, she wanted to convey her enjoyment of the sport, which she thought was sometimes too focused on results.

In March 2026, she announced she would be "closing a chapter" on her competitive career due to a lack of training time. In April, she began working full-time and training only on weekends. Finding that she was struggling in practice, she focused on off-ice training after work and on making her on-ice training time more productive. Oba said that while her physical stamina and jumps had declined, she felt that she had grown in terms of performance and skating skills, and that she found it fulfilling to start her professional career while continuing to skate.

== Programs ==
Season	Short program	Free skating	Exhibition
2025–26	Mizu Hyakkei (水百景) by Ikuko Kawai choreo. by Satoko Miyahara	The Notebook by Aaron Zigman choreo. by Miyabi Oba	
2024–25	Mizu Hyakkei (水百景) by Ikuko Kawai choreo. by Satoko Miyahara	Iryū Team Medical Dragon; Aesthetic; Spirit (Strings Version) by Hiroyuki Sawano choreo. by Miyabi Oba and Miki Ando	
2023–24	Jonetsu Tairiku by Taro Hakase choreo. by Miki Ando	Iryū Team Medical Dragon; Aesthetic; Spirit (Strings Version) by Hiroyuki Sawano choreo. by Miyabi Oba and Miki Ando	
2022–23	Send in the Clowns by Stephen Sondheim choreo. by Miyabi Oba	Iryū Team Medical Dragon; Aesthetic; Spirit (Strings Version) by Hiroyuki Sawano choreo. by Miyabi Oba and Miki Ando	
2021–22	Send in the Clowns by Stephen Sondheim choreo. by Miyabi Oba	Titanic by James Horner choreo. by Miki Ando	
2020–21	Send in the Clowns by Stephen Sondheim choreo. by Miyabi Oba	Titanic by James Horner choreo. by Miki Ando	
2019–20	Firedance (from Riverdance) by Bill Whelan choreo. by Miki Ando	Titanic by James Horner choreo. by Miki Ando	
2018–19	Firedance (from Riverdance) by Bill Whelan choreo. by Miki Ando	East Of Eden by Lee Holdridge choreo. by Miki Ando	
2017–18	Gabriel's Oboe (from The Mission) choreo. by Miki Ando	East Of Eden by Lee Holdridge choreo. by Miki Ando	
2016–17	Gabriel's Oboe (from The Mission) choreo. by Miki Ando	The Chronicles of Narnia: The Lion, the Witch and the Wardrobe by Harry Gregson-Williams choreo. by Kenji Miyamoto	
2015–16	Resphoina by Joe Hisaishi choreo. by Kenji Miyamoto	The Chronicles of Narnia: The Lion, the Witch and the Wardrobe by Harry Gregson-Williams choreo. by Kenji Miyamoto	
2014–15	Resphoina by Joe Hisaishi choreo. by Kenji Miyamoto	Les Misérables by Claude-Michel Schönberg	
2013–14	Tempest by Gaetano Pugnani & Fritz Kreisler	Les Misérables by Claude-Michel Schönberg	
2012–13	Tempest by Gaetano Pugnani & Fritz Kreisler	The Firebird by Igor Stravinsky	
2011–12	Tempest by Gaetano Pugnani & Fritz Kreisler	Polovtsian Dances (from Prince Igor) by Alexander Borodin	Shall We Dance? (from The King and I) by Richard Rodgers
2010–11	Liberty Fanfare by John Williams	Polovtsian Dances (from Prince Igor) by Alexander Borodin	

== Competitive highlights ==
- GP – Event of the ISU Grand Prix Series
- JGP – Event of the ISU Junior Grand Prix Series
- TBD – Assigned

Competition placements at senior level
Season	2010–11	2011–12	2012–13	2013–14	2014–15	2015–16	2016–17	2018–19	2019–20	2021–22	2022–23	2023–24	2024–25	2025–26
Japan Championships	8th	13th	11th	10th	12th	17th	13th	19th	28th	19th	20th	21st	21st	25th
GP Rostelecom Cup					6th									
Cup of Nice	7th				2nd									
Gardena Spring Trophy				2nd										
Triglav Trophy			2nd											
Universiade					7th									

Competition placements at junior level
Season	2009–10	2010–11	2011–12	2012–13	2013–14
World Junior Championships		8th			
Junior Grand Prix Final					3rd
Japan Championships	9th	3rd	5th	6th	
JGP Estonia					3rd
JGP Germany				2nd	
JGP Latvia			7th		
JGP Poland					7th
JGP Turkey				4th	
