= Ryuichi Kihara =

Japanese retired pair skater (born 1992)

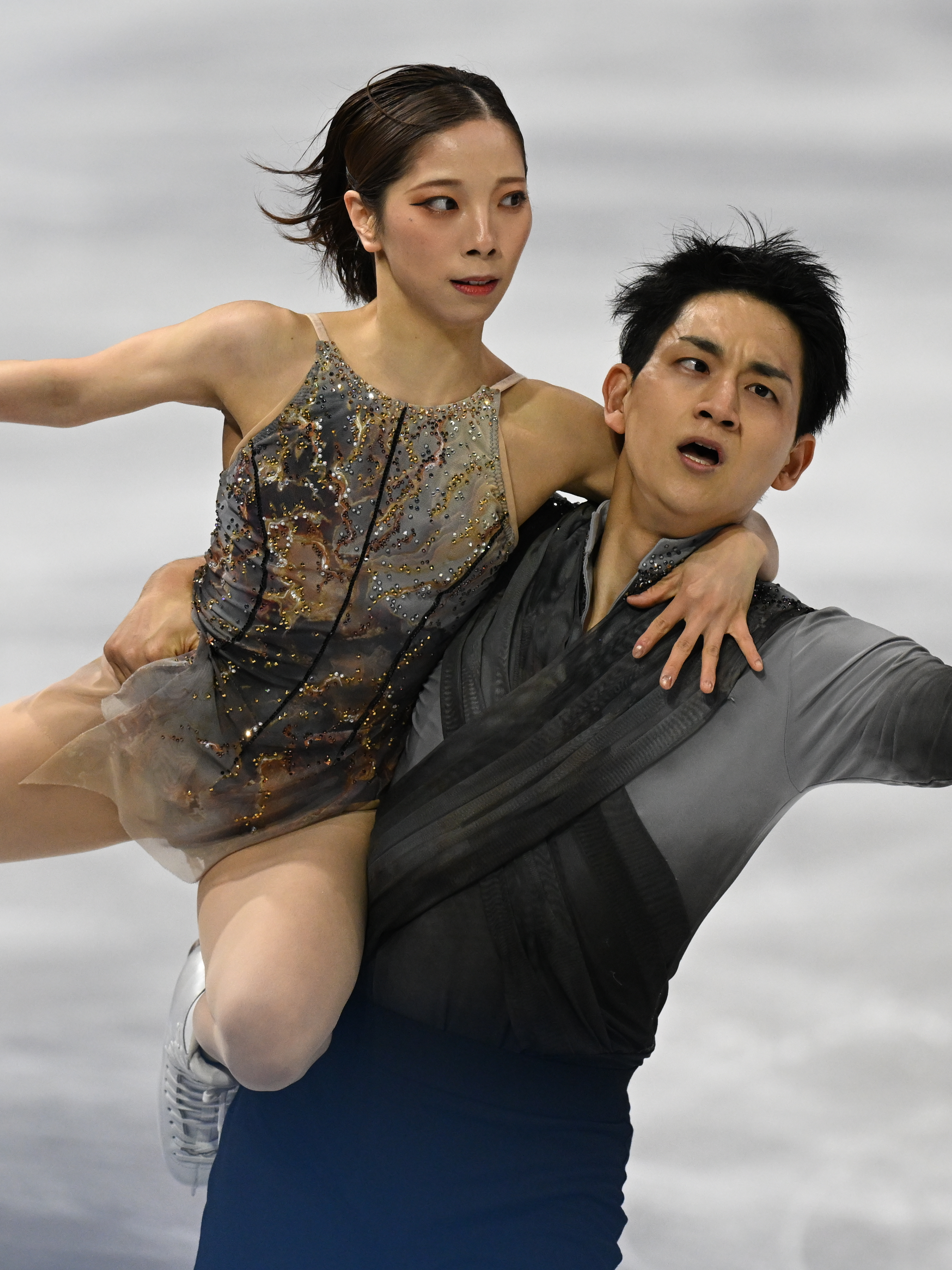
- Miura and Kihara during their free skate at the 2026 Winter Olympics

Personal information
- Native name: 木原 龍一
- Born: August 22, 1992 (age 34) Ichinomiya, Aichi, Japan
- Home town: Oakville, Ontario, Canada
- Height: 175 cm (5 ft 9 in)

Figure skating career
- Country: Japan
- Discipline: Pair skating
- Partner: Riku Miura (since 2019); Miu Suzaki (2015–19); Narumi Takahashi (2013–15)
- Coach: Bruno Marcotte; Meagan Duhamel
- Skating club: Kinoshita Club
- Began skating: 1996
- Retired: April 17, 2026

Medal record
Event	Gold medal – first place	Silver medal – second place	Bronze medal – third place
Olympic Games	1	2	0
World Championships	2	2	0
Four Continents Championships	2	1	0
Grand Prix Final	2	1	0
Japan Championships	6	1	1
World Team Trophy	0	1	2
Medal list
Olympic Games
Gold medal – first place	2026 Milano Cortina	Pairs
Silver medal – second place	2022 Beijing	Team
Silver medal – second place	2026 Milano Cortina	Team
World Championships
Gold medal – first place	2023 Saitama	Pairs
Gold medal – first place	2025 Boston	Pairs
Silver medal – second place	2022 Montpellier	Pairs
Silver medal – second place	2024 Montreal	Pairs
Four Continents Championships
Gold medal – first place	2023 Colorado Springs	Pairs
Gold medal – first place	2025 Seoul	Pairs
Silver medal – second place	2024 Shanghai	Pairs
Grand Prix Final
Gold medal – first place	2022–23 Turin	Pairs
Gold medal – first place	2025–26 Nagoya	Pairs
Silver medal – second place	2024–25 Grenoble	Pairs
Japan Championships
Gold medal – first place	2013–14 Saitama	Pairs
Gold medal – first place	2014–15 Nagano	Pairs
Gold medal – first place	2017–18 Tokyo	Pairs
Gold medal – first place	2018–19 Osaka	Pairs
Gold medal – first place	2019–20 Tokyo	Pairs
Gold medal – first place	2024–25 Osaka	Pairs
Silver medal – second place	2016–17 Osaka	Pairs
Bronze medal – third place	2015–16 Sapporo	Pairs
World Team Trophy
Silver medal – second place	2025 Tokyo	Team
Bronze medal – third place	2021 Osaka	Team
Bronze medal – third place	2023 Tokyo	Team

Ryuichi Kihara (木原 龍一, Kihara Ryūichi; born August 22, 1992) is a Japanese retired pair skater. He and pair partner, Riku Miura, are the 2026 Olympic pair skating champions, two-time Olympic team event silver medalists (2022 (Note: On January 29, 2024, the CAS disqualified Valieva for four years retroactive to December 25, 2021, for an anti-doping rule violation. On January 30, 2024, the ISU reallocated medals to upgrade the United States to gold and Japan to silver, while downgrading the ROC to bronze.), 2026), two-time World Champions (2023, 2025), two-time World silver medalists (2022, 2024), two-time Four Continents champions (2023, 2025), two-time Grand Prix Final champions (2022–23, 2025–26), eight-time ISU Grand Prix medalists (five golds, two silvers, one bronze), three-time ISU Challenger Series medalists (one gold, two silvers), and two-time Japanese national champions (2019–20, 2024–25).

Miura and Kihara are the first Japanese pair skating team to win gold at an ISU Grand Prix event, an ISU Grand Prix Final, an ISU Championships, and a Winter Olympic Games. They are also one of only few skaters to achieve a Career Golden Slam.

He also previously competed with Narumi Takahashi and Miu Suzaki, representing Japan at the 2014 and 2018 Winter Olympics, respectively.

As a singles skater, he is a two-time bronze medalist on the ISU Junior Grand Prix series and the 2010–11 Japanese Junior silver medalist.

== Personal life ==
Kihara was born on August 22, 1992, in Ichinomiya, Aichi. In addition to figure skating, he enjoys playing baseball in his spare time.

He graduated from Chukyo University's School of Sport Science in 2014.

On 23 August 2026, Kihara announced his engagement with pair partner Riku Miura.

== Career ==
=== Singles skating ===
Kihara began learning to skate in 1996. He finished tenth at the 2011 World Junior Championships. He competed in singles through January 28, 2013.

=== Partnership with Narumi Takahashi ===
On January 30, 2013, the Japanese skating federation confirmed that Kihara would compete in pair skating with Narumi Takahashi, the 2012 World bronze medalist, and they would be coached by Yuka Sato and Jason Dungjen. They trained in Bloomfield Hills, Michigan. They represented Japan together at the 2014 Olympics and placed nineteenth.

The pair split in March 2015.

=== Partnership with Miu Suzaki ===
==== 2015–2016 season: Debut of Suzaki/Kihara ====
In June 2015, Japanese media reported that Kihara had teamed up with former single skater Miu Suzaki, with whom he would continue to train with in Michigan. In December, they received the bronze medal at the Japan Championships. They did not appear internationally in their first season together.

==== 2016–2017 season ====
After winning their first international medal (bronze) at the Asian Open Trophy in early August 2016 in Manila, Suzaki/Kihara took silver at the Japan Championships in December. Ranked twelfth in the short program and fourteenth in the free skate, they finished thirteenth overall at the 2017 Four Continents Championships, held in February in Gangneung, South Korea.

==== 2017–2018 season: Pyeongchang Olympics ====
Suzaki/Kihara began their season with silver at the Asian Open Trophy in August 2017. Making their Grand Prix debut, they finished eighth at the 2017 NHK Trophy in November. They won their first national title at the 2017–18 Japan Championships and were assigned to Japan's lone pairs spot at the 2018 Winter Olympics in PyeongChang. In February, they competed at the Olympics in both the team event and the individual event. They placed 21st in the latter and missed the free skate. They concluded their season at the 2018 World Championships, where they placed 24th, again missing the free skate.

==== 2018–2019 season: End of Suzaki/Kihara ====
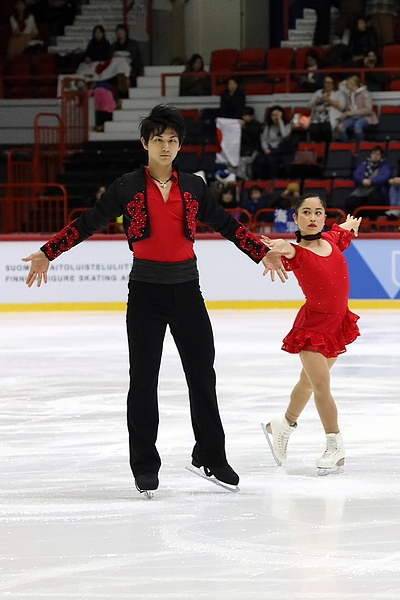
Kihara at the 2018 Grand Prix of Helsinki with Miu Suzaki

In October 2018, Suzaki/Kihara placed tenth at the 2018 CS Finlandia Trophy. They placed eighth at the 2018 Grand Prix Helsinki, their first Grand Prix event of the season. They also placed eighth at the 2018 NHK Trophy, their second assignment. They won a second national title at the 2018–19 Japan Championships. Due to a concussion sustained by Kihara in training, the pair withdrew from the 2019 Four Continents Championships and the home 2019 World Championships in Saitama. They announced the end of their partnership in early April 2019.

=== Partnership with Riku Miura ===
==== 2019–2020 season: Debut of Miura/Kihara ====
Following the end of his partnership with Suzaki, Kihara contemplated retiring from competitive figure skating. In May 2019, however, he was asked to take part in a pair skating seminar, held in Nagoya, at the request of the Japan Skating Federation. There, fellow pair skater, Riku Miura and her coach, Bruno Marcotte, were also in attendance. At the encouragement of Marcotte, Miura and Kihara decided to try skating together and following a successful tryout, they decided to team up. Two weeks later, the pair moved to Oakville, Ontario, Canada to train at the Skate Oakville Skating Club fulltime under Marcotte, Meagan Duhamel, and Brian Shales.

Miura/Kihara made their international competitive debut at 2019 NHK Trophy, where they finished fifth. They were the only pair competing at the 2019–20 Japan Championships and had two falls in the short program. The free skate proved more successful, allowing them to claim the Japanese national title and assignments to the ISU championships in the second half of the season.

After an eighth-place finish at the 2020 Four Continents Championships, Miura/Kihara were assigned to compete at the World Championships in Montreal, but the event was cancelled as a result of the coronavirus pandemic.

==== 2020–2021 season ====
Miura/Kihara was assigned to compete at the 2020 Skate Canada International, but the event was cancelled due to the pandemic. Making their season and Worlds debut at the 2021 World Championships in Stockholm, they placed tenth. As Japan's only pair, they were named to the team for the 2021 World Team Trophy. On April 8, he was named team captain. They finished third in both segments, helping Team Japan to the bronze medal.

==== 2021–2022 season: Beijing Olympics Team Event silver and World silver ====
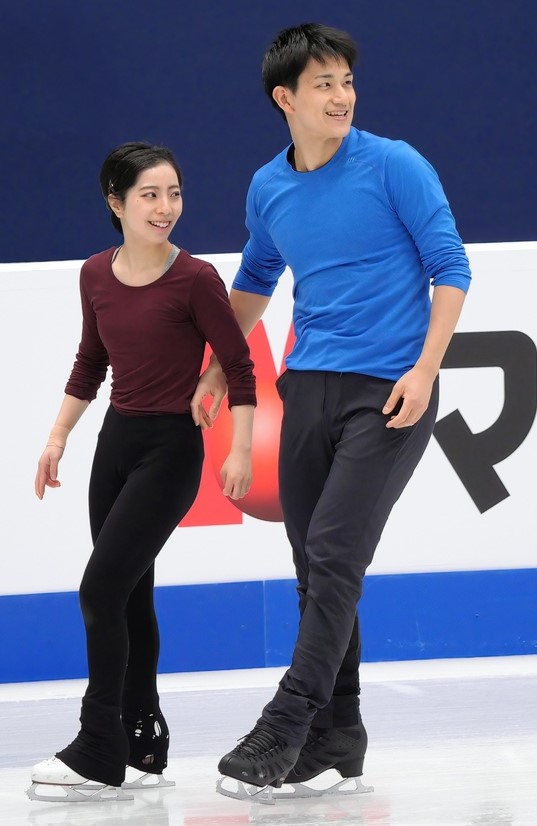
Miura/Kihara during practice at the 2022 World Championships

Miura/Kihara spent the period after the World Team Trophy training in Japan and the United States before returning to Canada in September upon the reopening of the borders. They began their season at the 2021 CS Autumn Classic International, where they won both segments of competition and set new personal bests to take the gold medal overall.

At their first Grand Prix assignment of the season, the 2021 Skate America, Miura/Kihara again scored new personal bests in both segments of competition, as well as overall. Despite placing third in both the short program and the free skate, due to shifting ordinals from their competitors, the team won the silver medal between Russian competitors Tarasova/Morozov in first and Boikova/Kozlovskii in third. Their medal marks the first medal for Japan in the pairs event on the Grand Prix circuit since 2011. Competing at the 2021 NHK Trophy at home for their second event, they were third in both programs to take the bronze medal. They finished less than four points behind silver medalists Tarasova/Morozov, a gap more than accounted for by jump and throw errors by Miura. She noted training issues and expressed dissatisfaction that she had been unable to fix the problem but that they were nevertheless satisfied to have achieved their goal of winning a medal. Miura/Kihara's results qualified them to the Grand Prix Final, but it was subsequently cancelled due to restrictions prompted by the Omicron variant.

Due to the Omicron variant, Miura/Kihara did not travel to Japan to participate in the 2021–22 Japan Championships but were instead named directly to the Japanese Olympic team. They began the 2022 Winter Olympics as the Japanese entries in the Olympic team event. They placed fourth in the short program, securing seven points for the Japanese team. Skating the free segment as well, they finished in second place there, taking nine points for the Japanese team, which went on to win the bronze medal. This was the first time that Japan had taken a medal in the team event, and Miura/Kihara's presence as a strong pair team was widely cited as the biggest factor in Japan's increased competitiveness. In the pairs event, Miura doubled her triple jump attempt in the short program, as a result of which they placed eighth in the segment. In the free skate, they finished fifth in the segment, rising to seventh place overall.

Days after the Olympics concluded, Vladimir Putin ordered an invasion of Ukraine, as a result of which the International Skating Union banned all Russian and Belarusian skaters from competing at the 2022 World Championships. As well, the Chinese Skating Association opted not to send athletes to compete in Montpellier. As those countries' athletes comprised the entirety of the top five pairs at the Olympics, this hugely impacted the field, and Miura/Kihara entered as medal favourites. In the short program, Miura put a hand down after stepping out on their throw triple Lutz, but they finished third in the segment, taking a bronze small medal. They had a rough free skate, with errors on both jumping passes and Miura falling on a throw triple loop. They also finished third in that segment but took the silver medal overall. They became the second Japanese pair team to win a World medal. Miura opined afterward, "now we secure the medal, but I don't think our performance was worth winning a medal today. We regret our performance today, so next season I want to push ourselves hard and to the very end, and we want to practice hard." Their coach, Bruno Marcotte, countered that "I told them to look at their silver medals and think: 'This is the result of all the work you did, all the competitions, the year and a half that you had to stay in Canada, away from your families, because of COVID-19. These medals represent all of that.'"

==== 2022–2023 season: World, Grand Prix Final and Four Continents champions ====
In July, Miura injured her left shoulder while skating in a Japanese ice show during the off-season, which kept the pair from significant training until September. Despite this, Miura/Kihara managed to win gold at their first Grand Prix event, the 2022 Skate Canada International, becoming the first Japanese pair team ever to do so. Their free skate program earned praise from Sleeping at Last, the artist of the program's music. Weeks later, they competed at their second assignment, the 2022 NHK Trophy in Sapporo, winning the short program with a new personal best score, nearly 14 points clear of Americans Chan/Howe in second. They won the free skate by a wide margin, with only two minor errors, winning their second Grand Prix gold and becoming the first Japanese team to win Japan's home Grand Prix event. These results qualified them for the Grand Prix Final.

Miura/Kihara entered the Final in Turin as the top-seeded team and won the short program over American reigning World champions Knierim/Frazier by a 0.43 point margin, with the latter team having a jump error. They won the free skate by a similarly narrow 0.87 point margin after Miura doubled an intended triple toe loop and Kihara put his hand down on their triple Salchow. Kihara lamented the latter mistake, saying it was "the first time in eight years" that he had done so. He added that "we were saved by the power of the audience." They were the first Japanese pair to both medal at and win the Grand Prix Final.

Miura/Kihara were next scheduled to compete at the 2022–23 Japan Championships, but their travel from Canada to Japan was disrupted by the onset of a major winter storm, which resulted in their luggage being lost. Because of their lost skates, they were unable to compete at the championship, though the federation said they would still be considered for international assignments in the second half of the season.

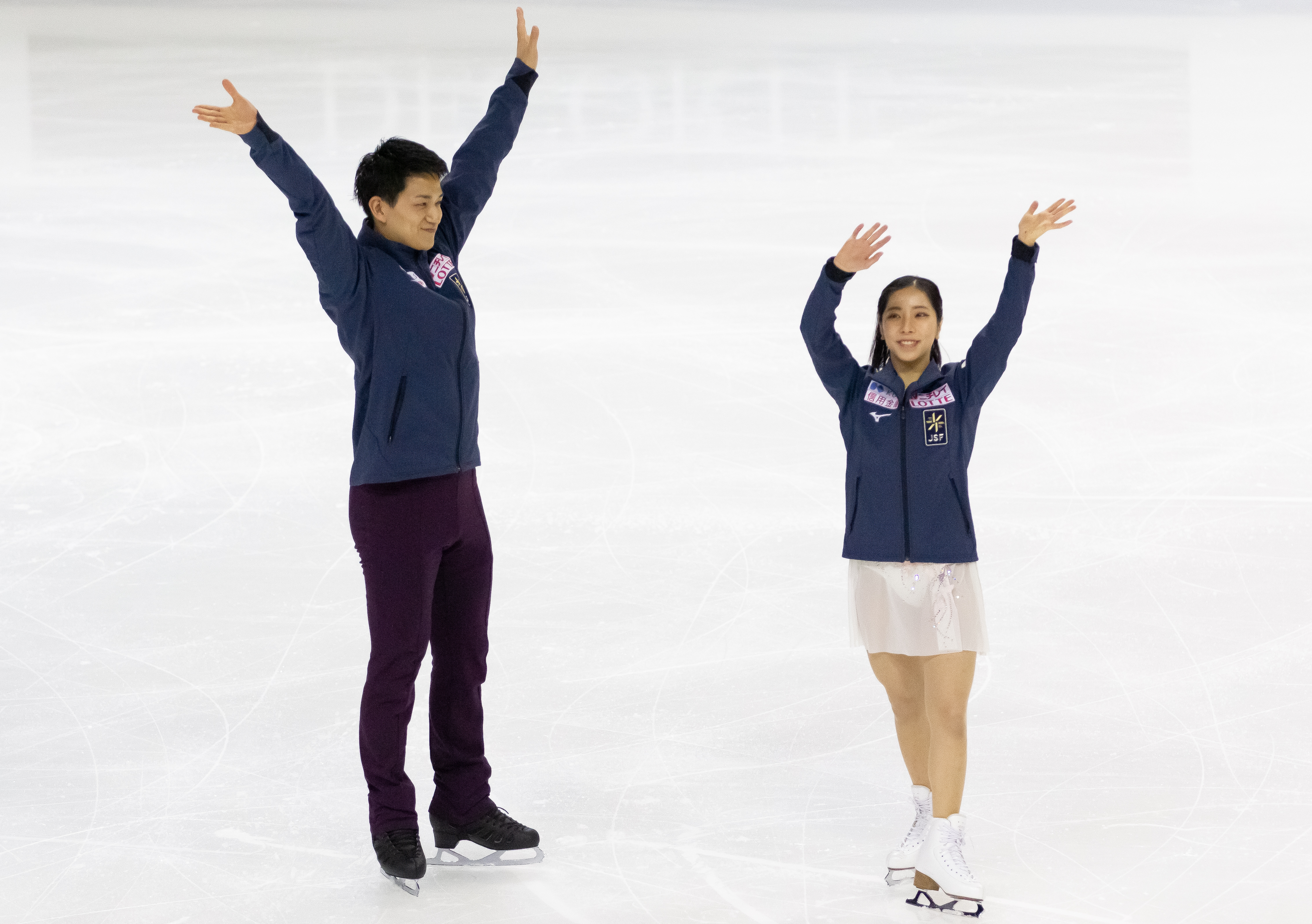
Miura/Kihara at the 2023 Four Continents Championships

With principal rivals Knierim/Frazier not attending the 2023 Four Continents Championships in favour of Art on Ice shows, Miura/Kihara entered the event as heavy favourites for the gold medal. Miura fell on a downgraded triple toe jump attempt in the short program, but the team still won that segment by a margin of 2.80 points over Canadians Stellato/Deschamps. Miura attributed the mistake to nervousness, but said she was pleased that even with the error they had scored over 70 points. Miura/Kihara won the free skate as well, albeit narrowly over Chan/Howe, with some jump errors and Kihara visibly struggling with low oxygen levels due to the high mountain location in Colorado Springs. They won the gold medal, another first for a Japanese pair.

The 2023 World Championships were held on home ice in Saitama, with Miura/Kihara enters as one of the title favourites. They won the short program by a wide margin over Knierim/Frazier, clearing the 80-point threshold for the first time in their careers, which Miura described as "our goal for this season" afterward. They finished second in the free skate, Miura having doubled a planned triple jump and fallen on a throw, but remained comfortably in first place overall and took the gold medal. Miura/Kihara became the first Japanese World pairs champions, as well as the first team to complete the "grand slam" in pairs in almost a decade.

Miura/Kihara joined Team Japan for the 2023 World Team Trophy in Tokyo. They finished second in the short program after Miura had a difficult jump landing. In the free skate, Miura doubled her planned triple jump, and they finished second in that segment as well. Team Japan won the bronze medal overall.

==== 2023–24 season: Injury and World silver medal ====
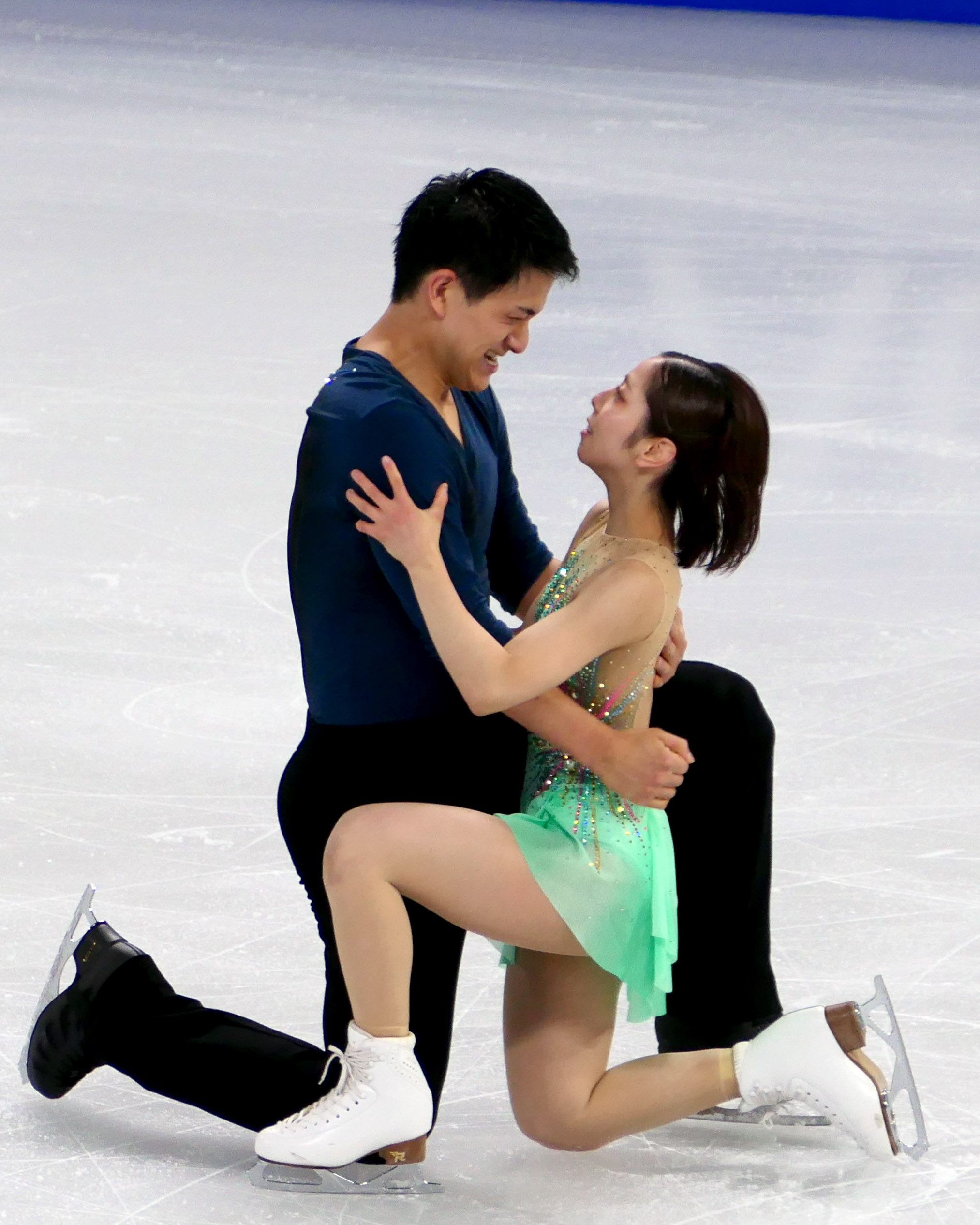
Miura and Kihara during the short program at the 2024 World Championships

Miura/Kihara started the year at the 2023 CS Autumn Classic International, winning the silver medal. However, Kihara began suffering from back pain in August, and he was soon diagnosed with lumbar spondylosis. As a result, the team withdrew from their assignments on the Grand Prix, and subsequently from the 2023–24 Japan Championships.

In December, the team decided to resume training with the goal of making the 2024 Four Continents Championships in Shanghai. They finished second in the short program after Miura doubled her jump and two-footed her throw landing, but having scored 65.61 points, Kihara said they had achieved their own target of hitting 65 points. Miura/Kihara were second in the free skate as well, despite another doubled jump and several other minor errors. They won the silver medal.

At the 2024 World Championships in Montreal, Miura/Kihara had minor errors on their throw and side-by-side jumps that saw them place second in that segment with a score of 73.53, 3.95 points behind leaders Stellato-Dudek/Deschamps of Canada. In the free dance, Miura slightly underrotated a triple toe loop and doubled her planned side-by-side triple Salchow, but they were otherwise clean and finished first in the segment, 0.27 points ahead of Stellato-Dudek/Deschamps. Remaining second overall, they won the silver medal. Shortly following their performance, Kihara began hyperventilating and suffering from a sudden decrease in blood sugar. As a result, Miura/Kihara missed the initial medal ceremony due to Kihara requiring immediate medical attention. After the competition, Kihara was diagnosed with exercise-induced asthma and eventually prescribed medication for the condition.

During the 2024 Paris Olympics, a medal ceremony was held for Miura/Kihara and their teammates from the 2022 Olympic Figure Skating Team Event, where they were awarded their Olympic silver medals.

==== 2024–25 season: World and Four Continents champions ====
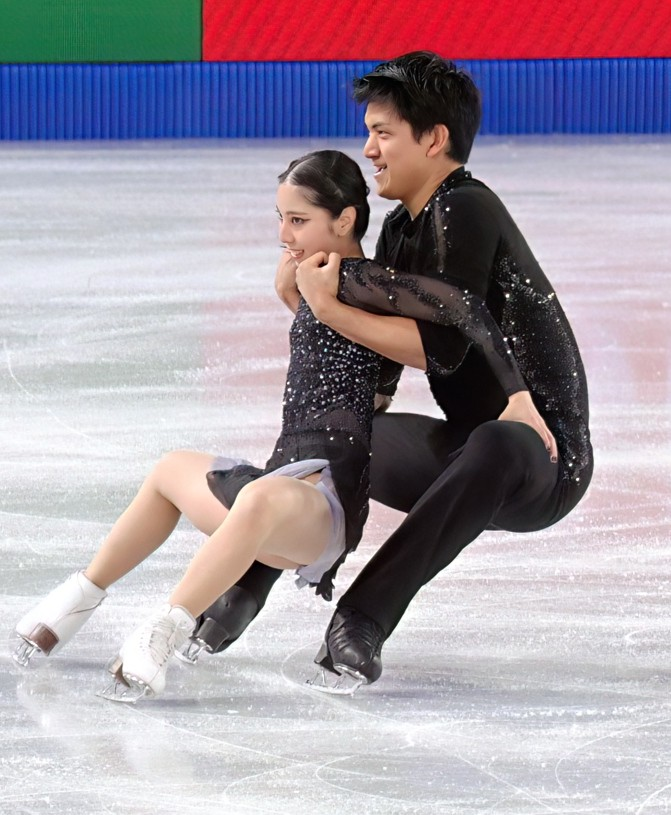
Miura/Kihara performing a Besti squat during their short program at the 2024–25 Grand Prix Final

Miura/Kihara started the season by competing at the 2024 CS Lombardia Trophy. The pair placed second in the short program. However, during their free skate, Kihara slipped while dismounting Miura from a lift, causing him to fall on his back with Miura landing on top of him. The pair placed third in that segment of the competition and finished second overall behind Italian pair team, Sara Conti/Niccolò Macii.

Competing in the 2024–25 Grand Prix series, the pair was awarded the gold medal at 2024 Skate America.

They would then go on to win silver at the 2024 NHK Trophy behind Georgian pair team, Metelkina/Berulava. After the event, Miura said they were happy with their free program as it earned one point more than at 2024 Skate America. During the event's gala exhibition, all members of the 2022 Olympic Team Event, including Miura/Kihara, were invited to center stage, wearing their Olympic costumes and Olympic medals, in celebration of their achievement.

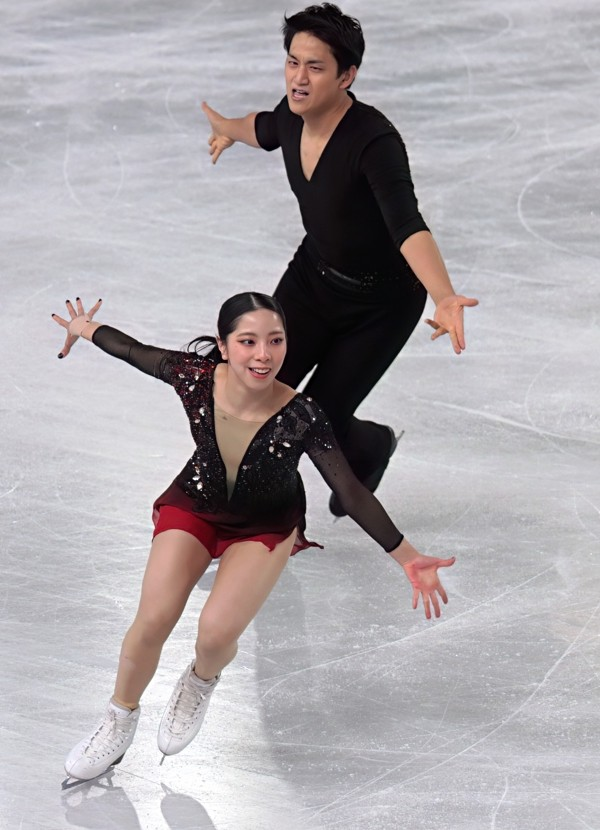
Miura/Kihara performing their free skate at the 2024–25 Grand Prix Final

Miura/Kihara's Grand Prix results allowed them to qualify for the 2024–25 Grand Prix Final in Grenoble, France. At the Final, Miura/Kihara won the silver medal behind Hase/Volodin of Germany. “It’s been two years since we participated in the Final, so we’ve made some mistakes today,” said Kihara after the free skate. “It wasn’t good, but we were able to get 130 points, so I think that’s good. But we will learn from it and improve ourselves to aim for the Olympics.”

Two weeks following the event, they won their second national title at the 2024–25 Japan Championships.

At the 2025 Four Continents Championships in Seoul, Miura/Kihara won the short program with a clean skate. They went on to win the free skate as well, despite Miura struggling on both throw landings and singling an Axel jump, and won their second event title. Kihara reflected on the five years since their first appearance at Four Continents in the same arena, saying that at that time "we couldn't even picture ourselves being in this position. We had to overcome many challenges, and we were able to achieve these results."

Going on to compete at the 2025 World Championships in Boston, Massachusetts, United States the following month, Miura/Kihara skated a solid short program, winning the segment, less than two points ahead of the team in second place, Conti/Macii. The pair went on to place second in the free skate segment behind Hase/Volodin due to Miura two-footing both pair throw landings, however their short program lead was enough to keep Miura/Kihara in first place overall, thus winning their second World title. In an interview following the event, Miura shared, "There were small mistakes, but I’m very happy to be here and of course to win the second world title. The first title two years ago was just happiness, but in the last two years, we had very hard times, we had injury problems, we went through many emotions, and we also have many emotions right now. But still, in the end, we are still very happy."

Selected to compete for Team Japan at the 2025 World Team Trophy, Miura/Kihara won all segments of the pair's event, scoring personal bests in the process and aiding Team Japan in finishing second overall. “We had a very hard season, especially in the first half, but because of that experience, we want to enjoy our Olympic year," said Kihara. "We are kind of thankful for the hard experience we went through.”

==== 2025–26 season: Milano Cortina Olympic Pairs champions, Olympic Team Event silver, Grand Prix Final champions, and retirement ====
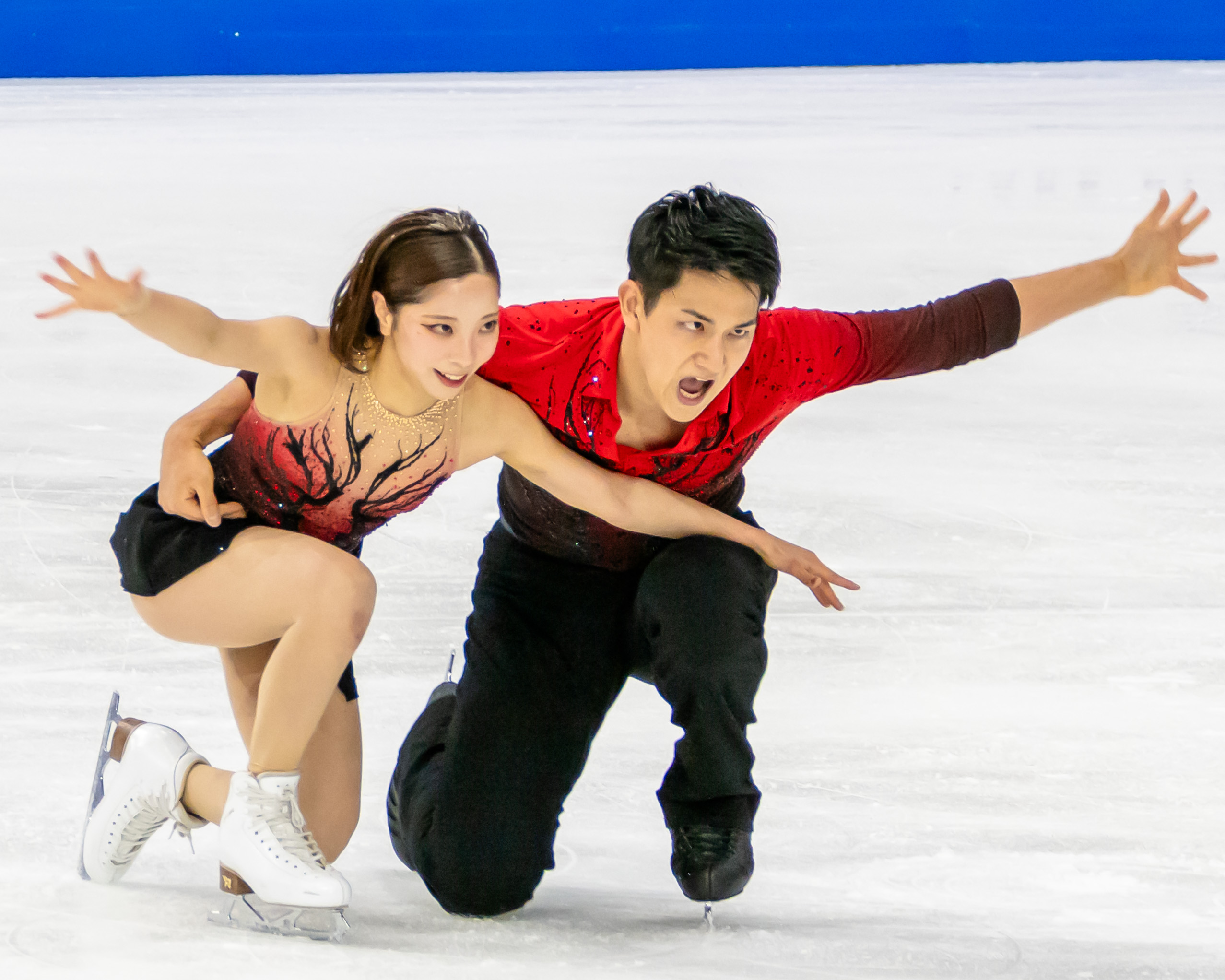
Miura and Kihara finishing their short program at 2025 Skate America

Miura/Kihara opened the season with a win at an ISU Challenger Series at 2025 CS Kinoshita Group Cup in September. They took the silver at 2025 CS Nebelhorn Trophy a few weeks later. Together they won their fourth ISU Grand Prix of Figure Skating gold at 2025 Grand Prix de France. "In our last competition, we had two mistakes in the second half of the program, and today we were able to land those two elements cleanly," Miura said after the free skate.

The following month, Miura/Kihara won their second consecutive Skate America title at 2025 Skate America, qualifying for the 2025-26 Grand Prix Final. The team place second in the short program and first in the free skate. “We did end up making a small mistake, but I’m still very proud of ourselves for achieving scores in the 140s," said Miura after the free skate. "I think that is going to make way for more confidence in future competitions."

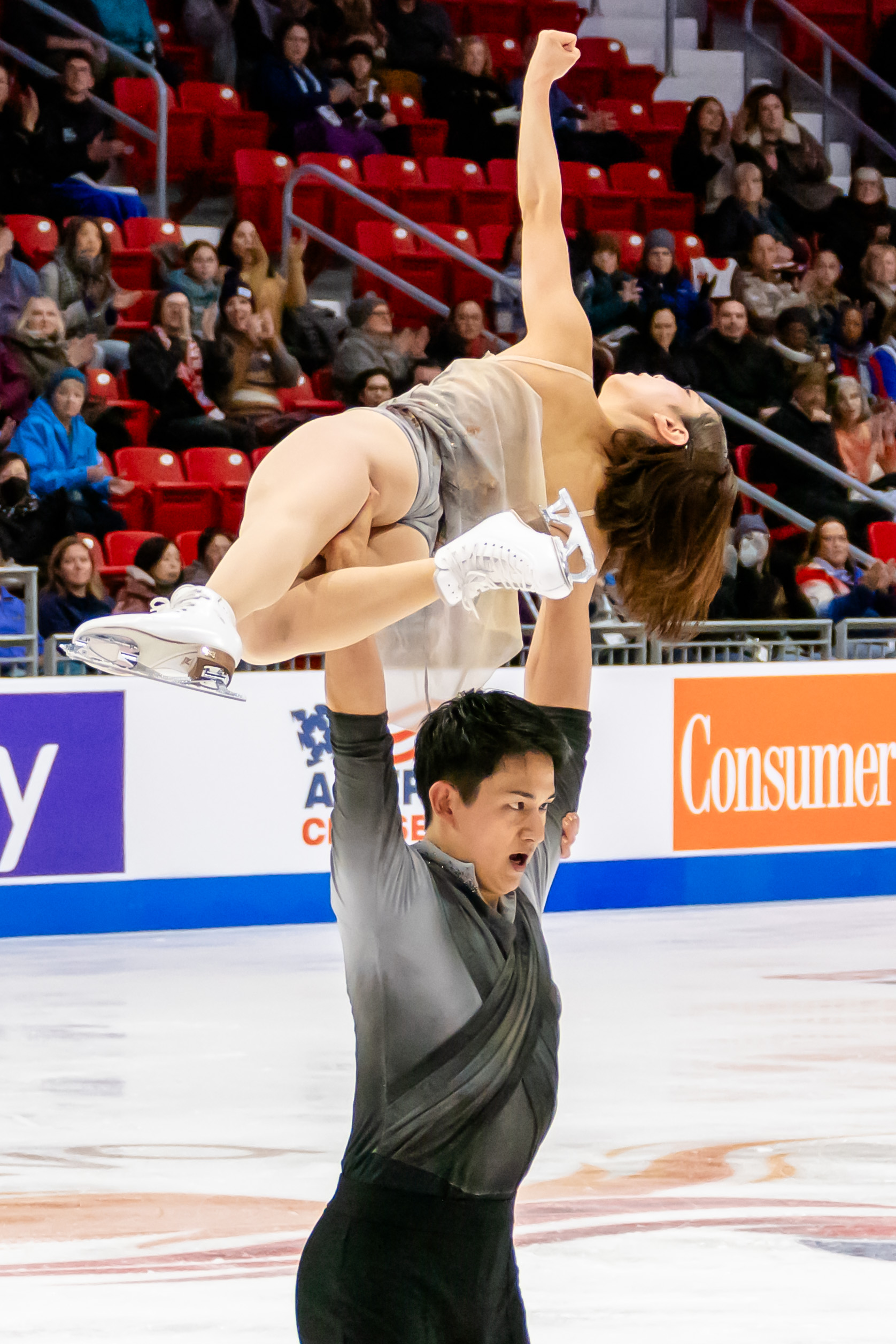
Miura and Kihara doing their free skate ending pose at 2025 Skate America

Miura/Kihara competed at the 2025–26 Grand Prix Final the following month, placing first in the short program. They finished second in the free skate with a new personal best score behind Germany's Hase and Volodin but won the event overall to take their second Grand Prix Final title. Miura said that she was happy to have won in her home country and added, "I couldn’t have finished the competition without the warm cheers of the audience. I’m grateful to everyone who always supports us." Two weeks later, they went on to compete at the 2025–26 Japan Championships. During the short program warm-up, Miura dislocated her shoulder. In spite of this, the pair went on to complete their short program, winning that segment of the competition but withdrawing before the free skate to focus on Miura's recovery. Following the event, Miura/Kihara were officially named to the 2026 Winter Olympic team.

On February 6, Miura/Kihara competed in the 2026 Winter Olympics Figure Skating Team Event where they placed first in the short program with a new personal best score. "We were able to show the results of our practice today, so I’m very happy," said Miura. "This is our second Olympics, and over the past four years we’ve had injuries, but those experiences made us stronger than before. We’re really proud of that!" Two days later, they won the free skate segment with another personal best score, helping secure Team Japan an Olympic silver medal for a second consecutive time.

On February 15, Miura/Kihara competed in the short program in the Pairs event. During their performance, the pair made an unexpected mistake on their group 5 Axel lift where Kihara put Miura down too early due to each of their timing being off. As a result, the lift only received a level 2 with negative grade of execution reflected in their scores. The mistake proved costly as Miura/Kihara were placed fifth, 6.90 points out of first. "It wasn't a small mistake... It can't be helped," said Kihara following their performance. "There's nothing to do now but to face ahead. The competition isn't over yet. There are still things we have to do. I just don't understand why it happened, though." Miura added, "We just have to take things step by step. We made a mistake today. So we reset. We can do it if we believe that we can. We'll reset and do our best tomorrow."

The following day, Miura/Kihara delivered a flawless free skate, achieving a personal best, and breaking the world record for a pairs free skate score that had previously been held by Anastasia Mishina and Aleksandr Galliamov from the 2022 European Championships. With their combined total score, Miura/Kihara were able to move into first place, winning Japan's first ever pair skating gold medal.

"I honestly have nothing but words of gratitude," Kihara expressed. "Yesterday, we thought a comeback was still possible. The encouragement of those words helped me turn my mindset forward. I'm truly thankful to everyone." He added, "I couldn't stop crying today. I was so frustrated, I couldn't sleep last night... I couldn't stop my tears since I arrived at the rink, even at practice, from warm-up. It was a feeling I didn't understand, something I never experienced before. But the messages I got from people, and our coach, lifted me up again... This is the place where we fight. There's no way we could give up at these Olympics. We told ourselves we would absolutely attack until the very end. I had been crying since morning, but unlike me, Riku was really strong today. Before the competition, I reset mentally and told the team I was okay."

Miura reacted by saying, "In the past, I wouldn't have been able to be this strong. It's because of all the work we built together, and the support he's given me through every competition, that I was able to become strong at this event... Ryuichi's disappointment was really strong, so instead, I shifted into the role of supporting him. I didn't fall that much emotionally. We still had the free program, and in the team event, we were able to score 150. I kept thinking that if we skated without mistakes, we still had a chance." Following this win, Miura/Kihara achieved a Career Golden Slam, becoming only the second Japanese skaters to do so after Yuzuru Hanyu.

A couple weeks after their Olympic win, Miura/Kihara announced that they would not compete at the 2026 World Championships due to feeling that they would be unable to mentally and physically prepare for the event on time. They also stated that they would make an announcement regarding their future plans following the end of the season.

On April 17, 2026, Miura/Kihara announced their retirement from competitive figure skating.

== Post-competitive career ==
Following their retirement announcement, Miura/Kihara expressed their desire to become pair skating coaches with the goal of promoting the discipline in Japan and helping nurture the next generation of Japanese pair skating. "When you want to learn pairs skating, the first place you have to go is overseas," stated Kihara. "I think that if we can one day teach what pairs skating is in Japan, we can eliminate one of the factors that makes pairs skating difficult. Miura understands a lot more about the women's part than I do. Rather than coaching alone, I want to coach together as a team."

In May 2026, it was announced that Miura/Kihara had produced their own ice show called "THE DESTINY," featuring a cast of the world's top-ranking pair skating and ice dance teams.

== Honours and awards ==
- Aichi Prefecture Sports Achievement Award (2022)
- Hyogo Prefecture Sports Award: Special Athlete Award (2022)
- Inspirational Osaka Award (2022)
- Japanese Olympic Committee, JOC Sports Award: Excellence Award (2022)
- Japanese Olympic Committee, JOC Sports Award: Special Award (2026)
- Japan Skating Federation: JOC Cup MVP Award (2022)
- Mayor's Key to the town of Oakville, Ontario, Canada honoured by Mayor Rob Burton on 19 March 2026.
- TV Asahi: Big Sports Special Award (2022)
- TV Asahi: Big Sports Award (2023)

== World record scores ==
Combined total records
Disc.	Segment	Score	Event	Date	Ref.
Pairs	Free skate	158.13	2026 Winter Olympics	February 16, 2026	

== Programs ==
=== Pair skating with Riku Miura ===
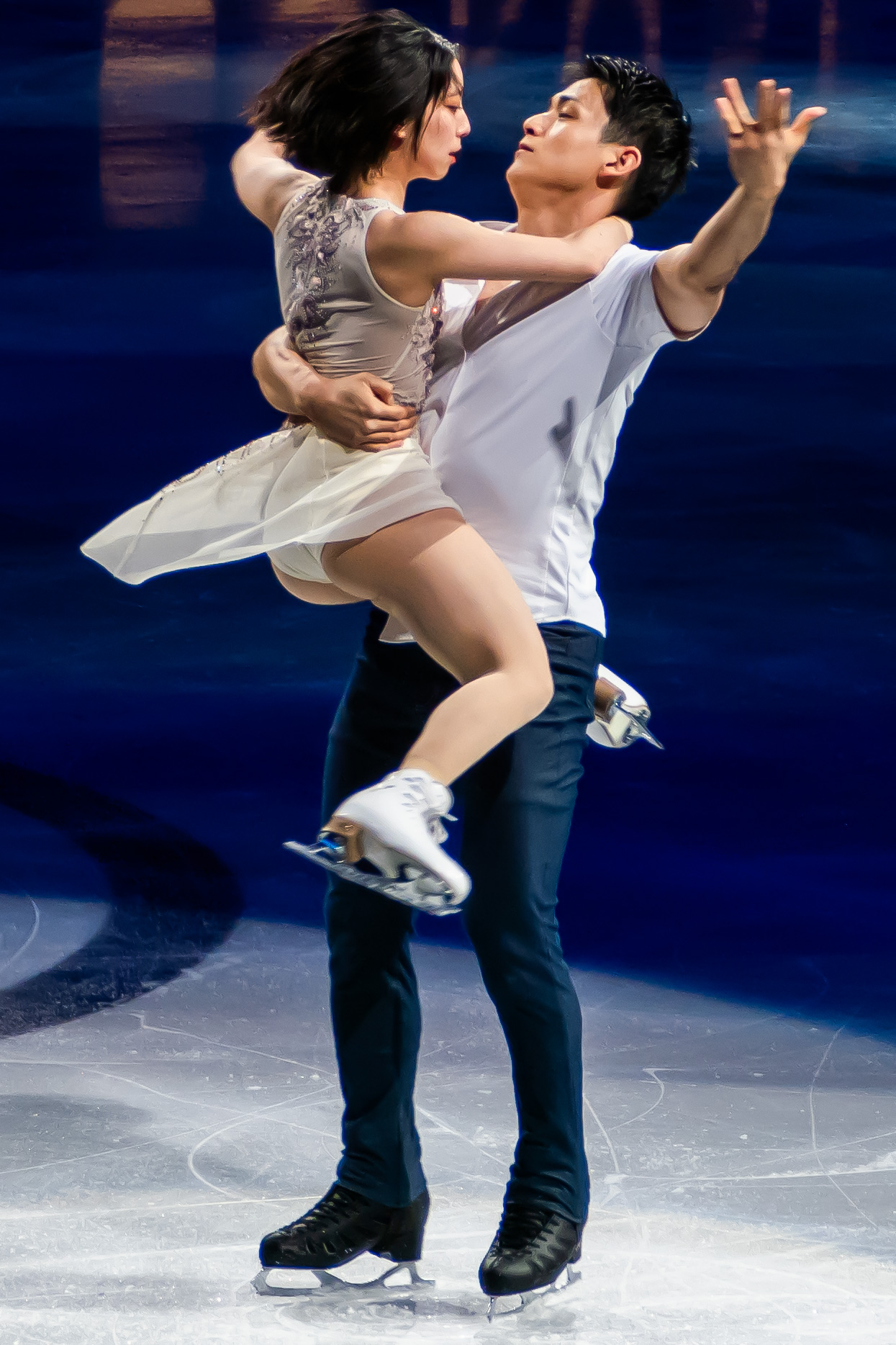
Miura and Kihara performing in the gala at the 2025 World Championships

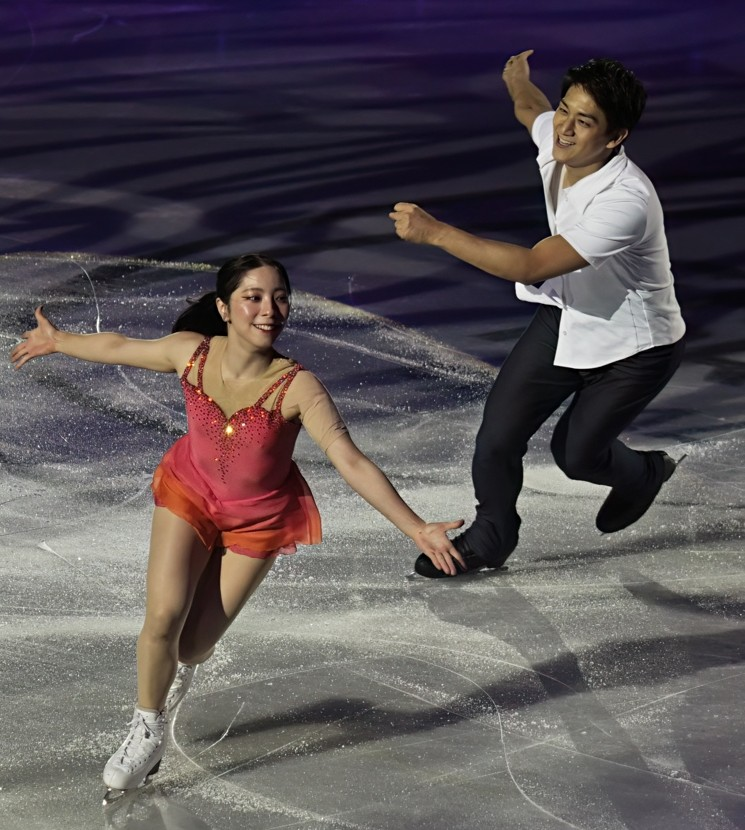
Miura and Kihara during their exhibition program at the 2024–25 Grand Prix Final

Season	Short program	Free skating	Exhibition
2025–2026	Paint It Black by The Rolling Stones performed by Wednesday Addams & Sebastian Böhm choreo. by Shae-Lynn Bourne	Strength and Honor (from Gladiator II) by Harry Gregson-Williams; Nelle tue mani (Now We Are Free) (from Gladiator) by Lisa Gerrard & Hans Zimmer performed by Andrea Bocelli choreo. by Marie-France Dubreuil	Can't Stop the Feeling! by Justin Timberlake
2024–2025	Paint It Black by The Rolling Stones performed by Wednesday Addams & Sebastian Böhm choreo. by Shae-Lynn Bourne	Adiós by Benjamin Clementine choreo. by Marie-France Dubreuil	Can't Stop the Feeling! by Justin Timberlake
2023–2024	Dare You to Move by Switchfoot performed by Vitamin String Quartet choreo. by Julie Marcotte; I Put a Spell on You by Screamin' Jay Hawkins & Herb Slotkin performed by Kandace Springs choreo. by Julie Marcotte	Woman by Shawn Phillips choreo. by Julie Marcotte; Une chance qu'on s'a by Celine Dion & Jean-Pierre Ferland; Amour infini by Karl Hugo choreo. by Julie Marcotte	You'll Never Walk Alone by Richard Rodgers & Oscar Hammerstein II performed by Marcus Mumford & Elvis Presley choreo. by Julie Marcotte
2022–2023	You'll Never Walk Alone by Richard Rodgers & Oscar Hammerstein II performed by Marcus Mumford & Elvis Presley choreo. by Julie Marcotte	Atlas: Two by Sleeping at Last choreo. by Julie Marcotte	Hallelujah by Leonard Cohen performed by k.d. lang choreo. by Julie Marcotte; I Lived; by OneRepublic
2021–2022	Hallelujah by Leonard Cohen performed by k.d. lang choreo. by Julie Marcotte	Woman by Shawn Phillips choreo. by Julie Marcotte	I Lived by OneRepublic
2020–2021	Hallelujah by Leonard Cohen performed by k.d. lang choreo. by Julie Marcotte	Woman by Shawn Phillips choreo. by Julie Marcotte	Million Reasons by Lady Gaga
2019–2020	Nocturnal Animals by Abel Korzeniowski choreo. by Allie Hann-McCurdy	Fix You by Coldplay choreo. by Valérie Saurette	Million Reasons by Lady Gaga

=== Pair skating with Miu Suzaki ===
Season	Short program	Free skating	Exhibition
2018–2019	Malagueña by Ernesto Lecuona choreo. by Pasquale Camerlengo	Turn to Stone by Ingrid Michaelson choreo. by Yuka Sato, Jeremy Abbott	Yuri on Ice by Taro Umebayashi
2017–2018	Yuri on Ice by Taro Umebayashi choreo. by Yuka Sato	Romeo and Juliet by Nino Rota choreo. by Pasquale Camerlengo	Yuri on Ice by Taro Umebayashi
2016–2017	Out of the Garage by Daniel Pemberton; Mission: Impossible choreo. by Yuka Sato	Star Wars by John Williams choreo. by Yuka Sato; Duel of the Fates; Across the Stars	Mission: Impossible choreo. by Yuka Sato
2015–2016	Let it go choreo. by Yuka Sato	Star Wars by John Williams choreo. by Yuka Sato; Duel of the Fates; Across the Stars	Move Together

=== Pair skating with Narumi Takahashi ===
Season	Short program	Free skating
2014–2015	Bossa Nova Baby by Elvis Presley	That's Entertainment; Love is Here to Stay; I'll Build a Stairway to Paradise
2013–2014	Samson and Delilah by Camille Saint-Saëns	Les Misérables by Claude-Michel Schönberg

=== Men's singles ===
Season	Short program	Free skating
2012–2013	The Phantom of the Opera by Andrew Lloyd Webber	Violin Concerto by Pyotr Tchaikovsky
2011–2012	Tango De Los Exilados by Walter Taieb	Violin Concerto by Pyotr Tchaikovsky
2010–2011	Tango De Los Exilados by Walter Taieb	The Man in the Iron Mask by Nick Glennie-Smith
2009–2010	Speed by Mark Mancina	The Man in the Iron Mask by Nick Glennie-Smith

== Competitive highlights ==
- GP – Event of the ISU Grand Prix Series
- JGP – Event of the ISU Junior Grand Prix Series
- CS – Event of the ISU Challenger Series
- TBD – Assigned
- WD – Withdrew from competition
- C – Event was cancelled
- Medals at team events are awarded for the team results only. Individual placements at team events are listed in parentheses.

=== Pair skating with Riku Miura ===
Competition placements at senior level
Season	2019–20	2020–21	2021–22	2022–23	2023–24	2024–25	2025–26
Winter Olympics			7th				1st
Winter Olympics (Team event)			2nd				2nd
World Championships	C	10th	2nd	1st	2nd	1st	
Four Continents Championships	8th			1st	2nd	1st	
Grand Prix Final			C	1st		2nd	1st
Japan Championships	1st					1st	WD
World Team Trophy		3rd (3rd)		3rd (2nd)		2nd (1st)	
GP France							1st
GP NHK Trophy	5th		3rd	1st		2nd	
GP Skate America			2nd			1st	1st
GP Skate Canada				1st			
CS Autumn Classic			1st		2nd		
CS Kinoshita Group Cup							1st
CS Lombardia Trophy						2nd	
CS Nebelhorn Trophy							2nd

=== Pair skating with Miu Suzaki ===
International
Event	15–16	16–17	17–18	18–19
Olympics			21st	
Worlds			24th	
Four Continents		13th	8th	
GP Finland				8th
GP NHK Trophy			8th	8th
CS Finlandia Trophy				10th
Asian Open Trophy		3rd	2nd	
National
Japan Champ.	3rd	2nd	1st	1st
Team events
Olympics			5th T	

=== Pair skating with Narumi Takahashi ===
International
Event	13–14	14–15
Olympics	18th	
Worlds	17th	19th
Four Continents		10th
GP Rostelecom Cup	8th	7th
GP NHK Trophy	8th	7th
CS Autumn Classic		9th
CS Nebelhorn Trophy	11th	7th
Lombardia Trophy	7th	
National
Japan Championships	1st	1st
Team events
Winter Olympics	5th T	

=== Single skating ===
International
Event	04–05	06–07	07–08	08–09	09–10	10–11	11–12	12–13
Challenge Cup							7th	
NRW Trophy								16th
International: Junior
Junior Worlds						10th		
JGP Austria						10th		
JGP Belarus					9th			
JGP Estonia							4th	
JGP Germany						3rd		
JGP Poland							3rd	
New Zealand WG					2nd J			
National
Japan						12th	12th	12th
Japan Junior	28th	17th	16th	9th	8th	2nd	3rd	

== Detailed results ==
=== Pair skating with Riku Miura ===
ISU personal best scores in the +5/-5 GOE System
Segment	Type	Score	Event
Total	TSS	231.24	2026 Winter Olympics
Short program	TSS	82.84	2026 Winter Olympics (Team event)
Short program	TES	45.60	2026 Winter Olympics (Team event)
Short program	PCS	37.24	2026 Winter Olympics (Team event)
Free skating	TSS	158.13	2026 Winter Olympics
Free skating	TES	82.73	2026 Winter Olympics
Free skating	PCS	75.40	2026 Winter Olympics

- Small medals for the short program and free skating are only awarded at ISU Championships.
- Medals at team events are awarded for the team results only. Individual placements at team events are listed in parentheses.

Results in the 2019–20 season
Date	Event	SP		FS		Total	
Date	Event	P	Score	P	Score	P	Score
Nov 22–24, 2019	(Japan) 2019 NHK Trophy	6	62.41	6	117.53	5	179.94
Dec 18–22, 2019	2019–20 Japan Championships	1	53.95	1	116.16	1	170.11
Feb 4–9, 2020	(South Korea) 2020 Four Continents Championships	9	57.45	8	110.05	8	167.50

Results in the 2020–21 season
Date	Event	SP		FS		Total	
Date	Event	P	Score	P	Score	P	Score
Mar 22–28, 2021	(Sweden) 2021 World Championships	8	64.37	10	120.04	10	184.41
Apr 15–18, 2021	(Japan) 2021 World Team Trophy	3	65.82	3	130.83	3 (3)	196.65

Results in the 2021–22 season
Date	Event	SP		FS		Total	
Date	Event	P	Score	P	Score	P	Score
Sep 16–18, 2021	(Canada) 2021 CS Autumn Classic International	1	72.32	1	131.74	1	204.06
Oct 22–24, 2021	(United States) 2021 Skate America	3	72.63	3	135.57	2	208.20
Nov 12–14, 2021	(Japan) 2021 NHK Trophy	3	73.98	3	135.44	3	209.42
Feb 4–7, 2022	(China) 2022 Winter Olympics (Team event)	4	74.45	2	139.60	2	–
Feb 18–19, 2022	(China) 2022 Winter Olympics	8	70.85	5	141.04	7	211.89
Mar 21–27, 2022	(France) 2022 World Championships	3	71.58	3	127.97	2	199.55

Results in the 2022–23 season
Date	Event	SP		FS		Total	
Date	Event	P	Score	P	Score	P	Score
Oct 28–30, 2022	2022 Skate Canada International	1	73.39	1	138.63	1	212.02
Nov 17–20, 2022	(Japan) 2022 NHK Trophy	1	78.25	1	137.91	1	216.16
Dec 8–11, 2022	(Italy) 2022–23 Grand Prix Final	1	78.08	1	136.50	1	214.58
Feb 7–12, 2023	(United States) 2023 Four Continents Championships	1	71.19	1	137.05	1	208.24
Mar 20–26, 2023	(Japan) 2023 World Championships	1	80.72	2	141.44	1	222.16
Apr 13–16, 2023	(Japan) 2023 World Team Trophy	2	80.47	2	143.69	3 (2)	224.16

Results in the 2023–24 season
Date	Event	SP		FS		Total	
Date	Event	P	Score	P	Score	P	Score
Sep 14–16, 2023	(Canada) 2023 CS Autumn Classic International	2	59.13	2	128.92	2	188.05
Jan 30 – Feb 4, 2024	(China) 2024 Four Continents Championships	2	65.61	3	125.16	2	190.77
Mar 18–24, 2024	(Canada) 2024 World Championships	2	73.53	1	144.35	2	217.88

Results in the 2024–25 season
Date	Event	SP		FS		Total	
Date	Event	P	Score	P	Score	P	Score
Sep 13–15, 2024	(Italy) 2024 CS Lombardia Trophy	2	73.53	3	126.02	2	199.55
Oct 18–20, 2024	(United States) 2024 Skate America	1	77.79	1	136.44	1	214.23
Nov 8–10, 2024	(Japan) 2024 NHK Trophy	1	71.90	2	137.55	2	209.45
Dec 5–8, 2024	(France) 2024–25 Grand Prix Final	2	76.27	3	130.44	2	206.71
Dec 19–22, 2024	2024–25 Japan Championships	1	74.16	1	138.17	1	212.33
Feb 19–23, 2025	(South Korea) 2025 Four Continents Championships	1	74.73	1	142.59	1	217.32
Mar 25–30, 2025	(United States) 2025 World Championships	1	76.57	2	143.22	1	219.79
Apr 17–20, 2025	(Japan) 2025 World Team Trophy	1	80.99	1	145.06	2 (1)	226.05

Results in the 2025–26 season
Date	Event	SP		FS		Total	
Date	Event	P	Score	P	Score	P	Score
Sep 5–7, 2025	(Japan) 2025 CS Kinoshita Group Cup	1	79.94	1	143.00	1	222.94
Sep 25–27, 2025	(Germany) 2025 CS Nebelhorn Trophy	1	78.19	2	142.84	2	221.03
Oct 17–19, 2025	2025 Grand Prix de France	1	79.44	1	139.71	1	219.15
Nov 14–26, 2025	(United States) 2025 Skate America	2	74.42	1	141.57	1	215.99
Dec 4–7, 2025	(Japan) 2025–26 Grand Prix Final	1	77.32	2	147.89	1	225.21
Dec 18–21, 2025	2025–26 Japan Championships	1	84.91	—N/a	—N/a	WD	—N/a
Feb 6–8, 2026	(Italy) 2026 Winter Olympics – Team event	1	82.84	1	155.55	2	—N/a
Feb 6–19, 2026	(Italy) 2026 Winter Olympics	5	73.11	1	158.13	1	231.24
