= Besti squat =

Figure skating move

Figure skating element
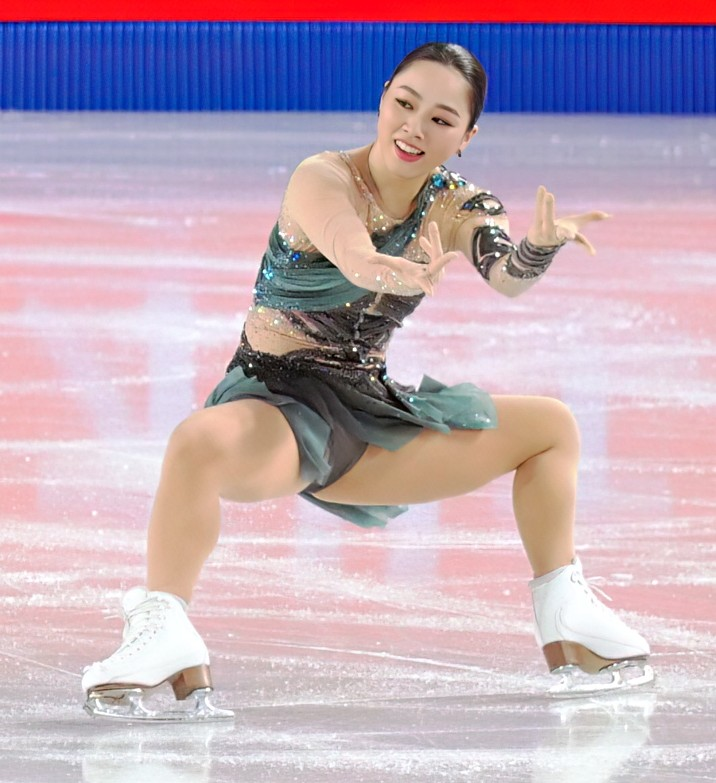
- Element name: Besti squat
- Element type: Moves in the field

A Besti squat is a figure skating move. It is similar to the spread eagle in that the skater travels along an edge with both skates on the ice, the toes turned out to the sides and the heels facing each other. The knees are bent outwards into a squatting position with the thighs held parallel to the ice and the torso kept upright. In ballet terminology, it is a plié with the feet in second position.

The move is unofficially named after Natalia Bestemianova, who performed the move repeatedly in her 1988 free dance with Andrei Bukin.

== Gallery ==
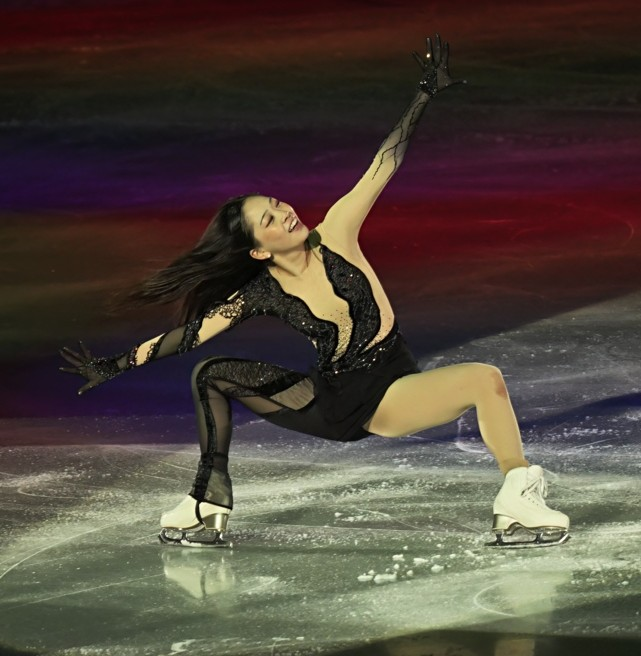
A full-frontal view of a solo Besti squat
(Hana Yoshida)

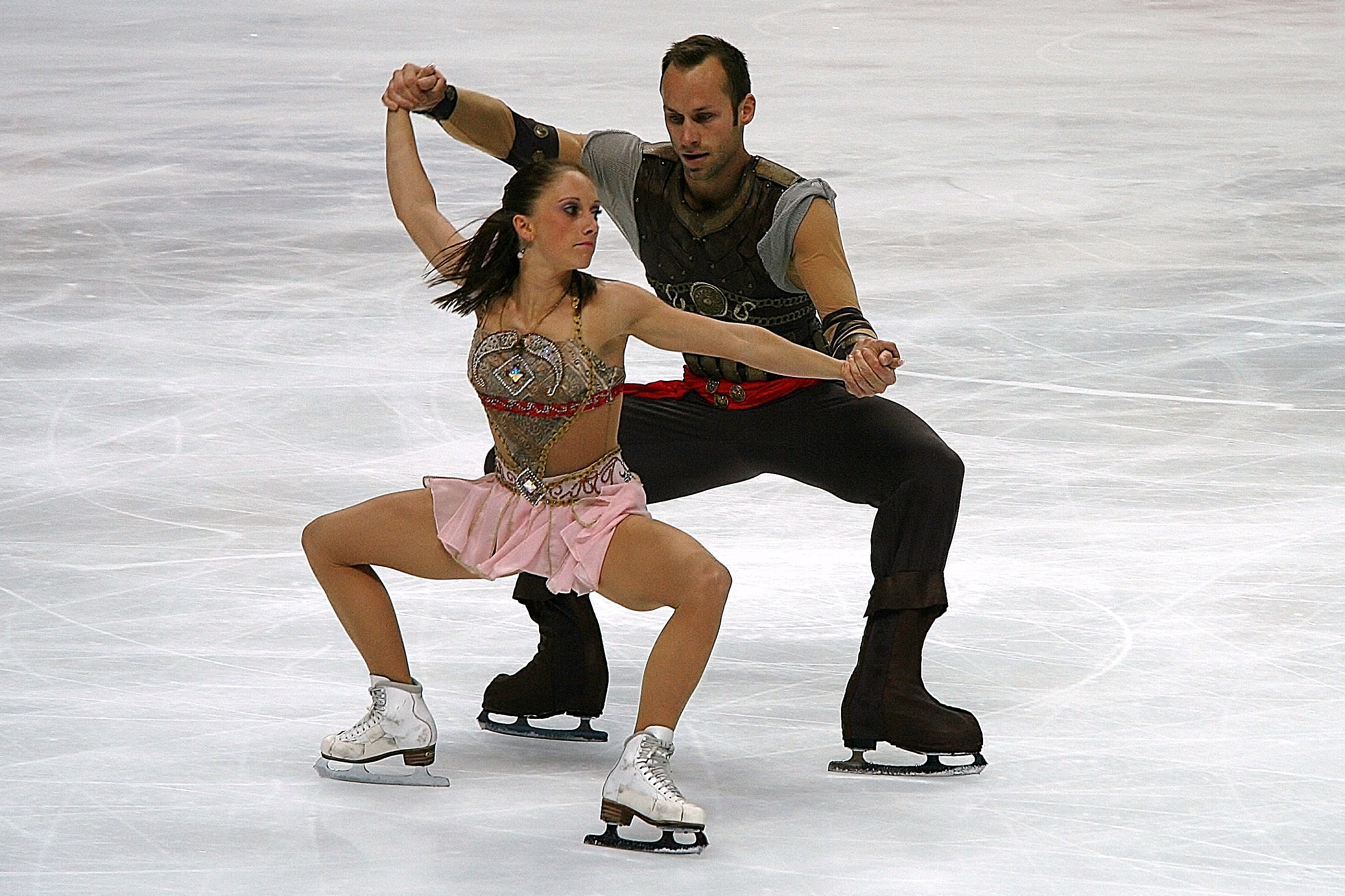
A pair team perform Besti squats during the 2011 World Figure Skating Championships
(Maylin Hausch & Daniel Wende)

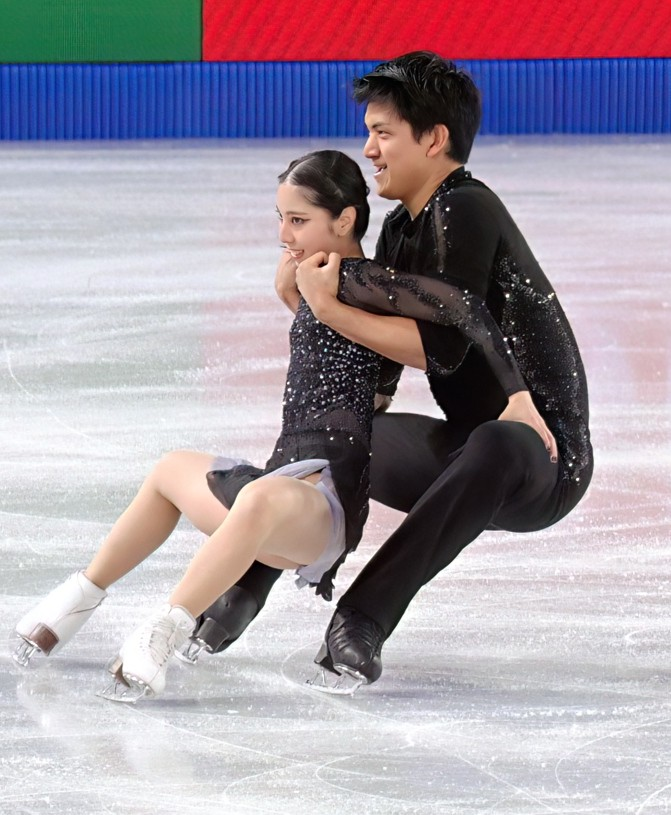
A pair team perform Besti squats in close contact
(Riku Miura & Ryuichi Kihara)

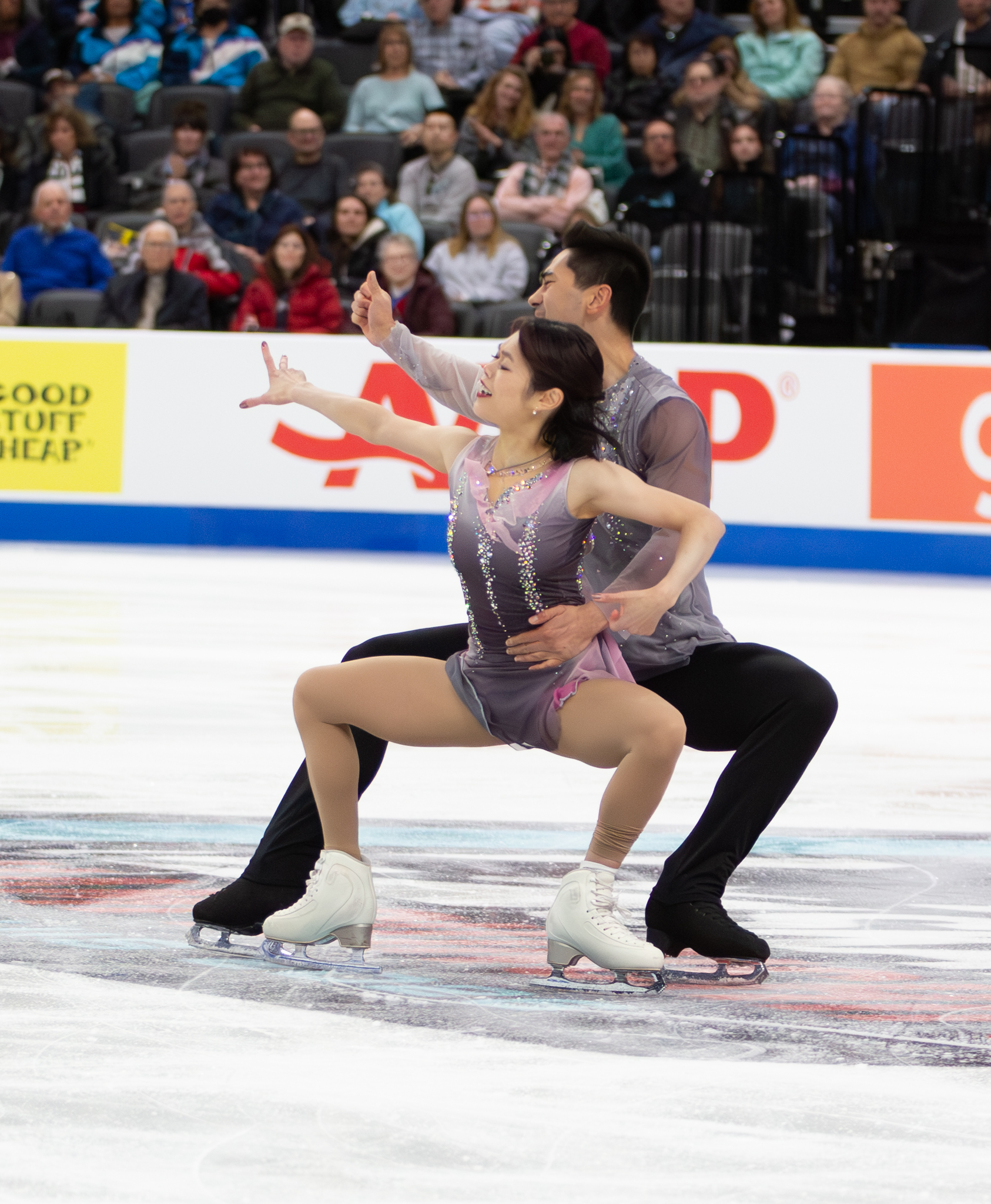
A pair team perform Besti squats
(Emily Chan & Spencer Akira Howe)

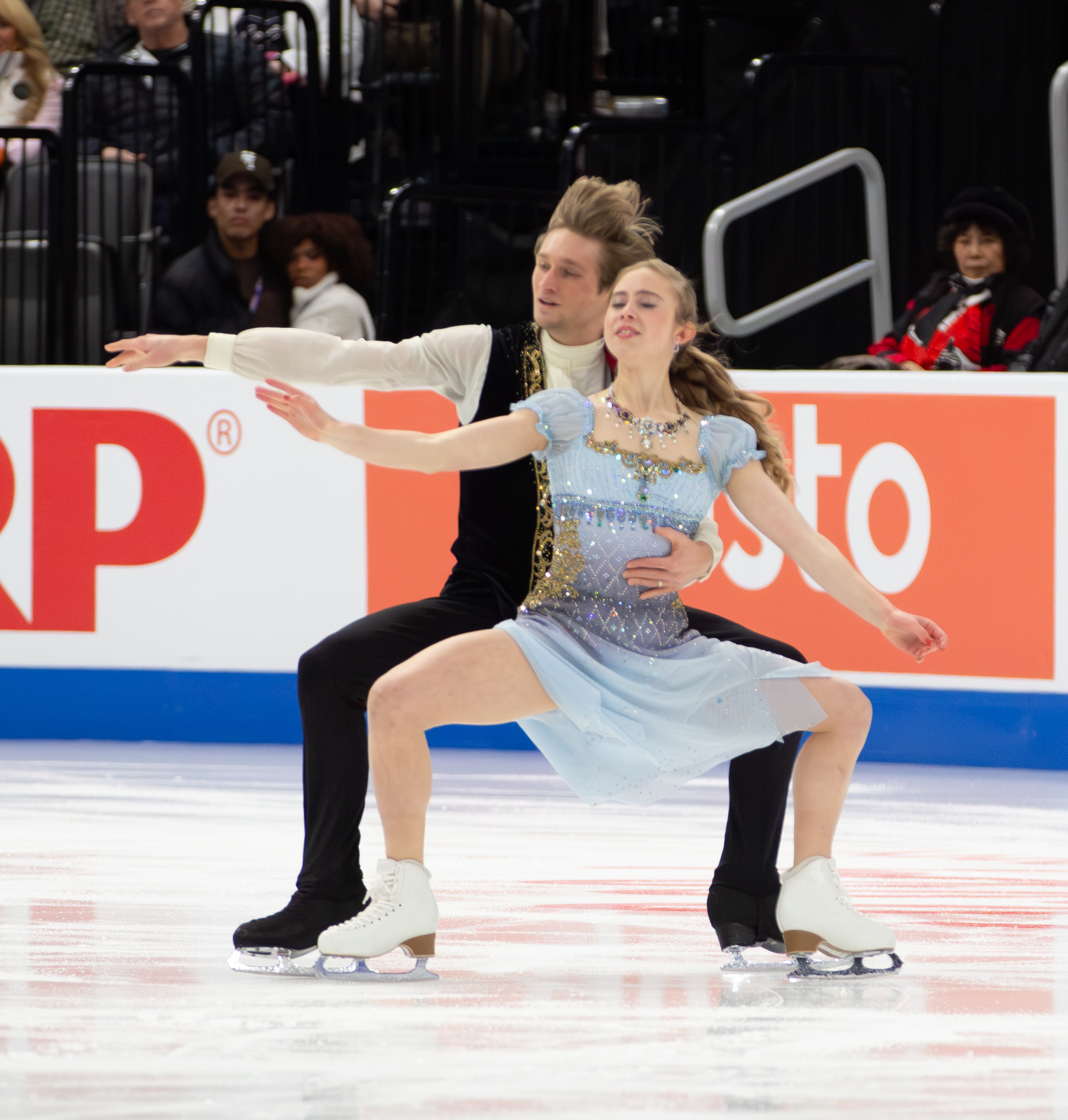
Besti squats as used during an ice dance routine
(Leah Neset & Artem Markelov)

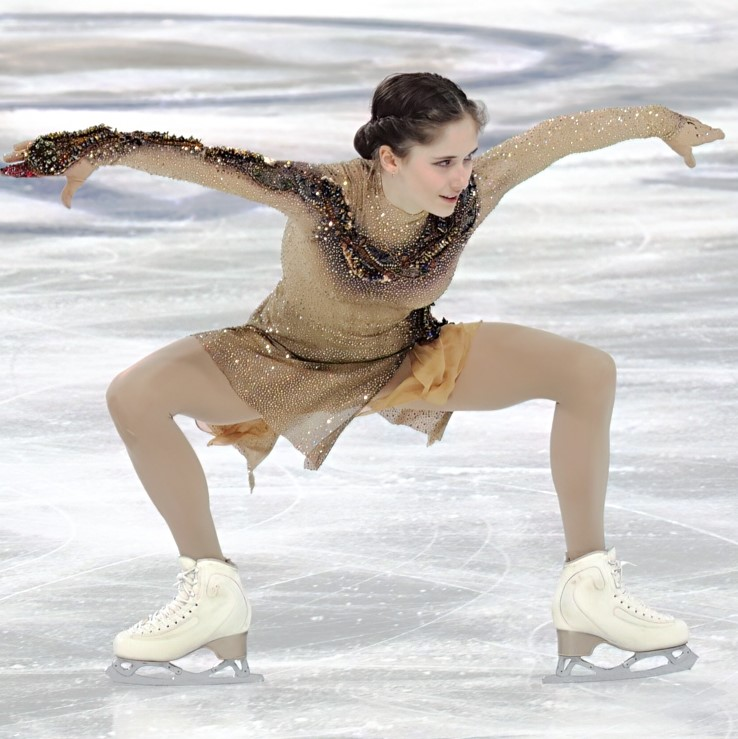
Front view of a solo Besti squat
(Isabeau Levito)
