= Kao Miura =

Japanese figure skater (born 2005)

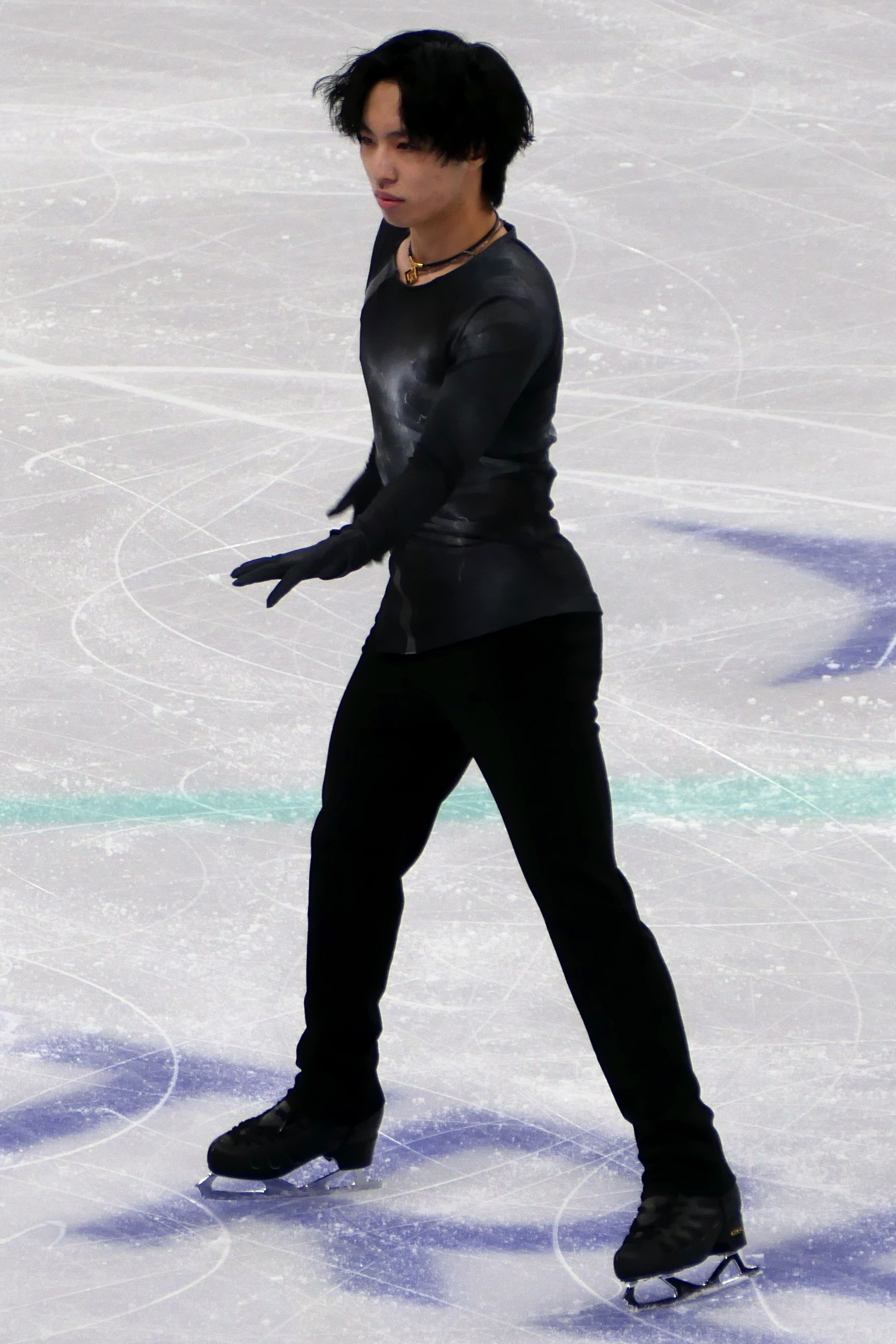
- Miura at the 2024 World Championships

Personal information
- Native name: 三浦 佳生
- Born: June 8, 2005 (age 21) Tokyo, Japan
- Home town: Yokohama
- Height: 1.68 m (5 ft 6 in)

Figure skating career
- Country: Japan
- Discipline: Men's singles
- Coach: Noriko Sato; Nobuko Fukui; Koji Okajima
- Skating club: OrientalBio; Meiji University
- Began skating: 2009

Medal record
Four Continents Championships
Gold medal – first place	2023 Colorado Springs	Singles
Gold medal – first place	2026 Beijing	Singles
Bronze medal – third place	2022 Tallinn	Singles
Japan Championships
Bronze medal – third place	2025–26 Tokyo	Singles
World Junior Championships
Gold medal – first place	2023 Calgary	Singles

Kao Miura (三浦 佳生, Miura Kao; born June 8, 2005) is a Japanese figure skater. He is the 2023 and 2026 Four Continents champion, the 2022 Four Continents bronze medalist, an eight-time ISU Grand Prix medalist, and the 2025–26 Japanese national bronze medalist.

At the junior level, he is the 2023 World Junior Champion and the 2021–22 Japan junior national champion.

== Personal life ==
Miura was born on 8 June 2005, in Tokyo, Japan. His mother, a doctor, raised him and his younger sister on her own after Miura's father passed away from cancer when he was seven years old.

His hobbies include watching anime and baseball matches.

After graduating from Meguro Nihon University High School, Miura enrolled into Meiji University School of Political Science and Economics in 2024. He has also expressed interest in learning English to better communicate with skaters from outside of Japan.

== Career ==
=== Early years ===
Miura began skating in 2009. As the 2017 Japanese national novice champion, he was invited to skate in the gala at the 2017 NHK Trophy.

=== 2019–20 season: Junior international debut ===
Miura made his Junior Grand Prix debut at Latvia and finished in seventh place. At 14, he became the youngest Japanese skater to land a quadruple toe loop in international competition with a successful attempt at the event's free skate.

=== 2020–21 season: Senior debut ===
Miura won the silver medal in 2020–21 Japan Junior Championships. Four days after the junior national championships, he made his Grand Prix debut at 2020 NHK Trophy and placed sixth. He was seventh at the senior national championships.

=== 2021–22 season: Four Continents bronze ===
Miura was assigned to the Grand Prix at the 2021 NHK Trophy, where he finished eighth. He called the competition "a lot of fun" and without pressure.

At the 2021–22 Japan Championships in December, Miura finished in fourth place in the senior event after winning gold in the junior event the previous month. He was named as an alternate for the Japanese Olympic team and sent to make his ISU championship debut at the 2022 Four Continents Championships and the 2022 World Junior Championships. Miura won the bronze medal at Four Continents, his first ISU championship medal, saying "I think I was able to show the world what kind of a skater I am. Of course, there were some mistakes I made, but even with the mistakes, I was able to put on a good performance and round it off as I did today, so I'm very happy."

On March 1, Miura was assigned to replace Yuzuru Hanyu at the 2022 World Championships. He was subsequently himself forced to withdraw due to a left quadriceps injury, and was replaced by Kazuki Tomono. At the time of his withdrawal, Miura indicated that he hoped to recover in time to compete at the World Junior Championships scheduled for a few weeks later in mid-April. Multiple jump errors in the short program lead to his placing twentieth in that segment with a score of 60.03. He rose to thirteenth overall after the free skate.

=== 2022–23 season: World Junior champion and Four Continents champion ===
Miura was invited to participate as part of Team Japan in the Japan Open following Yuma Kagiyama's withdrawal due to injury, finishing third in the men's competition while the team won gold.

Competing in the Grand Prix for his third season, and outside Japan for the first time, Miura's first assignment was the 2022 Skate America in Norwood. He unexpectedly placed first in the short program, aided by an error by pre-event favourite Ilia Malinin, and took the silver medal overall. He said that he "was in top form coming in, so I was able to do very well here." He placed first in the short program again at the 2022 Skate Canada International the following weekend, this time overtaking reigning world champion Shoma Uno and placed second in the free skate, earning his second consecutive Grand Prix silver medal. The two combined silver medals qualified Miura for the 2022–23 Grand Prix Final.

At the Final in Turin, Miura placed third in the short program despite falling on his jump combination, part of a Japanese sweep of the top three placements in that segment. He explained his error as having "panicked because my first jump was so good, and that's something I need to reflect on." He struggled in the free skate, tripling or doubling two planned quad jumps and falling on a third. He finished sixth in that segment and dropped to fifth overall. Very disappointed with the results and blaming a lack of focus, he said he hoped to "connect this frustration with the nationals and win and give it all."

Miura had a poor showing in the short program at the 2022–23 Japan Championships, falling on both of his attempted quad jumps. He placed thirteenth in that segment, well back of the leaders. He rallied in the free skate, placing second in that segment, sufficient to rise to sixth overall. As a result, he was named to compete at both the 2023 Four Continents Championships and the 2023 World Junior Championships.

At the 2023 Four Continents Championships Miura went into the event as one of the favorites for the podium along with Cha Jun-hwan of Korea, Keegan Messing of Canada, and compatriot Shun Sato. Miura had a shaky landing on his opening quad Salchow, but rallied to win the short program. After strong free skates by Sato and Messing, Miura needed to skate clean, and he did, landing all of his elements cleanly to achieve a new season's best score in the free program and overall to win the title.

Miura entered the World Junior Championships in Calgary as the favourite for the gold medal, and won the short program with a clean skate, placing five points clear of second-place Canadian skater Wesley Chiu. Referencing his poor short program at the previous year's event, he opined that he was able to "funnel that frustration into a good performance today." He went on to win the free skate by almost forty points, earning the gold medal, his second ISU championship of the year. "I give myself about a 70-percent score for my performance, especially in the second half of the program," he said regarding the free skate.

=== 2023–24 season: World Championship debut ===
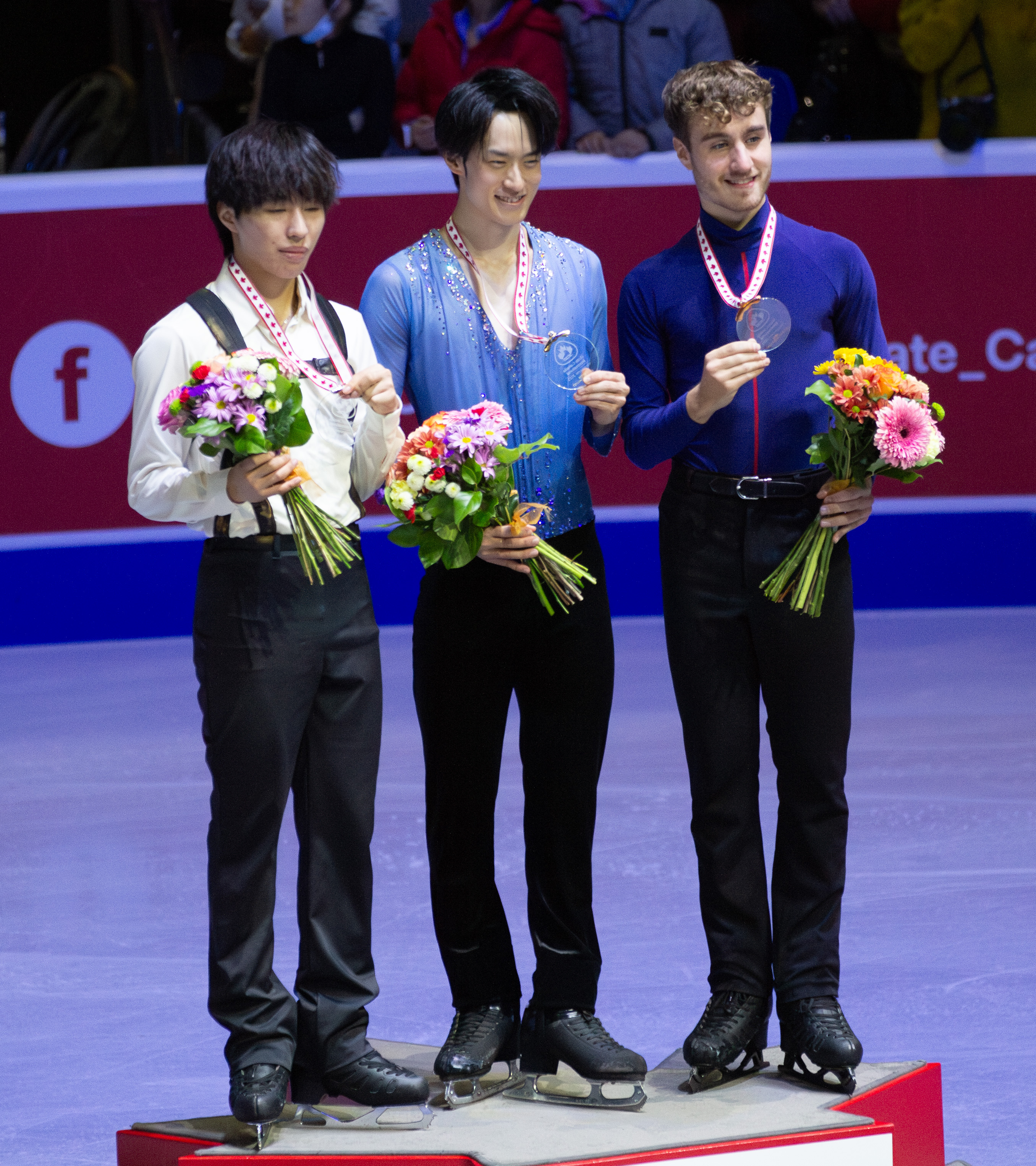
Miura (left) during the medal ceremony at 2024 Skate Canada International

Following what he considered disappointments in the previous season, Miura vowed to change his mindset, with the goal of winning the national title and reaching the World Championship podium. He worked with choreographer Shae-Lynn Bourne on a free skate to music from Attack on Titan, saying that he would be "acting as if I were fighting as a member of the Survey Corps." Beginning the season at the 2023 CS Finlandia Trophy, Miura won the gold medal.

On the Grand Prix, Miura came fourth in the short program after doubling a planned quad toe loop. He went on to win the free skate, despite a triple Axel fall, rising to second place. He finished less than a point back of gold medalist Sōta Yamamoto. He went on to win his second event, the 2023 Grand Prix of Espoo, coming first in the short program and second in the free skate and beating another Japanese skater, Shun Sato, by 1.22 points. Struggling with a stomach ailment that curtailed his practice time, Miura finished fifth at the Grand Prix Final for the second consecutive season.

Miura dealt with stomach trouble in the leadup to the short program at the 2023–24 Japan Championships, but managed to place fourth in the segment, cleanly landing all his jumps before two spin errors cost him points. He was fourth as well in the free skate, finishing fourth overall, 6.92 points back of bronze medalist Yamamoto.

Miura finished the season at the 2024 World Championships in Montreal, where he came tenth in the short program after failing to execute his jump combination. He rose to eighth overall in the free skate, despite falling twice on quadruple jumps. Miura was pessimistic afterward, saying: "I feel bad for taking one of the three spots we had at the World Championships due to my poor performance."

=== 2024–25 season: Struggles with injury ===
Miura started the season by finishing fourth at the 2024 CS Lombardia Trophy. While at the event, he suffered an injury to his left foot in the same area where he had torn a muscle two years prior. Although Miura stated that the injury was not at risk of becoming serious and that he was given permission from his doctor to continue competing.

Going into 2024 Skate America, Miura expressed that the injury was still bothering him but that he would do his best. Despite this, he managed to deliver two strong programs, including a personal best short program, and won the bronze medal.

Going on to compete at the 2024 NHK Trophy, Miura placed second in the short program where he scored overall 100 points for the first time in an ISU competition. However, the following day, he would have a disastrous free skate, where he failed to successfully deliver any of his attempted jump elements. He would place eleventh in the free skate and dropped to sixth-place overall. Despite suffering with pain in his left thigh at the event, Miura made no excuses and was despondent during the interview following the free program. He expressed, "I don't know why [this happened]... I just don't have the skill. I'll just keep practicing so that I never experience this again." Following the gala exhibition, where Miura performed his Beauty and the Beast free program from the 2022–23 figure skating season, Miura was awarded with the "Best Performance Award."

Prior to the 2024–25 Japan Championships, Miura sustained an injury to his left thigh and had to take painkillers prior to competing. He placed fourth in the short program but only ninth in the free skate, finishing eighth overall. He was subsequently named to the Four Continents team and selected as the first alternate to the 2025 World Championship team.

Although assigned to the 2025 Universiade, Miura withdrew due to his nagging thigh injury. In late February, Miura competed at the 2025 Four Continents Championships in Seoul, South Korea, where he finished sixth overall.

=== 2025–26 season: Milano Cortina Olympics, Four Continents champion, and Japanese national bronze medal ===
Miura opened his season at 2025 CS Kinoshita Group Cup where he placed eighth. The following week, he finished sixth at 2025 CS Lombardia Trophy.

In late October, he competed at 2025 Grand Prix de France. He was third after the short program, but took two falls in the free skate, and subsequently finished in tenth place. Following the disastrous event, he shared, "It’s not even just disappointment – it’s a feeling of sadness. It feels like I’m stuck in a long, dark tunnel, but I hope I’ll eventually see the light, and I’ll keep running forward no matter what." Prior to Skate Canada, Miura elected to scrap his Last Samurai free program and instead go back to his Umbrellas of Cherbourg program from the previous season, stating that after the Grand Prix de France he could no longer to listen to his intended program music.

The skater rebounded at his next event, the 2025 Skate Canada International, edging out teammate Kazuki Tomono for the bronze medal and scoring a new season's best in both the free skate and combined total score. "I’m happy to be sort of released from my nightmarish Grand Prix of France,” he said. “And it’s been almost a year since I was able to do a good free program."

In late December, Miura competed at the 2025–26 Japan Championships, where he won his first senior national medal, a bronze behind Yuma Kagiyama and Shun Sato. He was subsequently named to the 2026 Winter Olympic team.

The following month, Miura won the 2026 Four Continents Championships by a narrow margin of 0.11 points over South Korea's Junhwan Cha. "I was thinking about how I started this season," Miura reflected. "At my first free skate this season, I got 104 points. Looking back on that, I feel like I've fought through, I've trained and I've persevered. There were some frustrating moments, but I gave it my all and I've fought it until now."

On 8 February, while in Italy preparing for the Olympics, the outer part of Miura's right skating boot broke while landing a jump. Because of this unexpected incident, he inserted stiff material into the outer side of the boot before securing it with several types of tape. Two days later, Miura had a disastrous short program of the Men's singles event, where he doubled a planned quad Salchow and fell on a quad toe attempt. As a result, he placed twenty-second in the short program, managing to advance to the competition's free skate segment. On 13 February, Miura skated a significantly stronger free skate, placing tenth in that segment and moving up to thirteenth place overall. "It was an extremely rare experience," he said following performance, reflecting on his Olympic experience. "I really felt that it was a stage that comes with tremendous pressure. I learned how to conduct myself in that situation and in the free program, I think I was able to give a good performance in my own way. I learned from that. Rather than letting it end as just a memory, I want to return at the next Olympics as an athlete capable of winning a medal."

In March, Miura completed his season at the 2026 World Championships in Prague, Czech Republic. Due to several errors in the short program, he placed twenty-fifth and did not advance to the free skate segment.

=== 2026–27 season ===
Miura opened his season with a 7th place finish at the 2026 Kinoshita Group Cup.

In October, Miura competed on the Grand Prix series at the 2026 Grand Prix de France. After placing ninth in the short program, Miura rose to second overall and won the silver medal following the free skate. "I was very disappointed yesterday (the short program), but today I told myself that I could compete with the very best skaters. I think I proved that."

Two weeks later, Miura competed in the 2026 Cup of China placing first in both the short program and the free skate. He won the competition with a personal best score of 293.25 and effectively qualified for the Grand Prix Final. “I think this season has gotten off to a good start,” he said. “I’m in good condition right now, and I’m really happy about that!”

== Programs ==
Season	Short program	Free skate	Exhibition	Ref.
2019–20	"Rise" By Safri Duo Choreo. by Luca Lanotte	"The Bells of Notre Dame" (from The Hunchback of Notre Dame) By Alan Menken Choreo. by Misao Sato	—N/a	
2020–21	"Feeling Good" By Leslie Bricusse Performed by Michael Bublé Choreo. by Noriko Sato	The Last Samurai; "A Way of Life"; "Spectres in the Fog"; "A Hard Teacher"; "Red Warrior"; "The Way of the Sword" By Hans Zimmer Choreo. by Eiji Iwamoto	"Piano Man" By Billy Joel	
2021–22	The Four Seasons: Winter By Antonio Vivaldi Choreo. by Noriko Sato	Preludio; Nada Pude Dormir; Marinera de Lavante; Amor Dulce Muerte; Poeta en El Viento By Vicente Amigo Choreo. by Eiji Iwamoto	"Give Me Love" By Ed Sheeran Choreo. by Noriko Sato	
2021–22	The Four Seasons: Winter By Antonio Vivaldi Choreo. by Noriko Sato	Preludio; Nada Pude Dormir; Marinera de Lavante; Amor Dulce Muerte; Poeta en El Viento By Vicente Amigo Choreo. by Eiji Iwamoto	Rise	
2022–23	"Michelangelo '70"; "Muerte Del Angel" All by Astor Piazzolla Choreo. by Kenji Miyamoto	Beauty and the Beast; "Main Title (Prologue)" By Alan Menken, Howard Ashman & Tim Rice; "Evermore" Performed by Dan Stevens; "Transformations"; "Beauty and the Beast (Finale)" By Alan Menken, Howard Ashman & Tim Rice Choreo. by Eiji Iwamoto	"Suit" By Taro Hakase & →Pia-no-jaC← Choreo. by Kohei Yoshino	
2022–23	"Michelangelo '70"; "Muerte Del Angel" All by Astor Piazzolla Choreo. by Kenji Miyamoto	The Phantom of the Opera By Andrew Lloyd Webber Choreo. by Kohei Yoshino	"Suit" By Taro Hakase & →Pia-no-jaC← Choreo. by Kohei Yoshino	
2023–24	"This Place Was a Shelter" By Ólafur Arnalds Choreo. by Benoît Richaud	Attack on Titan; "Ətˈæk 0N tάɪtn"; "omake-pfadlib" By Hiroyuki Sawano; "Ashes on the Fire" By Kohta Yamamoto Choreo. by Shae-Lynn Bourne	"Natural" By Imagine Dragons Choreo. by Kenji Miyamoto	
2024–25	"Conquest of Spaces" By Woodkid Choreo. by Benoît Richaud	"The Umbrellas of Cherbourg" By Michel Legrand Performed by Peter Breiner & His Symphonic Pop Orchestra; "Les Parapluies de Cherbourg" Performed by Mario Pelchat Choreo. by Shae-Lynn Bourne	Beauty and the Beast	
2024–25	"Conquest of Spaces" By Woodkid Choreo. by Benoît Richaud	"The Umbrellas of Cherbourg" By Michel Legrand Performed by Peter Breiner & His Symphonic Pop Orchestra; "Les Parapluies de Cherbourg" Performed by Mario Pelchat Choreo. by Shae-Lynn Bourne	"Nemesis" By Benjamin Clementine Choreo. by Kenji Miyamoto	
2024–25	"Conquest of Spaces" By Woodkid Choreo. by Benoît Richaud	"The Umbrellas of Cherbourg" By Michel Legrand Performed by Peter Breiner & His Symphonic Pop Orchestra; "Les Parapluies de Cherbourg" Performed by Mario Pelchat Choreo. by Shae-Lynn Bourne	"Myra" By Tani Yuuki Choreo. by Kao Miura	
2025–26	"Sunset on M."; "Sturm I: Fear" By Dardust Choreo. by Benoît Richaud; "Conquest of Spaces - Woodkid"	The Phantom of the Opera; The Opening By Jean-Michel Jarre; "Prologue"; "Overture/Hannibal"; "The Music of the Night"; "The Point of No Return/Chandelier Crash" By Andrew Lloyd Webber Performed by Gerard Butler Choreo. by Benoît Richaud; To Know My Enemy (from The Last Samurai) By Hans Zimmer; Hiten (from Rurouni Kenshin By Naoki Satō; Curfew By Hiromitsu Agatsuma; Red Warrior (from The Last Samurai) By Hans Zimmer Choreo. by Kenji Miyamoto; "The Umbrellas of Cherbourg"	"INZM" By Number i Choreo. by Kao Miura	
2026–27	"Love Story" By Pérez Prado; "Gopher Mambo" By Leandro Da Silva Choreo. by Kana Muramoto	Jekyll & Hyde By Frank Wildhorn Choreo. by Shae-Lynn Bourne	INZM by number_i	

== Competitive highlights ==
- GP – Event of the ISU Grand Prix Series
- JGP – Event of the ISU Junior Grand Prix Series
- CS – Event of the ISU Challenger Series
- TBD – Assigned
- WD – Withdrew from competition
- Medals at team events are awarded for the team results only. Individual placements at team events are listed in parentheses.

Competition placements at senior level
Season	2020–21	2021–22	2022–23	2023–24	2024–25	2025–26	2026–27
Winter Olympics						13th	
World Championships				8th		25th	
Four Continents Championships		3rd	1st		6th	1st	
Grand Prix Final			5th	5th			TBD
Japan Championships	7th	4th	6th	4th	8th	3rd	
GP Cup of China							1st
GP France						10th	2nd
GP Finland				1st			
GP NHK Trophy	6th	8th			6th		
GP Skate America			2nd		3rd		
GP Skate Canada			2nd	2nd		3rd	
CS Finlandia Trophy				1st			
CS Kinoshita Group Cup						8th	7th
CS Lombardia Trophy					4th	6th	
Japan Open			1st (3rd)				
Tallink Hotels Cup				1st			

Competition placements at junior level
Season	2017–18	2018–19	2019–20	2020–21	2021–22	2022–23
World Junior Championships					13th	1st
Japan Championships	13th	8th	8th	2nd	1st	
JGP Latvia			7th			

== Detailed results ==
ISU personal best scores in the +5/-5 GOE System
Segment	Type	Score	Event
Total	**TSS**	**293.25**	2026 Cup of China
Short program	**TSS**	**102.96**	2024 NHK Trophy
Short program	TES	59.58	2026 Cup of China
Short program	PCS	44.63	2024 NHK Trophy
Free skating	**TSS**	**190.35**	2026 Cup of China
Free skating	TES	102.02	2023 Four Continents Championships
Free skating	PCS	88.71	2026 Cup of China

=== Senior level ===
- Small medals for the short program and free skating are only awarded at ISU Championships.
- Medals at team events are awarded for the team results only. Individual placements at team events are listed in parentheses.
- ISU Personal Bests highlighted in **bold**.

Results in the 2020–21 season
Date	Event	SP		FS		Total	
Date	Event	P	Score	P	Score	P	Score
Nov 27–29, 2020	(Japan) 2020 NHK Trophy	8	66.84	2	143.69	6	210.53
Dec 23–27, 2020	2020–21 Japan Championships	13	67.61	5	153.65	7	221.26

Results in the 2021–22 season
Date	Event	SP		FS		Total	
Date	Event	P	Score	P	Score	P	Score
Nov 12–14, 2021	(Japan) 2021 NHK Trophy	8	76.62	7	156.27	8	232.89
Dec 22–26, 2021	2021–22 Japan Championships	5	92.81	4	183.35	4	276.16
Jan 18–23, 2022	(Estonia) 2022 Four Continents Championships	3	88.37	3	162.70	3	251.07

Results in the 2022–23 season
Date	Event	SP		FS		Total	
Date	Event	P	Score	P	Score	P	Score
Oct 8, 2022	2022 Japan Open	–	–	3	169.94	1	–
Oct 21–23, 2022	(United States) 2022 Skate America	1	94.96	2	178.23	2	273.19
Oct 28–30, 2022	2022 Skate Canada International	1	94.06	2	171.23	2	265.29
Dec 8–11, 2022	(Italy) 2022–23 Grand Prix Final	3	87.07	6	158.67	5	245.74
Dec 21–25, 2022	2022–23 Japan Championships	13	71.12	2	171.43	6	242.55
Feb 7–12, 2023	(United States) 2023 Four Continents Championships	1	91.90	1	189.63	1	281.53

Results in the 2023–24 season
Date	Event	SP		FS		Total	
Date	Event	P	Score	P	Score	P	Score
Oct 4–8, 2023	(Finland) 2023 CS Finlandia Trophy	1	90.95	1	176.86	1	267.81
Oct 27–29, 2023	2023 Skate Canada International	4	80.80	1	177.09	2	257.89
Nov 17–19, 2023	(Finland) 2023 Grand Prix of Espoo	1	93.54	2	181.02	1	274.56
Dec 7–10, 2023	(China) 2023–24 Grand Prix Final	4	94.86	5	166.67	5	261.53
Dec 20–24, 2023	2023–24 Japan Championships	4	93.91	4	186.17	4	280.08
Feb 15–18, 2024	(Estonia) 2024 Tallink Hotels Trophy	1	99.58	1	143.37	1	242.95
Mar 18–24, 2024	(Canada) 2024 World Championships	10	85.00	7	169.72	8	254.72

Results in the 2024–25 season
Date	Event	SP		FS		Total	
Date	Event	P	Score	P	Score	P	Score
Sep 12–15, 2024	(Italy) 2024 CS Lombardia Trophy	5	76.42	4	158.33	4	234.75
Oct 18–20, 2024	(United States) 2024 Skate America	2	99.54	3	179.13	3	278.67
Nov 8–10, 2024	(Japan) 2024 NHK Trophy	2	**102.96**	11	137.42	6	240.38
Dec 19–22, 2024	2024–25 Japan Championships	4	88.87	9	141.22	8	230.09
Feb 19–23, 2025	(South Korea) 2025 Four Continents Championships	5	78.80	7	151.68	6	230.48

Results in the 2025–26 season
Date	Event	SP		FS		Total	
Date	Event	P	Score	P	Score	P	Score
Sep 5–7, 2025	(Japan) 2025 CS Kinoshita Group Cup	6	82.49	10	136.68	8	219.17
Sep 11–14, 2025	(Italy) 2025 CS Lombardia Trophy	3	92.76	10	140.26	6	233.02
Oct 17–19, 2025	2025 Grand Prix de France	3	87.25	12	122.32	10	209.57
Oct 31 – Nov 2, 2025	2025 Skate Canada International	4	89.80	3	163.89	3	253.69
Dec 18–21, 2025	2025–26 Japan Championships	2	95.65	3	165.53	3	261.18
Jan 21-25, 2026	(China) 2026 Four Continents Championships	1	98.59	4	175.14	1	273.73
Feb 10–13, 2026	(Italy) 2026 Winter Olympics	22	76.77	10	170.11	13	246.88
Mar 24–29, 2026	(Czech Republic) 2026 World Championships	25	71.05	—N/a	—N/a	25	71.05

Results in the 2026-27 season
Date	Event	SP		FS		Total	
Date	Event	P	Score	P	Score	P	Score
Sep 4–6, 2026	(Japan) 2026 CS Kinoshita Group Cup	11	68.44	6	146.67	7	233.81
Oct 23-25, 2026	2026 Grand Prix de France	9	72.67	2	175.29	2	247.96
Nov 6-8, 2026	2026 Cup of China	1	102.90	1	**190.35**	1	**293.25**

=== Junior level ===
Results in the 2017–18 season
Date	Event	SP		FS		Total	
Date	Event	P	Score	P	Score	P	Score
Dec 21–23, 2017	2017–18 Japan Championships (Junior)	10	59.98	14	102.42	13	162.40

Results in the 2018–19 season
Date	Event	SP		FS		Total	
Date	Event	P	Score	P	Score	P	Score
Dec 20–24, 2018	2018–19 Japan Championships (Junior)	8	62.20	4	128.68	8	190.88

Results in the 2019–20 season
Date	Event	SP		FS		Total	
Date	Event	P	Score	P	Score	P	Score
Sep 4–7, 2019	2019 JGP Latvia	10	59.94	5	125.56	7	185.50
Nov 15–17, 2019	2019–20 Japan Championships (Junior)	15	57.86	4	122.54	8	180.40

Results in the 2020–21 season
Date	Event	SP		FS		Total	
Date	Event	P	Score	P	Score	P	Score
Nov 21–23, 2020	2020–21 Japan Championships (Junior)	5	71.56	1	136.15	2	207.71

Results in the 2021–22 season
Date	Event	SP		FS		Total	
Date	Event	P	Score	P	Score	P	Score
Nov 19–21, 2021	2021–22 Japan Championships (Junior)	7	64.00	1	165.28	1	229.28
Apr 13–17, 2022	(Estonia) 2022 World Junior Championships	20	60.03	8	137.56	13	197.59

Results in the 2022–23 season
Date	Event	SP		FS		Total	
Date	Event	P	Score	P	Score	P	Score
Feb 27 – Mar 5, 2023	(Canada) 2023 World Junior Championships	1	85.11	1	179.63	1	264.74
