= Mone Chiba =

Japanese figure skater (born 2005)

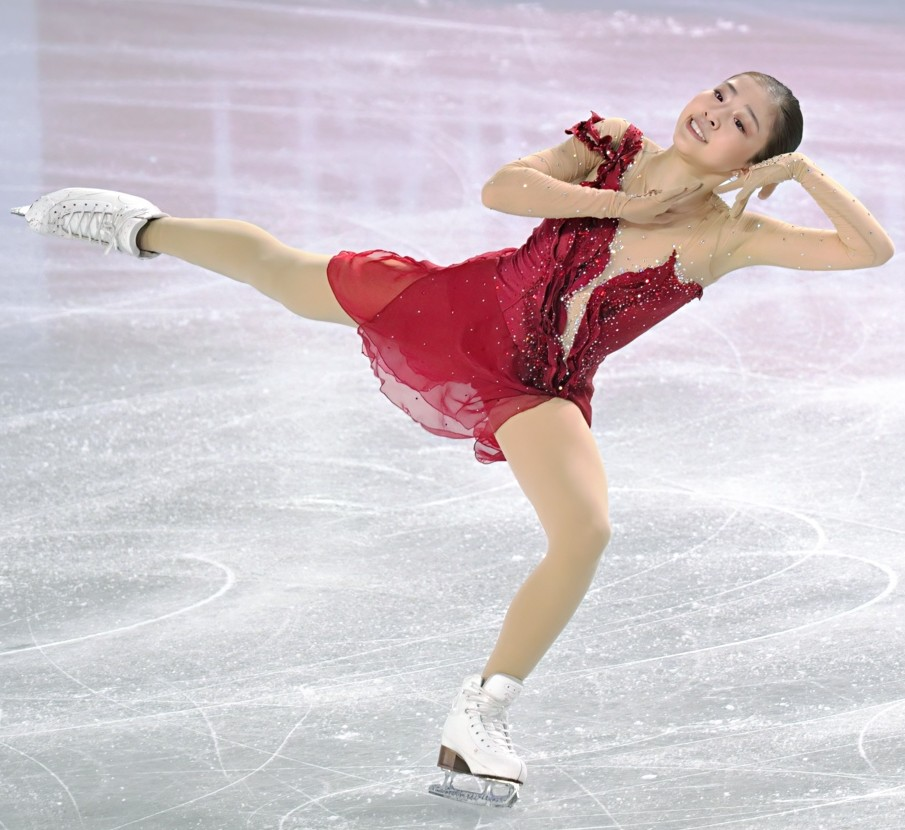
- Mone Chiba during her free skate at the 2024–25 Grand Prix Final

Personal information
- Native name: 千葉 百音
- Born: May 1, 2005 (age 21) Sendai, Japan
- Home town: Kyoto, Japan
- Height: 1.56 m (5 ft 1 in)

Figure skating career
- Country: Japan
- Discipline: Women's singles
- Coach: Mie Hamada; Satsuki Muramoto; Hiroaki Sato
- Skating club: Kinoshita Academy
- Began skating: 2009
- Highest WS: 1st (2026–27)

Medal record
World Championships
Silver medal – second place	2026 Prague	Singles
Bronze medal – third place	2025 Boston	Singles
Four Continents Championships
Gold medal – first place	2024 Shanghai	Singles
Bronze medal – third place	2023 Colorado Springs	Singles
Bronze medal – third place	2026 Beijing	Singles
Grand Prix Final
Silver medal – second place	2024–25 Grenoble	Singles
Japan Championships
Silver medal – second place	2023–24 Nagano	Singles
Bronze medal – third place	2025–26 Tokyo	Singles
World Team Trophy
Silver medal – second place	2025 Tokyo	Team

Mone Chiba (千葉 百音, Chiba Mone; born May 1, 2005) is a Japanese figure skater. She is the 2025 World bronze medalist, the 2026 World silver medalist, the 2024 Four Continents champion, the 2023 and 2026 Four Continents bronze medalist, the 2024–25 Grand Prix Final silver medalist, a five-time Grand Prix medalist, a two-time Challenger Series medalist, the 2025 World University Games silver medalist, and the 2023 Japanese national silver medalist. She represented Japan at the 2026 Winter Olympics, placing fourth.

Competing at the junior level, she is the 2022 JGP Poland I silver medalist, a two-time Japanese Junior medalist, and a two-time Challenge Cup junior champion.

== Early life and education ==
Chiba was born on May 1, 2005, in Sendai, Miyagi Prefecture, Japan. She graduated from Tohoku High School and enrolled in Waseda University, studying Human Sciences, in March 2024.

Chiba grew up idolizing Olympic gold medalist and Sendai hometown hero Yuzuru Hanyu; they met on the ice several times and he was "like a big brother" for her before he moved to Toronto, Canada to further his training.

== Career ==
=== Early years ===
Chiba began skating in 2010 and was coached by Soshi Tanaka at the Sendai Ice Rink from the ages of six to eighteen.

She would place twenty-first at 2015–16 Japan Novice B Championships and twenty-ninth at 2016–17 Japan Novice A Championships. She made her first international appearance at the 2017 Asian Open in the advanced novice category and was first after the short program. In the free program, she downgraded a jump and had a fall. She finished in fifth place. Chiba placed sixth at 2017–18 Japan Novice A Championships.

Making her junior national championship debut at the 2018–19 Japan Junior Championships, Chiba finished in eighteenth place. The following year, she placed sixth at the 2019–20 Japan Junior Championships and was then invited to compete in the senior event because fourth place Momoka Hatasaki was still a novice skater. She finished in eighteenth place. In the junior category, she won the 2020 Challenge Cup.

=== 2020–21 season ===
She finished eighth place at the 2020–21 Japan Junior Championships and was invited to the 2020–21 Japan Championships, placing in twentieth there.

=== 2021–22 season ===
In light of the COVID-19 pandemic, the Japan Skating Federation opted not to send junior skaters out internationally in the fall of 2021. As a result, Chiba did not have the opportunity to compete on the Junior Grand Prix. At 2021–22 Japan Junior Championships, Chiba was seventh after the short. However, after a clean free program, she won the bronze medal behind Rion Sumiyoshi and Mao Shimada. She finished eleventh at the senior event.

Chiba was selected to 2022 Challenge Cup in the junior category and again won the competition. Two months later, she was sent to 2022 Egna Trophy, now competing in the senior category. Chiba got third place behind South Korea's Hae-in Lee and Japan's Hana Yoshida.

=== 2022–23 season: Four Continents bronze ===
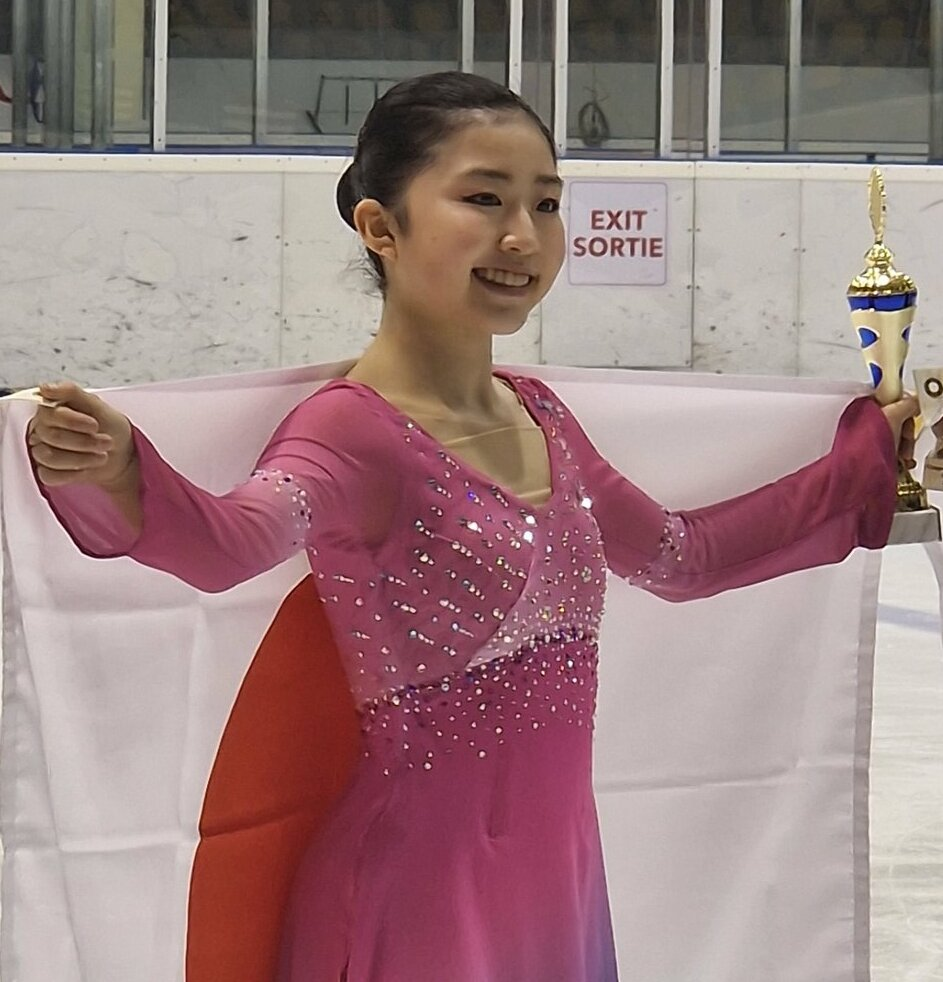
Chiba at the 2023 Coupe du Printemps

Chiba was initially scheduled to make her Junior Grand Prix debut at the Armenian stop on the 2022–23 circuit. However, that was cancelled as a result of the September conflict between Azerbaijan and Armenia, and skaters meant to attend were reassigned elsewhere. Instead, she debuted at the Junior Grand Prix event in Gdańsk, Poland. In her short program, she received an edge call on her combination but otherwise gave a clean skate, placing her first with a score of 70.16 points. During the free skate, Chiba landed all her jumps, albeit with a Lutz landed on a quarter. Chiba finished in second place behind Mao Shimada. At her second assignment, the 2022 JGP Italy, Chiba finished third in the short program, but dropped to fourth place after making several errors. She was named the first of three alternates for 2022–23 Junior Grand Prix Final.

Appearing next at the 2022–23 Japan Junior Championships, Chiba won the silver medal behind Shimada. She then competed at the senior level, finishing a surprise third in the short program with a 71.06 score. She said that she "went into the short program with the frustration of last year," when she had finished eleventh in that segment. Chiba struggled in the free skate, coming seventh in that segment and dropping to fifth place overall. Despite being the third-highest-ranked senior-eligible qualifier, she was not assigned to compete at the 2023 World Championships, that going instead to Rinka Watanabe. She was assigned to compete at the 2023 Four Continents Championships.

At the Four Continents Championships in Colorado Springs, Chiba was seventh in the short program. However, a new personal best score in the free skate vaulted her into third overall, winning the bronze medal. Saying she had "never dreamed of getting a bronze medal," she assessed that "my skating maybe was not as grand as I would have liked it, but I am still satisfied."

Chiba ended her season with a gold medal at the 2023 Coupe du Printemps.

In May 2023, it was announced that Chiba had relocated from Sendai to Uji, Kyoto, where she would be coached by Mie Hamada at the Kinoshita Academy.

=== 2023–24 season: Four Continents champion ===
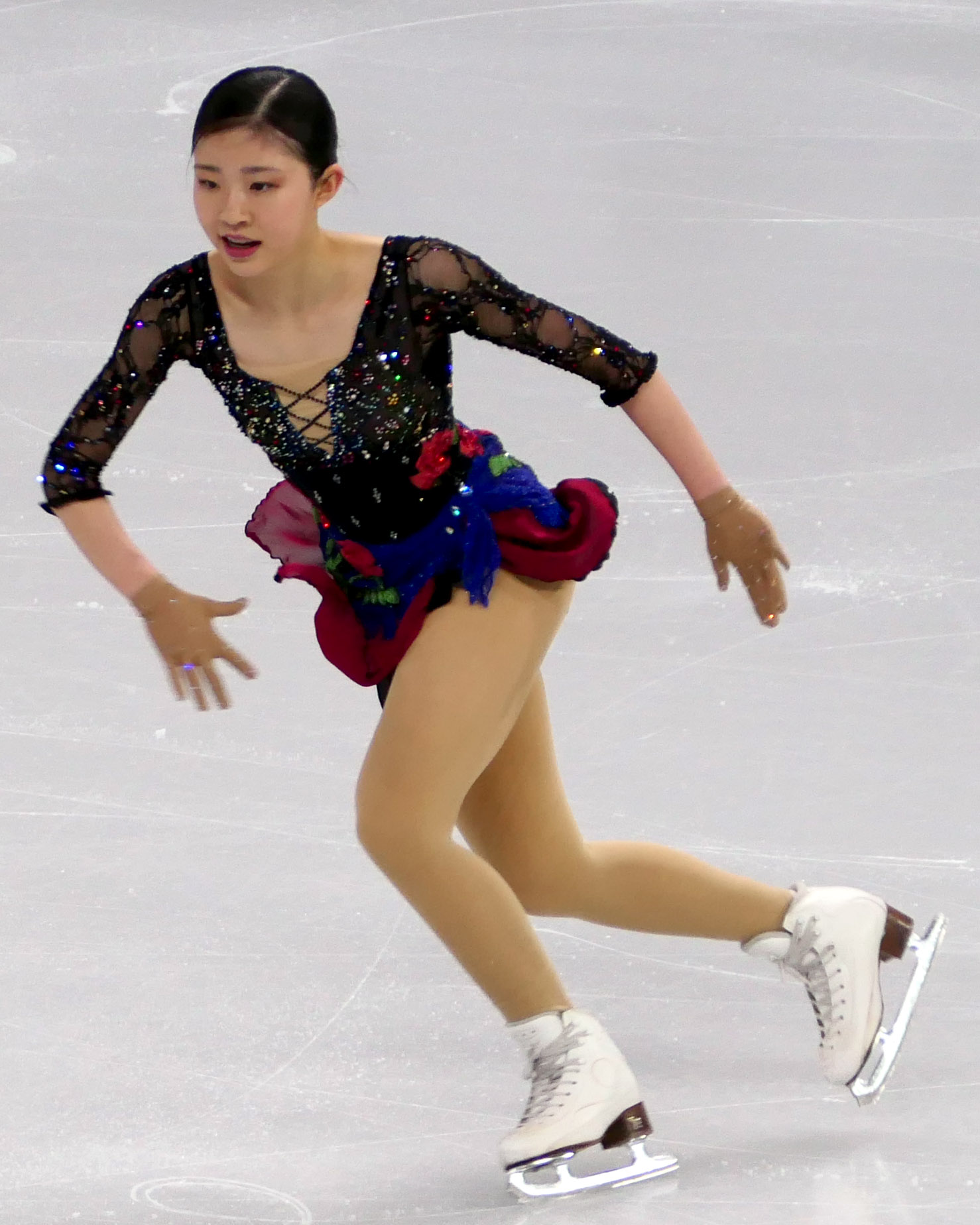
Chiba performing her short program at the 2024 World Championships

Chiba began the season on the Challenger circuit, coming sixth at the 2023 CS Autumn Classic International. She made her senior Grand Prix debut at the 2023 Skate America, where she finished in sixth place. At her second assignment, the 2023 Grand Prix de France, she came ninth. Chiba said afterward that she had struggled with dizziness prior to the free skate, but "after the second half of my performance, I think I was able to jump well."

At the 2023–24 Japan Championships, Chiba finished third in the short program, less than two points back of second-place Mako Yamashita but also less than a point ahead of two other skaters. She admitted after the segment that she had felt "a little unwell" since the French Grand Prix, but said that she had been able to recover adequately, while self-critiquing that "with my current skating skills, I'm only able to express half of the emotions. However, I did everything I was capable of." In the free skate, she rose to second place to claim the silver medal. Of the result, Chiba said she "trained very hard and everything paid off."

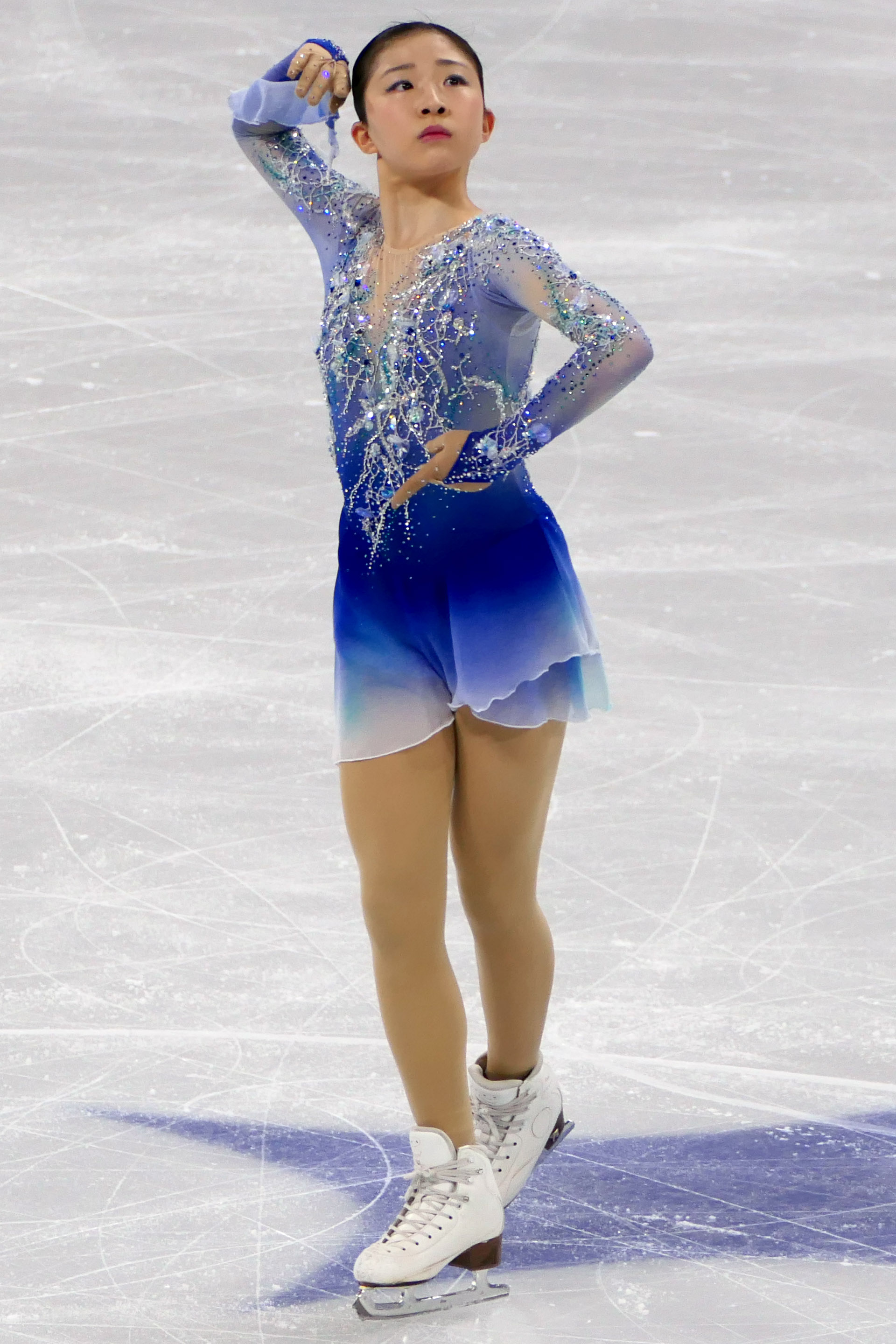
Chiba during her free skate at the 2024 World Championships

Chiba won the short program at the 2024 Four Continents Championships, the only error being an incorrect edge call on her triple Lutz. Her 71.10 point score was a new personal best. She said that nervousness had impacted her artistic performance, joking that "my eyebrows looked like a figure eight from start to finish." She went on to win the free skate as well, receiving another Lutz edge call and a quarter underrotation call on a triple flip, setting additional new personal bests in the free skate (143.88) and total score (214.98) and winning the gold medal. Chiba assessed that she "tried to focus myself solely on the competition, that is how I could get this ideal result."

Entering the 2024 World Championships in Montreal with medal hopes, Chiba encountered difficulty in the short program after singling a planned triple Lutz, coming thirteenth in the segment. She spoke afterward of struggling with nerves at her first World Championship appearance. Chiba performed better in the free skate, coming fifth in the segment and rising to seventh overall. “From now on, I would like to continue to improve my musical expressiveness," she said. “I was able to participate in a big competition in my first year as a senior, so I want to aim for more consistent performances in my second senior year.”

=== 2024–25 season: World bronze, Grand Prix Final silver ===
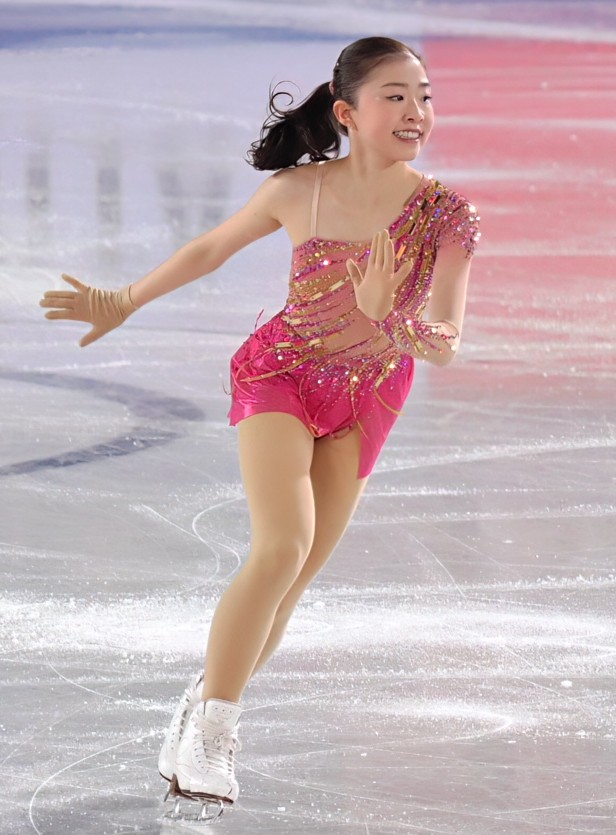
Chiba performing her short program at the 2024–25 Grand Prix Final

Chiba started the season by finishing fourth at the 2024 CS Nebelhorn Trophy. She began the Grand Prix series at the 2024 NHK Trophy, where she gained a new personal best score in the short program of 71.69. Scoring 140.85 in the free skate and 212.54 overall, Chiba won her first Grand Prix medal, a silver, as part of a Japanese team sweep, alongside Kaori Sakamoto, and Yuna Aoki. "At this NHK Trophy, I was able to get the silver medal for the first time," she said. "I'm so happy about it." At her second Grand Prix event, the Cup of China, Chiba led in the short program by .02 points over Amber Glenn. In the free skate, she landed her jumps cleanly, but she tripped and fell in her step sequence. She finished both the free skate and the competition overall in second place and qualified for the Grand Prix Final. At the Grand Prix Final in December, she finished in second place in both the short and free programs and came in second place overall to win the silver medal. While she said that she was happy with the result, she also expressed frustration and said that she wished she had taken second place with a stronger performance. "I'm glad that I got a silver medal, but I don't think I gave my all," she said after the free skate." Two weeks later, Chiba finished fourth at the 2024–25 Japan Championships. Due to her success on the Grand Prix circuit as well as national silver medalist, Mao Shimada, being age ineligible to compete on the senior level, Chiba was named to the Four Continents and World teams.

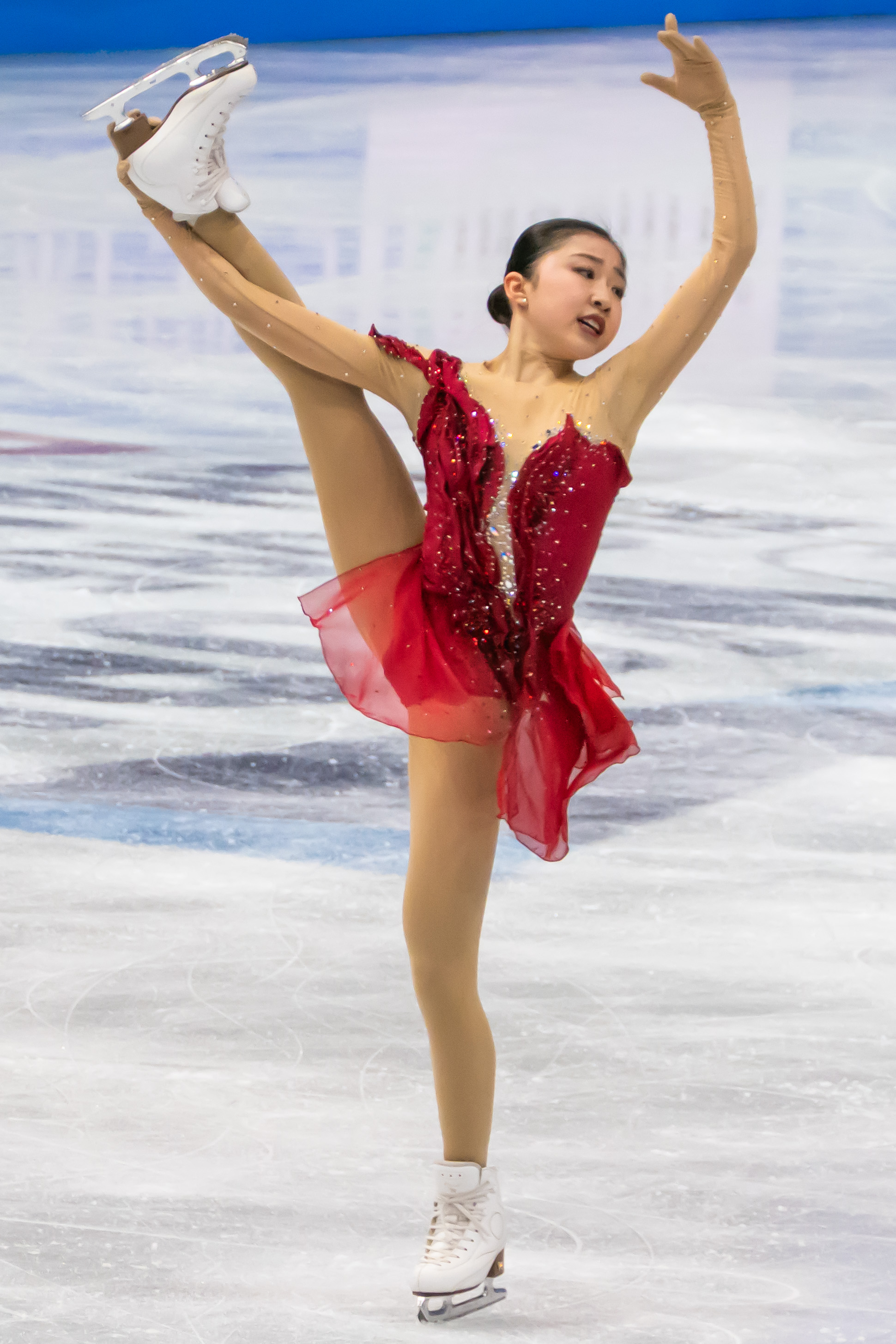
Chiba performing a Y-spin during her free skate at the 2025 World Championships

In mid-January, Chiba competed at the 2025 Winter World University Games in Turin, Italy, where she won the silver medal behind teammate, Rion Sumiyoshi. One month later, she competed at the 2025 Four Continents Championships in Seoul, South Korea. After placing second in the short program, Chiba began showing symptoms of gastroenteritis. "Despite not feeling well, I gave all my energy into my program," said Chiba. "And I think the things I experienced today were really valuable for me." She did compete in the free skate segment, where she struggled throughout the performance, including falling twice. She placed seventh in that segment and fell to sixth place overall. Following the event, she said, "It’s really frustrating that due to health issues, I couldn’t perform at my true level. It made me realize just how crucial it is to maintain the right conditions and health to be able to express all the hard work I’ve put into training. Going forward, I want to manage my health thoroughly."

In March, at the 2025 World Championships in Boston, Massachusetts, United States, Chiba finished second in the short program and third in the free skate to win the bronze medal behind three time champion, Kaori Sakamoto, and surprise winner, Alysa Liu. The skater from Kyoto said she did not imagine she would be on the podium, and was happy with the bronze, her first world medal.

A couple weeks later, Chiba competed for Team Japan at the 2025 World Team Trophy. She placed fourth in the women's short program and fifth in the free skate. With these placements, Team Japan went on to win the silver medal overall. "We were able to accomplish second place, and our team fought for it together," she said. "I'm happy to have experienced the team event before the Olympics."

"Looking back, I'd call this season a success—especially with my results at the Grand Prix Final and Worlds," Chiba reflected in a recent interview. "It was a year of growth and valuable new experiences."

=== 2025–26 season: Milano Cortina Olympics, World silver, Four Continents bronze, and Grand Prix gold ===
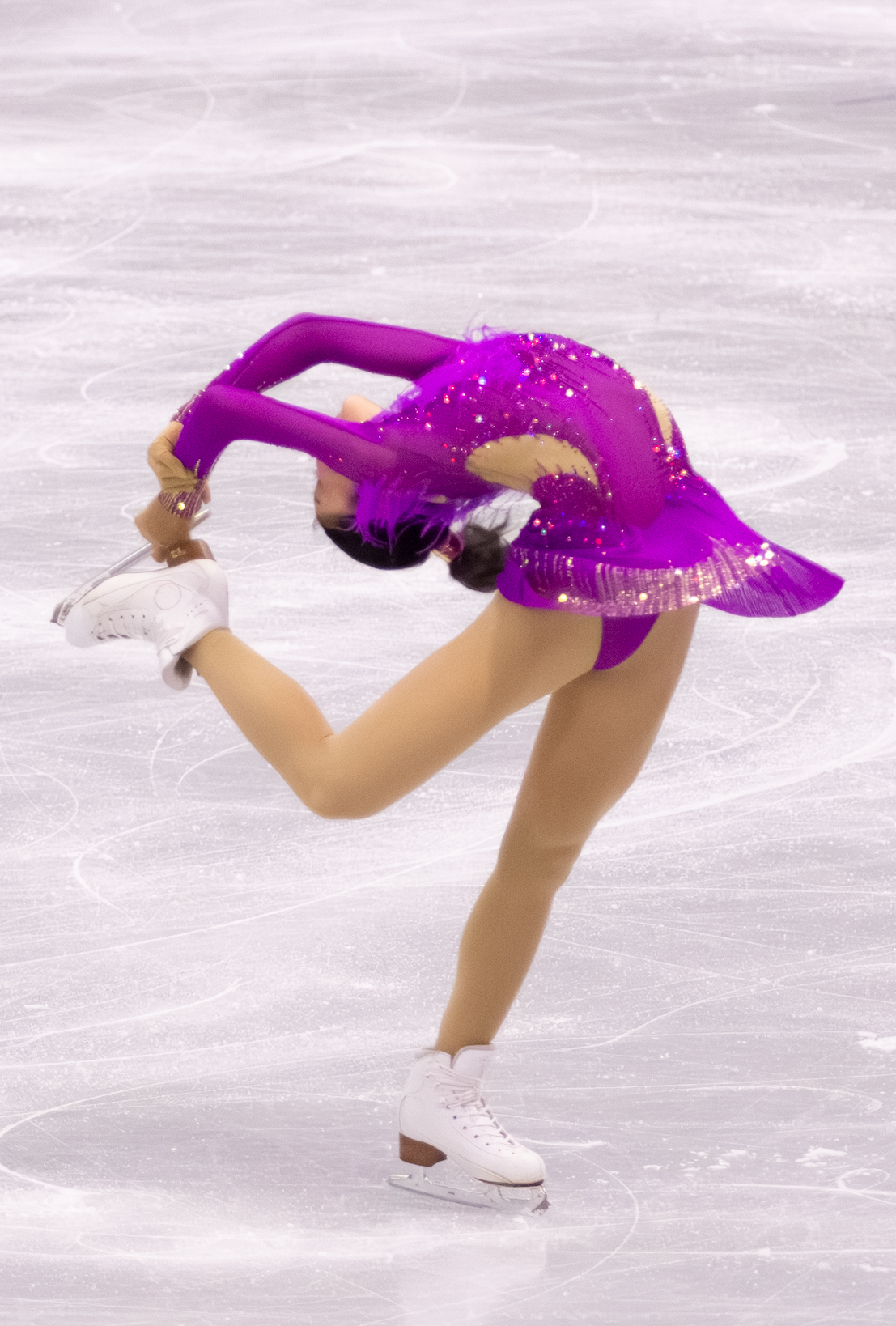
Chiba performing a catch-foot layback spin during her short program at 2025 Skate Canada International

Chiba opened her season by competing at two Challenger Series events: the 2025 CS Kinoshita Group Cup and the 2025 CS Nebelhorn Trophy, where she respectively earned the gold and silver medals. The following month, she won her first Grand Prix gold medal at the 2025 Skate Canada International. "I'm very happy to have won my first ever Grand Prix title," she said. "Looking ahead to my next event in Finland, I will learn from this event."

Three weeks later, Chiba won her second consecutive Grand Prix gold at 2025 Finlandia Trophy ahead of Amber Glenn, qualifying for the 2025-26 Grand Prix Final. “There is room for improvement, and I’ve identified those things,” she said of the competition in two weeks. “So, at the Final and at Nationals, I want to kind of restart the process and work on my performance again.”

The following month, Chiba placed fifth at the 2025–26 Grand Prix Final. She was first after the short program, but took two falls in the free skate. “I'm currently trying to figure out where my senses shifted,” she said. “I fell twice under all that pressure, but I was able to return to my usual jumps. I think I have no choice but to go into the All Japan Championships with my back to the wall. I know I have no choice, but I haven't sorted it out mentally yet, so I'm going to spend the night thinking carefully about what I should have done today. I never want to show everyone a performance like this again.” Two weeks later, Chiba came back strong at the 2025–26 Japanese Championships, where she delivered two clean performances and won the bronze medal behind Kaori Sakamoto and Mao Shimada. She was subsequently named to the 2026 Winter Olympic team.

In January, Chiba earned the bronze medal at the 2026 Four Continents Championships after placing third in both the short program and free skate. "Throughout this competition, including the short program and the free program, I’ve been disappointed," said Chiba. "I only have two weeks until the Olympics. What I really need to do is to accept where I am and really think what needs to be done and progress day by day to aim high."

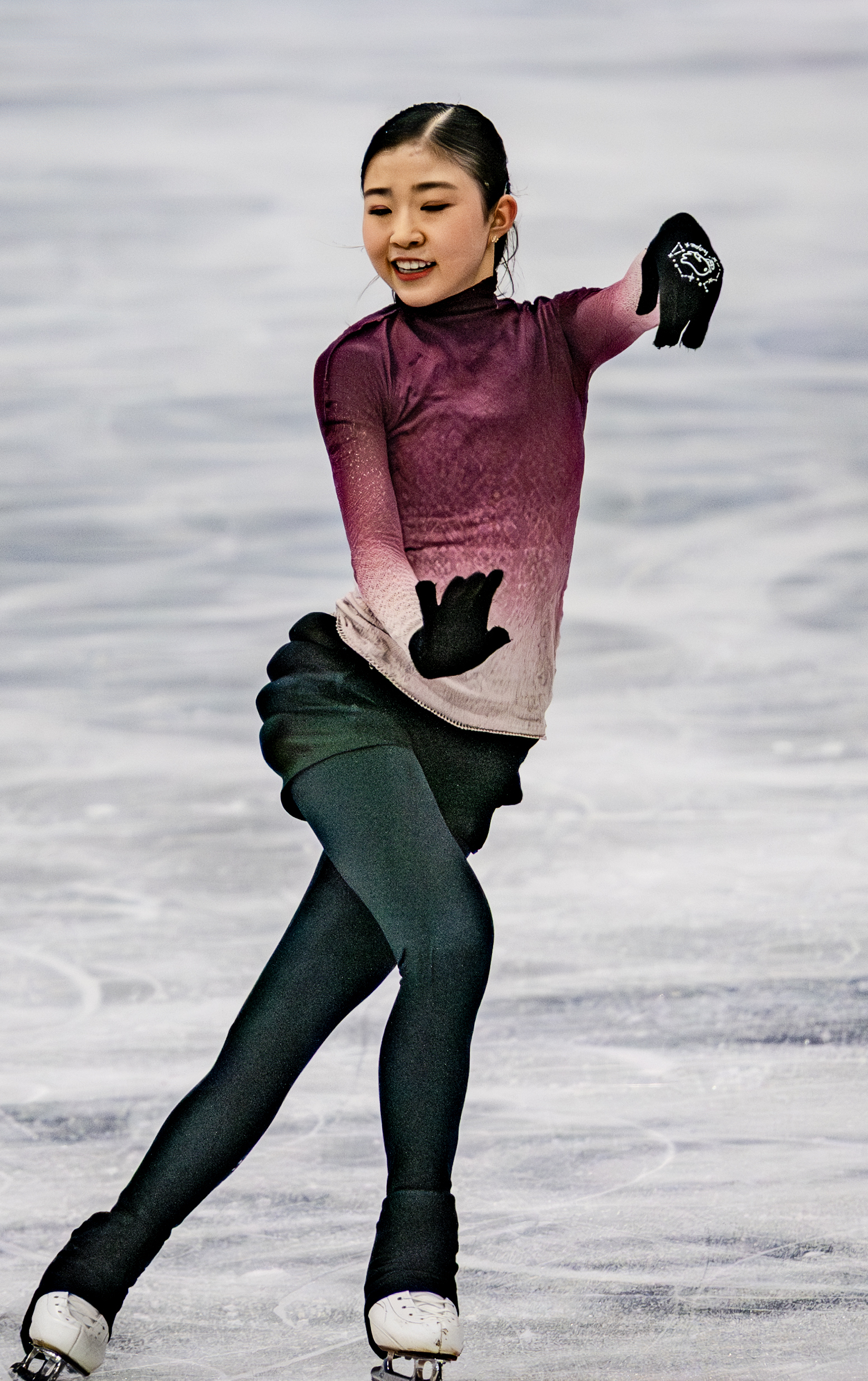
Chiba during a practice session at the 2026 Winter Olympics

On 17 February, Chiba competed in the short program at the 2026 Winter Olympics. She placed fourth in that segment after the second part of her triple flip-triple toe combination received a quarter underrotation call. "Being the final skater in my first Olympics felt very intense," she said following her performance. "But when I thought about how I might never experience being the last skater at the Olympics again in my life, I figured I might as well enjoy it. I was able to enjoy the last dance together with the large audience after I landed my Lutz today, and that made me very happy."

Two days later, Chiba competed in the free skate segment of the competition. She landed all of her attempted jumps but received quarter underrotation calls on the second part of her triple flip-triple toe combination, and on the first and third parts of her triple lutz-double toe-double loop jump sequence. Chiba ultimately placed fourth in that competition segment and finished fourth overall, only 1.28 points behind the bronze medal position. "1.28… Even though I gave absolutely everything I had, it still wasn’t enough. I don’t really know how to put it into words, but it’s a very complicated kind of frustration, something I felt for the first time," Chiba expressed in an interview following the event. "To put it very simply, I'm frustrated that I finished fourth, if I was only looking at it from my own perspective. But the performances of the three skaters who made the podium were truly wonderful, and I sincerely praise them from the bottom of my heart. It's hard to put into words. There were things I'm frustrated about, and there were things that were good and not so good. The only thing I can do now is give everything at the World Championships."

During the 2026 World Championships in Prague, Czech Republic, Chiba won the silver medal behind teammate Kaori Sakamoto after placing second in both the short program and free skate. She set personal best scores in her third outing at this event. "Coming into this event, I had many goals," said Chiba. "One of them, secretly, was to score over 220 points, and I achieved that. So I’m so happy about that aspect. This was the last event of the season, and coming here, I had so many experiences. I’m very grateful to have had all of them."

=== 2026–27 season ===
Chiba initially planned to open her season at the CS Kinoshita Group Cup but withdrew due to an injury on her right ankle.

Instead, Chiba opened her international competitive season at the 2026 Cup of China in Shenzhen, where she took gold. She placed first in the short program with a minor mistake on her double Axel. The following day, she skated a clean free program, placing second in that segment and leading to a first place finish overall. During the victory ceremony, some members of the crowd booed her and shouted derogatory comments. Commenting on her execution, Chiba said, "I'm really satisfied with my performance. I was actually very nervous, and at times I even forgot how I had practiced before. I think that’s something we need to reflect on and learn from so I can improve at the next competition."

After the event, Kim Jae-youl, the president of the International Skating Union (ISU), called the Japan Skating Federation to apologize for the booing of Chiba at the victory ceremony. A few days later, Japanese federation submitted a formal request that the ISU take measures to prevent similar issues in the future, and the week after, it stated that Chiba was being provided with mental health support. The ISU issued a public statement addressing poor behavior towards skaters both online and at events.

== Programs ==
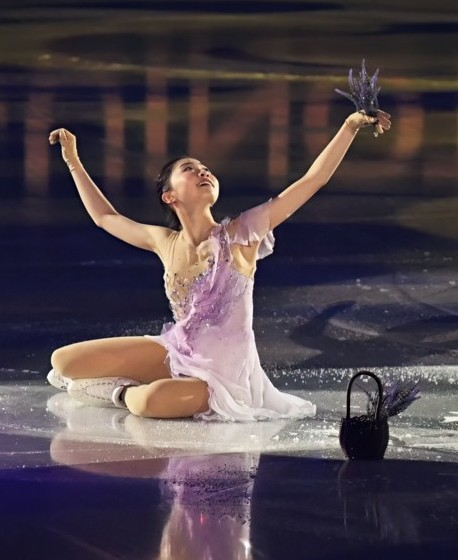
Chiba performing her exhibition program at the 2024–25 Grand Prix Final

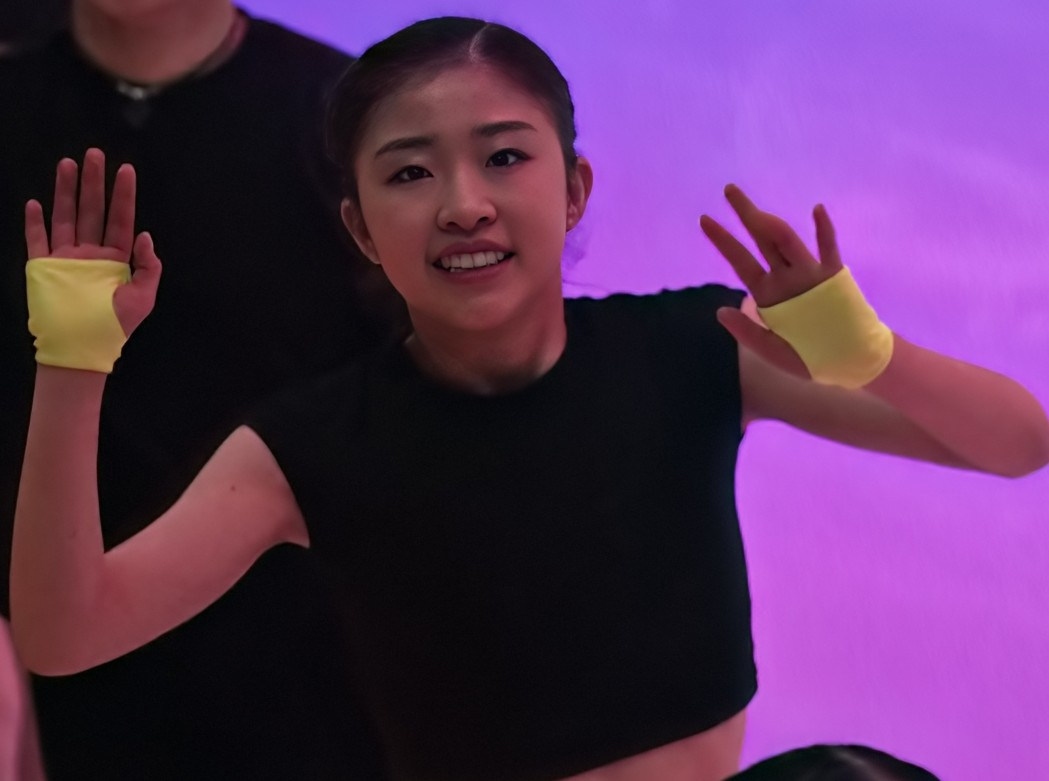
Chiba during the gala at the 2024–25 Grand Prix Final

Season	Short program	Free skating	Exhibition
2026–2027	James Bond; Skyfall (from Skyfall) by Adele; The Name's Bond... James Bond (from Casino Royale) by David Arnold & Nicholas Dodd choreo. by Jeffrey Buttle	Clair de lune by Claude Debussy performed by Simone Renzi choreo. by Kaitlyn Weaver	ONE (from A Chorus Line)
2025–2026	Last Dance by Donna Summer choreo. by Kaitlyn Weaver; Sakura (Version for Orchestra) performed by Jun Märkl & Residentie Orchestra choreo. by Guillaume Cizeron	Romeo and Juliet; A Thousand Times Good Night (from Romeo & Juliet) by Abel Korzeniowski; Kissing You (from Romeo + Juliet) by Craig Armstrong performed by Des'ree choreo. by Lori Nichol	Les Yeux Noirs (Dark Eyes) (Russian Folk Music) performed by Pomplamoose ft. The Vignes Rooftop Revival choreo. by Misha Ge; Madama Butterfly by Giacomo Puccini; Act III: Intermezzo – Oh eh! Oh eh! performed by Vienna Philharmonic & Herbert von Karajan; Act II: Un bel dì, vedremo performed by Mirella Freni, Vienna Philharmonic, & Herbert von Karajan choreo. by Kana Muramoto; Lavender No Saku Niwa De by Iwao Furusawa
2024–2025	Last Dance by Donna Summer choreo. by Kaitlyn Weaver	Ariana Concerto No. 1: II. Adagio Sostenuto by Yves Lévèque, Caroline Fauchet, & Colonne Orchestra choreo. by Lori Nichol	Lavender No Saku Niwa De by Iwao Furusawa
2023–2024	Les Yeux Noirs (Dark Eyes) (Russian Folk Music) performed by Pomplamoose ft. The Vignes Rooftop Revival choreo. by Misha Ge	The Legend of 1900; 1900's Theme; The Legend of the Pianist; Second Crisis; Playing Love by Ennio Morricone choreo. by Akiko Suzuki	Butterfly Lovers' Violin Concerto by He Zhanhao & Chen Gang performed by Ssu-Yu Huang choreo. by Kenji Miyamoto
2022–2023	Schindler's List by John Williams & Itzhak Perlman choreo. by Akiko Suzuki	Butterfly Lovers' Violin Concerto by He Zhanhao & Chen Gang performed by Ssu-Yu Huang choreo. by Kenji Miyamoto	Schindler's List by John Williams & Itzhak Perlman choreo. by Akiko Suzuki; Finale (from East of Eden) by Lee Holdridge choreo. by Akiko Suzuki
2021–2022	Finale (from East Of Eden) by Lee Holdridge choreo. by Akiko Suzuki	Butterfly Lovers' Violin Concerto by He Zhanhao & Chen Gang performed by Ssu-Yu Huang choreo. by Kenji Miyamoto	
2020–2021	Evergreen by Two Steps from Hell choreo. by Eiji Iwamoto	An American in Paris by George Gershwin choreo. by Eiji Iwamoto	
2019–2020	Giselle by Adolphe Adam choreo. by Eiji Iwamoto	An American in Paris by George Gershwin choreo. by Eiji Iwamoto	
2018–2019	Giselle by Adolphe Adam choreo. by Eiji Iwamoto	Csárdás by Vittorio Monti	
2017–2018	Lohengrin, act III: Prelude by Richard Wagner	Csárdás by Vittorio Monti	

== Competitive highlights ==
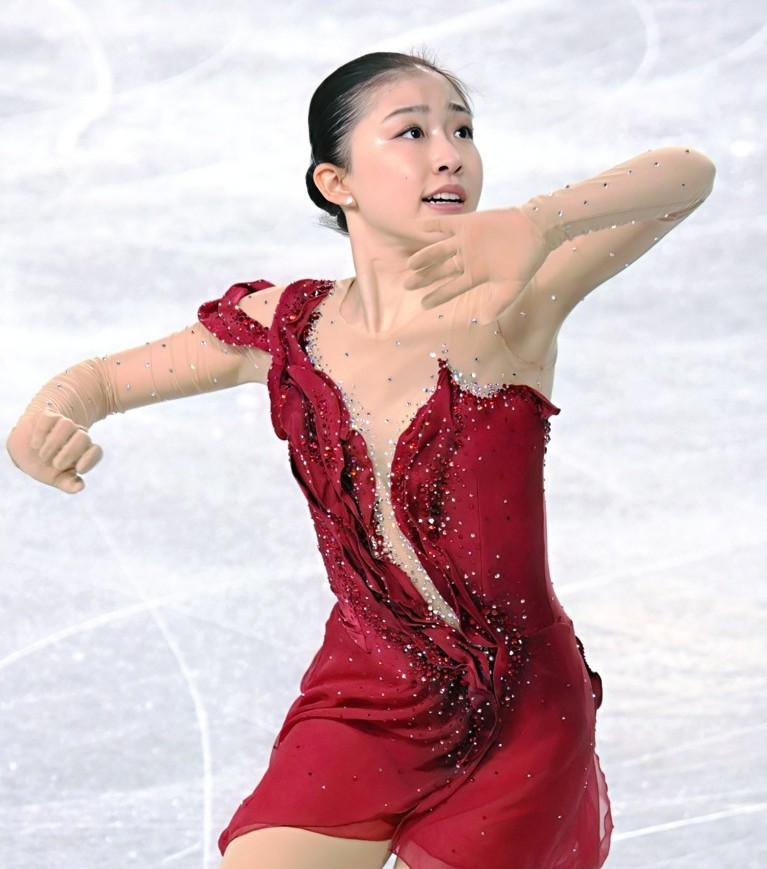
Mone Chiba during her free skate at the 2024–25 Grand Prix Final

- GP – Event of the ISU Grand Prix Series
- JGP – Event of the ISU Junior Grand Prix Series
- CS – Event of the ISU Challenger Series
- C – Event was cancelled
- TBD – Assigned
- WD – Withdrew from competition
- Medals at team events are awarded for the team results only. Individual placements at team events are listed in parentheses.

=== Senior level ===
Competition placements at senior level
Season	2019–20	2020–21	2021–22	2022–23	2023–24	2024–25	2025–26	2026–27
Winter Olympics							4th	
World Championships					7th	3rd	2nd	
Four Continents Championships				3rd	1st	6th	3rd	
Grand Prix Final						2nd	5th	
Japan Championships	18th	20th	11th	5th	2nd	4th	3rd	
World Team Trophy						2nd (5th)		
GP Cup of China						2nd		1st
GP Finland							1st	
GP France					9th			
GP NHK Trophy						2nd		TBD
GP Skate America					6th			
GP Skate Canada							1st	
CS Autumn Classic					6th			
CS Kinoshita Group Cup							1st	
CS Nebelhorn Trophy						4th	2nd	
Coupe du Printemps				1st				
Egna Spring Trophy			3rd					
Winter University Games						2nd		

=== Junior level ===
Competition placements at Junior level
Season	2018–19	2019–20	2020–21	2021–22	2022–23
JGP Armenia					C
JGP Italy					4th
JGP Poland					2nd
Challenge Cup		1st		1st	
Japan Junior	18th	6th	8th	3rd	2nd

== Detailed results ==
ISU personal best scores in the +5/-5 GOE System
Segment	Type	Score	Event
Total	TSS	228.47	2026 World Championships
Short program	TSS	78.45	2026 World Championships
Short program	TES	42.43	2026 World Championships
Short program	PCS	36.02	2026 World Championships
Free skating	TSS	150.02	2026 World Championships
Free skating	TES	77.83	2026 World Championships
Free skating	PCS	72.19	2026 World Championships

=== Senior level ===
Results in the 2019–20 season
Date	Event	SP		FS		Total	
Date	Event	P	Score	P	Score	P	Score
Dec 18–22, 2019	2019–20 Japan Championships	17	52.86	19	97.74	18	150.50

Results in the 2020–21 season
Date	Event	SP		FS		Total	
Date	Event	P	Score	P	Score	P	Score
Dec 24–27, 2020	2020–21 Japan Championships	24	54.45	18	103.77	20	158.22

Results in the 2021–22 season
Date	Event	SP		FS		Total	
Date	Event	P	Score	P	Score	P	Score
Dec 22–26, 2021	2021–22 Japan Championships	9	64.41	12	119.89	11	184.30
Apr 7–10, 2022	(Italy) 2022 Egna Spring Trophy	2	67.78	3	110.82	3	178.60

Results in the 2022–23 season
Date	Event	SP		FS		Total	
Date	Event	P	Score	P	Score	P	Score
Dec 21–25, 2022	2022–23 Japan Championships	3	71.06	7	129.06	5	200.12
Feb 7–12, 2023	(United States) 2023 Four Continents Championships	7	67.28	2	137.70	3	204.98
Mar 17–19, 2023	(Luxembourg) 2023 Coupe du Printemps	1	66.97	1	124.02	1	190.99

Results in the 2023–24 season
Date	Event	SP		FS		Total	
Date	Event	P	Score	P	Score	P	Score
Sep 14–16, 2023	(Canada) 2023 CS Autumn Classic International	6	57.66	6	102.59	6	160.25
Oct 20–22, 2023	(United States) 2023 Skate America	5	64.24	6	113.55	6	177.79
Nov 3–5, 2023	2023 Grand Prix de France	9	56.59	10	108.17	9	164.76
Dec 20–24, 2023	2023–24 Japan Championships	3	68.02	2	141.25	2	209.27
Jan 30 – Feb 4, 2024	(China) 2024 Four Continents Championships	1	71.10	1	143.88	1	214.98
Mar 18–24, 2024	(United States) 2024 World Championships	13	62.64	5	132.82	7	195.46

Results in the 2024–25 season
Date	Event	SP		FS		Total	
Date	Event	P	Score	P	Score	P	Score
Sep 19–21, 2024	(Germany) 2024 CS Nebelhorn Trophy	2	67.95	5	125.42	4	193.37
Nov 8–10, 2024	(Japan) 2024 NHK Trophy	2	71.69	2	140.85	2	212.54
Nov 22–24, 2024	2024 Cup of China	1	70.86	2	141.05	2	211.91
Dec 5–8, 2024	(France) 2024–25 Grand Prix Final	2	69.33	2	139.52	2	208.85
Dec 19–22, 2024	2024–25 Japan Championships	3	74.72	7	130.97	4	205.69
Jan 16–18, 2025	(Italy) 2025 Winter World University Games	1	72.00	2	131.85	2	203.85
Feb 19–23, 2025	(South Korea) 2025 Four Continents Championships	2	71.20	7	123.88	6	195.08
Mar 25–30, 2025	(United States) 2025 World Championships	2	73.44	3	141.80	3	215.24
Apr 17–20, 2025	(Japan) 2025 World Team Trophy	4	69.66	5	138.52	2 (5)	208.18

Results in the 2025–26 season
Date	Event	SP		FS		Total	
Date	Event	P	Score	P	Score	P	Score
Sep 5–7, 2025	(Japan) 2025 CS Kinoshita Group Cup	1	73.11	1	143.48	1	216.59
Sep 25–27, 2025	(Germany) 2025 CS Nebelhorn Trophy	4	69.24	1	144.40	2	213.64
Oct 31 – Nov 2, 2025	2025 Skate Canada International	1	72.29	1	144.94	1	217.23
Nov 21–23, 2025	(Finland) 2025 Finlandia Trophy	2	72.89	1	144.33	1	217.22
Dec 4–7, 2025	(Japan) 2025–26 Grand Prix Final	1	77.27	6	132.95	5	210.22
Dec 18–21, 2025	2025–26 Japan Championships	4	74.60	4	141.64	3	216.24
Jan 21–25, 2026	(China) 2026 Four Continents Championships	3	68.07	3	134.16	3	202.23
Feb 17–19, 2026	(Italy) 2026 Winter Olympics	4	74.00	4	143.88	4	217.88
Mar 24–29, 2026	(Czech Republic) 2026 World Championships	2	78.45	2	150.02	2	228.47

Results in the 2026–27 season
Date	Event	SP		FS		Total	
Date	Event	P	Score	P	Score	P	Score
Nov 6–8, 2026	2026 Cup of China	1	76.08	2	148.40	1	224.48

=== Junior level ===
Results in the 2018–19 season
Date	Event	SP		FS		Total	
Date	Event	P	Score	P	Score	P	Score
Nov 23 – 25, 2018	2018-19 Japan Championships (Junior)	8	53.50	19	83.41	18	136.91

Results in the 2019–20 season
Date	Event	SP		FS		Total	
Date	Event	P	Score	P	Score	P	Score
Nov 15 – 17, 2019	2019-20 Japan Championships (Junior)	7	56.51	6	105.08	6	161.59
Feb 20 – 23, 2020	(Netherlands) 2020 Challenge Cup	1	64.65	1	117.21	1	181.86

Results in the 2020–21 season
Date	Event	SP		FS		Total	
Date	Event	P	Score	P	Score	P	Score
Nov 21 – 23, 2020	2020-21 Japan Championships (Junior)	13	53.17	8	99.30	8	152.47

Results in the 2021–22 season
Date	Event	SP		FS		Total	
Date	Event	P	Score	P	Score	P	Score
Nov 19 – 21, 2021	2021-22 Japan Championships (Junior)	7	58.97	2	116.44	3	175.41
Feb 24 – 27, 2022	(Netherlands) 2022 Challenge Cup	1	66.42	1	108.87	1	175.29

Results in the 2022–23 season
Date	Event	SP		FS		Total	
Date	Event	P	Score	P	Score	P	Score
Sep 28 – Oct 1, 2022	2022 JGP Poland I	1	70.16	2	135.66	2	205.82
Oct 12 – 15, 2022	2022 JGP Italy	3	64.07	4	121.66	4	185.73
Nov 25 – 27, 2022	2022-23 Japan Championships (Junior)	2	65.72	2	127.43	2	193.15
