= 2020–21 Japan Figure Skating Championships =

Figure skating competition

- Type: National championship
- Date: December 23–27, 2020 (S); November 21–23, 2020 (J)
- Season: 2020–21
- Location: Nagano, Nagano (S); Hachinohe, Aomori (J)
- Host: Japan Skating Federation
- Venue: Big Hat (S); Flat Hachinohe (J)

Champions
- Men's singles: Yuzuru Hanyu (S); Lucas Tsuyoshi Honda (J)
- Ladies' singles: Rika Kihira (S); Rino Matsuike (J)
- Ice dance: Misato Komatsubara / Tim Koleto (S); Utana Yoshida / Shingo Nishiyama (J)
- Previous: 2019–20 Japan Championships
- Next: 2021–22 Japan Championships

The 2020–21 Japan Figure Skating Championships were held in Nagano, Nagano from December 23–27, 2020. It was the 89th edition of the event. Medals were awarded in the disciplines of men's singles, ladies' singles, and ice dance. The results were part of the Japanese selection criteria for the 2021 World Championships.

== Qualifying ==
Competitors either qualified at regional and sectional competitions, held from September to November 2020, or earned a bye. Skaters without a bye, but who train abroad, were awarded an exemption from the qualifiers to limit travel during the COVID-19 pandemic; the affected skaters were men's singles skater Koshiro Shimada, pair Riku Miura / Ryuichi Kihara, and ice dancers Rikako Fukase / Eichu Cho and Kana Muramoto / Daisuke Takahashi.

Date	Event	Type	Location	Results
September 25–27, 2020	Chu-Shikoku-Kyushu	Regional	Okayama, Okayama	Details
September 25–27, 2020	Chubu	Regional	Nagoya, Aichi	Details
October 1–4, 2020	Kanto	Regional	Hitachinaka, Ibaraki	Details
October 1–4, 2020	Kinki	Regional	Takaishi, Osaka	Details
October 8–11, 2020	Tohoku-Hokkaido	Regional	Niigata, Niigata	Details
October 8–11, 2020	Tokyo	Regional	Nishitōkyō, Tokyo	Details
October 24–25, 2020	Japan Novice Championships	Final	Maebashi, Gunma	Details
Oct. 30 – Nov. 1, 2020	Western Section	Sectional	Kyoto, Kyoto	Details
November 6–8, 2020	Eastern Section	Sectional	Kōfu, Yamanashi	Details
November 21–23, 2020	Japan Junior Championships	Final	Hachinohe, Aomori	Details
December 23–27, 2020	Japan Championships	Final	Nagano, Nagano	Details

== Medal summary ==
=== Senior ===
Discipline	Gold	Silver	Bronze
Men	Yuzuru Hanyu	Shoma Uno	Yuma Kagiyama
Ladies	Rika Kihira	Kaori Sakamoto	Satoko Miyahara
Pairs	Cancelled		
Ice dance	Misato Komatsubara / Tim Koleto	Kana Muramoto / Daisuke Takahashi	Rikako Fukase / Eichu Cho

=== Junior ===
Discipline	Gold	Silver	Bronze
Men	Lucas Tsuyoshi Honda	Kao Miura	Sena Miyake
Ladies	Rino Matsuike	Hana Yoshida	Mao Shimada
Pairs	No competitors		
Ice dance	Utana Yoshida / Shingo Nishiyama	Ayano Sasaki / Atsuhiko Tamura	Kaho Yamashita / Yuto Nagata

=== Novice ===
Discipline	Gold	Silver	Bronze
Men (Novice A)	Rio Nakata	Seigo Tauchi	Hikari Sato
Men (Novice B)	Ryoto Mori	Hayato Okazaki	Taiga Nishino
Ladies (Novice A)	Mao Shimada	Ayumi Shibayama	Ami Nakai
Ladies (Novice B)	Hanano Suzuki	Rena Uezono	Saho Ootake
Pairs	No competitors		
Ice dance	Nao Kida / Masaya Morita	Sumire Yoshida / Ibuki Ogahara	Kurea Yamamoto / Kotaro Fukuoka

== Entries ==
A list of preliminary entries was published on November 25, 2020. Names with an asterisk (*) denote junior skaters.

Men	Ladies	Ice dance
Tatuma Furuya	Yuna Aoki	Rikako Fukase / Eichu Cho
Yuzuru Hanyu	Mone Chiba*	Kiria Hirayama / Aru Tateno
Kazuki Hasegawa	Wakaba Higuchi	Misato Komatsubara / Tim Koleto
Ryuju Hino	Honoka Hirotani	Kana Muramoto / Daisuke Takahashi
Lucas Tsuyoshi Honda*	Marin Honda	Haruno Yajima / Yoshimitsu Ikeda
Taichi Honda	Rika Hongo	
Reo Ishizuka	Tomoe Kawabata	
Yuma Kagiyama	Mana Kawabe	
Tsunehito Karakawa	Rika Kihira	
Yuto Kishina*	Akari Matsubara	
Yuki Kunikata	Yura Matsuda	
Kazuki Kushida	Rino Matsuike*	
Kento Kobayashi	Mai Mihara	
Ryoma Kobayashi	Satoko Miyahara	
Kao Miura*	Yuka Nagai	
Sena Miyake*	Rin Nitaya	
Sumitada Moriguchi	Rika Oya	
Shunsuke Nakamura*	Kaori Sakamoto	
Kousuke Nakano	Ibuki Sato	
Kosho Oshima*	Yuna Shiraiwa	
Shun Sato	Rion Sumiyoshi*	
Koshiro Shimada	Natsu Suzuki*	
Takumi Sugiyama	Hina Takeno	
Mitsuki Sumoto	Riko Takino	
Keiji Tanaka	Chisato Uramatsu*	
Kazuki Tomono	Rinka Watanabe	
Shoma Uno	Mako Yamashita	
Koshin Yamada	Yuhana Yokoi	
Taichiro Yamakuma	Hana Yoshida*	
Sōta Yamamoto	Shiika Yoshioka	

=== Junior ===
The top six finishers at the Japan Junior Championships in men's and ladies' singles were added to the Japan Championships. Three of the top finishers in ladies, Mao Shimada (3), Ayumi Shibayama (4), and Ami Nakai (6), were novice skaters and not eligible for the senior Championships. The seventh- through ninth-place finishers, Natsu Suzuki (7), Mone Chiba (8), and Chisato Uramatsu (9), were bumped up in their place.

	Men	Ladies
1	Lucas Tsuyoshi Honda	Rino Matsuike
2	Kao Miura	Hana Yoshida
3	Sena Miyake	Rion Sumiyoshi
4	Yuto Kishina	Natsu Suzuki
5	Kosho Oshima	Mone Chiba
6	Shunsuke Nakamura	Chisato Uramatsu

== Results ==
=== Men ===
Rank	Name	Total points	SP		FS	
1	Yuzuru Hanyu	319.36	1	103.53	1	215.83
2	Shoma Uno	284.81	3	94.22	2	190.59
3	Yuma Kagiyama	278.79	2	98.60	3	180.19
4	Keiji Tanaka	238.83	4	83.61	4	155.22
5	Shun Sato	236.52	5	83.31	6	153.21
6	Kazuki Tomono	223.16	7	81.72	8	141.44
7	Kao Miura	221.26	13	67.61	5	153.65
8	Koshiro Shimada	220.94	9	71.88	7	149.06
9	Sōta Yamamoto	217.34	6	82.60	9	134.74
10	Sena Miyake	213.53	8	79.09	10	134.44
11	Ryuju Hino	202.13	11	69.79	11	132.34
12	Sumitada Moriguchi	196.10	17	66.18	12	129.92
13	Lucas Tsuyoshi Honda	194.03	14	67.52	13	126.51
14	Mitsuki Sumoto	193.37	15	67.15	14	126.22
15	Kousuke Nakano	187.06	16	66.47	15	120.59
16	Kazuki Kushida	184.81	10	71.23	18	113.58
17	Shunsuke Nakamura	184.01	18	63.97	16	120.04
18	Kosho Oshima	178.45	21	62.34	17	116.11
19	Taichi Honda	177.87	12	67.86	22	110.01
20	Kazuki Hasegawa	175.24	20	63.59	20	111.65
21	Yuto Kishina	174.30	22	61.38	19	112.92
22	Kento Kobayashi	172.41	23	60.88	21	111.53
23	Ryoma Kobayashi	168.94	19	63.91	23	105.03
24	Yuki Kunikata	159.29	24	60.08	24	99.21
Did not advance to free skating
25	Takumi Sugiyama	59.22	25	59.22	—N/a	
26	Taichiro Yamakuma	57.51	26	57.51	—N/a	
27	Koshin Yamada	56.56	27	56.56	—N/a	
28	Tsunehito Karakawa	54.51	28	54.51	—N/a	
29	Reo Ishizuka	50.29	29	50.29	—N/a	
30	Tatuma Furuya	47.09	30	47.09	—N/a	

=== Ladies ===
Marin Honda withdrew from the competition after collapsing from dizziness prior to a morning practice session at the event.

Rank	Name	Total points	SP		FS	
1	Rika Kihira	234.24	1	79.34	1	154.90
2	Kaori Sakamoto	222.17	2	71.86	2	150.31
3	Satoko Miyahara	209.75	6	66.48	3	143.27
4	Rino Matsuike	204.74	7	65.57	4	139.17
5	Mai Mihara	203.65	3	69.55	7	134.10
6	Mana Kawabe	201.58	8	64.70	5	136.88
7	Wakaba Higuchi	195.04	13	61.53	8	133.51
8	Yuhana Yokoi	194.22	16	59.83	6	134.39
9	Yuna Shiraiwa	190.39	10	63.96	9	126.43
10	Rin Nitaya	189.48	5	67.16	11	122.32
11	Tomoe Kawabata	186.18	9	64.56	12	121.62
12	Rion Sumiyoshi	186.08	11	62.62	10	123.46
13	Mako Yamashita	185.56	4	67.28	13	118.28
14	Natsu Suzuki	170.13	15	59.93	14	110.20
15	Shiika Yoshioka	168.82	12	62.00	15	106.82
16	Hana Yoshida	163.78	19	58.79	17	104.99
17	Hina Takeno	163.06	20	57.04	16	106.02
18	Rika Hongo	160.85	17	59.05	19	101.80
19	Yuna Aoki	158.24	14	59.97	21	98.27
20	Mone Chiba	158.22	24	54.45	18	103.77
21	Akari Matsubara	155.46	21	56.25	20	99.21
22	Honoka Hirotani	149.58	22	55.27	22	94.31
23	Chisato Uramatsu	148.36	23	55.05	23	93.31
24	Yuka Nagai	146.94	18	58.99	24	87.95
Did not advance to free skating
25	Rika Oya	54.09	25	54.09	—N/a	
26	Ibuki Sato	53.71	26	53.71	—N/a	
27	Rinka Watanabe	46.18	27	46.18	—N/a	
28	Yura Matsuda	44.69	28	44.69	—N/a	
29	Riko Takino	43.69	29	43.69	—N/a	
WD	Marin Honda	withdrew	withdrew from competition			

=== Pairs ===
On November 24, the pairs event was cancelled due to the only entry, Riku Miura / Ryuichi Kihara, facing travel difficulties in returning to Japan from their Oakville, Ontario, Canada training base.

=== Ice dance ===
Rank	Name	Total points	RD		FD	
1	Misato Komatsubara / Tim Koleto	175.23	1	71.74	1	103.49
2	Kana Muramoto / Daisuke Takahashi	151.86	2	67.83	3	84.03
3	Rikako Fukase / Eichu Cho	145.18	3	62.02	4	83.16
4	Kiria Hirayama / Aru Tateno	143.40	4	56.61	2	86.79
5	Haruno Yajima / Yoshimitsu Ikeda	118.87	5	47.89	5	70.98

== Japan Junior Figure Skating Championships ==
The 2020–21 Japan Junior Figure Skating Championships were held in Hachinohe, Aomori from November 21–23, 2020. There was no junior pairs competition due to the lack of entries. The national champions in men's and ladies' singles would have earned automatic berths on the 2021 World Junior Championships team, before the competition was cancelled on November 24, 2020.

=== Entries ===
A list of preliminary entries was published on November 10, 2020. Names with an asterisk (*) denote novice skaters.

Men	Ladies	Ice dance
Shuntaro Asaga	Mone Chiba	Ayano Sasaki / Atsuhiko Tamura
Shuji Fujishiro	Maria Egawa	Kaho Yamashita / Yuto Nagata
Lucas Tsuyoshi Honda	Rie Imanaga	Utana Yoshida / Shingo Nishiyama
Keisuke Kadowaki	Saki Isomura	
Haru Kakiuchi	Haruna Iwasaki	
Takeru Kataise	Arisa Kamoi	
Kairi Kato	Hinako Katayama	
Ryusei Kikuchi	Ikura Kushida*	
Tomoki Kimura	Momoka Maeno	
Yuto Kishina	Rino Matsuike	
Kao Miura	Aiko Motoe	
Sena Miyake	Nana Muraoka	
Ryoga Morimoto	Ami Nakai*	
Shunsuke Nakamura	Marin Okamoto	
Rio Nakata*	Yurina Okuno	
Sakura Odagaki	Hono Segawa	
Masamune Okubo	Ayumi Shibayama*	
Ibuki Oonaka	Mao Shimada*	
Kosho Oshima	Sae Shimizu	
Haruya Sasaki	Rion Sumiyoshi	
Hikari Sato*	Natsu Suzuki	
Minato Shiga	Juria Tamura	
Tudoi Suto	Sakurako Tanabe	
Rei Suzuki	Azusa Tanaka	
Seigo Tauchi*	Ayu Terashima	
Tatsuya Tsuboi	Chisato Uramatsu	
Gen Watanabe	Kinayu Yokoi	
Tsukasa Yajima	Hana Yoshida	
Nozomu Yoshioka	Kinue Yoshii	
	Yuyu Yoshioka	

==== Novice ====
Top finishers at the Japan Novice Championships in men's and ladies' singles were added to the Japan Junior Championships.

	Men	Ladies
1	Rio Nakata	Mao Shimada
2	Seigo Tauchi	Ayumi Shibayama
3	Hikari Sato	Ami Nakai
4		Ikura Kushida

=== Schedule ===
Date	Discipline	Time	Segment
Saturday, November 21	All	18:30–19:00	Opening ceremony
Saturday, November 21	Ice dance	20:00–20:35	Rhythm dance
Sunday, November 22	Men	12:20–16:00	Short program
Sunday, November 22	Ice dance	16:15–16:53	Free dance
Sunday, November 22	Ladies	17:10–20:50	Short program
Monday, November 23	Men	11:40–15:00	Free skating
Monday, November 23	Ladies	15:25–18:45	Free skating
All times are listed in local time (UTC+9:00).

=== Results ===
==== Junior men ====
Rank	Name	Total points	SP		FS	
1	Lucas Tsuyoshi Honda	209.48	1	80.35	3	129.13
2	Kao Miura	207.71	5	71.56	1	136.15
3	Sena Miyake	203.53	2	75.28	4	128.25
4	Yuto Kishina	201.73	3	73.85	5	127.88
5	Kosho Oshima	198.84	6	68.06	2	130.78
6	Shunsuke Nakamura	182.23	8	66.58	6	115.65
7	Tatsuya Tsuboi	180.56	4	73.18	10	107.38
8	Keisuke Kadowaki	173.95	10	64.27	8	109.68
9	Shuntaro Asaga	173.50	11	60.59	7	112.91
10	Takeru Amine Kataise	172.11	7	67.19	11	104.92
11	Nozomu Yoshioka	168.88	9	64.75	12	104.13
12	Ryoga Morimoto	167.34	12	58.40	9	108.94
13	Haru Kakiuchi	159.84	13	57.32	13	102.52
14	Sakura Odagaki	146.87	15	52.51	17	94.36
15	Rei Suzuki	145.39	21	47.76	14	97.63
16	Seigo Tauchi	144.79	18	49.50	16	95.29
17	Rio Nakata	144.08	20	47.94	15	96.14
18	Ibuki Oonaka	138.06	22	47.44	18	90.62
19	Kairi Kato	132.30	17	49.62	21	82.68
20	Ryusei Kikuchi	131.10	14	56.37	24	74.73
21	Shuji Fujishiro	130.84	16	52.32	23	78.52
22	Haruya Sasaki	130.14	19	48.39	22	81.75
23	Hikari Sato	130.09	24	46.17	19	83.92
24	Tomoki Kimura	130.00	23	46.31	20	83.69
Did not advance to free skating
25	Tsukasa Yajima	45.35	25	45.35	—N/a	
26	Masamune Okubo	43.75	26	43.75	—N/a	
27	Tudoi Suto	41.59	27	41.59	—N/a	
28	Minato Shiga	40.51	28	40.51	—N/a	
29	Gen Watanabe	33.73	29	33.73	—N/a	

==== Junior ladies ====
Rank	Name	Total points	SP		FS	
1	Rino Matsuike	198.38	1	69.06	1	129.32
2	Hana Yoshida	189.49	2	62.05	2	127.44
3	Mao Shimada	173.44	6	57.89	3	115.55
4	Ayumi Shibayama	170.68	4	58.08	4	112.60
5	Rion Sumiyoshi	170.37	3	59.96	5	110.41
6	Ami Nakai	166.32	7	56.54	6	109.78
7	Natsu Suzuki	159.32	10	54.78	7	104.54
8	Mone Chiba	152.47	13	53.17	8	99.30
9	Chisato Uramatsu	149.86	5	57.96	12	91.90
10	Maria Egawa	147.21	9	54.89	11	92.32
11	Juria Tamura	143.31	16	49.65	9	93.66
12	Ikura Kushida	142.87	12	53.21	13	89.66
13	Yurina Okuno	140.05	8	55.98	19	84.07
14	Arisa Kamoi	139.80	11	54.40	15	85.40
15	Azusa Tanaka	139.27	14	51.25	14	88.02
16	Sae Shimizu	138.44	23	45.03	10	93.41
17	Haruna Iwasaki	135.54	15	50.67	16	84.87
18	Kinayu Yokoi	131.87	18	48.65	20	83.22
19	Aiko Motoe	131.20	17	49.23	22	81.97
20	Momoka Maeno	130.36	19	47.96	21	82.40
21	Marin Okamoto	130.12	20	45.70	18	84.42
22	Hinako Katayama	130.06	21	45.50	17	84.56
23	Saki Isomura	126.65	22	45.39	23	81.26
24	Rie Imanaga	119.39	24	44.21	24	75.18
Did not advance to free skating
25	Hono Segawa	43.97	25	43.97	—N/a	
26	Ayu Terashima	43.55	26	43.55	—N/a	
27	Nana Muraoka	42.81	27	42.81	—N/a	
28	Kinue Yoshii	40.21	28	40.21	—N/a	
29	Sakurako Tanabe	38.73	29	38.73	—N/a	
30	Yuyu Yoshioka	33.66	30	33.66	—N/a	

==== Junior ice dance ====
Rank	Name	Total points	RD		FD	
1	Utana Yoshida / Shingo Nishiyama	149.80	1	58.74	1	91.06
2	Ayano Sasaki / Atsuhiko Tamura	98.11	2	36.85	2	61.26
3	Kaho Yamashita / Yuto Nagata	89.05	3	33.89	3	55.16

== International team selections ==
=== World Championships ===
The 2021 World Championships were held in Stockholm, Sweden from March 22–28, 2021. Japan Skating Federation announced the team on December 28, 2020.

Muramoto/Takahashi were removed as first alternates as they were unable to submit a video to the ISU to attain TES minimums.

	Men	Ladies	Pairs	Ice dance
1	Yuzuru Hanyu	Rika Kihira	Riku Miura / Ryuichi Kihara	Misato Komatsubara / Tim Koleto
2	Shoma Uno	Kaori Sakamoto		
3	Yuma Kagiyama	Satoko Miyahara		
1st alt.	Keiji Tanaka	Rino Matsuike		~~Kana Muramoto / Daisuke Takahashi*~~
2nd alt.	Kazuki Tomono	Wakaba Higuchi		Rikako Fukase / Eichu Cho
3rd alt.	Shun Sato	Mai Mihara		

* Pending attainment of senior TES minimums

=== Four Continents Championships ===
The 2021 Four Continents Championships, to be held from February 9–14, 2021 in Sydney, Australia, were cancelled.

=== World Junior Championships ===
Commonly referred to as "Junior Worlds", the 2021 World Junior Championships, scheduled to take place in Harbin, China from March 1–7, 2021, were cancelled on November 24, 2020.
