= Eiji Iwamoto =

Japanese figure skater

Personal information
- Born: August 1, 1980 (age 46) Tottori, Japan

Figure skating career
- Country: Japan
- Retired: 2003

Eiji Iwamoto (岩本 英嗣, Iwamoto Eiji; born August 1, 1980) is a Japanese former competitive figure skater. He is the 1999 Triglav Trophy champion and competed at the 2000 World Junior Championships, where he placed 24th. He competed in three seasons of the ISU Junior Grand Prix, winning the silver medal at the 1998 event in Mexico. His highest placement at the senior Japanese Championships was 6th. Iwamoto retired from competitive skating following his graduation from university. He now works as a coach and choreographer.

== Competitive highlights ==
JGP: Junior Series/Junior Grand Prix

International
| Event | 96–97 | 97–98 | 98–99 | 99–00 | 00–01 | 01–02 | 02–03 |
|---|---|---|---|---|---|---|---|
| Triglav Trophy | 2nd | | 1st | | | | |
| Universiade | | | | | 11th | | 8th |
International: Junior
| Junior Worlds | | | | 24th | | | |
| JGP Bulgaria | | 5th | | | | | |
| JGP Czech Rep. | | | | 11th | | | |
| JGP Hungary | | | 7th | | | | |
| JGP Japan | | | | 13th | | | |
| JGP Mexico | | | 2nd | | | | |
| JGP Ukraine | | 10th | | | | | |
National
| Japan Champ. | | | | 6th | 7th | 7th | 7th |
| Japan Junior | 4th | 4th | 4th | 1st | | | |
