= Rino Matsuike =

Japanese figure skater (born 2004)

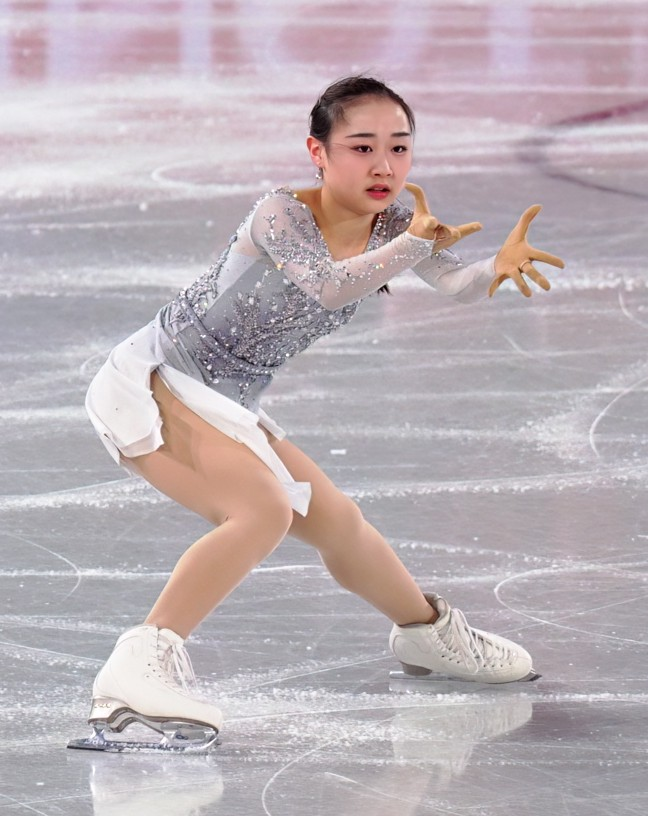
- Matsuike performing her free skate at 2024–25 Grand Prix Final

Personal information
- Native name: 松生 理乃
- Born: October 10, 2004 (age 22) Nagoya, Japan
- Home town: Nagoya
- Height: 1.51 m (4 ft 11 1/2 in)

Figure skating career
- Country: Japan
- Coach: Machiko Yamada; Yuko Hongo; Soshi Tanaka
- Skating club: Chukyo University
- Began skating: 2012

Rino Matsuike (/ˈriːnoʊ mætsuˈiːkeɪ/ REE-noh mat-soo-EE-kay; Japanese: 松生 理乃, IPA: [matsɯꜜike ɾiꜜno]; born October 10, 2004) is a Japanese figure skater. She is a six-time ISU Grand Prix medalist (two silver, four bronze) and finished fifth at the 2022 Four Continents Championships, winning a small bronze medal for her free skate. She is also the 2022 International Challenge Cup champion.

On the junior level, she is the 2020–21 Japanese junior national champion and the 2019 JGP Latvia bronze medalist.

== Personal life ==
Matsuike was born on October 10, 2004, in Nagoya, about a month premature. After graduating from Chukyo High School, she enrolled into Chukyo University in 2021, where she currently studies at the Department of Sports Management. She has also studied Korean as a second language at the university.

== Career ==
=== Early career ===
Matsuike began skating in 2010 at the age of six and decided to begin training seriously at age nine. A fan of Mao Asada, Matsuike then joined the Nagoya Sports Center to train under Asada's former coaches, Machiko Yamada and Mihoko Higuchi.

Matsuike competed at the Japan Novice Championships twice, finishing 14th in 2016–17 and 11th in 2017–18. She moved up to juniors the following year, finishing eighth at the 2018–19 Japan Junior Championships.

=== 2019–2020 season ===
Matsuike described her training regime as she entered the 2019–2020 season as "grueling"; she would not leave the rink until she had successfully skated both her programs twice, even when she was driven to the point of tears or staying after everyone else had gone home. She said that she would sometimes practice until she could no longer walk, which affected both her physical and mental health.

She made her junior international debut at 2019 JGP Latvia, winning the bronze medal behind Lee Hae-in and Daria Usacheva. She was the first Japanese lady to medal in her junior international debut since Rika Kihira in 2016–17. Matsuike was scheduled to compete at 2019 JGP Italy, but she withdrew due to injury.

At the 2019–20 Japan Junior Championships in November, Matsuike was third in the short program but 14th in the free skate to fall to ninth overall. As a result, she did not qualify for the senior Championships and did not make the 2020 Winter Youth Olympics or the 2020 World Junior Championships teams.

=== 2020–2021 season ===
Due to the cancellation of the Junior Grand Prix, Matsuike opened her season on the domestic qualifying circuit. She won the Chubu Regionals and the Western Sectionals en route to the 2020–21 Japan Junior Championships title. Matsuike won by nearly ten points over Hana Yoshida and Mao Shimada. Her win would have qualified her for a spot on the 2021 World Junior Championships team, but the event was cancelled.

Matsuike made her senior international debut at the 2020 NHK Trophy, winning bronze behind Kaori Sakamoto and Wakaba Higuchi. She called the event "a real confidence booster" and "that it [was] an honor to be skating here at NHK Trophy, so [she] wanted to enjoy every moment." Matsuike aimed to further develop her skills after competing alongside the seniors, but her performance drew praise from international commentators, including Ted Barton.

Matsuike made her senior Japan Championships debut, placing seventh in the short program after a fall on a non-element but otherwise executing the program cleanly. She was fourth in the free skate, receiving an under rotation on one jump and an edge call on her triple flip, and rose to fourth place overall. As a result of her placement, Matsuike was named first alternate for the 2021 World Championships team, pending her attainment of senior TES minimums. Reflecting on the event later, Matsuike said that while she appreciated the unique styles of the other skaters, such as the medalists Satoko Miyahara and Kaori Sakamoto, but said that at the time she was not yet aware of what her own style was.

=== 2021–2022 season ===
Matsuike was assigned as a host pick to the 2021 NHK Trophy; she twisted her ankle in practice three weeks beforehand. She struggled to land her jumps in training due to her injury. At the NHK Trophy, she finished in sixth place. She had begun attempting a triple Axel in competition that season at Japanese domestic competitions, but due to recovery from her injury, did not attempt one at NHK. She was eighth at the 2021 Rostelecom Cup, her second Grand Prix. She expressed "many regrets about both of my programs" but said that she was focused on increasing her technical difficulty in the future to compete with the top Russian skaters.

At the 2021–22 Japan Championships, Matsuike placed seventh. She was named as third alternate for the Japanese Olympic team and assigned to compete at the 2022 Four Continents Championships. A poor short program left Matsuike in eighth place at Four Continents going in the free skate, after falling on a triple flip attempt and stepping out of her jump combination. She went on to skate a clean free skate, other than an edge call on the triple flip, placing third in that segment and winning a bronze small medal. She rose to fifth overall. Matsuike reflected on her season, saying she had had "a lot of regrets" about earlier events and the short program, but that "I was crying and really under pressure, but I was able to push myself, and today's performance was good." She expressed a hope of adding more difficult technical content in the following season. Matsuike finished the season at the International Challenge Cup, winning the gold medal.

=== 2022–2023 season ===
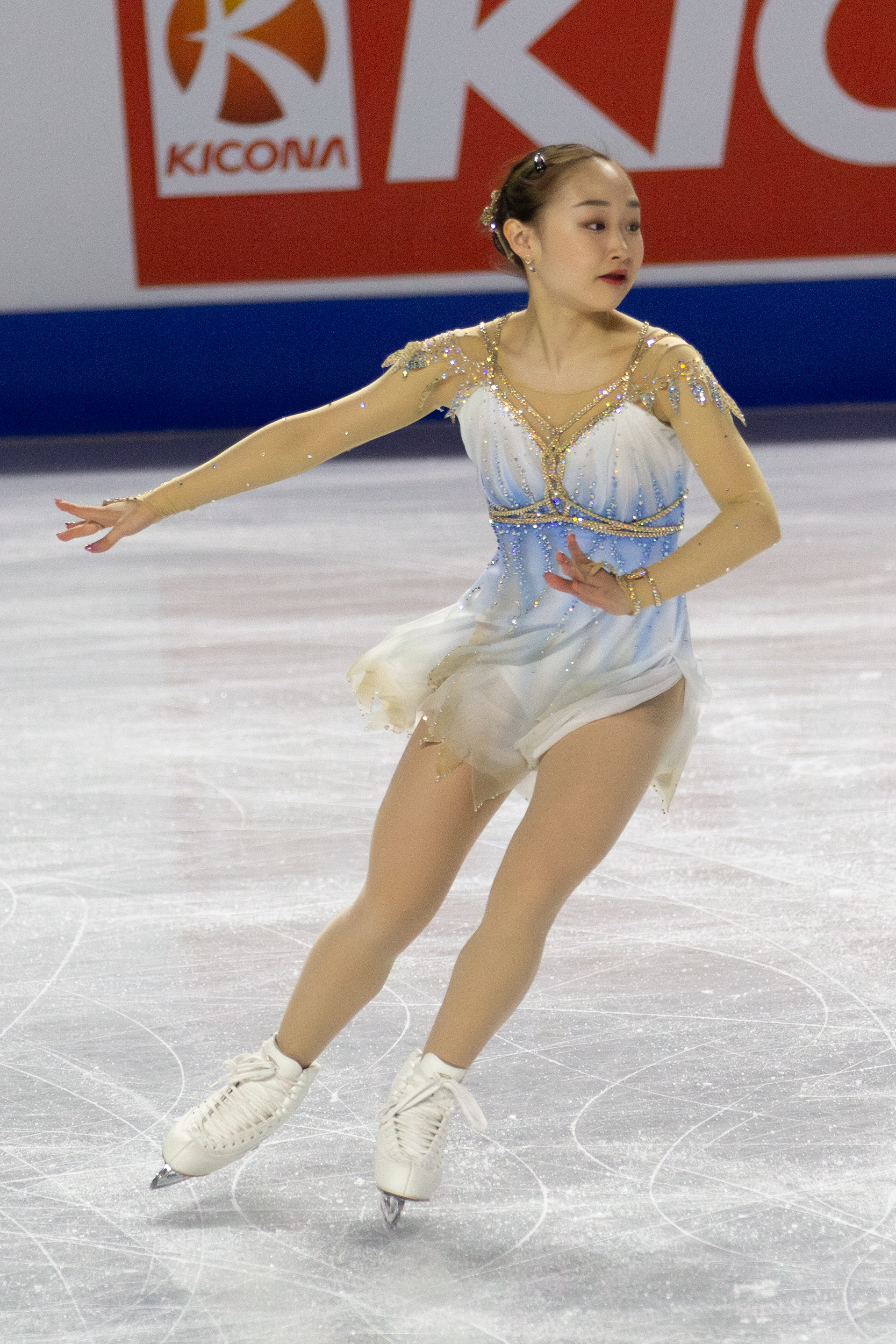
Matsuike during her free skate at 2023 Skate Canada International

Matsuike was ill with gastroenteritis before 2022 Skate America and did not want to compete. After placing eighth in the short program, she withdrew before the free skate due to her illness. She then went on to compete at the 2022 Grand Prix de France, where she subsequently finished in seventh place.

Matsuike came thirteenth at the 2022–23 Japan Championships. She had originally planned to quit competing after the Japan Championships, as she was struggling physically in practice and no longer enjoyed the thought of competing. Her mother suggested she to wait until after the Championships to retire. At the Championships, she received a standing ovation for her free skate, which encouraged her to continue training. She credited fellow skaters Sōta Yamamoto and Mako Yamashita for helping change her mindset with their approaches to training.

=== 2023–2024 season ===
Originally without a Grand Prix assignment, Matsuike was assigned to the 2023 Skate Canada International after the withdrawal of compatriot Rika Kihira. Despite dealing with some underrotation calls on her jumps, she finished third and won her second Grand Prix medal. Matsuike said that while there had been mistakes, "overall I put it all together. I wasn't even supposed to be at an event like this and I was just happy to be here and be in good health." Matsuike finished seventeenth at the 2023–24 Japan Championships.

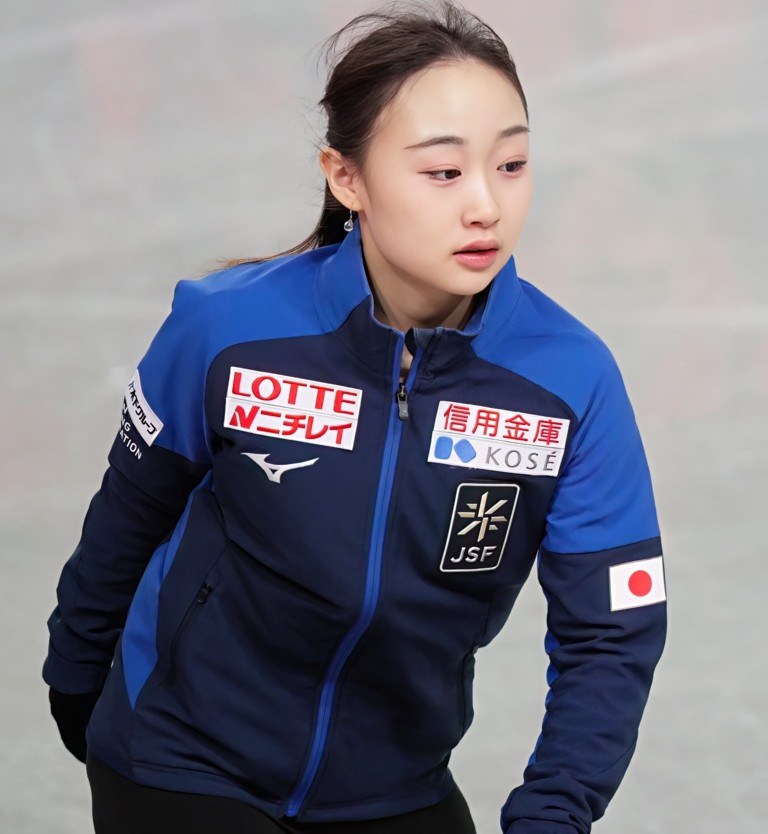
Matsuike during practice at the 2024–25 Grand Prix Final

=== 2024–2025 season ===
Matsuike began her season at the 2024 Skate Canada International, placing tenth after the short program after a downgrade on her double Axel and fall and downgrade on her triple lutz. However, she came back in the free skate with a score of 139.85, placing first in the free program segment ahead of three-time world champion and teammate Kaori Sakamoto and taking the silver medal overall. Her rise of eight placements was the highest jump in placements seen at an ISU Grand Prix, matching that previously achieved by Amber Glenn and Jeremy Abbott. "I'm really full of happiness to make the podium," Matsuike said. “I made some serious mistakes in the short program and my placement was such that I wasn’t expecting to make the podium. Matsuike later shared that after her "heartbreaking" short program, her mother had sent her a Line message, telling her to "always love yourself," which in turn helped give her the strength to deliver a strong free program. Following the event, Christopher Tin, the musician who composed Matsuike's free program music, praised her performance on his social media accounts.

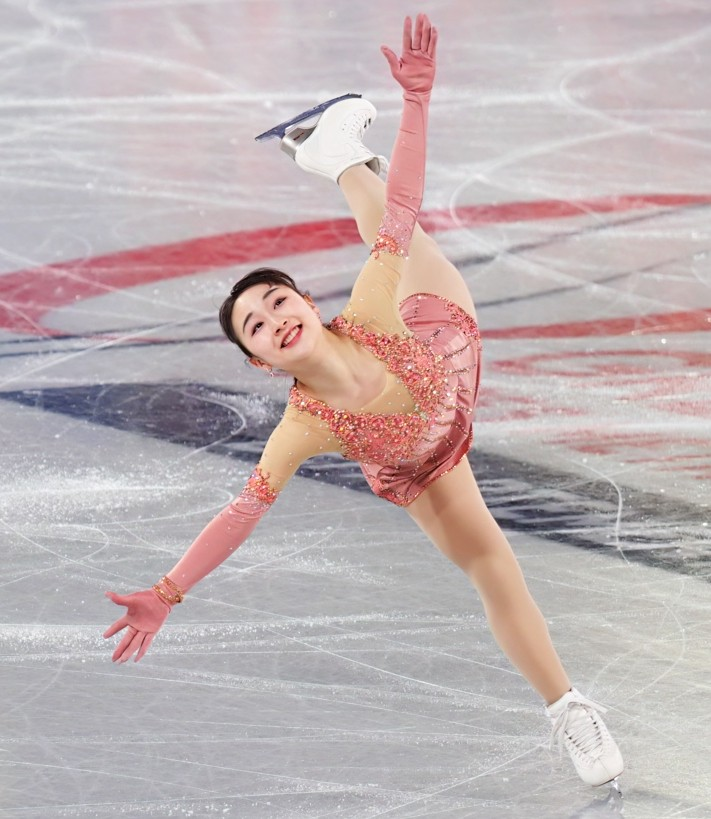
Matsuike performing a spiral at the 2024–25 Grand Prix Final

At the 2024 Finlandia Trophy, her second Grand Prix assignment, Matsuike placed fourth after the short program following a fall on her triple flip. However, she placed first in the free skate and second overall, narrowly missing out on the gold medal to compatriot Hana Yoshida by 0.26 points. “I was indeed very nervous, but I tried not to think about the Final too much and just skate," she said after the free skate. I am very happy now."

Matsuike's two silver medal results on the Grand Prix series allowed her to qualify for the 2024–25 Grand Prix Final in Grenoble, France. She competed at the Grand Prix Final in December and finished in sixth place after receiving under-rotation calls on four of her jumping passes in the free skate. Matsuike said that she "really felt like I am still lacking" but that she hoped to make good use of the experience looking forward to the Japan Figure Skating Championships later in the month. After the free skate, she said: "Yesterday I was not anxious at all, but today I was quite stressed, so I think I was a little stiff. I’m a little disappointed that some of my jumps were unstable, and I think I still have progress to make. But I tried my best to skate confidently. I want to do my best at the Japan Championships."

Two weeks later, she competed at the 2024–25 Japan Championships, finishing in fifth place. Matsuike was subsequently named to the Four Continents team. She was also selected as the first alternate for the 2025 World Championship team.

In January, Matsuike competed at the 2025 Four Continents Championships in Seoul, South Korea, where she finished in eleventh place.

=== 2025–2026 season ===
Matsuike opened her season by finishing eighth at the 2025 CS Lombardia Trophy. The following month, she competed at the 2025 Cup of China, finishing in sixth place overall.

In November, Matsuike took bronze at 2025 Finlandia Trophy, her fifth Grand Prix medal. "Before coming to Helsinki, I wasn't able to really build the practice that I wanted," she said after the free skate. "But this performance gave me the confidence. I really enjoyed hearing audience cheers here at this arena and I hope my performance left something in audience heart." The following month, she competed at the 2025–26 Japan Championships, where she finished eleventh overall.

=== 2026–2027 season ===
Matsuike began her international season at the 2026 Skate America, her only Grand Prix assignment. She earned a personal best of 70.30 in the short program and placed 5th in that competition segment. In the free skate, she received an quarter rotation call and an under-rotation call on her triple-triple combination but had no major mistakes. She placed 2nd in that segment with high component scores and earned a personal best total score of 211.63, and she rose to win the bronze medal. Matsuike said of her performance, "I'm happy that for the first time in a while, I felt that practicing hard brought results." "I was not really also focusing on the score," she said. "So, I'm really happy that I was able to realize what I had hoped for and the results came with it."

== Programs ==
Season	Short program	Free skating	Exhibition
2026–2027	Under Paris Skies performed by Stacey Kent choreo. by David Wilson	Suite bergamasque; IV. Passepied; III. Clair de lune by Claude Debussy performed by Seong-Jin Cho choreo. by Lori Nichol	
2025–2026	Lux Aeterna by Christopher Tin choreo. by Lori Nichol	The Nutcracker Suite by Pyotr Ilyich Tchaikovsky performed by HAUSER, London Symphony Orchestra, & Robert Ziegler choreo. by Lori Nichol	
2024–2025	One Day I'll Fly Away (from Moulin Rouge!) performed by Nicole Kidman choreo. by Noriko Sato	Lux Aeterna by Christopher Tin choreo. by Lori Nichol	Ain't We Got Fun by Richard A. Whiting performed by Renee Olstead choreo. by Noriko Sato; Skinny Love by Justin Vernon performed by Birdy choreo. by Kanako Murakami
2023–2024	One Day I'll Fly Away (from Moulin Rouge!) performed by Nicole Kidman choreo. by Noriko Sato	Nella Fantasia by Ennio Morricone performed by Sarah Àlainn choreo. by Kenji Miyamoto; Adiós Nonino by Astor Piazzolla performed by Ryōta Komatsu choreo. by Kenji Miyamoto	Adiós Nonino by Astor Piazzolla performed by Ryōta Komatsu choreo. by Kenji Miyamoto
2022–2023	Papa, Can You Hear Me? by Michel Legrand performed by Barbra Streisand choreo. by Noriko Sato	Nella Fantasia by Ennio Morricone performed by Sarah Àlainn choreo. by Kenji Miyamoto	Skinny Love by Justin Vernon performed by Birdy choreo. by Kanako Murakami
2021–2022	A Quoi Ca Sert l'Amour by Michel Emer performed by L' Escargot choreo. by Mihoko Higuchi	Moonlight (Based on Beethoven's Moonlight Sonata) by Victoria Tocca, Jennifer Thomas choreo. by Mihoko Higuchi	Say Something by A Great Big World, Mike Campbell performed by Pentatonix
2020–2021	The Color Purple by Quincy Jones choreo. by Mihoko Higuchi	Perhaps Love by John Denver, Plácido Domingo performed by Jonathan and Charlotte choreo. by Mihoko Higuchi	The Color Purple by Quincy Jones choreo. by Mihoko Higuchi; Spanish Dance No. 1 (from La vida breve) by Manuel de Falla performed by Kristina & Laura choreo. by Mihoko Higuchi
2019–2020	The Color Purple by Quincy Jones choreo. by Mihoko Higuchi	Dryades Pan by Karol Szymanowski; Variation on an Original Theme, Op. 15 by Henryk Wieniawski choreo. by Mihoko Higuchi	

== Competitive highlights ==
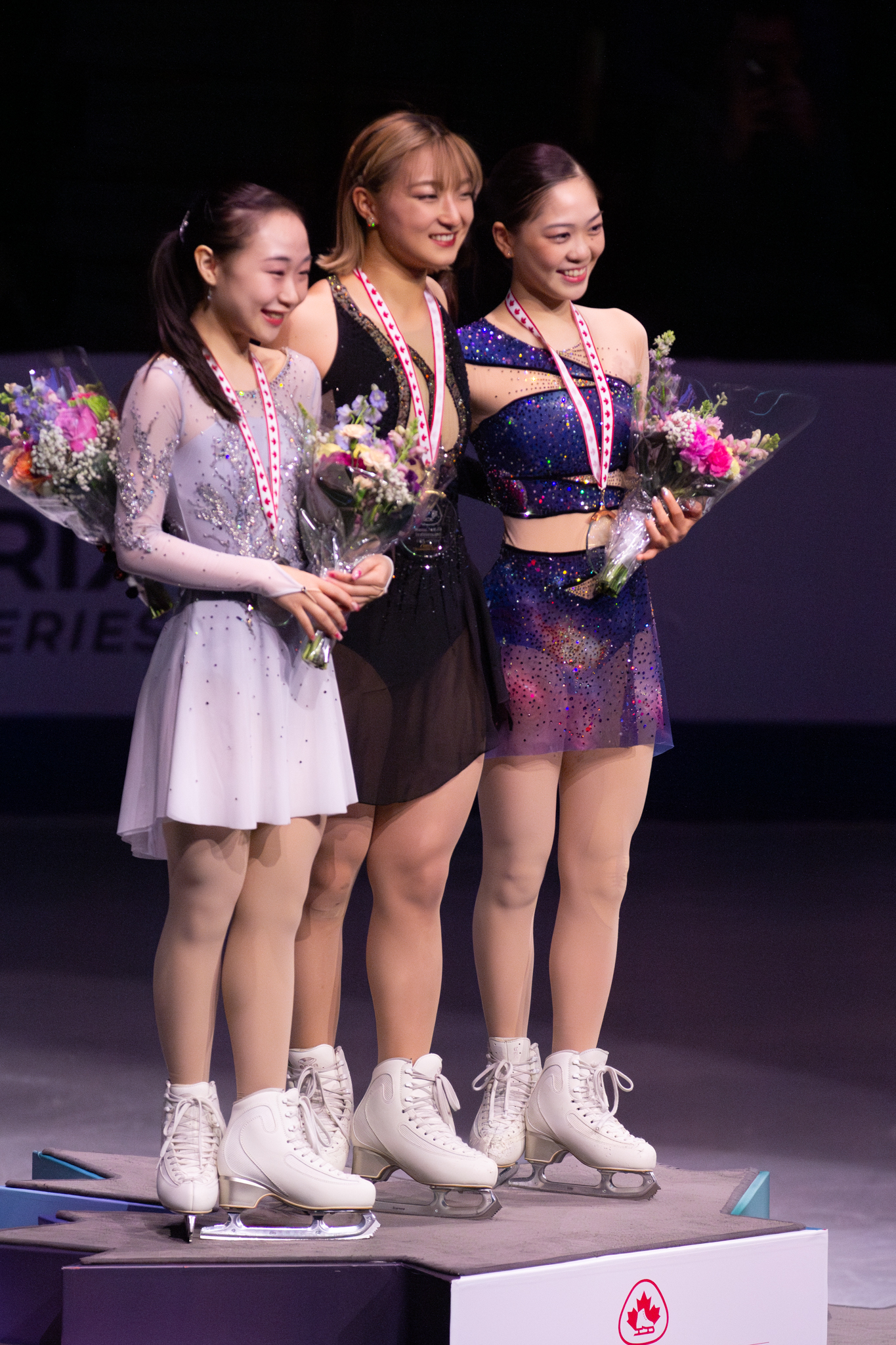
Matsuike (left) on the podium with the other medalists at 2024 Skate Canada International

=== Senior results ===
- GP – Event of the ISU Grand Prix Series
- JGP – Event of the ISU Junior Grand Prix Series
- CS – Event of the ISU Challenger Series
- TBD – Assigned
- WD – Withdrew from competition
- Medals at team events are awarded for the team results only. Individual placements at team events are listed in parentheses.

Competition placements at senior level
Season	2020–21	2021–22	2022–23	2023–24	2024–25	2025–26	2026–27
Four Continents Championships		5th			11th		
Grand Prix Final					6th		
Japan Championships	4th	7th	13th	17th	5th	11th	
GP Cup of China						6th	
GP Finland					2nd	3rd	
GP NHK Trophy	3rd	6th					
GP France			7th				
GP Skate Canada				3rd	2nd		
GP Skate America			WD				3rd
GP Rostelecom Cup		8th					
CS Lombardia Trophy						8th	
Challenge Cup		1st					
Japan Open		2nd (2nd)					

=== Junior results ===
Competition placements at junior level
Season	2018-19	2019-20	2020-21
Japan Championships	8th	9th	1st
JGP Latvia		3rd	

== Detailed results ==
ISU personal best scores in the +5/-5 GOE System
Segment	Type	Score	Event
Total	**TSS**	**211.63**	2026 Skate America
Short program	**TSS**	**70.30**	2026 Skate America
Short program	TES	38.18	2019 JGP Latvia
Short program	PCS	33.24	2026 Skate America
Free skating	**TSS**	**142.05**	2022 Four Continents Championships
Free skating	TES	76.57	2022 Four Continents Championships
Free skating	PCS	68.09	2026 Skate America

Small medals for short and free programs awarded only at ISU Championships.

=== Senior results ===
- Small medals for the short program and free skating are only awarded at ISU Championships.
- ISU Personal Bests highlighted in bold.

Results in the 2020–21 season
Date	Event	SP		FS		Total	
Date	Event	P	Score	P	Score	P	Score
Nov 27–29, 2020	(Japan) 2020 NHK Trophy	4	65.74	2	133.23	3	198.97
Dec 24–27, 2020	2020–21 Japan Championships	7	65.57	4	139.17	4	204.74

Results in the 2021–22 season
Date	Event	SP		FS		Total	
Date	Event	P	Score	P	Score	P	Score
Oct 3, 2021	2021 Japan Open	—N/a	—N/a	2	135.12	2	—N/a
Nov 12–14, 2021	(Japan) 2021 NHK Trophy	7	63.24	5	122.83	6	186.17
Nov 26–28, 2021	(Russia) 2021 Rostelecom Cup	7	62.98	8	121.38	8	184.36
Dec 22–26, 2021	2021–22 Japan Championships	6	72.31	7	126.46	7	198.77
Jan 18–23, 2022	(Estonia) 2022 Four Continents Championships	8	60.16	3	**142.05**	5	202.21
Feb 24–27, 2022	(Netherlands) 2022 Challenge Cup	1	74.21	1	150.13	1	224.34

Results in the 2022–23 season
Date	Event	SP		FS		Total	
Date	Event	P	Score	P	Score	P	Score
Oct 21–23, 2022	(United States) 2022 Skate America	8	59.50	–	–	–	WD
Nov 4–6, 2022	2022 Grand Prix de France	9	57.68	6	118.84	7	176.52
Dec 21–25, 2022	2022–23 Japan Championships	20	56.01	13	123.84	13	179.85

Results in the 2023–24 season
Date	Event	SP		FS		Total	
Date	Event	P	Score	P	Score	P	Score
Oct 27–29, 2023	2023 Skate Canada International	3	66.29	3	132.33	3	198.62
Dec 20–24, 2023	2023–24 Japan Championships	12	58.97	15	115.37	17	174.34

Results in the 2024–25 season
Date	Event	SP		FS		Total	
Date	Event	P	Score	P	Score	P	Score
Oct 25–27, 2024	2024 Skate Canada International	10	52.31	1	139.85	2	192.16
Nov 15–17, 2024	(Finland) 2024 Finlandia Trophy	4	64.82	1	134.38	2	199.20
Dec 5–8, 2024	(France) 2024–25 Grand Prix Final	5	62.63	6	126.39	6	189.02
Dec 19–22, 2024	2024–25 Japan Championships	5	70.79	5	133.21	5	204.00
Feb 19–23, 2025	(South Korea) 2025 Four Continents Championships	13	55.07	9	122.03	11	177.10

Results in the 2025–26 season
Date	Event	SP		FS		Total	
Date	Event	P	Score	P	Score	P	Score
Sep 11–14, 2025	(Italy) 2025 CS Lombardia Trophy	7	63.30	8	107.33	8	170.72
Oct 24–26, 2025	2025 Cup of China	6	65.91	6	122.15	6	188.06
Nov 21–23, 2025	(Finland) 2025 Finlandia Trophy	6	61.26	3	131.95	3	193.21
Dec 18–21, 2025	2025–26 Japan Championships	16	61.26	10	128.94	11	190.20

Results in the 2026–27 season
Date	Event	SP		FS		Total	
Date	Event	P	Score	P	Score	P	Score
Nov 13–15, 2026	(United States) 2026 Skate America	5	**70.30**	2	141.33	3	**211.63**

=== Junior results ===
Results in the 2018-19 season
Date	Event	SP		FS		Total	
Date	Event	P	Score	P	Score	P	Score
Nov 23–25, 2018	2018–19 Japan Junior Championships	7	53.62	10	97.00	8	150.62

Results in the 2019-20 season
Date	Event	SP		FS		Total	
Date	Event	P	Score	P	Score	P	Score
Sep 4–7, 2019	2019 JGP Latvia	4	66.41	2	126.62	3	193.03
Nov 14–17, 2019	2019–20 Japan Junior Championships	3	61.91	14	94.79	9	156.70

Results in the 2020-21 season
Date	Event	SP		FS		Total	
Date	Event	P	Score	P	Score	P	Score
Nov 21–23, 2020	2020–21 Japan Junior Championships	1	69.06	1	129.32	1	198.38
