= Mihoko Higuchi =

Japanese figure skating coach and choreographer

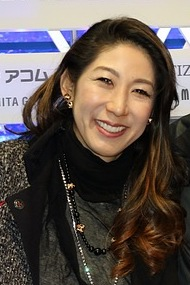
- Higuchi at the 2017 Grand Prix Final.

Personal information
- Native name: 樋口美穂子
- Born: May 13, 1969 (age 57) Nagoya, Aichi Prefecture, Japan
- Height: 1.61 m (5 ft 3 in)

Figure skating career
- Country: Japan
- Retired: 1990

Mihoko Higuchi (樋口美穂子, Higuchi Mihoko; born May 13, 1969) is a Japanese figure skating coach, choreographer, and former competitive figure skater.

== Early life ==
Higuchi was born on May 13, 1969, in Nagoya, Aichi Prefecture, Japan. She has two older brothers. Her interest in teaching dates back to elementary school.

== Career ==
Higuchi's older brothers played ice hockey, and she began taking skating lessons at age 5. Her first competition was on an outdoor rink at night, where it was difficult for her to keep a sense of direction. She enjoyed compulsory figures and jumping.

Throughout her figure skating career, Higuchi was coached by Machiko Yamada and trained alongside Midori Ito, who was also a classmate of hers in junior high school. Higuchi won the silver medal at the 1980–81 Japan Junior Championships.

During her career, as Yamada accompanied Ito to more overseas competitions, Higuchi began to act as a temporary coach for the younger skaters when Yamada was absent. She began choreographing her own programs at a young age, while she was in middle school, and then started to choreograph for others at the rink. During her three years in high school, she placed 13th, 20th, and 21st at the Japan Championships.

She retired from competition after compulsory figures, on which she spent three-fourths of her training time, were removed from competition in 1990.

== Coaching and choreography career ==
Higuchi graduated from Chukyo University.

Following her retirement from competitive figure skating in 1990 at the age of twenty, Higuchi became the coaching assistant of her long-time coach Machiko Yamada and a choreographer at the Grand Prix Tokai Figure Skating Club in Nagoya. As figure skating grew more popular, she choreographed programs for around 50 students a year.

Higuchi describes her choreography process as one where she does not intentionally search out music for a particular skater or program, but instead constantly listens to music and is inspired by pieces she hears. She primarily works with her own students, as she is interested in not only in the choreography itself but the collaborative process of reworking the program through the season. She has created more than 1,000 programs.

She worked with Yamada until March 2022, when she left the Grand Prix Tokai Figure Skating Club to establish the LYS (Let Yourself Shine) Figure Skating Club in Aichi, where she acts as the head coach. She works alongside her son, who is a physical trainer. Speaking about her goals, she said, "I have always truly had this desire to teach children from a young age and help them develop. I want to offer my students a comprehensive teaching in figure skating, covering both physical and mental coaching aspects, right from the start."

In May 2025, she moved her academy from Aichi to Niigata and began working with fellow coach Takato Tamura.

Her current and former students include:

- Mao Asada
- Mai Asada
- Phattaratida Kaneshige
- Mana Kawabe
- Yukari Nakano
- Rino Matsuike
- Kanako Murakami
- Rena Uezono
- Shoma Uno
- Sōta Yamamoto
- Mako Yamashita

As a choreographer, Higuchi has worked with:

- Mao Asada
- Mai Asada
- Mana Kawabe
- Yuto Kishina
- Rino Matsuike
- Satoko Miyahara
- Haruna Murakami
- Kanako Murakami
- Yukari Nakano
- Haruya Sasaki
- Lucas Tsuyoshi Honda
- Rena Uezono
- Shoma Uno
- Sōta Yamamoto
- Mako Yamashita

== Competitive highlights ==
National
Event	1980–81
Japan Junior	2nd
