= Japan Open (figure skating) =

Annual international figure skating competition

The Japan Open is an annual senior international figure skating team competition organized by the Japan Skating Federation. From 1997 until 2001, Japan Open was an individual competition in all four figure skating disciplines. The current format, a team competition, was established in 2006. The competition is held every autumn in Japan. Invited skaters compete in men's and women’s singles. Skaters perform a free program but no short. Individual results are combined for a team standing.

== 2023 ==
The 2023 competition was held on October 7, 2023 at the Saitama Super Arena.

=== Men ===
Rank	Name	Nation	Points
1	Ilia Malinin	United States	193.91
2	Kazuki Tomono	Japan	177.72
3	Koshiro Shimada	Japan	164.26
4	Kevin Aymoz	France	155.20
5	Jason Brown	United States	144.38
6	Morisi Kvitelashvili	Georgia	125.17

=== Women ===
Rank	Name	Nation	Points
1	Kaori Sakamoto	Japan	149.59
2	Loena Hendrickx	Belgium	140.31
3	Isabeau Levito	United States	135.63
4	Satoko Miyahara	Japan	123.22
5	Kimmy Repond	Switzerland	122.63
6	Mariah Bell	United States	103.95

=== Team result ===
Rank	Name	Total points
1	Team Japan	614.79
2	Team North America	577.87
3	Team Europe	543.31

== 2022 ==
The 2022 competition was held on October 8, 2022 at the Saitama Super Arena.

=== Men ===
Rank	Name	Nation	Points
1	Shoma Uno	Japan	193.80
2	Ilia Malinin	United States	193.42
3	Kao Miura	Japan	169.94
4	Daniel Grassl	Italy	166.21
5	Jason Brown	United States	163.57
6	Michal Březina	Czech Republic	98.26

=== Women ===
Rank	Name	Nation	Points
1	Kaori Sakamoto	Japan	146.66
2	Loena Hendrickx	Belgium	132.53
3	Mariah Bell	United States	119.40
4	Ekaterina Kurakova	Poland	115.49
5	Rika Kihira	Japan	113.44
6	Mirai Nagasu	United States	100.88

=== Team result ===
Rank	Name	Total points
1	Team Japan	623.84
2	Team North America	577.27
3	Team Europe	512.49

== 2021 ==
The 2021 competition was held on October 2, 2021 at the Saitama Super Arena.

Like the previous year, due to the COVID-19 pandemic, the competition featured two teams composed entirely of domestic Japanese skaters, rather than the traditional three teams drawn from their respective regions (Europe, Japan, and North America) However, only senior amateur skaters were included, whereas traditionally, professional skaters are also included and the previous year featured several junior skaters as well.

=== Men ===
Rank	Name	Team	Points
1	(Japan) Shoma Uno	Team Blue	181.21
2	(Japan) Shun Sato	Team Blue	179.32
3	(Japan) Keiji Tanaka	Team Red	163.93
4	(Japan) Sōta Yamamoto	Team Blue	156.13
5	(Japan) Kazuki Tomono	Team Red	147.44
4	(Japan) Sena Miyake	Team Red	126.46

=== Women ===
Rank	Name	Team	Points
1	(Japan) Wakaba Higuchi	Team Blue	136.27
2	(Japan) Rino Matsuike	Team Red	135.12
3	(Japan) Mana Kawabe	Team Red	134.91
4	(Japan) Kaori Sakamoto	Team Red	133.26
5	(Japan) Mai Mihara	Team Blue	124.24
6	(Japan) Satoko Miyahara	Team Blue	119.69

=== Overall ===
Rank	Team	Points
1	Team Blue	896.86
2	Team Red	841.12

== 2020 ==
The 2020 competition was held on October 3, 2020 at the Saitama Super Arena.

Due to the COVID-19 pandemic, the competition featured two teams composed of domestic Japanese skaters only, rather than the traditional three teams drawn from their respective regions (Europe, Japan, and North America). Senior, junior, and professional skaters will be included.

=== Men ===
Rank	Name	Team	Points
1	(Japan) Lucas Tsuyoshi Honda	Team Red	137.99
2	(Japan) Sōta Yamamoto	Team Blue	137.97
3	(Japan) Ryuju Hino	Team Red	120.37
4	(Japan) Hiraoki Sato	Team Blue	119.52

=== Ladies ===
Rank	Name	Team	Points
1	(Japan) Mako Yamashita	Team Red	126.94
2	(Japan) Wakaba Higuchi	Team Blue	123.01
3	(Japan) Tomoe Kawabata	Team Red	112.63
4	(Japan) Yuhana Yokoi	Team Blue	109.57
5	(Japan) Hana Yoshida	Team Blue	107.56
6	(Japan) Chisato Uramatsu	Team Red	95.70

=== Overall ===
Rank	Team	Points
1	Team Blue	597.63
2	Team Red	593.63

== 2019 ==
The 2019 competition was held on October 5, 2019 at the Saitama Super Arena.

=== Men ===
Rank	Name	Nation	Points
1	Nathan Chen	United States	189.83
2	Shoma Uno	Japan	169.09
3	Vincent Zhou	United States	167.64
4	Koshiro Shimada	Japan	153.37
5	Javier Fernández	Spain	153.14
6	Deniss Vasiļjevs	Latvia	146.65

=== Ladies ===
Rank	Name	Nation	Points
1	Alexandra Trusova	Russia	160.53
2	Alina Zagitova	Russia	154.41
3	Rika Kihira	Japan	144.76
4	Satoko Miyahara	Japan	134.94
5	Bradie Tennell	United States	124.91
6	Mirai Nagasu	United States	111.04

=== Team result ===
Rank	Name	Total points
1	Team Europe	614.73
2	Team Japan	602.16
3	Team North America	593.42

== 2018 ==
The 2018 competition was held on October 6, 2018 at the Saitama Super Arena.

=== Men ===
Rank	Name	Nation	Points
1	Shoma Uno	Japan	186.69
2	Nobunari Oda	Japan	176.95
3	Javier Fernández	Spain	157.86
4	Nathan Chen	United States	144.96
5	Deniss Vasiļjevs	Latvia	129.32
6	Jeremy Abbott	United States	124.06

=== Ladies ===
Rank	Name	Nation	Points
1	Alina Zagitova	Russia	159.18
2	Kaori Sakamoto	Japan	130.28
3	Satoko Miyahara	Japan	127.99
4	Bradie Tennell	United States	126.86
5	Mariah Bell	United States	120.57
6	Maria Sotskova	Russia	111.78

=== Team result ===
Rank	Name	Total points
1	Team Japan	621.91
2	Team Europe	558.14
3	Team North America	516.45

== 2017 ==
The 2017 competition was held on October 7, 2017 at the Saitama Super Arena.

=== Men ===
Rank	Name	Nation	Points
1	Javier Fernández	Spain	189.47
2	Nathan Chen	United States	178.46
3	Shoma Uno	Japan	175.45
4	Nobunari Oda	Japan	158.24
5	Jeremy Abbott	United States	143.48
6	Alexei Bychenko	Israel	128.52

=== Ladies ===
Rank	Name	Nation	Points
1	Evgenia Medvedeva	Russia	152.08
2	Mai Mihara	Japan	147.83
3	Alina Zagitova	Russia	145.28
4	Mirai Nagasu	United States	134.69
5	Marin Honda	Japan	133.41
6	Karen Chen	United States	116.32

=== Team result ===
Rank	Name	Total points
1	Team Europe	615.35
2	Team Japan	614.93
3	Team North America	572.95

== 2016 ==
The 2016 competition was held on October 1, 2016 at the Saitama Super Arena.

=== Men ===
Rank	Name	Nation	Points
1	Shoma Uno	Japan	198.55
2	Javier Fernandez	Spain	192.20
3	Nobunari Oda	Japan	178.72
4	Jeremy Abbott	United States	166.99
5	Adam Rippon	United States	166.85
6	Florent Amodio	France	124.35

=== Ladies ===
Rank	Name	Nation	Points
1	Evgenia Medvedeva	Russia	147.07
2	Satoko Miyahara	Japan	143.39
3	Ashley Wagner	United States	132.12
4	Anna Pogorilaya	Russia	132.04
5	Wakaba Higuchi	Japan	116.99
6	Gracie Gold	United States	108.24

=== Team result ===
Rank	Name	Total points
1	Team Japan	637.65
2	Team Europe	595.66
3	Team North America	574.20

== 2015 ==
The 2015 competition was held on October 3, 2015 at the Saitama Super Arena.

=== Men ===
Rank	Name	Nation	Points
1	Shoma Uno	Japan	185.48
2	Javier Fernández	Spain	176.24
3	Patrick Chan	Canada	159.14
4	Jeremy Abbott	United States	153.72
5	Daisuke Murakami	Japan	145.77
6	Brian Joubert	France	105.51

=== Ladies ===
Rank	Name	Nation	Points
1	Mao Asada	Japan	141.70
2	Satoko Miyahara	Japan	134.67
3	Elizaveta Tuktamysheva	Russia	128.34
4	Adelina Sotnikova	Russia	118.81
5	Ashley Wagner	United States	117.84
6	Gracie Gold	United States	114.53

=== Team result ===
Rank	Name	Total points
1	Team Japan	607.62
2	Team North America	545.23
3	Team Europe	528.90

== 2014 ==
The 2014 competition was held on October 4, 2014 at the Saitama Super Arena.

=== Men ===
Rank	Name	Nation	Points
1	Patrick Chan	Canada	178.17
2	Javier Fernández	Spain	155.47
3	Takahito Mura	Japan	146.41
4	Tomáš Verner	Czech Republic	137.50
5	Jeffrey Buttle	Canada	136.08
6	Takahiko Kozuka	Japan	119.51

=== Ladies ===
Rank	Name	Nation	Points
1	Elena Radionova	Russia	136.46
2	Satoko Miyahara	Japan	131.94
3	Anna Pogorilaya	Russia	122.52
4	Kanako Murakami	Japan	114.38
5	Mirai Nagasu	United States	106.85
6	Ashley Wagner	United States	100.99

=== Team result ===
Rank	Name	Total points
1	Team Europe	551.95
2	Team North America	522.09
3	Team Japan	512.24

== 2013 ==
The 2013 competition was held on October 5, 2013.

=== Men ===
Rank	Name	Nation	Points
1	Javier Fernández	Spain	176.91
2	Takahiko Kozuka	Japan	158.32
3	Jeremy Abbott	United States	157.70
4	Daisuke Takahashi	Japan	149.12
5	Jeffrey Buttle	Canada	127.43
6	Michal Březina	Czech Republic	125.74

=== Ladies ===
Rank	Name	Nation	Points
1	Mao Asada	Japan	135.16
2	Joannie Rochette	Canada	123.99
3	Ashley Wagner	United States	119.77
4	Adelina Sotnikova	Russia	105.95
5	Kanako Murakami	Japan	102.15
6	Irina Slutskaya	Russia	69.24

=== Team result ===
Rank	Name	Total points
1	Team Japan	544.85
2	Team North America	528.89
3	Team Europe	477.84

== 2012 ==
The 2012 competition was held on October 6, 2012.

=== Men ===
Rank	Name	Nation	Points
1	Daisuke Takahashi	Japan	172.06
2	Takahiko Kozuka	Japan	165.08
3	Jeffrey Buttle	Canada	160.86
4	Evgeni Plushenko	Russia	156.21
5	Michal Březina	Czech Republic	151.53
6	Patrick Chan	Canada	137.42

=== Ladies ===
Rank	Name	Nation	Points
1	Ashley Wagner	United States	123.57
2	Mao Asada	Japan	122.04
3	Akiko Suzuki	Japan	110.07
4	Alena Leonova	Russia	107.94
5	Elene Gedevanishvili	Georgia	94.84
6	Agnes Zawadzki	United States	89.95

=== Team result ===
Rank	Name	Total points
1	Team Japan	569.25
2	Team North America	511.80
3	Team Europe	510.52

== 2011 ==
The 2011 competition was held on October 1, 2011 at the Saitama Super Arena.

=== Men ===
Rank	Name	Nation	Points
1	Patrick Chan	Canada	159.93
2	Artur Gachinski	Russia	152.71
3	Takahiko Kozuka	Japan	148.21
4	Jeffrey Buttle	Canada	138.33
5	Florent Amodio	France	138.25
6	Daisuke Takahashi	Japan	130.79

=== Ladies ===
Elizaveta Tuktamysheva replaced the injured Sarah Meier.

Rank	Name	Nation	Points
1	Elizaveta Tuktamysheva	Russia	118.59
2	Joannie Rochette	Canada	112.74
3	Akiko Suzuki	Japan	112.46
4	Alena Leonova	Russia	108.39
5	Alissa Czisny	United States	107.64
6	Miki Ando	Japan	88.11

=== Team result ===
Rank	Name	Total points
1	Team North America	518.64
2	Team Europe	517.94
3	Team Japan	479.57

== 2010 ==
The 2010 event was held on October 2, 2010 at the Saitama Super Arena.

=== Men ===
Rank	Name	Nation	Points
1	Adam Rippon	United States	166.63
2	Daisuke Takahashi	Japan	159.19
3	Evgeni Plushenko	Russia	151.00
4	Takahiko Kozuka	Japan	150.71
5	Michal Březina	Czech Republic	134.90
6	Jeffrey Buttle	Canada	128.39

=== Ladies ===
Rank	Name	Nation	Points
1	Joannie Rochette	Canada	122.71
2	Miki Ando	Japan	115.02
3	Cynthia Phaneuf	Canada	99.50
4	Sarah Meier	Switzerland	92.73
5	Mao Asada	Japan	92.44
6	Júlia Sebestyén	Hungary	81.48

=== Team result ===
Rank	Name	Total points
1	Team Japan	517.36
2	Team North America	517.23
3	Team Europe	460.11

== 2009 ==
The 2009 event was held on October 3, 2009 at the Saitama Super Arena.

=== Men ===
Rank	Name	Nation	Points
1	Stephane Lambiel	Switzerland	150.52
2	Jeffrey Buttle	Canada	142.26
3	Jeremy Abbott	United States	132.87
4	Takahiko Kozuka	Japan	130.13
5	Samuel Contesti	Italy	117.49
6	Takeshi Honda	Japan	109.58

=== Ladies ===
Rank	Name	Nation	Points
1	Joannie Rochette	Canada	126.39
2	Laura Lepistö	Finland	110.86
3	Mao Asada	Japan	102.94
4	Yukari Nakano	Japan	91.52
5	Jelena Glebova	Estonia	85.16
6	Beatrisa Liang	United States	62.38

=== Team result ===
Rank	Name	Total points
1	Team Europe	464.03
2	Team North America	463.90
3	Team Japan	434.17

== 2008 ==
The 2008 event was held on April 20, 2008 at the Saitama Super Arena.

=== Men ===
Rank	Name	Nation	Points
1	Evan Lysacek	United States	151.95
2	Stephane Lambiel	Switzerland	146.49
3	Adrian Schultheiss	Sweden	132.90
4	Daisuke Takahashi	Japan	127.23
5	Takeshi Honda	Japan	114.70
6	Todd Eldredge	United States	111.94

=== Ladies ===
Rank	Name	Nation	Points
1	Mao Asada	Japan	128.03
2	Sarah Meier	Switzerland	123.11
3	Yukari Nakano	Japan	121.86
4	Kimmie Meissner	United States	109.50
5	Mirai Nagasu	United States	108.42
6	Kiira Korpi	Finland	85.95

=== Team result ===
Rank	Name	Total points
1	Team Japan	491.82
2	Team Europe	488.45
3	Team North America	481.81

== 2007 ==
The 2007 event was held on April 29, 2007 at the Saitama Super Arena.

=== Men ===
Rank	Name	Nation	Points
1	Nobunari Oda	Japan	150.59
2	Jeffrey Buttle	Canada	140.73
3	Brian Joubert	France	132.76
4	Takahiko Kozuka	Japan	132.76
5	Alexei Yagudin	Russia	128.43
6	Todd Eldredge	United States	117.52

=== Ladies ===
Rank	Name	Nation	Points
1	Miki Ando	Japan	112.65
2	Sarah Meier	Switzerland	111.29
3	Joannie Rochette	Canada	107.78
4	Mao Asada	Japan	101.47
5	Kiira Korpi	Finland	98.63
6	Kimmie Meissner	United States	92.78

=== Team result ===
Rank	Name	Total points
1	Team Japan	497.47
2	Team Europe	471.11
3	Team North America	458.81

== 2006 ==
The 2006 event was held on March 14, 2006 at the Saitama Super Arena.

=== Men ===
Rank	Name	Nation	Points
1	Stephane Lambiel	Switzerland	141.80
2	Daisuke Takahashi	Japan	141.10
3	Jeffrey Buttle	Canada	139.40
4	Emanuel Sandhu	Canada	130.90
5	Takeshi Honda	Japan	119.70
6	Alexei Yagudin	Russia	112.70

=== Ladies ===
Rank	Name	Nation	Points
1	Mao Asada	Japan	125.72
2	Joannie Rochette	Canada	117.64
3	Sarah Meier	Switzerland	104.56
4	Miki Ando	Japan	104.56
5	Kiira Korpi	Finland	86.66
6	Alissa Czisny	United States	85.40

=== Team result ===
Rank	Name	Total points
1	Team Japan	491.08
2	Team North America	473.34
3	Team Europe	445.72
