= Machiko Yamada =

Japanese figure skater and figure skating coach

Machiko Kinoshita Yamada
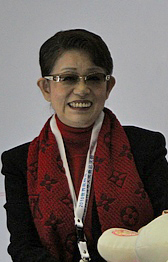

Personal information
- Native name: 山田満知子
- Born: June 26, 1943 (age 83) Nagoya, Aichi Prefecture, Japan

Figure skating career
- Country: Japan

Machiko Yamada

Japanese name
- Kanji: 山田満知子
- Hiragana: やまだ まちこ
Transcriptions
- Romanization: Machiko Yamada

Machiko Kinoshita Yamada (山田 満知子, Yamada Machiko; born June 26, 1943) is a figure skating coach and former Japanese competitive figure skater.

== Biography ==
Yamada was born on June 26, 1943, in Nagoya, Aichi Prefecture, Japan.

She began figure skating at the age of seven. Yamada won several domestic competitions during her time as a figure skater. She also competed in pairs with Takatsugu Hashiguchi and the pair won the Japanese National silver medal.

Following her retirement from competitive figure skating, Yamada became a figure skating coach as well as married and had a daughter.

Her alma mater is Kinjo Gakuin University.

Long-time pupil, Midori Ito, lived with Yamada following her parents' divorce as a child and stayed with her for the duration of her competitive figure skating career.

== Coaching career ==
Yamada currently coaches at the Grand Prix Tokai Figure Skating Club in Nagoya.

Her current students include:

- Rino Matsuike
- Kaoruko Wada
- Sōta Yamamoto
- Mako Yamashita

Her former students have included:

- Mai Asada
- Mao Asada
- Mihoko Higuchi
- Midori Ito
- Kumiko Koiwai
- Kanako Murakami
- Yukari Nakano
- Yoshie Onda
- Shoma Uno
- Emi Watanabe

== Competitive highlights ==
=== Pairs with Hashiguchi ===
National
Event	1960–61
Japan	2nd
