= Mako Yamashita =

Japanese figure skater

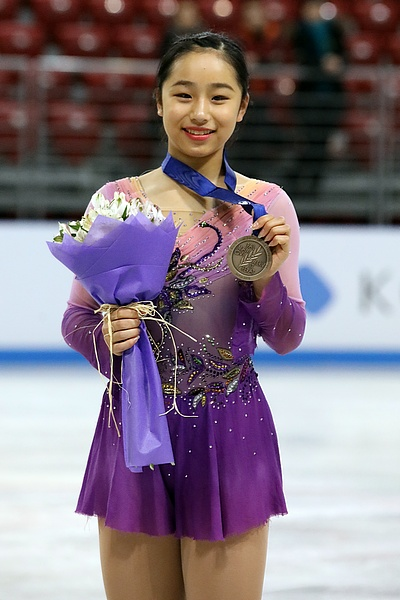
- Yamashita at the 2018 Junior Worlds

Personal information
- Native name: 山下 真瑚
- Born: December 31, 2002 (age 23) Nagoya, Japan
- Home town: Nagoya, Japan
- Height: 1.51 m (4 ft 11 1/2 in)

Figure skating career
- Country: Japan
- Coach: Machiko Yamada; Yuko Hongo; Soshi Tanaka
- Skating club: Chukyo University
- Began skating: 2009
World Junior Championships
Bronze medal – third place	2018 Sofia	Singles

Mako Yamashita (Japanese: 山下 真瑚; born December 31, 2002) is a Japanese figure skater. She is the 2018 Skate Canada silver medalist and a two-time medalist at the ISU Challenger Series. On the junior level, she is the 2018 World Junior bronze medalist, a four-time medalist on the ISU Junior Grand Prix series, and the 2017–18 Japanese junior national silver medalist.

== Personal life ==
Mako Yamashita was born on 31 December 2002 in Nagoya, Japan.

She currently studies at Chukyo University's School of Sports Science.

== Career ==
=== Early career ===
Yamashita began learning how to skate in 2009 at the age of seven. That same year, she joined the Grand Prix Tokai Club, where Machiko Yamada became her coach.

On the novice level, she won the bronze medal at the 2013–14 Japan Novice B Championships and silver at the 2015–16 Japan Novice A Championships.

=== 2016–2017 season ===
Making her junior international debut on the ISU Junior Grand Prix series, Yamashita won the bronze medal at the 2016 JGP Japan and 2016 JGP Estonia.

She subsequently finished sixteenth at the 2016–17 Japan Junior Championships.

=== 2017–2018 season: World Junior bronze medal ===
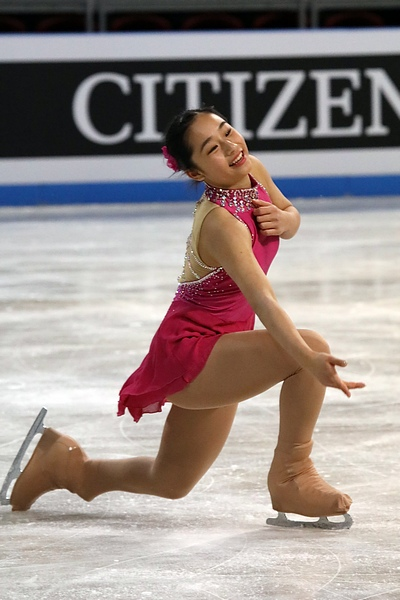
Yamashita at the 2018 World Junior Championships

Yamashita started the season by finishing fourth on the junior level at the 2017 Asian Open Trophy. In September, she won the bronze medal at 2017 JGP Austria behind Anastasia Tarakanova and Lim Eun-soo. Yamashita then won the silver medal at her next JGP event, 2017 JGP Croatia, behind Sofia Samodurova.

She subsequently won the silver medal at the 2017–18 Japan Junior Championships and placed tenth at the 2017–18 Japan Championships. In March, Yamashita won the bronze medal at the 2018 World Junior Figure Skating Championships.

=== 2018–2019 season: Senior debut ===
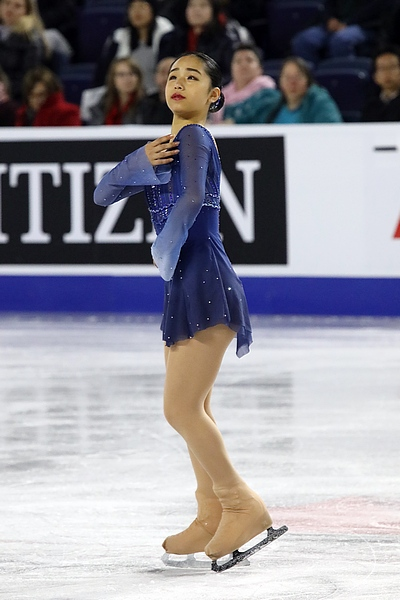
Yamashita performing at 2018 Skate Canada International

In August 2018, Yamashita made her senior international debut, winning the bronze medal at the 2018 CS Asian Trophy, behind Lim Eun-soo and Yuna Shiraiwa. In September, she also won the bronze medal at the 2018 CS Lombardia Trophy, behind Elizaveta Tuktamysheva and Sofia Samodurova.

In October, Yamashita debuted on the ISU Grand Prix series in the 2018–19 season. She won the silver medal at 2018 Skate Canada behind Elizaveta Tuktamysheva and ahead of Evgenia Medvedeva, the 2018 Olympic silver medalist. She then competed at 2018 Rostelecom Cup, where she placed seventh.

Yamashita finished the season by placing sixth at the 2018–19 Japan Championships.

Yamashita competing at the 2019 Skate America

=== 2019–2020 season ===
Yamashita began the season with a sixth place at the 2019 CS Ondrej Nepela Memorial. She finished twelfth out of twelve skaters at the 2019 Skate America. Yamashita fared better at the 2019 NHK Trophy, where she placed fifth.

At the 2019–20 Japanese Championships, Yamashita was fifth in the short program but dropped to eleventh place overall after finishing sixteenth in the free skate.

=== 2020–2021 season ===
Yamashita was invited to be a part of Team Red at the Japan Open after the withdrawal of Marin Honda. Competing domestically, she placed sixth at Western Sectionals.

With the COVID-19 pandemic prompting the ISU to assign the Grand Prix based primarily on geographic location to limit international travel, Yamashita was assigned to compete at the 2020 NHK Trophy as part of a field of Japanese skaters and South Korea's You Young. She placed third in the short program. In the free skate, Yamashita attempted a quad Salchow in international competition for the first time, landing it with a full downgrade, as well as making errors on two other jumps. She dropped to fifth place overall.

Yamashita placed thirteenth at the 2020–21 Japan Championships.

=== 2021–2022 season ===
For a second consecutive year, Yamashita placed thirteenth at the 2021–22 Japan Championships.

=== 2022–2023 season ===
Competing at the 2022–23 Japan Championships, Yamashita placed sixteenth.

=== 2023–2024 season ===
At the 2023–24 Japan Championships, Yamashita unexpectedly placed second in the short program, albeit nearly nine points behind segment leader Kaori Sakamoto. She dropped to eighth overall after the free skate, but said that she felt her stamina in that segment was improving. She closed the season with a bronze medal at the 2024 Tallink Hotels Cup.

=== 2024–2025 season ===
Yamashita started the season with a silver medal win at the 2024 Asian Open Trophy. She subsequently went on to compete at the 2024–25 Japan Championships, where she finished in sixth place. Yamashita then closed off the season in February by winning bronze at the 2025 International Challenge Cup.

=== 2025–2026 season ===
Yamashita opened her season with a sixth-place finish at the 2025 CS Kinoshita Group Cup. She then went on to finish fifteenth at the 2025–26 Japan Championships.

=== 2026–27 season ===
In November, Yamashita returned to the Grand Prix circuit, placing sixth at 2026 Cup of China. “I feel really happy to have the opportunity to skate on such a big stage,” she said. “The audience gave me such warm support, and I’d love to come back again. At the NHK Trophy, I want to deliver a higher-quality short program and redeem myself in the free skate.”

== Programs ==
Season	Short program	Free skating	Exhibition
2026–2027	Bring Me to Life by Evanescence choreo. by Noriko Sato	La Vie en rose by Édith Piaf & Louiguy performed by Patricia Kaas choreo. by Akiko Suzuki; Boléro by Maurice Ravel performed by Radio Symphony Orchestra & Anton Lubleck choreo. by Akiko Suzuki	
2025–2026	The Lark Ascending by Ralph Vaughan Williams performed by Jack Liebeck, VOCES8, & Paul Drayton choreo. by Kenji Miyamoto	La Vie en rose by Édith Piaf & Louiguy performed by Patricia Kaas choreo. by Akiko Suzuki	Rise Up by Andra Day choreo. by Machiko Yamada, Mako Yamashita, & Yuko Hongo
2024–2025	She's Like the Swallow by Cara Dillon performed by Leigh Nash & Lucia Micarelli choreo. by Akiko Suzuki; Hindi Sad Diamonds (from Moulin Rouge!) by Alka Yagnik, John Leguizamo, Nicole Kidman, Sameer, Leo Robin, Jule Styne, & Steve Sharples choreo. by Misao Sato	Creep by Radiohead performed by Mónica Naranjo choreo. by Akiko Suzuki	
2023–2024	She's Like the Swallow by Cara Dillon performed by Leigh Nash & Lucia Micarelli choreo. by Akiko Suzuki	Baragaki: Unbroken Samurai; Habanera of the Deadly Fight; Assassination Banquet; Scarlet Robe; Battle of Toba-Fushimi by Reiko Tsuchiya choreo. by Kenji Miyamoto	
2022–2023	Rise Up by Andra Day choreo. by Machiko Yamada, Mako Yamashita, & Yuko Hongo	Sunset Boulevard; Car Chase by Andrew Lloyd Webber; As If We Never Said Goodbye performed by Glenn Close choreo. by Akiko Suzuki	
2021–2022	Angel performed by Katherine Jenkins choreo. by Mihoko Higuchi	Memoirs of a Geisha; The Chairman's Waltz; Becoming a Geisha by John Williams choreo. by Mihoko Higuchi	
2020–2021	Una voce poco fa by Gioachino Rossini choreo. by Mihoko Higuchi & Machiko Yamada	A Thousand Years by Christina Perri choreo. by Mihoko Higuchi, Machiko Yamada	Over the Rainbow performed by Grace VanderWaal
2019–2020	Una voce poco fa by Gioachino Rossini choreo. by Mihoko Higuchi & Machiko Yamada	Scent of a Woman by Thomas Newman choreo. by Mihoko Higuchi & Machiko Yamada	Over the Rainbow performed by Grace VanderWaal
2018–2019	Una voce poco fa by Gioachino Rossini choreo. by Mihoko Higuchi & Machiko Yamada	Madama Butterfly by Giacomo Puccini choreo. by Mihoko Higuchi	Over the Rainbow performed by Grace VanderWaal; Nocturne by Secret Garden
2017–2018	Bohemian Rhapsody performed by Maksim Mrvica choreo. by Mihoko Higuchi	Madama Butterfly by Giacomo Puccini choreo. by Mihoko Higuchi	Nocturne by Secret Garden
2016–2017	Nocturne by Secret Garden	Bohemian Rhapsody performed by Maksim Mrvica	
2015–2016	Leyenda by Vanessa-Mae	Nocturne by Secret Garden	Leyenda by Vanessa-Mae

== Competitive highlights ==
- GP – Event of the ISU Grand Prix Series
- JGP – Event of the ISU Junior Grand Prix Series
- CS – Event of the ISU Challenger Series
- TBD – Assigned
- Medals at team events are awarded for the team results only. Individual placements at team events are listed in parentheses.

Competition placements at senior level
Season	2017–18	2018–19	2019–20	2020–21	2021–22	2022–23	2023–24	2024–25	2025–26	2026–27
Japan Championships	10th	6th	11th	13th	13th	16th	8th	6th	15th	
GP Cup of China										7th
GP NHK Trophy			5th	5th						
GP Rostelecom Cup		7th								
GP Skate America			12th							
GP Skate Canada		2nd								
CS Asian Open Trophy		3rd								
CS Kinoshita Group Cup									6th	
CS Lombardia Trophy		3rd								
CS Nepela Memorial			6th							
Asian Open Trophy								2nd		
Challenge Cup								3rd		
Japan Open				2nd (1st)						
Tallink Hotels Cup							3rd			

Yamashita alongside Elizaveta Tuktamysheva (middle) and Evgenia Medvedeva (right) at the 2018 Skate Canada

Competition placements at junior level
Season	2015–16	2016–17	2017–18
World Junior Championships			3rd
Japan Championships	9th	16th	2nd
JGP Austria			3rd
JGP Croatia			2nd
JGP Estonia		3rd	
JGP Japan		3rd	
Asian Open Trophy			4th

== Detailed results ==
ISU personal best scores in the +5/-5 GOE System
Segment	Type	Score	Event
Total	TSS	203.06	2018 Skate Canada
Short program	TSS	69.17	2026 Cup of China
Short program	TES	39.10	2026 Cup of China
Short program	PCS	30.89	2018 Skate Canada
Free skating	TSS	136.76	2018 Skate Canada
Free skating	TES	71.67	2018 Skate Canada
Free skating	PCS	65.09	2018 Skate Canada

ISU personal best scores in the +3/-3 GOE System
Segment	Type	Score	Event
Total	TSS	195.17	2018 World Junior Championships
Short program	TSS	66.79	2018 World Junior Championships
Short program	TES	38.59	2018 World Junior Championships
Short program	PCS	28.20	2018 World Junior Championships
Free skating	TSS	128.38	2018 World Junior Championships
Free skating	TES	70.27	2018 World Junior Championships
Free skating	PCS	58.11	2018 World Junior Championships

=== Senior level ===
Results in the 2026–27 season
Date	Event	SP		FS		Total	
Date	Event	P	Score	P	Score	P	Score
Nov 6–8, 2026	2026 Cup of China	5	69.17	7	124.15	7	193.32

Results in the 2025–26 season
Date	Event	SP		FS		Total	
Date	Event	P	Score	P	Score	P	Score
Sep 5–7, 2025	(Japan) 2025 CS Kinoshita Group Cup	12	52.50	4	131.41	6	183.81
Dec 18–21, 2025	2025–26 Japan Championships	11	63.43	16	119.75	15	183.18

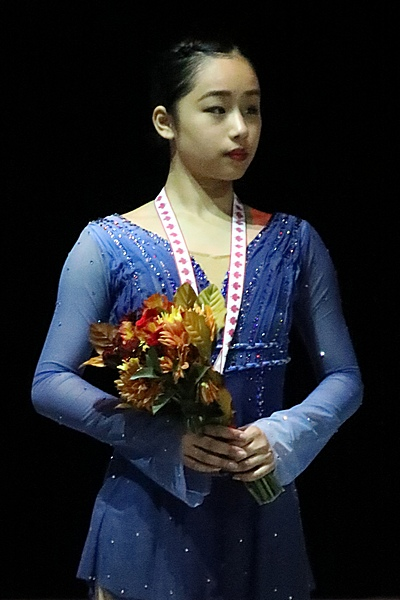
Yamashita on the podium at 2018 Skate Canada International

2024–25 season
Date	Event	SP	FS	Total
February 13–16, 2025	2025 Challenge Cup	3; 68.78	3; 129.68	3; 198.46
December 19–22, 2024	2024–25 Japan Championships	12; 65.13	4; 135.12	6; 200.25
September 5–6, 2024	2024 Asian Open Trophy	5; 54.69	1; 131.44	2; 186.13
2023–24 season
Date	Event	SP	FS	Total
February 15–18, 2024	2024 Tallink Hotels Cup	1; 69.85	3; 109.54	3; 179.39
December 20–24, 2023	2023–24 Japan Championships	2; 69.92	12; 122.23	8; 192.15
2022–23 season
Date	Event	SP	FS	Total
December 21–25, 2022	2022–23 Japan Championships	22; 54.98	15; 117.98	16; 172.96
2021–22 season
Date	Event	SP	FS	Total
December 22–26, 2021	2021–22 Japan Championships	12; 61.84	13; 117.77	13; 179.61
2020–21 season
Date	Event	SP	FS	Total
December 24–27, 2020	2020–21 Japan Championships	4; 67.28	13; 118.28	13; 185.56
November 27–29, 2020	2020 NHK Trophy	3; 67.56	7; 118.57	5; 186.13
October 3, 2020	2021 Japan Open	–	1; 126.94	2T/1P; 126.94
2019–20 season
Date	Event	SP	FS	Total
December 18–22, 2019	2019–20 Japan Championships	5; 66.64	16; 104.11	11; 170.75
November 22–24, 2019	2019 NHK Trophy	5; 65.70	5; 123.55	5; 189.25
October 18–20, 2019	2019 Skate America	12; 46.21	11; 96.19	12; 142.40
September 19–21, 2019	2019 CS Nepela Memorial	7; 55.99	6; 107.55	6; 163.54
2018–19 season
Date	Event	SP	FS	Total
December 20–24, 2018	2018–19 Japan Championships	9; 62.94	5; 134.20	6; 197.14
November 16–18, 2018	2018 Rostelecom Cup	9; 51.00	7; 110.22	7; 161.22
October 26–28, 2018	2018 Skate Canada International	3; 66.30	2; 136.76	2; 203.06
September 12–16, 2018	2018 CS Lombardia Trophy	5; 55.33	3; 126.89	3; 182.22
August 1–5, 2018	2018 CS Asian Open Trophy	6; 50.97	3; 112.48	3; 163.45
2017–18 season
Date	Event	SP	FS	Total
December 21–24, 2017	2017–18 Japan Championships	15; 57.80	10; 125.54	10; 183.34

=== Junior level ===
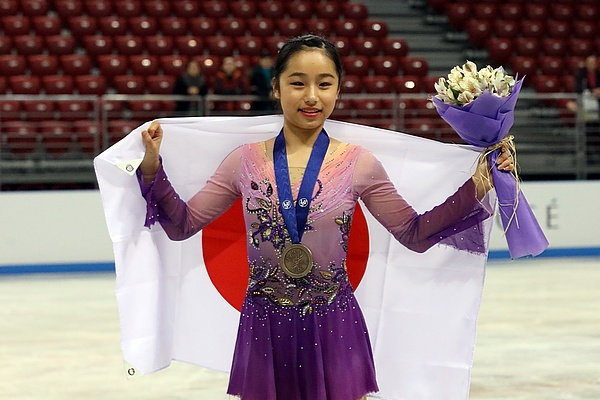
Yamashita at the 2018 World Junior Championships podium

Small medals for short and free programs awarded only at ISU Championships.

2017–18 season
Date	Event	SP	FS	Total
March 5–11, 2018	2018 World Junior Championships	3; 66.79	3; 128.38	3; 195.17
November 24–26, 2017	2017–18 Japan Junior Championships	1; 65.13	2; 124.90	2; 190.03
September 27–30, 2017	2017 JGP Croatia	2; 65.22	2; 110.53	2; 175.75
August 31–September 2, 2017	2017 JGP Austria	3; 64.49	3; 116.55	3; 181.04
August 2–5, 2017	2017 Asian Open Trophy	4; 54.45	4; 114.35	4; 168.80
2016–17 season
Date	Event	SP	FS	Total
November 18–20, 2016	2016–17 Japan Junior Championships	22; 42.28	12; 97.53	16; 139.81
September 28–October 2, 2016	2016 JGP Estonia	2; 62.65	3; 121.41	3; 184.06
September 7–11, 2016	2016 JGP Japan	2; 64.86	4; 117.57	3; 182.43
2015–16 season
Date	Event	SP	FS	Total
November 21–23, 2015	2015–16 Japan Junior Championships	12; 51.40	9; 107.81	9; 159.21
