= Kanako Murakami =

Japanese figure skater

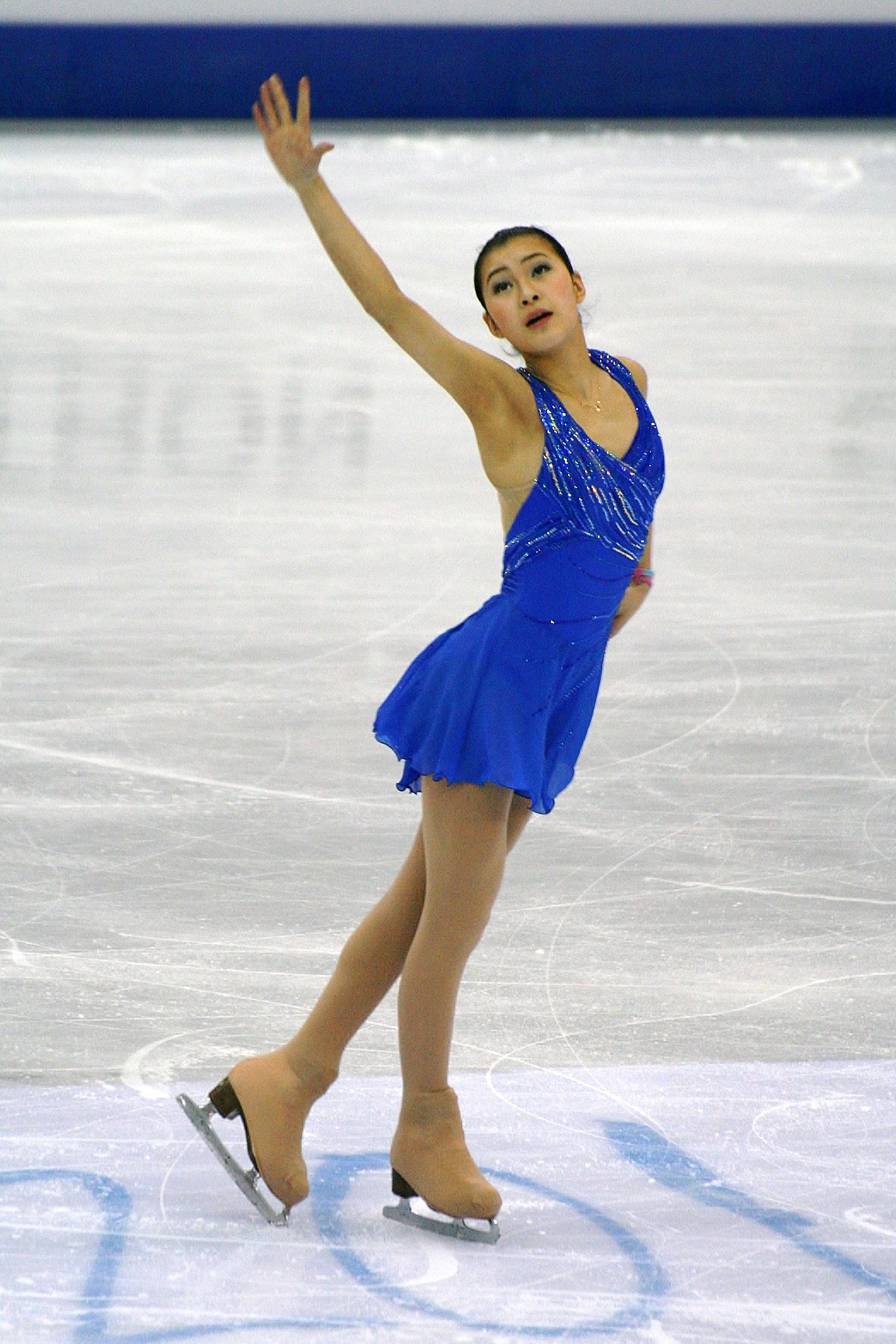
- Murakami at the 2012 World Championships

Personal information
- Born: November 7, 1994 (age 32) Naka-ku, Nagoya
- Height: 1.62 m (5 ft 4 in)

Figure skating career
- Country: Japan
- Coach: Machiko Yamada, Mihoko Higuchi
- Skating club: Chukyo University
- Began skating: 1999
- Retired: April 23, 2017
Event	Gold medal – first place	Silver medal – second place	Bronze medal – third place
Four Continents Championships	1	0	1
Grand Prix Final	0	0	1
Japan Championships	0	2	2
World Team Trophy	1	0	1
World Junior Championships	1	0	0
Junior Grand Prix Final	1	0	0
Medal list
Four Continents Championships
Gold medal – first place	2014 Taipei	Singles
Bronze medal – third place	2013 Osaka	Singles
Grand Prix Final
Bronze medal – third place	2010–11 Beijing	Singles
Japan Championships
Silver medal – second place	2012–13 Sapporo	Singles
Silver medal – second place	2013–14 Saitama	Singles
Bronze medal – third place	2010–11 Nagano	Singles
Bronze medal – third place	2011–12 Osaka	Singles
World Team Trophy
Gold medal – first place	2012 Tokyo	Team
Bronze medal – third place	2015 Tokyo	Team
World Junior Championships
Gold medal – first place	2010 The Hague	Singles
Junior Grand Prix Final
Gold medal – first place	2009–10 Tokyo	Singles

Kanako Murakami

Japanese name
- Kanji: 村上 佳菜子
- Kana: むらかみ かなこ
Transcriptions
- Romanization: Murakami Kanako

Kanako Murakami (村上 佳菜子, Murakami Kanako; born November 7, 1994) is a retired Japanese figure skater. She is the 2010–11 Grand Prix Final bronze medalist, 2014 Four Continents champion, 2010 World Junior champion, 2009–10 JGP Final champion, and a four-time Japanese national medalist (bronze in 2010, 2011; silver in 2012, 2013).

== Personal life ==
Murakami was born on November 7, 1994, in Naka-ku, Nagoya.

In September 2024, Murakami married her boyfriend, Yutaka, in a ceremony held at Miyako Island.

== Career ==
=== Early career ===
Making her first international appearance, Murakami won the silver medal in the spring girls category at the Mladost Trophy in the 2004–05 season.

In the 2005–06 season, she won silver at the 2005–06 Japan Novice Championships in the Novice B category, which is the lower of the novice levels. This medal earned her a trip to compete in the spring competition, the Gardena Spring Trophy, which she won on the novice level. Murakami competed at the 2006–07 Japan Novice Championships in the Novice A category and placed 7th, and at the 2007–08 Japan Novice Championships in the Novice A category, she placed 5th.

=== 2008–09 season: Junior international debut ===
Murakami debuted on the ISU Junior Grand Prix. She won the bronze medal at her first event in Madrid, Spain. At her second event, in Sheffield, England, she won the competition. She was the 4th qualifier for the 2008–09 ISU Junior Grand Prix Final.

Prior to the JGP Final, Murakami competed at the 2008–09 Japan Junior Championships, which served both as the junior national championships and the qualifier for the Japanese team to the World Junior Championships. Murakami placed 7th in the short program and won the free skating to take the bronze medal, which earned her an invitation to compete at the 2008–09 senior national championships. However, as Japan had earned only two berths to the 2009 World Junior Championships, Murakami did not qualify.

At the JGP Final, she placed 2nd in the short program and 3rd in the free skating to place 4th overall. Following the Final, Murakami competed at the 2008–09 Japan Championships, where she placed 7th in the short program, 8th in the free skating, and 7th overall.

=== 2009–10 season: JGP Final and World Junior title ===
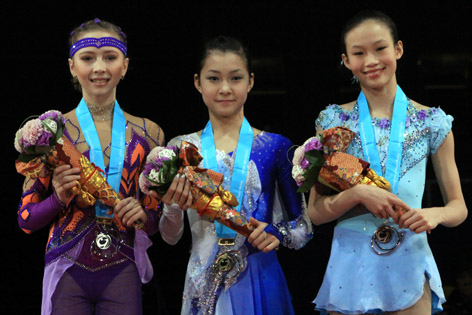
Murakami at the 2009–10 Junior Grand Prix Final podium

In the 2009–10 season, Murakami competed on the 2009–10 ISU Junior Grand Prix and won both her events to qualify for the 2009–10 Junior Grand Prix Final. And she won a gold medal at the JGP Final.

At the 2009–10 Japan Junior Championships, she won both segments of the competition to win the title overall. The win qualified her for the 2009–10 Japan Championship, where she placed fifth overall, behind Mao Asada, Akiko Suzuki, Yukari Nakano, and Miki Ando.

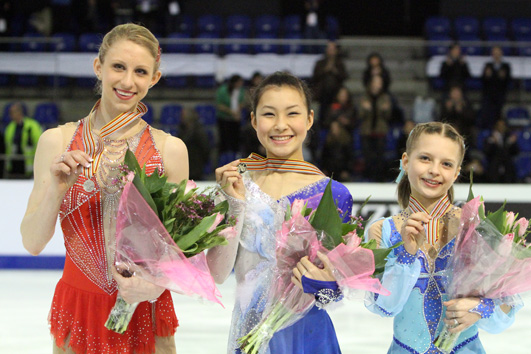
Murakami at the 2010 World Junior Championships podium

She was assigned to compete at the 2010 World Junior Championships, where she won the title after placing second in the short program and first in the free skating.

=== 2010–11 season: Senior debut ===
Murakami moved up to the senior ISU Grand Prix for the 2010–11 season. Her assignments for the 2010–11 ISU Grand Prix season were the 2010 NHK Trophy and the 2010 Skate America.

At the 2010 NHK Trophy, she placed second in the short program behind Carolina Kostner, and fifth in the free skating to capture the bronze medal. During both programs, she landed a triple toe-triple toe combination cleanly. At the 2010 Skate America, she placed second in the short program after singling her double Axel. She placed second in the free skate behind Rachael Flatt and won the gold medal.

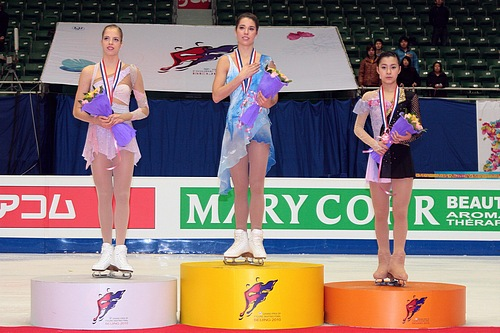
Murakami (right) with Alissa Czisny (center) and Carolina Kostner (left) at the 2010–11 Grand Prix Final podium

Murakami qualified for the 2010–11 Grand Prix Final. She placed third in the short program and second in the free skate on her way to the bronze medal.

=== 2011–12 season ===
In the 2011–12 Grand Prix season, Murakami finished sixth overall at the 2011 Cup of China and fourth at the 2011 Trophée Éric Bompard. She earned her second consecutive bronze medal at the 2011 Japan Championships.

Murakami placed fourth at the 2012 Four Continents Championships and fifth at the 2012 World Championships.

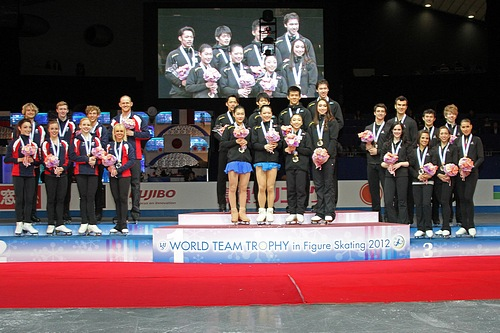
Team Japan (center) at the 2012 ISU World Team Trophy podium

She was part of the ladies' team representing Japan at the 2012 ISU World Team Trophy. She placed 3rd in the short program but 8th in the free skating and finished 6th overall.

=== 2012–13 season ===
Murakami started her season with bronze at the 2012 Skate Canada International and finished 4th at her next event, the 2012 Cup of Russia. She placed second at the 2012–13 Japan Championships.

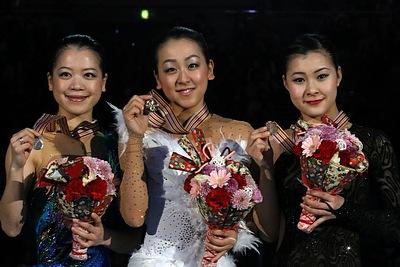
Murakami (right) with Mao Asada (center) and Akiko Suzuki (left) at the 2013 Four Continents Championships podium

She won the bronze medal in her third appearance at the 2013 Four Continents Championships with fellow Japanese medalists Mao Asada and Akiko Suzuki taking the gold and silver medal respectively.

Murakami finished 4th at the 2013 World Championships setting a personal best score of 189.73 points.

=== 2013–14 season: Four Continents champion ===
Murakami finished 4th at her first Grand Prix event of the season, the 2013 Cup of China, and then 7th at the 2013 Rostelecom Cup. At 2013–14 Japan Championships, she finished second behind Akiko Suzuki. After the event, she began wearing new boots which caused swelling in her right ankle.

Murakami won the 2014 Four Continents Championships setting a new personal best overall score of 196.91 points, as well as a personal best in the free skating with 132.18 points. At her Olympic debut in Sochi, Russia, Murakami placed 15th in the short program, 12th in the free skating, and placed 12th overall. She finished 10th at the 2014 World Championships.

=== 2014–15 season ===
Murakami started off her season by competing at Japan Open, where she placed 4th in the ladies' event and Team Japan finished 3rd overall. She then won a medal on the Grand Prix series, taking bronze at the 2014 Cup of China after placing third in both segments. At the 2014 NHK Trophy, she finished 4th after placing 3rd in the short program and 7th in the free skating. With those results, she was the third alternate for the 2014-15 Grand Prix Final.

At the 2014–15 Japan Championships, Murakami placed 9th in the short program, 4th in the free skate, and fourth overall. She was selected to compete at the 2015 World Championships due to her placements in her Grand Prix events. At Worlds, she placed 4th in the short program, 8th in the free skate and 7th overall, earning season's best scores in all segments.

Murakami then competed at 2015 World Team Trophy where she finished 6th and Team Japan placed third overall. After twisting her ankle during an ice show in late April 2015, she cancelled the rest of her post-season skating appearances.

=== 2015–16 season ===
Murakami resumed regular training in September 2015. She began her season on the Challenger Series, placing 7th at the U.S. Classic. Her Grand Prix assignments were the 2015 Skate Canada International and 2015 Trophée Éric Bompard. She finished fourth at both events. In France, the second day of competition was cancelled due to the Paris attacks and the short program standings were deemed the final results.

Murakami placed 6th at the Japanese Championships and 7th at the 2016 Four Continents.

=== 2016–17 season ===
Murakami performed an exhibition program as a special guest at the 2017 World Team Trophy and announced her retirement.

== Endorsements and public life ==
Murakami is sponsored by Adidas Japan, All Nippon Airways (ANA), Nichirei, Brother Industries, Otsuka Pharmaceutical Co., and Nippon Menard Cosmetic Co., Ltd, in addition to several local companies.

Following her win at the 2010 World Junior Championships, Murakami has taken part in many local events including the first pitch ceremony of Chunichi Dragons, a professional baseball team based in Nagoya.

== Programs ==
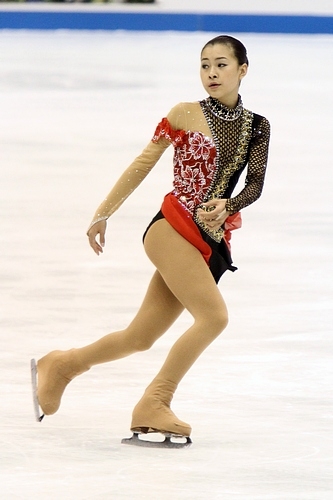
Murakami performs her free skating to The Mask of Zorro in the 2010 NHK Trophy.

Season	Short program	Free skating	Exhibition
2016–17	Danse Boheme (from Carmen) by Georges Bizet choreo. by Mihoko Higuchi	E lucevan le stelle (from Tosca) by Giacomo Puccini choreo. by Mihoko Higuchi	Prayer for Taylor by Michael W. Smith; Seven Nation Army performed by Haley Reinhart and Postmodern Jukebox
2015–16	El Tango de Roxanne (from Moulin Rouge!) by Craig Armstrong performed by Ewan McGregor, José Feliciano, Jacek Koman choreo. by Mihoko Higuchi	SAYURI (from Memoirs of a Geisha) by John Williams choreo. by Mihoko Higuchi	Time to Say Goodbye by Andrea Bocelli and Sarah Brightman
2014–15	Think of Me (from Phantom of the Opera) by Andrew Lloyd Webber choreo. by Mihoko Higuchi	Phantom of the Opera by Andrew Lloyd Webber choreo. by Mihoko Higuchi	Néctar Flamenco by Eduardo Niebla; Frente a Frente by Lucía Méndez
2013–14	Chaconne (from Violin Partita No. 2) by Johann Sebastian Bach arranged by Ikuko Kawai choreo. by Tatiana Tarasova; Catgroove; Libella Swing by Parov Stelar; Swing Bop choreo. by Mihoko Higuchi	Papa, Can You Hear Me? (from Yentl) composed by Michel Legrand choreo. by Pasquale Camerlengo	King of Anything by Sara Bareilles; The Mask of Zorro by James Horner
2012–13	Prayer for Taylor by Michael W. Smith choreo. by Marina Zueva	Oblivion; A fuego lento; Adios Nonino by Astor Piazzolla choreo. by Pasquale Camerlengo	Someone like You; Rolling in the Deep by Adele
2011–12	Chaconne (from Violin Partita No. 2) by Johann Sebastian Bach arranged by Ikuko Kawai choreo. by Tatiana Tarasova	Violin Concerto in E minor, Op. 64 by Felix Mendelssohn choreo. by Marina Zueva	Amarti Si by Filippa Giordano
2010–11	Jumpin' Jack by Big Bad Voodoo Daddy	The Mask of Zorro by James Horner	Be Italian (from Nine) performed by Fergie
2009–10	Néctar Flamenco by Eduardo Niebla; Frente a Frente by Lucía Méndez	Swan Lake by Pyotr Ilyich Tchaikovsky	(The Legend of) Miss Baltimore Crabs (from Hairspray) performed by Michelle Pfeiffer
2008–09	Limelight; Modern Times by Charlie Chaplin	Diablo Rojo by Rodrigo y Gabriela; Selections by Jose Luis Encinas; Vamos A Bailar by Gipsy Kings	Baby Face by Brenda Lee

== Competitive highlights ==
- GP: Grand Prix; CS: Challenger Series; JGP: Junior Grand Prix

International
Event	03–04	04–05	05–06	06–07	07–08	08–09	09–10	10–11	11–12	12–13	13–14	14–15	15–16	16–17
Olympics											12th			
Worlds								8th	5th	4th	10th	7th		
Four Continents									4th	3rd	1st		7th	
GP Final								3rd						
GP Bompard									4th				4th	
GP Cup of China									6th		4th	3rd		
GP NHK Trophy								3rd				4th		
GP Rostelecom										4th	7th			11th
GP Skate America								1st						10th
GP Skate Canada										3rd			4th	
CS Lombardia														6th
CS U.S. Classic													7th	
Asian Games								1st						
Ice Challenge							1st							
International: Junior
Junior Worlds							1st							
JGP Final						4th	1st							
JGP Croatia							1st							
JGP Poland							1st							
JGP Spain						3rd								
JGP U.K.						1st								
Challenge Cup						1st								
International: Novice
Gardena Spring Trophy			1st											
Mladost Trophy		2nd Sp												
National
Japan Champ.						7th	5th	3rd	3rd	2nd	2nd	5th	6th	8th
Japan Junior						3rd	1st							
Japan Novice	10th B	4th B	2nd B	7th A	5th A									
Team events
World Team; Trophy									1st T 6th P			3rd T 6th P		
Japan Open											1st T 5th P	3rd T 4th P		
A: Novice A; B: Novice B; Sp: Spring girls; TBD: Assigned; WD: Withdrew; T: Team result, P: Personal result. Medals awarded for team result only.

== Detailed results ==
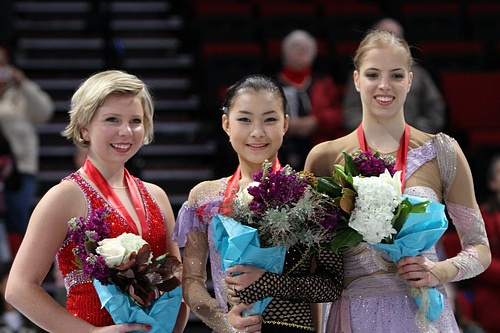
Murakami's gold medal at the 2010 Skate America

Small medals for short program and free skating awarded only at ISU Championships.

=== Senior results ===
2016–17 season
Date	Event	SP	FS	Total
December 22–25, 2016	2016–17 Japan Championships	12; 58.52	7; 124.03	8; 182.55
November 4–6, 2016	2016 Rostelecom Cup	10; 55.25	11; 95.78	11; 151.03
October 21–23, 2016	2016 Skate America	10; 47.87	9; 97.16	10; 145.03
September 8–11, 2016	2016 CS Lombardia Trophy	8; 54.61	6; 96.66	6; 151.27
2015–16 season
Date	Event	SP	FS	Total
February 16–21, 2016	2016 Four Continents Championships	2; 68.51	13; 106.61	7; 175.12
December 24–27, 2015	2015–16 Japan Championships	4; 66.02	8; 115.56	6; 181.58
November 13–15, 2015	2015 Trophée Éric Bompard	4; 58.30	cancelled	
October 30 – November 1, 2015	2015 Skate Canada International	3; 59.79	6; 111.80	4; 171.59
September 16–20, 2015	2015 U.S. Classic	5; 55.58	7; 92.02	7; 144.62
2014–15 season
Date	Event	SP	FS	Total
March 23–29, 2015	2015 World Championships	4; 65.48	8; 114.18	7; 179.66
December 26–28, 2014	2014–15 Japan Championships	9; 57.55	4; 110.74	5; 168.29
November 28–30, 2014	2014 NHK Trophy	3; 64.38	7; 108.71	4; 173.09
November 7–9, 2014	2014 Cup of China	3; 60.44	3; 108.95	3; 169.39
October 4, 2014	2014 Japan Open	–	4; 114.38	3T
2013–14 season
Date	Event	SP	FS	Total
March 24–30, 2014	2014 World Championships	10; 60.86	10; 111.58	10; 172.44
February 19–20, 2014	2014 Winter Olympics	15; 55.60	12; 115.38	12; 170.98
January 21–25, 2014	2014 Four Continents Championships	1; 64.73	1; 132.18	1; 196.91
December 20–23, 2013	2013–14 Japan Championships	3; 67.42	2; 135.10	2; 202.52
November 22–24, 2013	2013 Rostelecom Cup	9; 49.24	4; 113.22	7; 162.46
November 1–3, 2013	2013 Cup of China	4; 57.33	4; 108.62	4; 165.95
October 5, 2013	2013 Japan Open	–	5; 102.15	1T
2012–13 season
Date	Event	SP	FS	Total
March 13–17, 2013	2013 World Championships	3; 66.64	7; 123.09	4; 189.73
February 8–11, 2013	2013 Four Continents Championships	3; 64.04	3; 116.99	3; 181.03
December 20–24, 2012	2012–13 Japan Championships	5; 57.26	2; 126.41	2; 183.67
November 9–11, 2012	2012 Rostelecom Cup	6; 56.78	3; 109.56	4; 166.34
October 26–28, 2012	2012 Skate Canada International	4; 56.21	4; 111.83	3; 168.04
2011–12 season
Date	Event	SP	FS	Total
April 18–22, 2012	2012 World Team Trophy	3; 63.78	8; 95.84	6; 159.62
March 26–31, 2012	2012 World Championships	2; 62.67	5; 112.74	5; 175.41
February 7–12, 2012	2012 Four Continents Championships	3; 63.45	5; 105.87	4; 169.32
December 22–26, 2011	2011–12 Japan Championships	1; 65.56	6; 107.13	3; 172.69
November 18–20, 2011	2011 Trophée Éric Bompard	4; 55.77	4; 105.54	4; 161.31
November 4–6, 2011	2011 Cup of China	4; 53.09	7; 97.11	6; 150.20
2010–11 season
Date	Event	SP	FS	Total
April 24 – May 1, 2011	2011 World Championships	10; 54.86	7; 112.24	8; 167.10
February 3–5, 2011	2011 Asian Winter Games	1; 54.48	1; 122.56	1; 177.04
December 24–26, 2010	2010–11 Japan Championships	3; 61.50	3; 126.02	3; 187.52
December 9–12, 2010	2010–11 Grand Prix Final	3; 61.47	2; 117.12	3; 178.59
November 11–14, 2010	2010 Skate America	2; 54.75	2; 110.18	1; 164.93
October 22–24, 2010	2010 NHK Trophy	2; 56.10	5; 94.06	3; 150.16

=== Junior results ===
2009–10 season
Date	Event	Level	SP	FS	Total
March 8–14, 2010	2010 World Junior Championships	Junior	2; 59.00	1; 106.47	1; 165.47
December 25–27, 2009	2009–10 Japan Championships	Senior	5; 60.28	5; 116.33	5; 176.61
December 3–6, 2009	2009–10 Junior Grand Prix Final	Junior	2; 59.52	1; 101.01	1; 160.53
November 21–23, 2009	2009–10 Japan Junior Championships	Junior	1; 58.96	1; 106.89	1; 165.85
Oct. 28 – Nov. 1, 2009	2009 Ice Challenge	Senior	1; 59.40	1; 111.01	1; 170.41
October 7–11, 2009	2009 Junior Grand Prix, Croatia	Junior	1; 59.74	1; 95.18	1; 154.92
September 9–12, 2009	2009 Junior Grand Prix, Poland	Junior	1; 56.16	1; 104.69	1; 160.85
2008–09 season
Date	Event	Level	SP	FS	Total
February 4–8, 2009	2009 International Challenge Cup	Junior	1; 48.16	1; 87.98	1; 136.14
December 25–27, 2008	2008–09 Japan Championships	Senior	7; 55.74	8; 92.09	7; 147.83
November 23–24, 2008	2008–09 Japan Junior Championships	Junior	7; 48.94	1; 94.55	3; 144.15
December 11–14, 2008	2008–09 Junior Grand Prix Final	Junior	2; 51.04	3; 90.59	4; 141.63
October 15–18, 2008	2008 Junior Grand Prix, United Kingdom	Junior	1; 55.52	2; 98.32	1; 153.84
September 24–29, 2008	2008 Junior Grand Prix, Spain	Junior	2; 46.58	3; 80.29	3; 126.87

=== Novice results ===
2005–06 season
Date	Event	Level	SP	FS	Total
March 29–31, 2006	2006 Gardena Spring Trophy	Novice	1; 39.55	1; 66.51	1; 106.06
