= Sōta Yamamoto =

Japanese figure skater (born 2000)

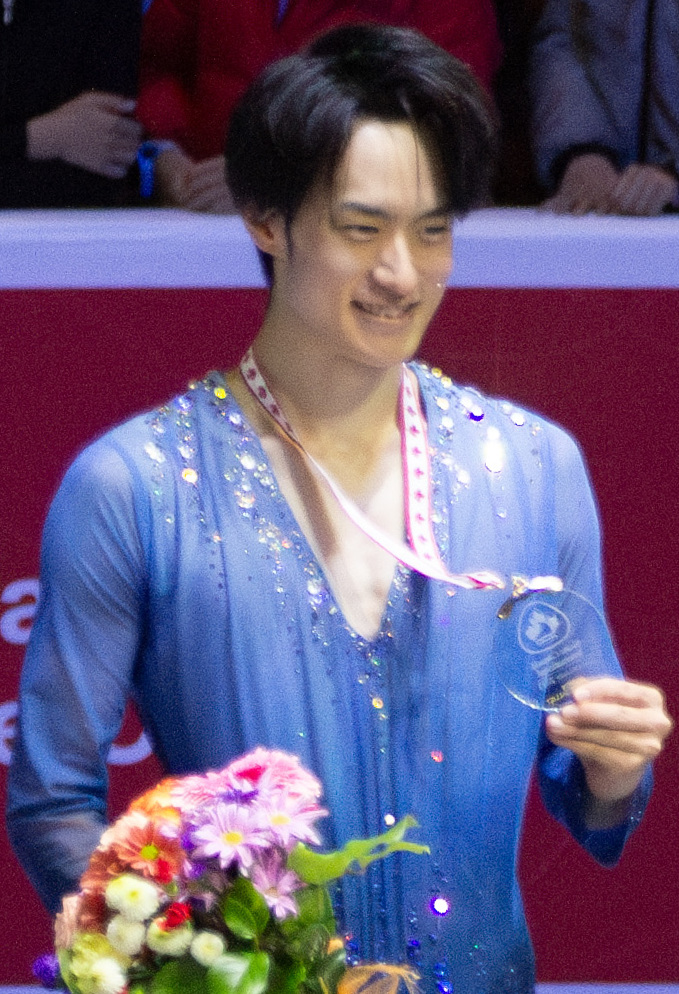
- Yamamoto at the 2023 Skate Canada International

Personal information
- Native name: 山本草太
- Born: January 10, 2000 (age 26) Kishiwada, Osaka, Japan
- Home town: Aichi
- Height: 1.73 m (5 ft 8 in)

Figure skating career
- Country: Japan
- Discipline: Men's singles
- Coach: Machiko Yamada; Yuko Hongo; Soshi Tanaka
- Skating club: Chukyo University
- Began skating: 2005

Medal record
Four Continents Championships
Bronze medal – third place	2026 Beijing	Singles
Grand Prix Final
Silver medal – second place	2022–23 Turin	Singles
Japan Championships
Bronze medal – third place	2023–24 Nagano	Singles
Winter Youth Olympics
Gold medal – first place	2016 Lillehammer	Singles
World Junior Championships
Bronze medal – third place	2015 Tallinn	Singles
Junior Grand Prix Final
Silver medal – second place	2014–15 Barcelona	Singles
Bronze medal – third place	2015–16 Barcelona	Singles

Sōta Yamamoto (山本 草太, Yamamoto Sōta; born 10 January 2000) is a Japanese figure skater. He is the 2026 Four Continents bronze medalist, the 2022–23 Grand Prix Final silver medalist, a three-time ISU Grand Prix medalist (including gold at the 2023 Skate Canada International), a five-time ISU Challenger Series medalist (three gold, two silver), the 2023 World University Games champion, and the 2023–24 Japanese national bronze medalist.

Earlier in his career, he was the 2016 Youth Olympic champion, the 2015 World Junior bronze medalist, a two-time Junior Grand Prix Final medalist (silver in 2014, bronze in 2015), and the 2015–16 Japan junior national champion.

== Personal life ==
Yamamoto was born on January 10, 2000, in Kishiwada, Osaka, Japan. He studied at the Chukyo University School of Sport Sciences and graduated in 2024.

His mother passed away in February 2026.

== Career ==
Yamamoto started skating when he was five. He is a 3-time Japanese national novice medalist. He was invited to skate in the gala at the 2013 World Team Trophy as the Japanese national novice champion in the same season.

=== 2013–14 season: Junior international debut ===
Yamamoto debuted on the ISU Junior Grand Prix series in 2013–14 season, placing 11th in Riga, Latvia, his sole assignment. At the Japan Championships, he was 5th in the junior competition and 14th at the senior event.

=== 2014–15 season: Junior Grand Prix Final silver and World Junior bronze ===
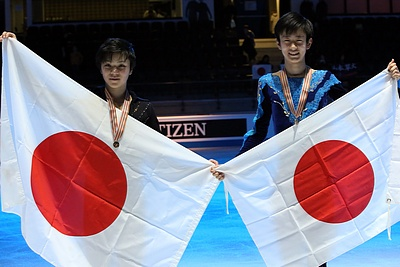
Yamamoto (right) with teammate Shoma Uno at the 2015 World Junior Championships

During the 2014–15 JGP series, Yamamoto won silver medals in Courchevel, France and Tallinn, Estonia, which qualified him to the 2014–15 JGP Final in Barcelona, Spain. Ranked first in the short program and third in the free skate, he finished second overall, behind Shoma Uno and ahead of Alexander Petrov. Nationally, he was the junior silver medalist, behind Shoma Uno, and finished 6th at the senior event. At the 2015 World Junior Championships, Yamamoto placed 7th in the short program and 3rd in the free skate to win the bronze medal in his first appearance at that competition.

=== 2015–16 season: Youth Olympic champion, Japan junior national title ===
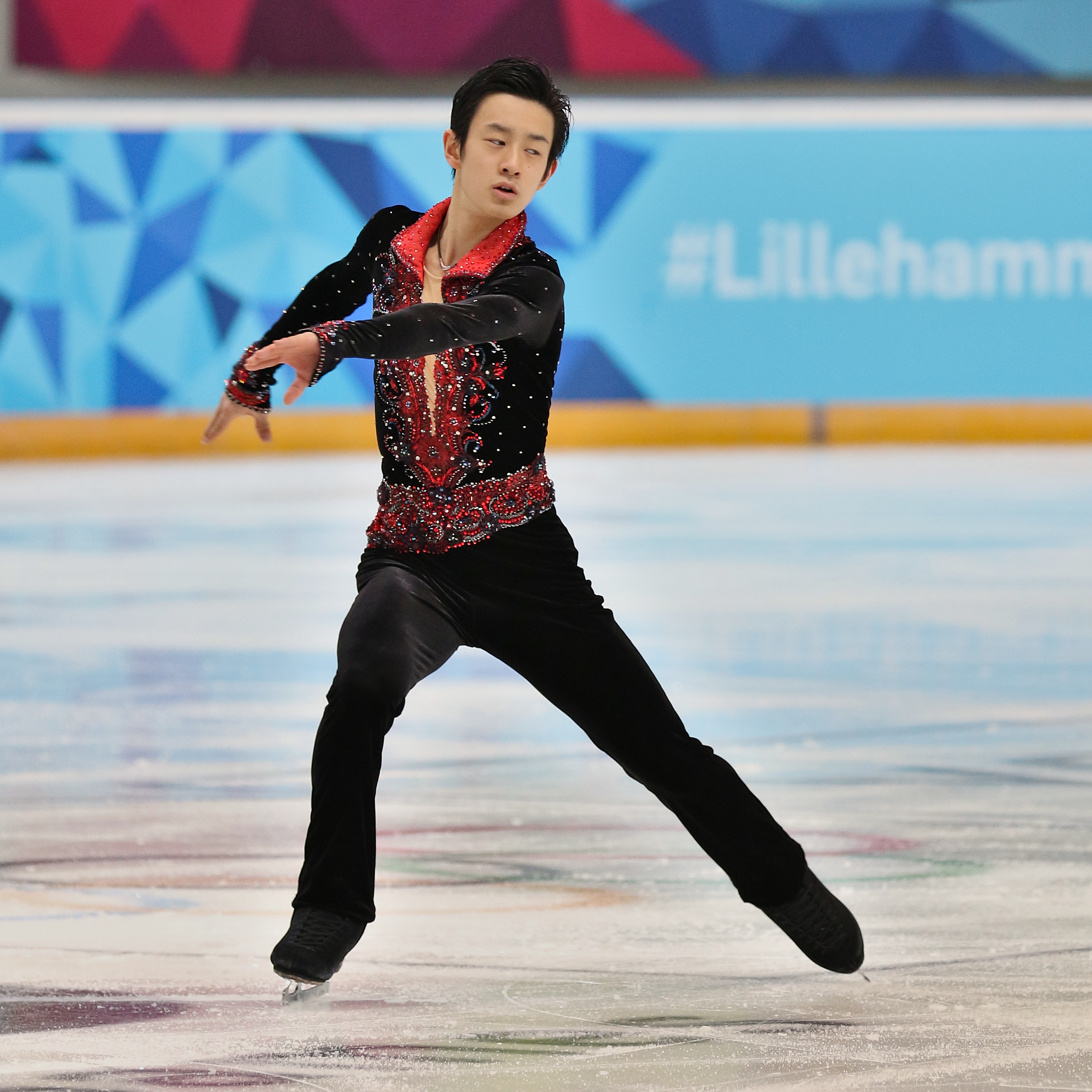
Yamamoto at the 2016 Winter Youth Olympics

Competing in the 2015–16 ISU Junior Grand Prix, Yamamoto won the bronze medal in Colorado Springs, Colorado, and gold in Toruń, Poland. These results qualified him for the 2015–16 JGP Final, where he was awarded the bronze medal. He won his first junior national title at the 2015 Japanese Junior Championships.

In February 2016, Yamamoto won the gold medal in the men's singles discipline at the Winter Youth Olympics ahead of Latvia's Deniss Vasiljevs and Russia's Dmitri Aliev. He fractured his right ankle in practice on March 12, causing him to withdraw from the 2016 World Junior Championships in Debrecen.

=== 2017–18 season: Senior international debut ===
After missing the entirety of the 2016–2017 season, Yamamoto returned to competition domestically at the 2017–18 Japan Championships, placing ninth. Venturing out internationally, he placed fifth at the Coupe du Printemps.

=== 2018–19 season: Grand Prix debut ===
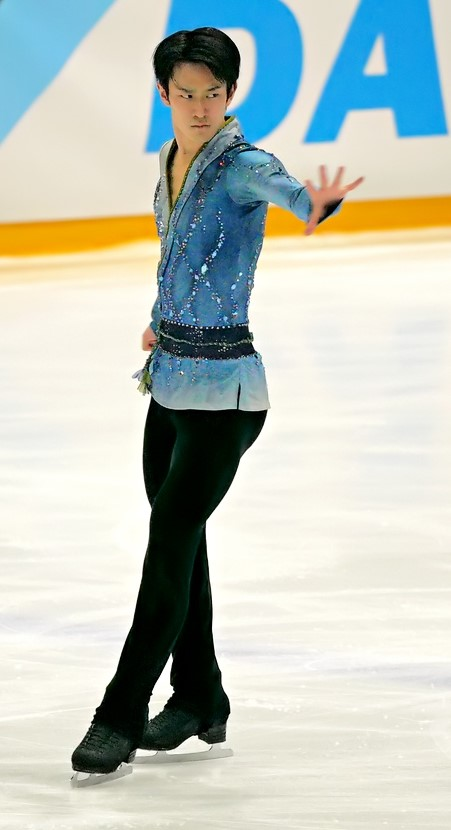
Yamamoto at the 2019 Challenge Cup

Debuting on the Challenger series, Yamamoto won gold at the 2018 CS Asian Open. He fared less well at his second Challenger, placing ninth at the 2018 CS Finlandia Trophy. Making his Grand Prix debut, Yamamoto was sixth at Japan's 2018 NHK Trophy. Ninth at the Japan Championships, he finished the season with a gold medal at the 2019 Challenge Cup.

=== 2019–20 season ===
Again beginning the season with two Challenger assignments, Yamamoto won the silver medal at the 2019 CS U.S. Classic after placing third in the short program and second in the free skate. the season at the 2019 CS Finlandia Trophy, and led the field after the short program, in which he set a new personal best and landed two quad jumps. He fell four times in the free skate, placing sixth in the segment, but narrowly took the silver medal overall.

=== 2020–21 season ===
Yamamoto won the gold medal at the domestic Western Sectionals championship, qualifying for a berth to the national championships. Assigned to the 2020 NHK Trophy, he placed eighth. He was ninth at the 2020–21 Japan Championships.

=== 2021–22 season ===
Yamamoto debuted on the Grand Prix at the 2021 Skate Canada International, finishing in seventh. He was seventh as well at the 2021 NHK Trophy, and said afterwards he felt he was "able to grow a little bit since Skate Canada." Yamamoto finished the fall season with a gold medal at the 2021 CS Warsaw Cup.

At the 2021–22 Japan Championships, Yamamoto finished in eight place. He went on to win the bronze medal at the International Challenge Cup.

=== 2022–23 season: Grand Prix Final silver ===
Beginning the season on the Grand Prix, Yamamoto won the short program at the 2022 Grand Prix de France. He was overtaken in the free skate by Frenchman Adam Siao Him Fa, but still scored a new personal best in that segment and won the silver medal, his first Grand Prix podium placement. Yamamoto reflected on his past struggles with injury, saying that it made the moment "special for me, and I know I couldn't have achieved it myself. I have had all the support from my team as well as support from the fans." At his second event, the 2022 NHK Trophy on home ice in Sapporo, Yamamoto again finished first in the short program with a new personal best score of 96.49, ahead of reigning World champion Shoma Uno. He was again overtaken in the free skate, this time by Uno, but won his second silver medal and qualified to the Grand Prix Final for the first time. He said that he was pleased at the prospect of competing together with Uno at the Final.

At the Final in Turin, Yamamoto finished second in the short program behind Uno. He assessed that his quad Salchow was "not perfect, but I am happy I was able to skate without any mistakes and going into the free skating, it will be a confidence boost." The segment also saw several other skaters, such as widely favoured American Ilia Malinin, underperform. In the free skate, Yamamoto set a new personal best (on his way to a personal best total score as well), finishing third in the segment behind Uno and Malinin, but remaining second overall. Winning the silver medal, he said he was pleased to have delivered a satisfactory free skate for the first time in the season and to have achieved his goal of making the podium.

Yamamoto finished third in the short program at the 2022–23 Japan Championships, but a seventh-place free skate dropped him to fifth overall. Despite this, due to the Japan Skating Federation's selection criteria incorporating international results, he was selected as Japan's third man for the 2023 World Championships, which occasioned some controversy due to national silver medalist Koshiro Shimada being passed over.

Named to the Japanese team for the 2023 Winter World University Games in Lake Placid, Yamamoto won the gold medal, finishing more than thirty points ahead of silver medalist Tatsuya Tsuboi. He then won the silver medal at the International Challenge Cup at the end of February. Yamamoto was fifteenth in his World Championship debut on home ice in Saitama.

=== 2023–24 season: Grand Prix gold, Japan national bronze ===
Yamamoto began the season at the 2023 CS Autumn Classic International, finishing in fourth place. Moving on to the Grand Prix, he started at the 2023 Skate Canada International. First in the short program despite an underrotated quad jump and a spin error, he was only third in the free skate, but remained in first place overall to claim his first Grand Prix gold medal. At the 2023 Cup of China, he finished in sixth place after struggles in the short program.

At the 2023–24 Japan Championships, Yamamoto finished second in the short program, albeit more than ten points behind segment leader Shoma Uno. In the free skate he came third, and placed third overall, winning the bronze medal and standing on the Japanese national podium for the first time in his senior career. Reflecting on his career, Yamamoto said there "were good times and bad times, and there were really tough days. But I'm glad I did my best even through those times. This is the result I was aiming for, but I want to look even further ahead, set my goals even higher, and grow even more."

Yamamoto competed at the 2024 Four Continents Championships in Shanghai, coming fourth in both segments and finishing fourth overall. “My goal is to channel this experience into something beneficial for my future endeavors,” Yamamoto said. “I intend to leverage the lessons learned from the Four Continents and the regrets from this experience in the upcoming season."

=== 2024–25 season ===
Yamamoto opened the season by winning gold at the 2024 CS Nebelhorn Trophy. Going on to compete on the 2024–25 Grand Prix circuit, Yamamoto placed third in the short program at 2024 Skate Canada International. However, he dropped to fourth after making a few costly mistakes during his free skate. “This is my third time at this event,” Yamamoto said of Skate Canada. “Every time I hear the audience, I get a lot of energy from them, a lot of power from them. So, this is an event that I really enjoy coming to every time. I’m grateful for the crowd reaction!” Following the event, Christopher Tin, who composed one of tracks that Yamamoto used for his free program, praised Yamamoto's performance on his social media accounts. Three weeks later, Yamamoto would also place fourth at the 2024 Finlandia Trophy. “It is very important now for me to prepare for nationals and do well there,” he said. “Of course, my goal is to qualify for worlds, but I will put all my focus on nationals now.”

In December, Yamamoto finished tenth at the 2024–25 Japan Championships and was named as the third alternate to the 2025 World Championship team. One month later, Yamamoto competed at the 2025 Winter World University Games in Turin, Italy, where he finished in sixth place. He then closed the season by winning the bronze medal at the 2025 Road to 26 Trophy

=== 2025–26 season: Four Continents bronze ===
In late August, Yamamoto developed a hernia in his lower back from practicing a quadruple flip jump. Despite this, he competed at the 2025 CS Kinoshita Group Cup the following week, where he finished in fourth place. As a result of this injury, Yamamoto subsequently withdrew from the 2025 CS Trialeti Trophy.

He then went on to compete on the 2025–26 Grand Prix circuit, finishing ninth at the 2025 Cup of China and sixth at the 2025 Finlandia Trophy. In December, he finished fifth at the 2025–26 Japan Championships and was named as the second alternate for the 2026 Winter Olympic team.

The following month, Yamamoto won the bronze medal at the 2026 Four Continents Figure Skating Championships after placing third in both segments of the event. The skater said it had been a long-time goal for him. "Today, I finally achieved this goal," he said after the free skate.

=== 2026–27 season ===
Yamamoto opened the new season on the Grand Prix series at the 2026 Grand Prix de France where he placed fifth overall.

== Programs ==
Season	Short program	Free skating	Exhibition
2026–2027	Tombeau de Vivaldi by Cicely Parnas & Spearfisher choreo. by Kana Muramoto	El Tango de Roxanne (from Moulin Rouge!) performed by Ewan McGregor, Jacek Koman, & José Feliciano choreo. by Kenji Miyamoto	
2025–2026	Yesterday by The Beatles performed by Michael Bolton choreo. by Mihoko Higuchi	Hallelujah by Leonard Cohen choreo. by Lori Nichol	Love Theme (from Cinema Paradiso) performed by Joseph Calleja, Steven Mercurio, & BBC Concert Orchestra
2024–2025	Split, Postcards from Far Away (The Tea Room) by Ezio Bosso arranged by Cédric Tour choreo. by Benoît Richaud	Melting by Nico Cartosio; Sogno di Volare ("The Dream of Flight") by Christopher Tin choreo. by Lori Nichol	Teeth by 5 Seconds of Summer choreo. by Misao Sato; Beat It by Michael Jackson performed by Fujii Kaze choreo. by Misao Sato
2023–2024	Chameleon by Maynard Ferguson, Herbie Hancock, Bennie Maupin, Harvey Mason, & Paul Jackson choreo. by David Wilson	Exogenesis: Symphony Part 3: Redemption by Muse choreo. by Kenji Miyamoto	Teeth by 5 Seconds of Summer choreo. by Misao Sato
2022–2023	Yesterday by The Beatles performed by Michael Bolton choreo. by Mihoko Higuchi	Piano Concerto No. 2 by Sergei Rachmaninoff, Walter Afanasieff choreo. by Akiko Suzuki	Poeta by Vicente Amigo choreo. by Kenji Miyamoto
2021–2022	Yesterday by The Beatles performed by Michael Bolton choreo. by Mihoko Higuchi	Io Ci Saro by David Foster, Walter Afanasieff performed by Andrea Bocelli choreo. by Mihoko Higuchi	
2020–2021	Dark Eyes choreo. by Kenji Miyamoto	Dragon: The Bruce Lee Story by Randy Edelman choreo. by Kenji Miyamoto	
2019–2020	East of Eden by Lee Holdridge choreo. by Pasquale Camerlengo	In This Shirt by The Irrepressibles choreo. by Pasquale Camerlengo	You're Beautiful by James Blunt
2018–2019	Air on the G String by Johann Sebastian Bach choreo. by Kenji Miyamoto	Nobunaga Concerto by Taku Takahashi choreo. by Kenji Miyamoto	Anthem Performed by Josh Groban choreo. by Akiko Suzuki
2017–2018	Anthem Performed by Josh Groban choreo. by Akiko Suzuki	Jekyll & Hyde by Frank Wildhorn and Steve Cuden choreo. by Kenji Miyamoto	
2015–2016	Poeta by Vicente Amigo choreo. by Kenji Miyamoto	Piano Concerto No. 1 by Pyotr Ilyich Tchaikovsky choreo. by Kenji Miyamoto	Love Theme performed by Joseph Calleja
2014–2015	Piano Concerto by Sergei Rachmaninoff	Lorelei by Naoki Satō	Love Theme performed by Joseph Calleja; Tenchijin by Michiru Ōshima
2013–2014	Tenchijin by Michiru Ōshima	Lorelei by Naoki Satō	
2012–2013		Dragon: The Bruce Lee Story by Randy Edelman choreo. by Kenji Miyamoto	

== Competitive highlights ==
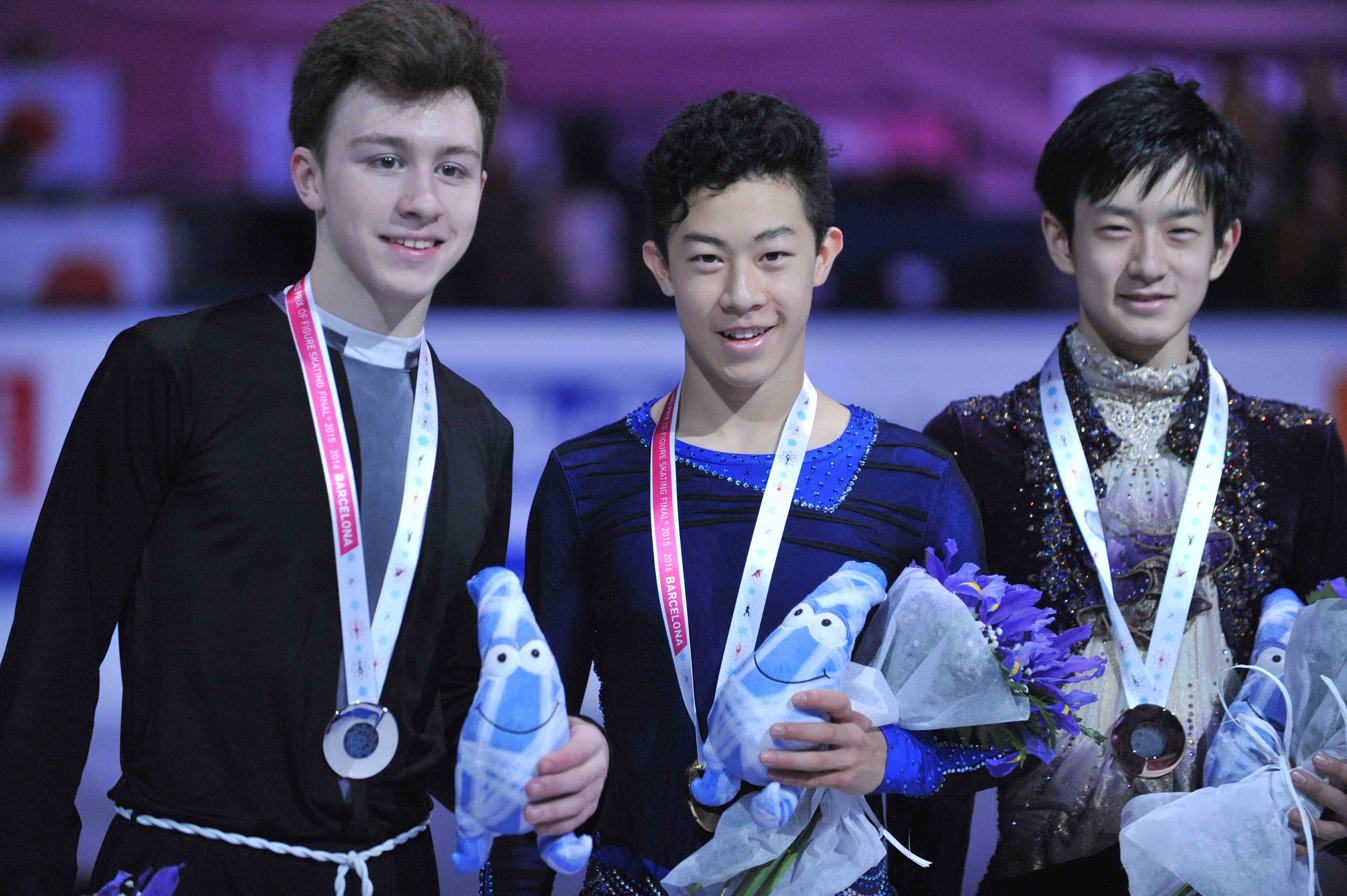
Yamamoto (right) at the 2015–16 Junior Grand Prix Final podium

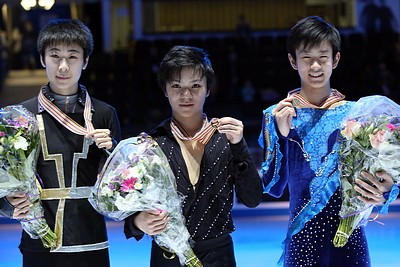
Yamamoto (right) at the 2015 World Junior Championships podium

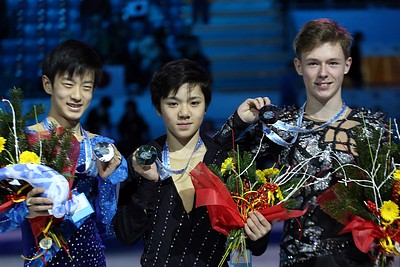
Yamamoto (left) at the 2014–15 JGP Final podium

- GP – Event of the ISU Grand Prix Series
- JGP – Event of the ISU Junior Grand Prix Series
- CS – Event of the ISU Challenger Series
- TBD – Assigned
- WD – Withdrew from competition
- Medals at team events are awarded for the team results only. Individual placements at team events are listed in parentheses.

Competition placements at senior level
Season	2017–18	2018–19	2019–20	2020–21	2021–22	2022–23	2023–24	2024–25	2025–26	2026–27
World Championships						15th				
Four Continents Championships							4th		3rd	
Grand Prix Final						2nd				
Japan Championships	9th	9th	7th	9th	8th	5th	3rd	10th	5th	
GP Cup of China							6th		9th	
GP Finland								4th	6th	
GP France						2nd				5th
GP NHK Trophy		6th	6th	8th	7th	2nd				
GP Skate America										7th
GP Skate Canada					7th		1st	4th		
CS Asian Open Trophy		1st								
CS Autumn Classic							4th			
CS Finlandia Trophy		9th	2nd							
CS Kinoshita Group Cup									4th	WD
CS Nebelhorn Trophy								1st		
CS Trialeti Trophy									WD	
CS U.S. Classic			2nd							
CS Warsaw Cup					1st					
Challenge Cup		1st			3rd	2nd				
Coupe du Printemps	5th									
Japan Open				1st (2nd)	1st (4th)					
Road to 26 Trophy								3rd		
Winter University Games						1st		6th		

Competition placements at junior level
Season	2011–12	2012–13	2013–14	2014–15	2015–16
Winter Youth Olympics					1st
World Junior Championships				3rd	
Junior Grand Prix Final				2nd	3rd
Japan Championships (Senior)			14th	6th	6th
Japan Championships (Junior)	11th	4th	5th	2nd	1st
JGP Estonia				2nd	
JGP France				2nd	
JGP Latvia			11th		
JGP Poland					1st
JGP United States					3rd
Coupe du Printemps			1st		

== Detailed results ==
ISU personal best scores in the +5/-5 GOE System
Segment	Type	Score	Event
Total	TSS	274.35	2022-23 Grand Prix Final
Short program	TSS	96.49	2022 NHK Trophy
Short program	TES	55.46	2022 NHK Trophy
Short program	PCS	41.03	2022 NHK Trophy
Free skating	TSS	183.72	2024 CS Nebelhorn Trophy
Free skating	TES	101.30	2024 CS Nebelhorn Trophy
Free skating	PCS	83.82	2023 Skate Canada International

ISU personal best scores in the +3/-3 GOE System
Segment	Type	Score	Event
Total	TSS	232.42	2015 JGP Poland
Short program	TSS	76.14	2014–15 Junior Grand Prix Final
Short program	TES	43.46	2014–15 Junior Grand Prix Final
Short program	PCS	34.85	2016 Winter Youth Olympics
Free skating	TSS	157.26	2015 JGP Poland
Free skating	TES	86.74	2015 JGP Poland
Free skating	PCS	70.80	2016 Winter Youth Olympics

- Small medals for the short program and free skating are only awarded at ISU Championships.
- Medals at team events are awarded for the team results only. Individual placements at team events are listed in parentheses.

=== Senior level ===
Results in the 2013–14 season
Date	Event	SP		FS		Total	
Date	Event	P	Score	P	Score	P	Score
Dec 20–23, 2013	2013–14 Japan Championships	11	65.90	19	104.72	14	170.62

Results in the 2014–15 season
Date	Event	SP		FS		Total	
Date	Event	P	Score	P	Score	P	Score
Dec 26–28, 2014	2014–15 Japan Championships	7	67.19	6	139.61	6	206.80

Results in the 2015–16 season
Date	Event	SP		FS		Total	
Date	Event	P	Score	P	Score	P	Score
Dec 24–27, 2015	2015–16 Japan Championships	11	62.92	5	152.23	6	215.15

Results in the 2017–18 season
Date	Event	SP		FS		Total	
Date	Event	P	Score	P	Score	P	Score
Dec 20–24, 2017	2017–18 Japan Championships	8	72.88	10	135.39	9	208.27
Mar 16–18, 2018	(Luxembourg) 2018 Coupe du Printemps	6	69.04	5	128.77	5	197.81

Results in the 2018–19 season
Date	Event	SP		FS		Total	
Date	Event	P	Score	P	Score	P	Score
Aug 1–5, 2018	(Thailand) 2018 CS Asian Open Trophy	6	57.92	1	141.00	1	198.92
Oct 5–7, 2018	(Finland) 2018 CS Finlandia Trophy	8	72.16	10	133.63	9	205.79
Nov 9–11, 2018	(Japan) 2018 NHK Trophy	6	74.98	5	138.42	6	213.40
Dec 20–24, 2018	2018–19 Japan Championships	10	71.95	8	140.74	9	212.69
Feb 21–24, 2019	(Netherlands) 2019 International Challenge Cup	1	82.24	1	171.63	1	253.87

Results in the 2019–20 season
Date	Event	SP		FS		Total	
Date	Event	P	Score	P	Score	P	Score
Sep 17–22, 2019	(United States) 2019 CS U.S. International Classic	3	82.88	2	157.23	2	240.11
Oct 11–14, 2019	(Finland) 2019 CS Finlandia Trophy	1	92.81	6	130.43	2	223/24
Nov 22–24, 2019	(Japan) 2019 NHK Trophy	7	74.88	5	151.39	6	226.27
Dec 18–22, 2019	2019–20 Japan Championships	13	68.16	7	152.33	7	220.49

Results in the 2020–21 season
Date	Event	SP		FS		Total	
Date	Event	P	Score	P	Score	P	Score
Oct 3, 2020	2020 Japan Open	–	–	2	137.97	1	–
Nov 27–29, 2020	(Japan) 2020 NHK Trophy	9	62.38	7	127.81	8	190.19
Dec 24–27, 2020	2020–21 Japan Championships	9	82.60	6	134.74	9	217.34

Results in the 2021–22 season
Date	Event	SP		FS		Total	
Date	Event	P	Score	P	Score	P	Score
Oct 2, 2021	2021 Japan Open	–	–	4	156.13	1	–
Oct 29–31, 2021	2021 Skate Canada International	7	78.78	8	146.96	7	225.74
Nov 12–14, 2021	(Japan) 2021 NHK Trophy	5	86.05	8	152.85	7	238.90
Nov 17–20, 2021	(Poland) 2021 CS Warsaw Cup	1	91.75	3	155.90	1	247.65
Dec 22–26, 2021	2021–22 Japan Championships	4	93.79	12	146.39	8	240.18
Feb 24–27, 2022	(Netherlands) 2022 International Challenge Cup	1	90.25	3	147.51	3	237.76

Results in the 2022–23 season
Date	Event	SP		FS		Total	
Date	Event	P	Score	P	Score	P	Score
Nov 4–6, 2022	2022 Grand Prix de France	1	92.42	3	165.48	2	257.90
Nov 18–20, 2022	(Japan) 2022 NHK Trophy	1	96.49	6	161.36	2	257.85
Dec 8–11, 2022	(Italy) 2022–23 Grand Prix Final	2	94.86	3	179.49	2	274.35
Dec 21–25, 2022	2022–23 Japan Championships	3	86.89	7	158.52	5	245.41
Jan 13–15, 2022	(United States) 2023 Winter World University Games	1	101.32	1	173.54	1	274.86
Feb 23–26, 2023	(Netherlands) 2023 International Challenge Cup	2	84.72	2	160.89	2	245.61
Mar 20–26, 2023	(Japan) 2023 World Championships	17	75.48	15	156.91	15	232.39

Results in the 2023–24 season
Date	Event	SP		FS		Total	
Date	Event	P	Score	P	Score	P	Score
Sep 14–16, 2023	(Canada) 2023 CS Autumn Classic International	7	70.39	3	160.84	4	231.23
Oct 27–29, 2023	2023 Skate Canada International	1	89.56	3	168.86	1	258.42
Nov 10–12, 2023	2023 Cup of China	8	75.48	5	170.10	6	245.58
Dec 20–24, 2023	2023–24 Japan Championships	2	94.58	3	192.42	3	287.00

Results in the 2024–25 season
Date	Event	SP		FS		Total	
Date	Event	P	Score	P	Score	P	Score
Sep 19–21, 2024	(Germany) 2024 CS Nebelhorn Trophy	3	79.00	1	183.72	1	262.72
Oct 25–27, 2024	2024 Skate Canada International	3	92.16	3	164.84	4	257.00
Nov 15-17, 2024	(Finland) 2024 Finlandia Trophy	4	82.43	3	167.48	4	249.91
Dec 19–22, 2024	2024–25 Japan Championships	7	80.10	12	136.99	10	217.09
Jan 16–18, 2025	(Italy) 2025 Winter World University Games	6	78.81	5	163.42	6	242.23
Feb 18–20, 2025	(Italy) Road to 26 Trophy	4	83.79	3	153.68	3	237.47

Results in the 2025–26 season
Date	Event	SP		FS		Total	
Date	Event	P	Score	P	Score	P	Score
Sep 5–7, 2025	(Japan) 2025 CS Kinoshita Group Cup	3	84.98	6	148.93	4	233.91
Oct 24–26, 2025	2025 Cup of China	4	87.57	11	124.10	9	211.67
Nov 21–23, 2025	(Finland) 2025 Finlandia Trophy	7	81.09	5	157.36	6	238.45
Dec 18–21, 2025	2025–26 Japan Championships	6	82.21	5	156.73	5	238.94
Jan 21–25, 2026	(China) 2026 Four Continents Championships	3	94.68	3	175.39	3	270.07

Results in the 2026-27 season
Date	Event	SP		FS		Total	
Date	Event	P	Score	P	Score	P	Score
Oct 23–25, 2026	2026 Grand Prix de France	8	77.02	4	147.22	5	224.24
13–15, Nov 2026	(United States) 2026 Skate America	2	91.29	10	140.05	10	231.34

=== Junior level ===
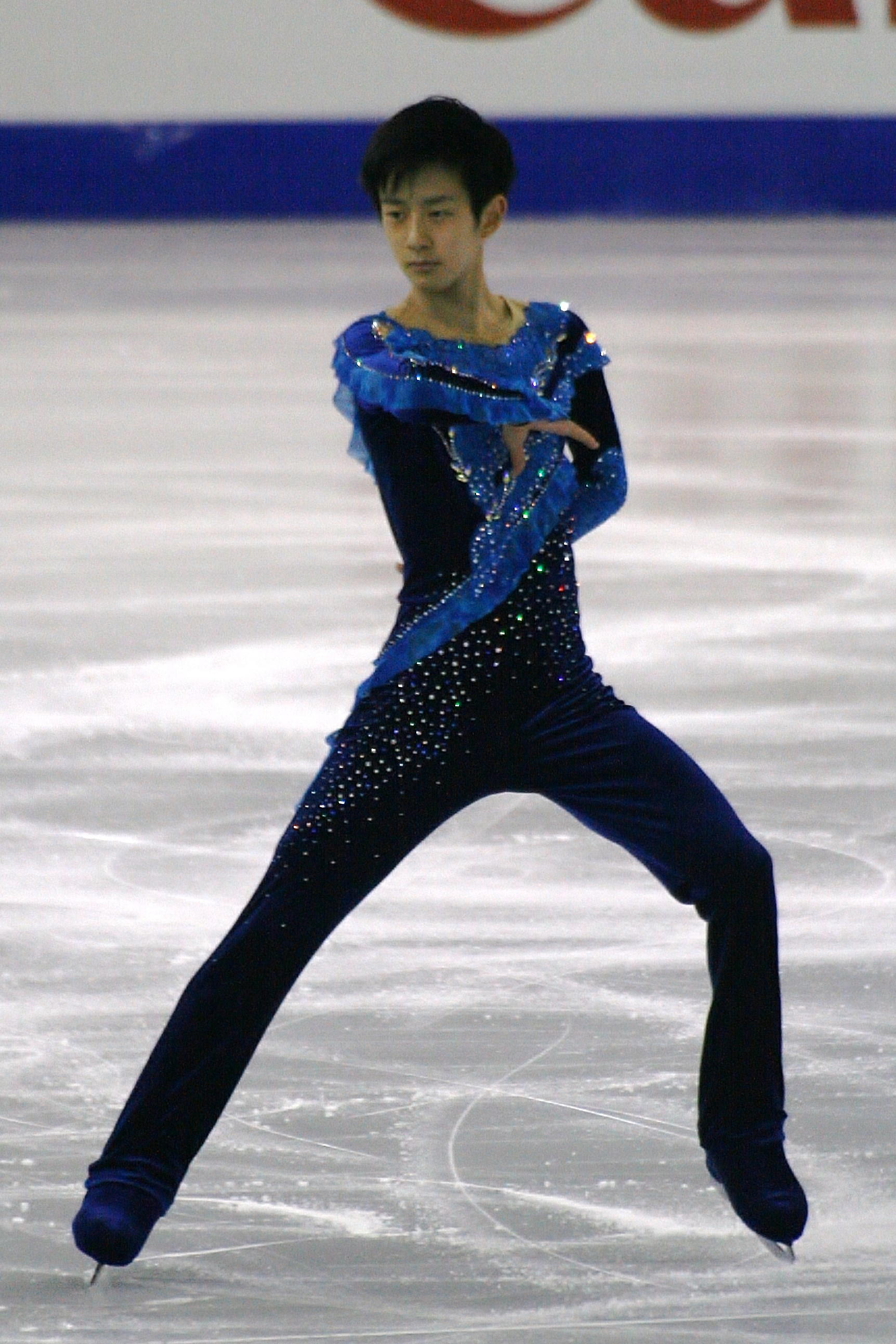
Yamamoto at the 2014–15 Junior Grand Prix Final

Results in the 2011–12 season
Date	Event	SP		FS		Total	
Date	Event	P	Score	P	Score	P	Score
Nov 25–27, 2011	2011–12 Japan Championships (Junior)	14	41.62	10	90.98	11	132.60

Results in the 2012–13 season
Date	Event	SP		FS		Total	
Date	Event	P	Score	P	Score	P	Score
Nov 17–18, 2012	2012–13 Japan Championships (Junior)	11	47.32	4	112.29	4	159.61

Results in the 2013–14 season
Date	Event	SP		FS		Total	
Date	Event	P	Score	P	Score	P	Score
Aug 28–31, 2013	2013 JGP Latvia	11	56.15	12	100.08	11	156.23
Nov 22–24, 2013	2013–14 Japan Championships (Junior)	3	62.28	10	103.82	5	166.10
Mar 14–16, 2014	(Luxembourg) 2014 Coupe du Printemps	1	65.24	–	–	1	65.24

Results in the 2014–15 season
Date	Event	SP		FS		Total	
Date	Event	P	Score	P	Score	P	Score
Aug 20–23, 2014	2014 JGP France	3	65.66	2	130.14	2	195.80
Sep 24–27, 2014	2014 JGP Estonia	2	66.42	2	136.28	2	202.70
Nov 22–24, 2014	2014–15 Japan Championships (Junior)	2	67.81	1	134.69	2	202.50
Dec 10–14, 2014	(Spain) 2014–15 Junior Grand Prix Final	1	76.14	3	136.98	2	213.12
Mar 2–8, 2015	(Estonia) 2015 World Junior Championships	7	69.99	3	145.46	3	215.45

Results in the 2015–16 season
Date	Event	SP		FS		Total	
Date	Event	P	Score	P	Score	P	Score
Sep 2–5, 2015	2015 JGP United States	2	65.11	3	138.57	3	203.68
Sep 23–26, 2015	2015 JGP Poland	1	75.16	1	157.26	1	232.42
Nov 21–23, 2015	2015–16 Japan Championships (Junior)	1	70.42	1	142.98	1	213.40
Dec 9–13, 2015	(Spain) 2015–16 Junior Grand Prix Final	3	72.85	4	132.46	3	205.31
Feb 12–21, 2016	(Norway) 2016 Winter Youth Olympics	1	73.07	3	142.45	1	215.52
