= Vanessa-Mae discography =

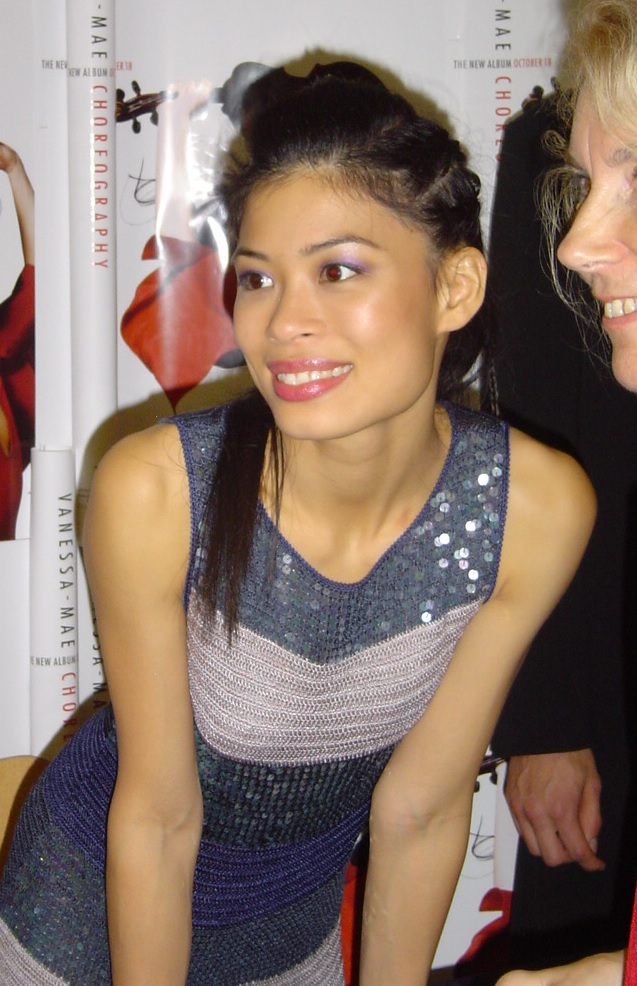
- Vanessa-Mae, 2004
- Studio albums: 10
- EPs: 1
- Compilation albums: 4
- Singles: 10

This is a comprehensive discography of Vanessa-Mae, a Singaporean-born British violinist with Thai heritage from her father.

== Studio albums ==
| Title | Album details | Peak chart positions | | | | | | | | Certifications |
| Title | Album details | UK | AUS | AUT | GER | HUN | SWI | NLD | JPN | Certifications |
|---|---|---|---|---|---|---|---|---|---|---|
| Violin | Released: 1 March 1991; Label: Tritico; Formats: CD, digital download | — | — | — | — | — | — | — | — | |
| Kids' Classics | Released: 1 September 1991; Label: Tritico; Formats: CD, digital download | — | — | — | — | — | — | — | — | |
| Tchaikovsky & Beethoven Violin Concertos | Released: 1 October 1991; Label: Tritico; Formats: CD, digital download | — | — | — | — | — | — | — | — | |
| The Violin Player | Released: 16 May 1995; Label: EMI; Formats: CD, digital download | 11 | 2 | 1 | 20 | 12 | 14 | 47 | 98 | UK: Gold; AUT: Platinum; FIN: Platinum; SWI: Gold |
| The Classical Album 1 | Released: 12 November 1996; Label: EMI; Formats: CD, digital download | 47 | — | 20 | 69 | — | 32 | 53 | — | POL: Gold |
| China Girl: The Classical Album 2 | Released: 9 September 1997; Label: EMI; Formats: CD, digital download | 56 | — | 31 | — | — | 35 | — | 113 | |
| Storm | Released: 29 October 1997; Label: EMI; Formats: CD, digital download | 27 | — | 4 | 55 | 33 | 26 | 48 | — | UK: Silver; AUT: Gold |
| The Original Four Seasons and the Devil's Trill Sonata: The Classical Album 3 | Released: 16 February 1999; Label: EMI; Formats: CD, digital download | 82 | 60 | — | 29 | — | — | — | — | POL: Gold |
| Subject to Change | Released: 17 July 2001; Label: EMI; Formats: CD, digital download | 58 | — | 39 | 52 | 28 | 58 | — | — | |
| Choreography | Released: 20 April 2004; Label: Sony Classical; Formats: CD, digital download | 66 | — | — | — | — | — | — | — | |
"—" denotes a recording that did not chart or was not released in that territory.

== EPs ==
| Title | Album details |
|---|---|
| The Alternative Record from Vanessa-Mae | Released: 1996; Label: EMI; Formats: CD |

== Compilation albums ==
| Title | Album details | Peak chart positions |
| Title | Album details | UK |
|---|---|---|
| The Classical Collection: Part 1 | Released: 7 November 2000; Label: EMI; Formats: CD (BOX) | — |
| The Best of Vanessa-Mae | Released: 5 November 2002; Label: EMI; Formats: CD, digital download | 181 |
| The Ultimate Vanessa-Mae | Released: 23 December 2003; Label: EMI; Formats: CD, digital download | — |
| Platinum Collection | Released: 5 February 2007; Label: EMI; Formats: CD | — |
"—" denotes a recording that did not chart or was not released in that territory.

== Singles ==
| Title | Year | Peak chart positions | | | Album |
| Title | Year | UK | AUS | GER | Album |
|---|---|---|---|---|---|
| "Toccata & Fugue" | 1995 | 16 | 95 | 40 | The Violin Player |
| "Red Hot" | 1995 | 37 | — | — | The Violin Player |
| "Classical Gas" | 1995 | 41 | — | — | The Violin Player |
| "I'm a Doun for Lack O' Johnnie (A Little Scottish Fantasy)" | 1996 | 28 | — | — | The Classical Album 1 |
| "Storm" | 1997 | 54 | — | — | Storm |
| "Happy Valley" | 1997 | — | — | — | Storm |
| "I Feel Love" | 1997 | 41 | — | — | Storm |
| "Reflection / Devil's Trill" | 1998 | 53 | — | — | The Original Four Seasons and the Devil's Trill Sonata: The Classical Album 3 |
| "White Bird" | 2001 | 66 | — | — | Subject to Change |
| "Destiny" | 2001 | — | — | — | Subject to Change |
"—" denotes a recording that did not chart or was not released in that territory.

== Other appearances ==
| Year | Song(s) | Artist | Album | Ref |
|---|---|---|---|---|
| 1997 | "The Velvet Rope" | Janet Jackson | The Velvet Rope | |
| 1998 | "Because" | George Martin | In My Life | |
| 2001 | "Francis Elena" | Takuro | Flow of Soul Vol.1 ~Takuro meets Vanessa-Mae~ | |
| 2003 | "Xhalation", "Xcogitate", "Xemplify", "Xpectation", "Xogenous", "Xosphere" and "Xpedition" | Prince | Xpectation | |
