= Shoma Uno =

Japanese figure skater (born 1997)

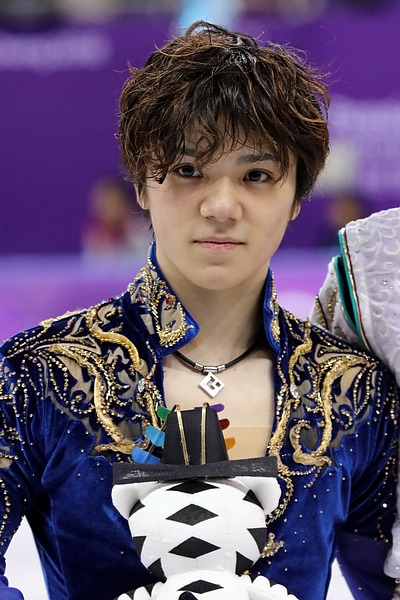
- Uno at the 2018 Winter Olympics

Personal information
- Native name: 宇野 昌磨
- Born: 17 December 1997 (age 28) Nagoya, Japan
- Education: Chukyo University
- Occupation: Figure skater
- Height: 1.58 m (5 ft 2 in)

Figure skating career
- Country: Japan
- Discipline: Ice dance (since 2026); Men's singles (until 2024)
- Partner: Marin Honda
- Began skating: 2002
- Competitive: 2009–2024, 2026–present
- Highest WS: 1st (2022–23)

Medal record
Event	Gold medal – first place	Silver medal – second place	Bronze medal – third place
Olympic Games	0	2	1
World Championships	2	2	0
Four Continents Championships	1	1	1
Grand Prix Final	1	3	2
Japan Championships	6	4	0
World Team Trophy	1	1	1
Winter Youth Olympics	1	1	0
World Junior Championships	1	0	0
Junior Grand Prix Final	1	0	0
Medal list
Olympic Games
Silver medal – second place	2018 Pyeongchang	Singles
Silver medal – second place	2022 Beijing	Team
Bronze medal – third place	2022 Beijing	Singles
World Championships
Gold medal – first place	2022 Montpellier	Singles
Gold medal – first place	2023 Saitama	Singles
Silver medal – second place	2017 Helsinki	Singles
Silver medal – second place	2018 Milan	Singles
Four Continents Championships
Gold medal – first place	2019 Anaheim	Singles
Silver medal – second place	2018 Taipei	Singles
Bronze medal – third place	2017 Gangneung	Singles
Grand Prix Final
Gold medal – first place	2022–23 Turin	Singles
Silver medal – second place	2017–18 Nagoya	Singles
Silver medal – second place	2018–19 Vancouver	Singles
Silver medal – second place	2023–24 Beijing	Singles
Bronze medal – third place	2015–16 Barcelona	Singles
Bronze medal – third place	2016–17 Marseille	Singles
Japan Championships
Gold medal – first place	2016–17 Osaka	Singles
Gold medal – first place	2017–18 Tokyo	Singles
Gold medal – first place	2018–19 Osaka	Singles
Gold medal – first place	2019–20 Tokyo	Singles
Gold medal – first place	2022–23 Osaka	Singles
Gold medal – first place	2023–24 Nagano	Singles
Silver medal – second place	2014–15 Nagano	Singles
Silver medal – second place	2015–16 Sapporo	Singles
Silver medal – second place	2020–21 Nagano	Singles
Silver medal – second place	2021–22 Saitama	Singles
World Team Trophy
Gold medal – first place	2017 Tokyo	Team
Silver medal – second place	2019 Fukuoka	Team
Bronze medal – third place	2021 Osaka	Team
Winter Youth Olympics
Gold medal – first place	2012 Innsbruck	Team
Silver medal – second place	2012 Innsbruck	Singles
World Junior Championships
Gold medal – first place	2015 Tallinn	Singles
Junior Grand Prix Final
Gold medal – first place	2014–15 Barcelona	Singles

Shoma Uno (宇野 昌磨, Uno Shōma; born 17 December 1997) is a Japanese figure skater. As a singles skater, he is a three-time Olympic medalist (2018 silver, 2022 bronze, 2022 team silver (Note: On 29 January 2024, the CAS disqualified Russian skater Kamila Valieva for four years retroactive to 25 December 2021, for an anti-doping rule violation. On 30 January 2024, the ISU reallocated medals to upgrade the United States to gold and Japan to silver, while downgrading the ROC to bronze.)), a two-time World champion (2022, 2023), and a two-time World silver medalist (2018, 2017). He was also the 2019 Four Continents champion, the 2022–23 Grand Prix Final champion, a fourteen-time Grand Prix medalist (8 gold, 6 silver), the 2017 Asian Winter Games champion, and a six-time Japanese national champion (2016–2019, 2022–2023). At the junior level, Uno is the 2015 World Junior champion, the 2014–15 Junior Grand Prix Final champion, and 2012 Youth Olympic silver medalist.

Uno is the first skater to successfully land a quadruple flip, and the second skater behind Yuzuru Hanyu to land a quadruple loop in an international competition. In 2023, Uno became the first man from Japan to win back-to-back world titles. He is also the historic record-holder for the highest score by a junior in the short program.

After first retiring in 2024, Uno announced in May 2026 that he and his partner, Marin Honda, were returning to professional competition as an ice dance team.

== Early life and family ==
Shoma Uno was born on 17 December 1997, in Nagoya, Japan, to Junko and Hiroki Uno. He has a younger brother, Itsuki, and his grandfather is Japanese painter Fujio Uno. Uno was born prematurely, weighing only 900 grams (32 oz) and fitting in the palm of his father's hand. The blanket used to cover him was a handkerchief. He suffered from asthma as a child and was in and out of hospitals. To strengthen his body, his parents had him try all kinds of sports like soccer, tennis, and ballet. However, in soccer, he was always terrified of the other players and hid behind the goal.

== Career ==
=== Singles skating ===
==== Early years ====
Uno started skating when he was five because of Mao Asada, who talked to him at a skating rink, and he liked skating so much that he begged his parents to go back to the rink. He enrolled in skating classes in Nagoya and started practicing 5–6 hours a day.

His figure skating idol is Daisuke Takahashi. Uno won bronze at the Japan Junior Championships of the 2009–2010 season but did not finish on the podium in either of the next two years.

=== Junior career ===
==== 2011–2012 season: Junior international debut ====
Uno made his Junior Grand Prix (JGP) debut in the 2011–2012 season, winning a bronze medal at the JGP Tallinn Cup in Estonia after placing 4th at the event in Poland. At the 2012 Winter Youth Olympics, he won silver in the individual event and gold in the team event. He finished 10th at the 2012 World Junior Championships. Uno was invited to skate in the gala at the 2012 World Team Trophy as the silver medalist in Winter Youth Olympics.

==== 2012–2013 season ====
Uno finished 6th at his Junior Grand Prix in Slovenia. At his next JGP event in Germany, he won the silver medal with personal bests in both programs and a total score of 188.48 points. He finished 7th at the 2013 World Junior Championships.

==== 2013–2014 season: Senior international debut ====
Uno competed in his third JGP season, winning the bronze medal in Riga, Latvia, and placing 4th in Tallinn, Estonia. He placed 5th at the 2014 World Junior Championships and won his first international senior competition at the 2014 Gardena Spring Trophy.

==== 2014–2015 season: World Junior champion ====
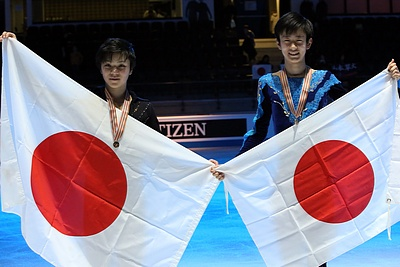
Uno (left) with teammate Sōta Yamamoto at the 2015 World Junior Championships

Uno began his season by winning his second senior international competition at the 2014 Asian Trophy. He was assigned to the JGP events in Japan and Croatia. He placed second in Japan and first in Croatia with new personal best scores and qualified for his first JGP Final. He won his first junior national title at the 2014–15 Japan Junior Championships. The following month, he won gold at the JGP Final, placing third in the short program and winning the free skate while setting junior world records for the free skate and combined total. At the 2014–15 Japan Championships, he placed 3rd in both segments of the competition, winning the silver medal.

Uno made his senior ISU Championship debut at the 2015 Four Continents; he placed second in the short program, fifth in the free skate, and fifth overall, setting personal best scores in all segments. He ended his season by winning the 2015 World Junior Championships, winning the short program with a junior world record score of 84.87, and placing second in the free skate. He became the fifth Japanese man to win the junior world title. As the junior worlds champion, Uno was invited to skate in the gala at the 2015 World Team Trophy.

=== Senior career ===
==== 2015–2016 season: First quad flip in international competition ====
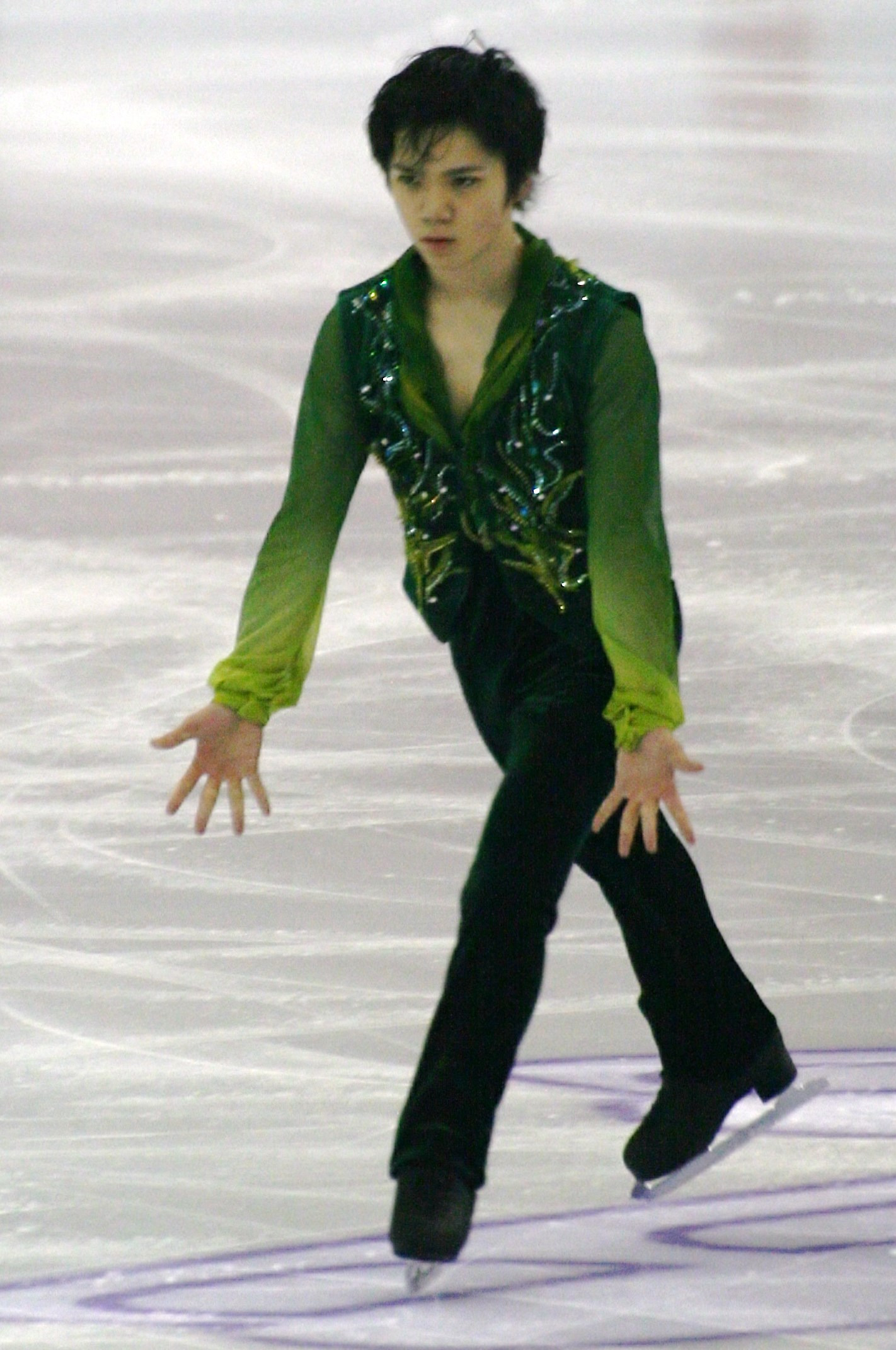
Uno at the 2015–16 Grand Prix Final

Uno started his season with a 5th-place finish at the 2015 U.S. Classic, placing 9th in the short program but winning the free skate. He then went on to win the individual event of the 2015 Japan Open, defeating World champions Javier Fernandez, Brian Joubert and Patrick Chan.

Making his senior Grand Prix debut, Uno won the silver medal at 2015 Skate America after placing fourth in the short program and first in the free program, finishing only 1.52 points behind gold medalist Max Aaron. Uno then made some training changes, saying, "During Skate America, I felt that I lacked a bit of stamina, so I increased the number of run-throughs in training every day and started to do off-ice stamina training." He placed first in the short program at the 2015 Trophée Éric Bompard. Due to the November 2015 Paris attacks, the free skate was cancelled, and the short program standings were deemed the final results. Uno thus became the winner of the event and qualified for the 2015–16 Grand Prix Final in Barcelona. He was awarded the bronze medal in Spain behind Yuzuru Hanyu and Fernández.

After repeating as the national silver medalist, Uno finished fourth behind Patrick Chan, Jin Boyang and Yan Han at the 2016 Four Continents Championships, having ranked second to Jin in the short program and fifth in the free skate. At the 2016 World Championships in Boston, he placed 4th in the short program, 6th in the long, and 7th overall. At the 2016 Team Challenge Cup, Uno became the first skater ever to land a quadruple flip at an international competition. He landed two quads in his short program, 4F and 4T-3T combination, and scored a personal best of 105.74 points.

==== 2016–2017 season: First national title, World silver medal ====
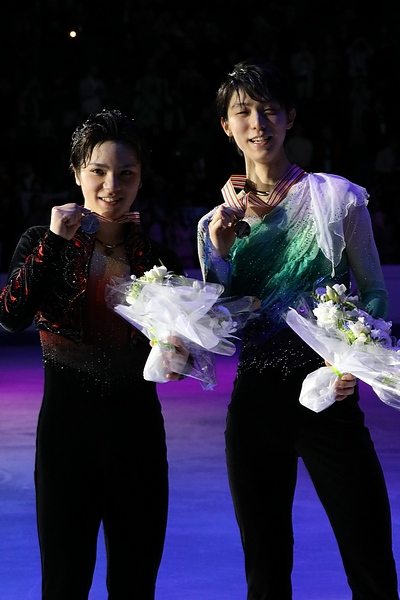
Uno (left) and Yuzuru Hanyu at the 2017 World Championships

In December 2016, Uno was fourth in the short program with 86.82 points after falling on his quadruple toe loop and failing the combination in the Grand Prix Final. He rallied back in the free skate with a personal best of 195.69 points and placed second in that segment. He placed third overall and won the bronze medal for the second consecutive year, just 0.34 points behind silver medalist Nathan Chen and 11.39 points behind gold medalist Yuzuru Hanyu. Later that month, he won his first national title in Osaka, Japan.

In February, he broke the hundred-point barrier with a score of 100.28 in the short program for the first time in his career at the Four Continents Championships, being the fourth person to do so. In the free skate, he landed four quad jumps, including his first ever quad loop in international competition and a quad flip, but fell on both his triple axel combinations. He placed 2nd in the short program, 3rd in the free skate and won the bronze medal with a score of 288.05 behind Nathan Chen and Yuzuru Hanyu.

At the 2017 World Figure Skating Championships in Helsinki, he set new personal best scores for both the short program with a score of 104.86 and free skate with a score of 214.45, earning the silver medal with the fourth-ever highest combined score of 319.31, just 2.28 points behind World Champion Yuzuru Hanyu and 15.73 points ahead of bronze medalist Jin Boyang. At the final competition of this season, the World Team Trophy in Tokyo, he was able to win a gold medal for Japan with his teammates. He won the short program with 103.53 points and placed second behind teammate Yuzuru Hanyu in the free skate with 198.49 points. He scored a total of 302.02 points, the highest in the men's event.

==== 2017–2018 season: Olympic silver medal ====
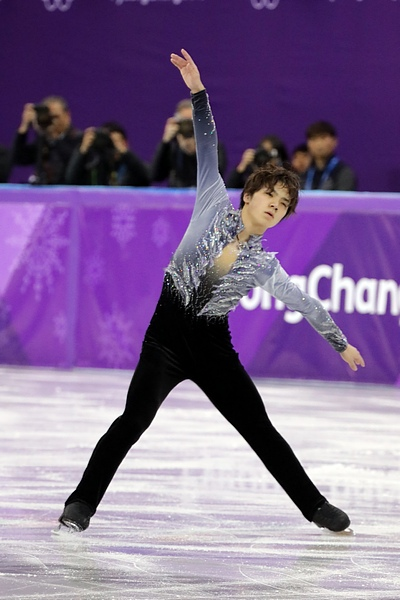
Uno at the 2018 Winter Olympics

Uno began his season by winning the gold medal at his challenger series event at the 2017 Lombardia Trophy in Bergamo, Italy while setting new personal bests in all segments. At the 2017 Japan Open, he won the silver medal with his teammates. Uno won the gold medal at 2017 Skate Canada, placing first in both segments to begin his Grand Prix Series for the season. After returning from the competition on 31 October, Uno developed a 39-degree high fever and was diagnosed with influenza. In his following competition at 2017 Internationaux de France, he placed second in the short program and first in the free skate to place second overall behind Javier Fernandez. His results qualified him for his third consecutive senior Grand Prix Final, where he won the silver medal only 0.5 points behind Nathan Chen.

At the 2017 Japan Figure Skating Championships, Uno successfully defended his national title. On 24 December 2017, it was announced that Uno would represent Japan at the 2018 Four Continents Figure Skating Championships in Taipei City, Chinese Taipei, 2018 Winter Olympics in Pyeongchang, South Korea, and 2018 World Figure Skating Championships in Milan, Italy. Placing third in the short program and third in the free skate, Uno took silver at the 2018 Winter Olympics, 1.66 points ahead of bronze medallist Javier Fernández of Spain.

At the 2018 World Figure Skating Championships in Milan, Uno had to leave practice only after a few minutes on ice and was carried to a bus on a staff member's back. Upon examination, no serious injury was found; his skates caused his pain. However, it was decided that Uno would still compete in the competition. Uno scored 94.26 in the short program, and 179.51 in the free skate, with a total score of 273.77, earning him the silver medal. His result, together with that of Kazuki Tomono, secured three spots for Japanese men at the 2019 World Figure Skating Championships to be held in Saitama, Japan.

==== 2018–2019 season: Four Continents champion ====
Uno started the season at the 2018 CS Lombardia Trophy, where he won the event. At 2018 Japan Open, he won the men's free program and won the gold medal as a member of Team Japan. In October, he won his first GP event of the season 2018 Skate Canada International. In November, he won his second GP event of the season, the 2018 NHK Trophy. He qualified to the 2018–19 Grand Prix Final and placed second, 5.99 points behind Nathan Chen. At the 2018 Japan Figure Skating Championships, Uno successfully defended his national title, winning by a margin of almost 50 points. This was his third successive national title, despite spraining his right ankle during the competition. He was named to the team to represent Japan at the 2019 Four Continents Championships and the 2019 World Championships.

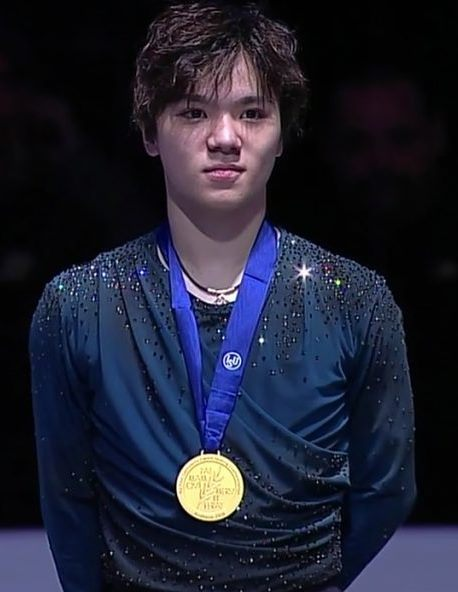
Uno at the 2019 Four Continents Championships podium

At the 2019 Four Continents Championships, Uno came fourth in the short program, first in the free skate, and first overall. This marked the first time he won a major international competition after having placed silver at all of them at least once. He set a world record for the free skate with a score of 197.36. At the 2019 World Championships in Saitama, Uno was sixth in the short program, fourth in the free skate, and fourth overall. After the competition, he expressed disappointment with his performances. He concluded the season at the 2019 World Team Trophy, placing third in the short program, third in the free skate, and third overall. In the free skate, he attempted a triple Axel-quadruple toe loop combination, becoming the first skater to attempt this combination in competition, although he was unable to land it successfully. Team Japan won the silver medal.

On 6 June 2019, Uno announced on his website that he would no longer be coached by Machiko Yamada and Mihoko Higuchi, who had coached him since he was five years old, and that he did not yet know who his new coaches would be. On 7 June, Russian coach Eteri Tutberidze announced that Uno would be attending her summer camp. Following Tutberidze's camp, which he described as "tough" but a "good experience", Uno announced that he would not have a main coach in the near term, but Takeshi Honda would serve as a jump coach. He also announced plans to visit Stéphane Lambiel's Swiss training facility in September 2019.

==== 2019–2020 season: Coaching change, struggles, and fourth Japanese title ====
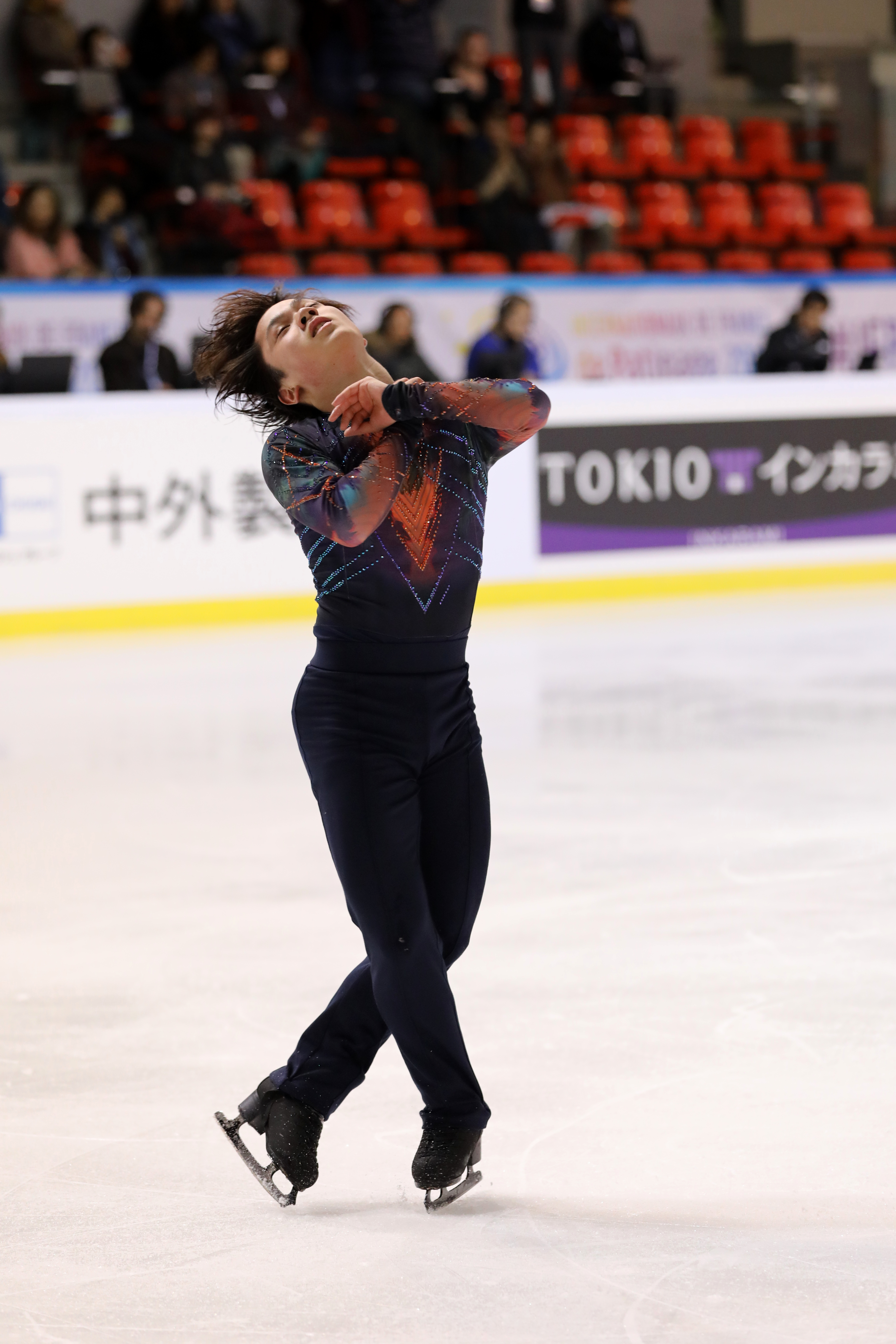
Uno performing an upright spin in his short program at the Internationaux de France

Uno began the season at the 2019 CS Finlandia Trophy. He narrowly placed second in the short program behind countryman Sōta Yamamoto but came first in the free skate to take the gold medal. Beginning the Grand Prix at the 2019 Internationaux de France, Uno placed fourth in the short program after falling on both his triple Axel and a quad toe loop attempt that was meant to be in combination. In the free skate, he fell three times and had errors on two other quad jump attempts, causing him to place ninth in the free skate and fall to eighth overall. This was his worst-ever result at a senior international competition. Despite this, Uno stated that he had positive feelings about his situation and expressed gratitude to the audience for their cheers and support.

Uno spent the weeks between the Internationaux and his next assignment, the 2019 Rostelecom Cup, training with Stéphane Lambiel. He placed fourth in the short program, falling on an under-rotated quad flip, and described himself as "relieved" with the result. Fourth in the free skate as well, he remained in fourth overall, 0.63 points behind bronze medalist Makar Ignatov. Uno said it was "not a good result, but I feel that towards the end of the season, I'll be able to jump a quad flip." He announced he would train more in Switzerland before the Japanese championships.

Shortly before the 2019–20 Japan Figure Skating Championships, Uno confirmed that he would train full-time under Lambiel. He placed second in the short program behind Yuzuru Hanyu, who was competing at his first Japanese championships since the 2016–17 season. Uno then won the free skate and the gold medal overall, his first individual victory over Hanyu in his career. He then decided not to participate in the Four Continents Championships of 2020. Instead, he started in February at the Challenge Cup in the Netherlands, where he won the gold medal and scored 290.41 points overall. He was assigned to end the season at the World Championships in Montreal, but these were cancelled as a result of the coronavirus pandemic.

==== 2020–2021 season ====
Uno was assigned to compete at the 2020 Internationaux de France, but this event was also cancelled due to the pandemic. Returning to Japan for the 2020–21 Japan Championships, Uno placed third in the short program behind Yuzuru Hanyu and Yuma Kagiyama after failing to execute his planned jump combination. He was second in the free skate, his only error being tripling a planned quad toe loop, and he rose to the silver medal position overall, behind Hanyu.

At the 2021 World Championships, Uno placed sixth in the short program after a fall on his triple Axel. In the free skate, he two-footed his quadruple Salchow and put a hand down for his quadruple toe loop but still managed to place third in the free skate and fourth overall, behind Nathan Chen and compatriots Hanyu and Kagiyama. Uno was subsequently announced as part of the Japanese team for the 2021 World Team Trophy. He placed ninth in the short program and sixth in the free program, with Team Japan placing third overall at the competition.

==== 2021–2022 season: Beijing Olympics and World title ====
Uno made his season international competitive debut at the 2021 Skate America, his first Grand Prix. He placed second in the short program behind Vincent Zhou despite doubling a planned quad flip, in the process landing a quad-triple combination in competition for the first time in years. He was third in the free skate but remained in the silver medal position, less than a point ahead of bronze medalist Nathan Chen, who struggled in both programs. Zhou and Uno became the first and only skaters to defeat Chen in competition since the prior Olympics. His second assignment was the 2021 NHK Trophy, which, due to the withdrawal of Yuzuru Hanyu due to injury, was widely seen as a rematch between Uno and Zhou. Uno won both segments of the competition to defeat Zhou by almost thirty points. He landed four of his five planned quad jumps in the free skate, albeit with an imperfect landing on one, and doubled a planned quad flip. Uno's results qualified him to the Grand Prix Final, but it was subsequently cancelled due to restrictions prompted by the Omicron variant.

At the 2021–22 Japan Championships, Uno placed second in the short program and third in the free skate to take the silver medal behind Yuzuru Hanyu. He was named to his second Japanese Olympic team. Uno began the Games as the Japanese entry in the men's short program of the Olympic team event, as he had done four years earlier. Skating cleanly, he placed second behind the United States' Chen with a new personal best of 105.46, securing nine points for the Japanese team. Longtime coach Stéphane Lambiel was unable to accompany him as he had tested positive for COVID-19 and remained in Switzerland. Team Japan would go on to take the bronze medal, its first in the team competition and Uno's second Olympic medal. Two days later, Uno placed third in the short program of the men's event, managing another new personal best of 105.90 despite making an error on his jump combination. A somewhat rougher free skate saw him place fifth in that segment, but remain in third overall, taking the bronze, his third Olympic medal.

Uno concluded his season at the 2022 World Championships in Montpellier. With both Chen and Hanyu absent due to injury, Olympic medalists Uno and Yuma Kagiyama were rated as top contenders for the gold medal. Uno skated a clean short program and was rewarded with a personal best score of 109.63 and first place in the segment, 3.94 points ahead of Kagiyama. Uno made two jump errors in the free skate, but easily won that segment and the World title, becoming the third Japanese man to do so. He said afterward, "I wanted to have a performance that made my coach Stephane Lambiel proud. I was able to achieve that, and I haven't won too often, so I'm very happy about that."

==== 2022–2023 season: Grand Prix Final gold and second World title ====
Eschewing the Challenger series, Uno made his season debut as part of Team Japan at the Japan Open. Uno finished first in the men's free skate competition, 0.38 points ahead of American Ilia Malinin, while Japan won the gold medal. Uno praised the younger Malinin, who had recently attracted considerable media attention for being the first ever to land a quad Axel, saying that he "will be devastating in a year or two" and that he hoped to be able to keep up with him. Uno once again began the Grand Prix at Skate Canada International, winning his third gold medal by a margin of almost eight points over Kao Miura. At the 2022 NHK Trophy on home ice in Sapporo, Uno fell on his attempted jump combination and placed second in the short program, behind Sōta Yamamoto. He rallied in the free skate, overtaking Yamamoto to win his third NHK title. Despite this, he expressed dissatisfaction with his performance due to both jump errors and some omitted choreographic details.

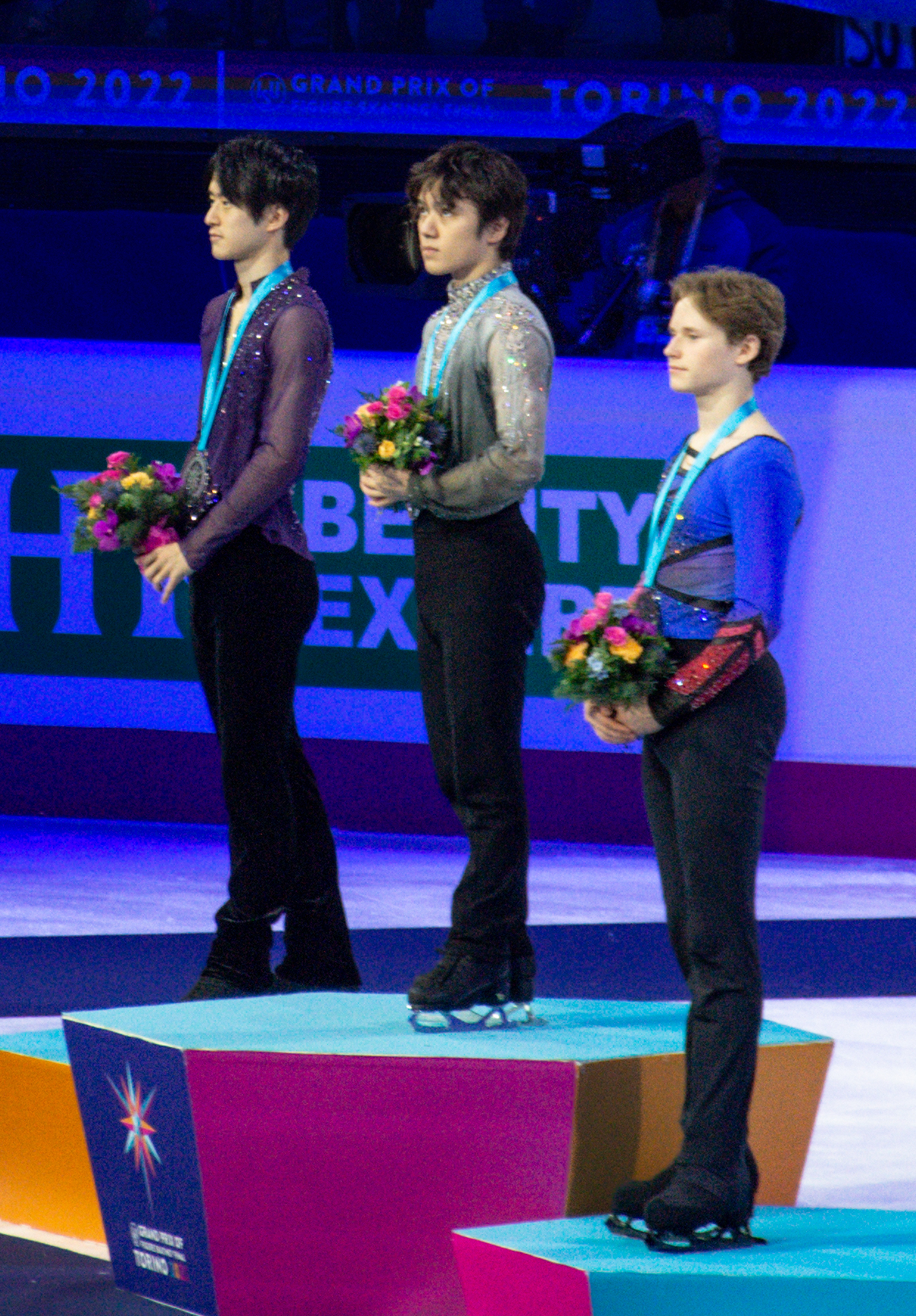
Uno on the Grand Prix Final podium with Sōta Yamamoto (left) and Ilia Malinin (right)

Uno to the Grand Prix Final once again, and he finished first in the short program in Turin despite performing only a quad-double jump combination. He won the free skate with a new personal best score, landing five quadruple jumps successfully and winning the Grand Prix Final title for the first time and completing his first Career Grand Slam. He claimed that he "didn't particularly feel pressure just because I won the World Championship, but at this competition, especially during the free program, all the other skaters did so amazing that instead, it motivated me to enjoy and do my best for my competition." He vowed to continue improvements, and in particular to resume performing quad-triple combinations.

Uno finished in first place in the short program of the men's event at the 2022–23 Japan Championships. Despite performing only a quad-double jump combination, he had a lead of almost thirteen points over training partner Koshiro Shimada, who was second in the segment. He attempted five quads in the free skate, cleanly landing three, winning that segment as well and taking his fifth national title. Uno attracted some attention afterward for criticizing the lack of transparency in the Japanese federation's criteria for awarding berths to the World Championships, interpreted by the media as a reference to Shimada not being selected despite winning the national silver medal.

Despite dealing with an ankle injury in the leadup to the 2023 World Championships in Saitama, Uno won the short program with a score of 104.63, performing only a quad-double as his jump combination. Uno won the free skate as well, winning his second consecutive gold medal at the World Championships. He was the first man from Japan to win back-to-back world titles since 1896. Uno was initially assigned to the Japanese team for the 2023 World Team Trophy, but withdrew due to his ongoing ankle problems, and was replaced by Shun Sato.

==== 2023–2024 season ====
Uno did not appear on the Challenger circuit, instead making his season debut on the Grand Prix at the 2023 Cup of China. He won the short program with a clean skate, but after falling on one quad attempt and doubling another he finished second in the free skate and dropped to second overall, behind reigning European champion Adam Siao Him Fa. Despite the errors, he said he was "satisfied" with the performance, having "got fulfillment with the presentation," while also vowing to work to improve his jumping for subsequent events. He went on to win another silver medal at the 2023 NHK Trophy, winning the free skate over Yuma Kagiyama but falling short of overtaking him by less than two points. All of his quadruple jumps in the free skate were deemed a quarter short of rotation, and he also received a time violation.

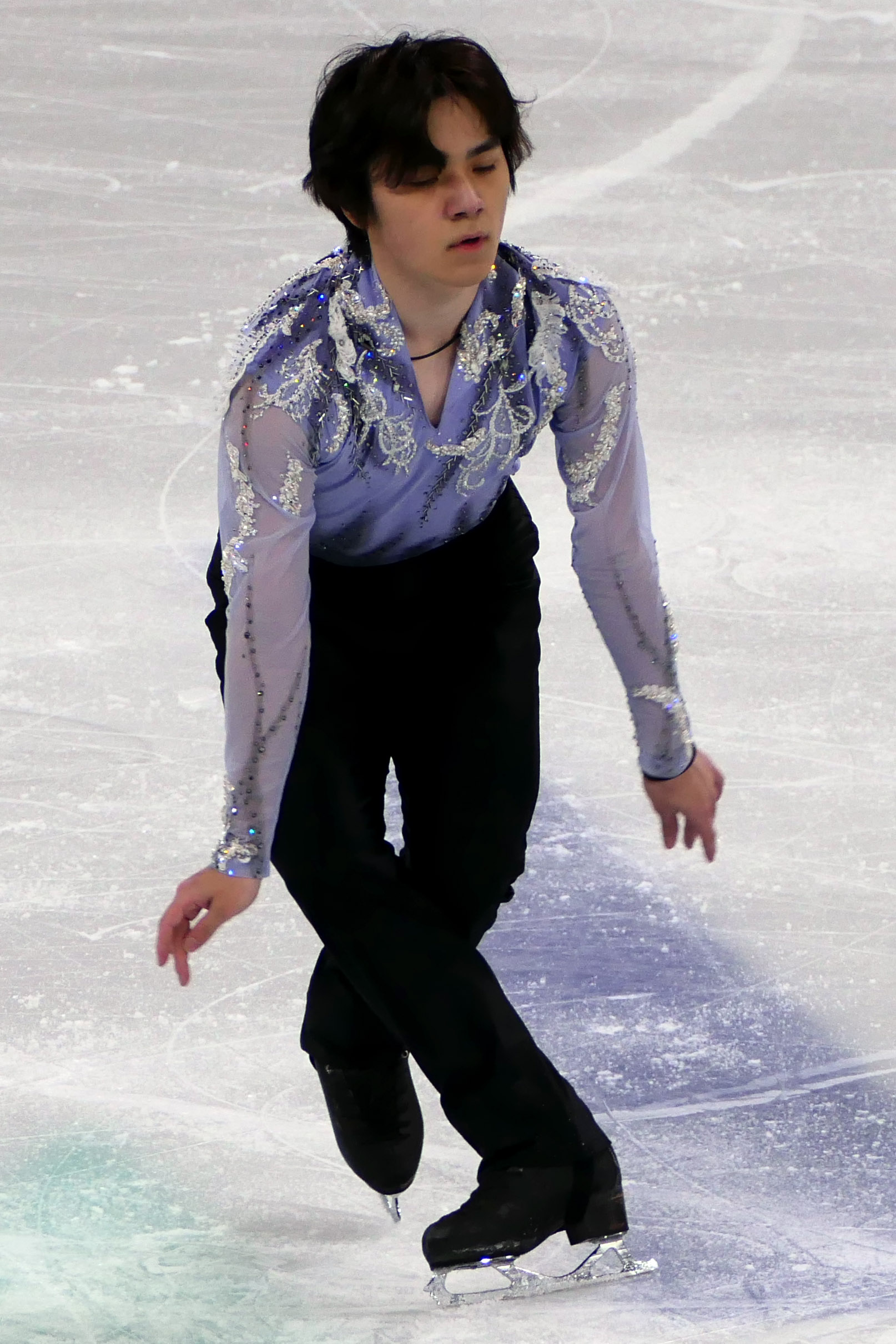
Uno during his short program at the 2024 World Championships

At the 2023–24 Grand Prix Final, Uno skated a clean short program and scored 106.02, finishing second in the segment and only 0.88 points behind American Ilia Malinin. He was second in the free skate as well, despite again receiving several quarter underrotation marks and singling a planned triple Axel, winning another silver medal, but finishing more than 17 points behind Malinin in total score. Despite this, Uno said he was "quite happy" with how the Grand Prix season had gone.

In an interview after the 2023–24 Grand Prix Final, Uno talked about his challenges and motivation, admitting that his enthusiasm for the sport "didn't match" those of others, but that various coaches helped him. "That's why, although I do respect Stéphane's skating, I really like his personality," he said. "In the case of figure skating coaches, this was the same as Coach Mihoko as well. Rather than it being all about business, I want to feel the love. To be able to feel the kindness they have for their students. I am pulled in by that."

Uno entered the 2023–24 Japan Championships as the title favourite, and won the short program with a clean skate. His score of 104.69 points was more than ten points ahead of second-place Sōta Yamamoto. In the free skate his quad loop attempt was deemed a quarter short of rotation, and he finished second in the segment to Kagiyama, but remained comfortably in first place due to his short program lead and won his sixth national title.

Concluding the season at the 2024 World Championships in Montreal, Uno won the short program with a clean skate and a season's best score of 107.72. The free skate proved to be more difficult, as he fell on his opening quad loop and made several other jump errors. He came sixth in that segment and dropped to fourth place overall, missing the bronze medal by 3.54 points to Siao Him Fa. Uno remarked afterward that it "would have been nice if the event would have ended after the short program, then I would be fully satisfied." He indicated that he was undecided whether he would continue competing the following season.

Uno announced his retirement from competitive skating on his Instagram account on May 9, 2024 and held a press conference regarding his decision on 14 May 2024.

=== Hiatus: 2024–2026 ===
In 2023, during the off-season, Uno was cast to play the lead role of Monkey D. Luffy for the summer ice show One Piece on Ice He would appear in Stéphane Lambiel's production of The Sorcerer's Apprentice in Champéry, Switzerland, in August 2024, and reprised his role as Monkey D. Luffy in One Piece shows that took place in September 2024.

During the 2024 Paris Olympics, a medal ceremony was organized for Uno and his teammates from the 2022 Olympic Figure Skating Team Event to receive their Olympic silver medals. Although Uno was unable to attend the ceremony due to scheduling conflicts, he expressed happiness that his teammates would have a ceremony to attend. Uno's Team Event Olympic silver medal was eventually delivered to him. During the gala exhibition at the 2024 NHK Trophy, all members of the 2022 Olympic Team Event, including Uno, were invited to center stage, wearing their Olympic costumes and Olympic medals, in celebration of their achievement.

From June 2025 to February 2026, Uno produced and completed his first self-produced ice show, titled Ice Brave. The first edition of Ice Brave premiered at Aichi, Uno's home prefecture, before continuing to Fukuoka and Niigata. The cast of Ice Brave includes fellow Japanese professional skaters Marin Honda and Rika Hongo as well as the members of Prince Ice World, with Uno's coach Stéphane Lambiel participating as the show's only guest skater. The second edition continued without Lambiel to Kyoto, Tokyo, Yamanashi, Shimane and Miyagi, before ending in a special edition in Shin-Yokohama. The show runs for 90 minutes non-stop without any ice cut intermission or pre-shot video footage, utilizing music used for Uno's programs during his competitive career except for a new street dance-inspired group program and Uno and Honda's new programs. For this show, Uno and Honda changed their figure skating blades to a specific model designed by Japanese steel and skating blade company YS Blades for ice dance, and performed to Roberto Cacciapaglia's Wild Side choreographed by Kenji Miyamoto, and Max Richter's re-composition of Antonio Vivaldi's The Four Seasons, choreographed by Jean-Luc Baker.

=== Ice dance with Marin Honda ===
==== Partnership formation ====
Following his retirement from singles skating, Uno approached his girlfriend and retired women's singles skater, Marin Honda, suggesting that he and her take on the challenge of learning how to ice dance together. Uno later shared that the idea came to him due to his desire for more people to witness Honda's expressiveness as a skater. "I had no regrets about singles," he said. "However, I think people don't fully understand how wonderful Marin's skating is." Following a period of deliberation, Honda agreed to the idea and the partnership officially formed in October 2024. Honda/Uno first debuted as a team in June 2025 during "Ice Brave," a show that was organized by Uno.

In March 2026, Honda/Uno received additional training at the Ice Academy of Montréal.

==== 2026–2027 season ====
On May 22, 2026, Honda/Uno announced their plans to pursue ice dance competitively with the goal of competing at the 2030 Winter Olympics. "We chose to begin in the 2026 season because of our strong desire to seriously pursue the 2030 Winter Olympics as competitors," Uno said. Additionally, Honda/Uno stated that they did not yet have an official coaching team and as a result, Uno's longtime singles skating coach, Stéphane Lambiel, would accompany them to competitions.

== Public life ==
=== Sponsorships, endorsements and partnerships ===
Uno has had many endorsement contracts throughout his career that includes an affiliate sponsorship deal with car manufacturer Toyota that was announced in early June 2017. Other notable partnerships include healthcare consumer brand Colantotte, sports equipment and activewear company Mizuno, and cosmetics manufacturer DHC.

=== Books and magazines ===
In March 2018, Uno released a 96-page photo book entitled Shoma Uno New Hero: Path to the Silver Medal published by Kodansha. The photo book chronicles Uno's journey at the 2018 Winter Olympics in PyeongChang where he placed second. He has released two official calendars in 2018 and 2020 respectively.

== Personal life and education ==
Uno attended Chukyo High School and Chukyo University in Nagoya. Looking back at his high school years, Uno later described himself as a quiet student who enjoyed playing games on his smartphone with his classmates during recess. In September 2022, Uno confirmed he was in a relationship with Japanese figure skater, Marin Honda.

== Records and achievements ==
- First skater in history to successfully land a quadruple flip jump at the 2016 Team Challenge Cup. This achievement is recognized by Guinness World Records.
- Became the first Japanese Figure skater to win three Olympic Medals at the 2022 Beijing Olympics,
- Set the junior-level men's record for the short program score with 84.87 points at the 2015 Junior Worlds.
- Set the junior-level men's record for the combined total with 238.27 points at the 2014–15 Junior Grand Prix Final. Record was broken by Cha Jun-hwan at the 2016 JGP Japan.
- Set the junior-level men's record for the free program score with 163.06 points at the 2014–15 Junior Grand Prix Final. Record was broken by Daniel Samohin at the 2016 World Junior Championships.
- Set the men's record for the short program score with 104.15 points at the 2018 CS Lombardia Trophy. Record was broken by Yuzuru Hanyu at the 2018 Grand Prix of Helsinki.
- Set the men's record for the combined total with 276.20 points at the 2018 CS Lombardia Trophy. Record was broken by Nathan Chen at the 2018 Skate America.
- Set the men's record for the free program score with 197.36 points at the 2019 Four Continents Championships. Record was broken by Yuzuru Hanyu at the 2019 World Championships.

== Honors and awards ==
- Japan Skating Federation: "JOC Cup" (2019)
- Chunichi Shimbun: 33rd "Chunichi Sports Award" (2019)
- TV Asahi: "Big Sports Awards" Big Sports Special Award (2017, 2018)
- Aichi "Sports Awards" (2017, 2018)
- Nagoya "Sports Awards" (2018, 2023)
- Toyota, Aichi "Sports Awards" (2022)

== Programs ==
=== Ice dance with Marin Honda ===
Competition and exhibition programs by season
Season	Rhythm dance program	Free dance program	Exhibition program
2026–27	"Poeta": Composed by Vicente Amigo; Choreo. by Kenji Miyamoto	The Four Seasons: Composed by Antonio Vivaldi; Performed by Max Richter; Choreo. by Jean-Luc Baker	—N/a

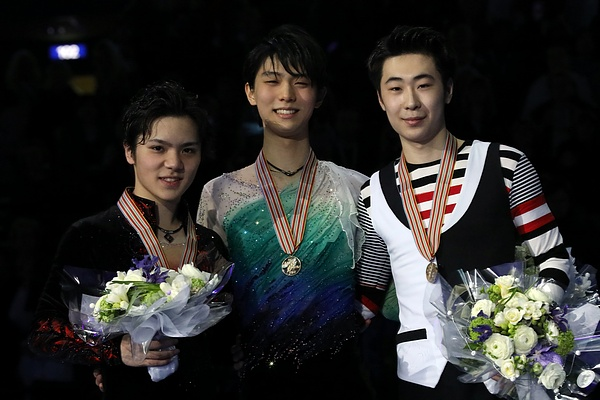
Uno (left) at the 2017 World Championships podium

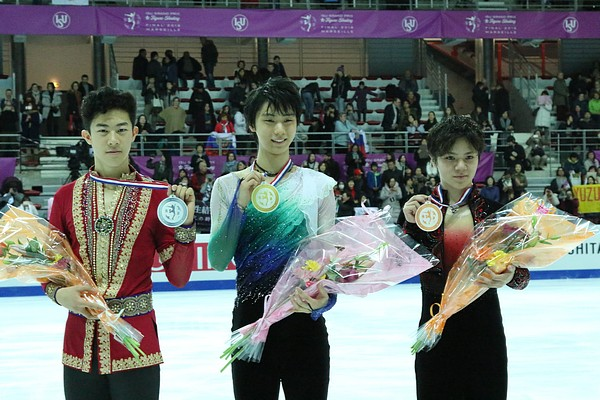
Uno (right) at the 2016–17 Grand Prix Final podium

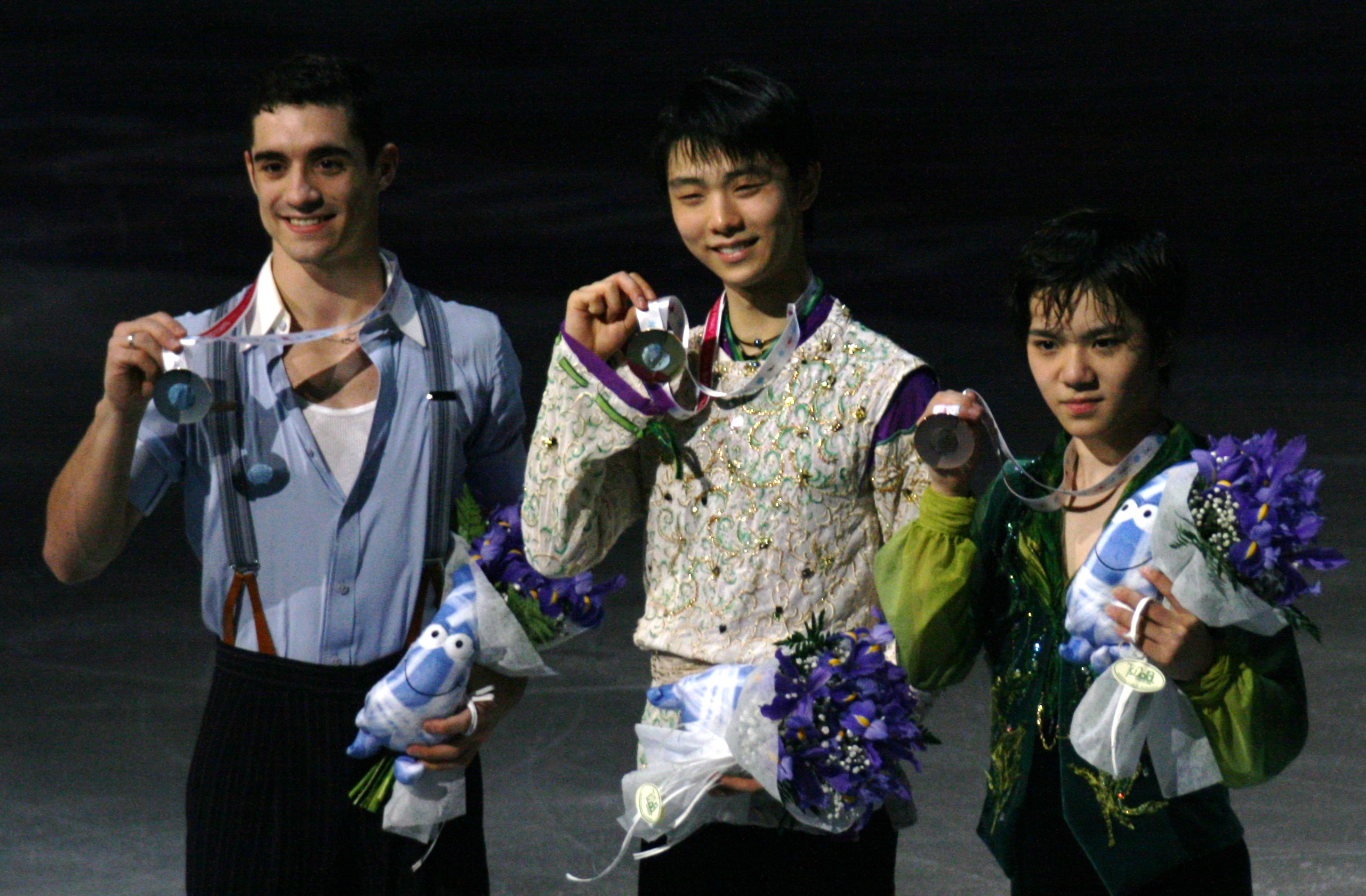
Uno (right) at the 2015–16 Grand Prix Final podium

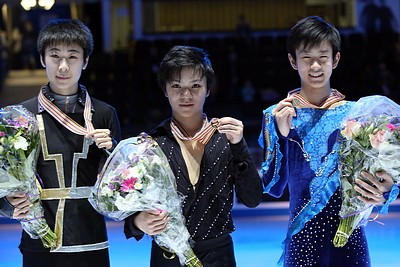
Uno (center) at the 2015 World Junior Championships podium

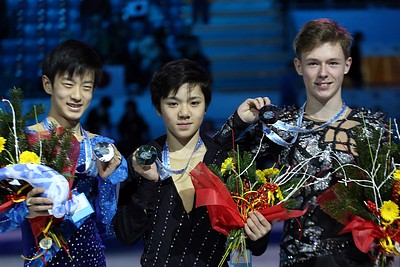
Uno (center) at the 2014–15 Junior Grand Prix Final podium

=== Singles skating ===
Competition and exhibition programs by season
Season	Short program	Free skate program	Exhibition program
2010–11	—N/a	Tzigane: Composed by Maurice Ravel; Choreo. by Mihoko Higuchi & Machiko Yamada	"Fly Me to the Moon"
2011–12	Tucker: Composed by Joe Jackson; Choreo. by Mihoko Higuchi & Machiko Yamada	Tzigane	—N/a
2012–2013	"Tanguera": Composed by Mariano Mores; Choreo. by Mihoko Higuchi & Machiko Yamada	"Steps": Composed by Secret Garden; Choreo. by Mihoko Higuchi & Machiko Yamada	"Bad Boy Good Man": Performed by Tape Five
2013–2014	"The Blessed Spirits": Performed by Vanessa-Mae; Choreo. by Mihoko Higuchi & Machiko Yamada	"Steps"	"Tanguera"
2014–2015	"Violin Sonata No.9": Composed by Ludwig van Beethoven; Choreo. by Mihoko Higuchi	"Don Juan DeMarco": Composed by Michael Kamen; Choreo. by Mihoko Higuchi	"The Blessed Spirits"
2015–2016	"Legends": Composed by Sacred Spirit; Choreo. by Mihoko Higuchi	Turandot: 1. Violin Fantasy on Puccini's Turandot; Performed by Vanessa-Mae; 2. Nessun dorma; Performed by Paul Potts; Choreo. by Mihoko Higuchi	Violin Sonata No.9
2015–2016	"Legends": Composed by Sacred Spirit; Choreo. by Mihoko Higuchi	Turandot: 1. Violin Fantasy on Puccini's Turandot; Performed by Vanessa-Mae; 2. Nessun dorma; Performed by Paul Potts; Choreo. by Mihoko Higuchi	Don Juan DeMarco
2016–2017	"Fantasy for Violin and Orchestra": From Ladies in Lavender; Composed by Joshua Bell; Choreo. by Mihoko Higuchi	"Astor Piazzolla Medley": 1. Buenos Aires Hora Cero; Performed by Gidon Kremer; 2. Balada para un loco; Performed by Milva; Composed by Astor Piazzolla; Choreo. by Mihoko Higuchi	"See You Again": Performed by Wiz Khalifa ft. Charlie Puth; Choreo. by Mihoko Higuchi
2016–2017	"Fantasy for Violin and Orchestra": From Ladies in Lavender; Composed by Joshua Bell; Choreo. by Mihoko Higuchi	"Astor Piazzolla Medley": 1. Buenos Aires Hora Cero; Performed by Gidon Kremer; 2. Balada para un loco; Performed by Milva; Composed by Astor Piazzolla; Choreo. by Mihoko Higuchi	"La Vie en rose": Performed by Andrea Bocelli, Édith Piaf; Choreo. by Stéphane Lambiel
2016–2017	"Fantasy for Violin and Orchestra": From Ladies in Lavender; Composed by Joshua Bell; Choreo. by Mihoko Higuchi	"Astor Piazzolla Medley": 1. Buenos Aires Hora Cero; Performed by Gidon Kremer; 2. Balada para un loco; Performed by Milva; Composed by Astor Piazzolla; Choreo. by Mihoko Higuchi	"This Town": Performed by Niall Horan & Jamie Scott; Choreo. by David Wilson
2017–2018	"Winter": From The Four Seasons; Composed by Antonio Vivaldi; Performed by Michel Schwalbé, Herbert von Karajan, & Berlin Philharmonic; Choreo. by Mihoko Higuchi & Stéphane Lambiel	Turandot	"See You Again"
2017–2018	"Winter": From The Four Seasons; Composed by Antonio Vivaldi; Performed by Michel Schwalbé, Herbert von Karajan, & Berlin Philharmonic; Choreo. by Mihoko Higuchi & Stéphane Lambiel	Turandot	"This Town"
2018–2019	"Stairway to Heaven": Composed by Led Zeppelin; Performed by Rodrigo y Gabriela; Choreo. by Mihoko Higuchi	"Moonlight Sonata": Composed by Ludwig van Beethoven; Performed by Vladimir Ashkenazy; Choreo. by Mihoko Higuchi & Stéphane Lambiel	"Great Spirit": Performed by Armin van Buuren, Vini Vici, & Hilight Tribe; Choreo. by Shae-Lynn Bourne
2018–2019	"Stairway to Heaven": Composed by Led Zeppelin; Performed by Rodrigo y Gabriela; Choreo. by Mihoko Higuchi	"Moonlight Sonata": Composed by Ludwig van Beethoven; Performed by Vladimir Ashkenazy; Choreo. by Mihoko Higuchi & Stéphane Lambiel	"Time After Time": Performed by Harry Connick Jr.; Choreo. by David Wilson
2018–2019	"Stairway to Heaven": Composed by Led Zeppelin; Performed by Rodrigo y Gabriela; Choreo. by Mihoko Higuchi	"Moonlight Sonata": Composed by Ludwig van Beethoven; Performed by Vladimir Ashkenazy; Choreo. by Mihoko Higuchi & Stéphane Lambiel	"See You Again"
2018–2019	"Winter"	—N/a	—N/a
2019–2020	"Great Spirit"	Medley: 1. Our Life (Finale); Performed by Brock Hewitt; 2. Dancing on My Own; Composed by Robyn; Performed by Calum Scott; 3. Your Last Kiss; Composed by Karl Hugo; Choreo. by David Wilson	Medley: 1. Oboe Concerto; Composed by Alessandro Marcello; 2. Concerto in C minor for Cello, Strings and Basso continuo, RV 401; Composed by Antonio Vivaldi; Performed by Yo-Yo Ma & Amsterdam Baroque Orchestra; Choreo. by Kenji Miyamoto
2019–2020	"Great Spirit"	Medley: 1. Our Life (Finale); Performed by Brock Hewitt; 2. Dancing on My Own; Composed by Robyn; Performed by Calum Scott; 3. Your Last Kiss; Composed by Karl Hugo; Choreo. by David Wilson	"See You Again"
2019–2020	"Great Spirit"	Medley: 1. Our Life (Finale); Performed by Brock Hewitt; 2. Dancing on My Own; Composed by Robyn; Performed by Calum Scott; 3. Your Last Kiss; Composed by Karl Hugo; Choreo. by David Wilson	"This Town"
2019–2020	"Great Spirit"	Medley: 1. Our Life (Finale); Performed by Brock Hewitt; 2. Dancing on My Own; Composed by Robyn; Performed by Calum Scott; 3. Your Last Kiss; Composed by Karl Hugo; Choreo. by David Wilson	"La Vie en rose"
2020–2021	"Great Spirit"	"Our Life", "Dancing On My Own", "Your Last Kiss"	Oboe Concerto
2020–2021	"Great Spirit"	"Our Life", "Dancing On My Own", "Your Last Kiss"	"See You Again"
2020–2021	"Great Spirit"	"Our Life", "Dancing On My Own", "Your Last Kiss"	"This Town"
2020–2021	"Great Spirit"	"Our Life", "Dancing On My Own", "Your Last Kiss"	"La Vie en rose"
2021–2022	Oboe Concerto	"Boléro": Composed by Maurice Ravel; Performed by Tomotaka Okamoto; Choreo. by Stéphane Lambiel	"Earth Song": Performed by Michael Jackson; Choreo. by Stéphane Lambiel
2022–2023	"Gravity": Performed by John Mayer; Choreo. by Stéphane Lambiel	Medley: 1. Air on the G String; Composed by Johann Sebastian Bach; 2. Mea tormenta, properate; Composed by Johann Adolph Hasse; Choreo. by Kenji Miyamoto	Padam, Padam: Composed by Édith Piaf; Performed by Patricia Kaas; Choreo. by Mihoko Higuchi
2023–2024	Medley: 1. I Love You Kung Fu; Composed by Son Lux; 2. Clair de Lune; Composed by Claude Debussy; From Everything Everywhere All at Once; Choreo. by Stéphane Lambiel	Medley: 1. "Timelapse"; Performed by Uno Helmersson, Mari Samuelsen, Jesper Soderqvist, Gunnar Flagstad, & Trondheim Soloists; 2. Spiegel im Spiegel; Composed by Arvo Pärt; Performed by Vladimir Spivakov, Sergej Bezrodny; Choreo. by Kenji Miyamoto	"Come Together": Composed by The Beatles; Performed by Gary Clark Jr. & Tom Holkenborg; Choreo. by Shae-Lynn Bourne

== Competitive highlights ==
=== Singles skating ===
- GP – Event of the ISU Grand Prix Series
- JGP – Event of the ISU Junior Grand Prix Series
- CS – Event of the ISU Challenger Series
- C – Event was cancelled
- WD – Withdrew from event
- Medals at team events are awarded for the team result only.

Competition placements at senior level
Season	2011–12	2012–13	2013–14	2014–15	2015–16	2016–17	2017–18	2018–19	2019–20	2020–21	2021–22	2022–23	2023–24
Winter Olympics							2nd				3rd		
Winter Olympics – Team event							5th				2nd		
World Championships					7th	2nd	2nd	4th	C	4th	1st	1st	4th
Four Continents				5th	4th	3rd	2nd	1st	WD	C			
GP Final					3rd	3rd	2nd	2nd			C	1st	2nd
GP Cup of China													2nd
GP France					1st		2nd		8th	C			
GP Rostelecom Cup						2nd			4th				
GP NHK Trophy								1st			1st	1st	2nd
GP Skate America					2nd	1st					2nd		
GP Skate Canada							1st	1st				1st	
CS Finlandia Trophy									1st				
CS Lombardia Trophy						1st	1st	1st					
CS U.S. Classic					5th								
Asian Winter Games						1st							
Asian Open				1st									
Challenge Cup									1st				
Coupe du Printemps						1st							
Gardena Spring Trophy			1st										
Japan Championships	9th	11th	7th	2nd	2nd	1st	1st	1st	1st	2nd	2nd	1st	1st
World Team Trophy						1st (1st)		2nd (3rd)		3rd (7th)		WD	

Competition placements at junior level
Season	2009–10	2010–11	2011–12	2012–13	2013–14	2014–15
Winter Youth Olympics			2nd			
Winter Youth Olympics – Team event			1st			
World Junior Championships			10th	7th	5th	1st
JGP Final						1st
JGP Croatia						1st
JGP Estonia			3rd		4th	
JGP Germany				2nd		
JGP Japan						2nd
JGP Latvia					3rd	
JGP Poland			4th			
JGP Slovenia				6th		
Japan Championships	3rd	4th	5th	2nd	2nd	1st

== Detailed results ==
=== Senior level in +3/-3 GOE system ===
Results in the 2015–16 season
Date	Event	SP		FS		Total	
Date	Event	P	Score	P	Score	P	Score
16–20 Sep 2015	(United States) 2015 U.S. International Classic	9	52.45	1	154.96	5	207.41
3 October 2015	2015 Japan Open	–	–	1	185.48	1	–
23–25 Oct 2015	(United States) 2015 Skate America	4	80.78	1	176.65	2	257.43
13 November 2015	(France) 2015 Trophée Éric Bompard (Note: Event cancelled due to the November 2015 Paris attacks)	1	89.56	C	–	1	–
10–13 Dec 2015	(Spain) 2015 Grand Prix Final	4	86.47	4	190.32	3	276.79
24–27 Dec 2015	2015–16 Japan Championships	2	97.94	3	169.21	2	267.15
16–21 Feb 2016	(Taiwan) 2016 Four Continents Championships	2	92.99	5	176.82	4	269.81
28–3 Mar April 2016	(United States) 2016 World Championships	4	90.74	6	173.51	7	264.25
22–24 Apr 2016	(United States) 2016 Team Challenge Cup	1	105.74	1	192.92	3 (1)	–

Results in the 2016–17 season
Date	Event	SP		FS		Total	
Date	Event	P	Score	P	Score	P	Score
8–11 Sep 2016	(Italy) 2016 CS Lombardia Trophy	1	86.68	2	172.25	1	258.93
1 October 2016	2016 Japan Open	–	–	1	198.55	1	–
21–23 Oct 2016	(United States) 2016 Skate America	1	89.15	1	190.19	1	279.34
4–6 Nov 2016	(Russia) 2016 Rostelecom Cup	1	98.59	2	186.48	2	285.07
8–11 Dec 2016	(France) 2016 Grand Prix Final	4	86.82	2	195.69	3	282.51
22–25 Dec 2016	2016–17 Japan Championships	2	88.05	1	192.36	1	280.41
14–19 Feb 2017	(South Korea) 2017 Four Continents Championships	2	100.28	3	187.77	3	288.05
23–26 Feb 2017	(Japan) 2017 Asian Winter Games	2	92.43	1	188.84	1	281.27
10–12 Mar, 2017	(Luxembourg) 2017 Coupe du Printemps	1	104.31	1	199.37	1	303.68
29–2 Mar April 2017	(Finland) 2017 World Championships	2	104.86	2	214.45	2	319.31
20–23 Apr, 2017	(Japan) 2021 World Team Trophy	1	103.53	2	198.49	1 (1)	302.02

Results in the 2017–18 season
Date	Event	SP		FS		Total	
Date	Event	P	Score	P	Score	P	Score
14–17 Sep 2017	(Italy) 2017 CS Lombardia Trophy	1	**104.87**	1	**214.97**	1	**319.84**
7 October 2017	2017 Japan Open	–	–	3	175.45	2	–
27–29 Oct 2017	2017 Skate Canada International	1	103.62	1	197.48	1	301.10
17–19 Nov 2017	2017 Internationaux de France	2	93.92	1	179.40	2	273.32
7–10 Dec, 2017	(Japan) 2017 Grand Prix Final	2	101.51	1	184.50	2	286.01
21–24 Dec 2017	2017–18 Japan Championships	1	96.83	1	186.47	1	283.30
22–28 Jan, 2018	(Taiwan) 2018 Four Continents Championships	1	100.49	2	197.45	2	297.94
9–11 Feb 2018	(South Korea) 2018 Winter Olympics – Team event	1	103.25	–	–	5	–
14–23 Feb 2018	(South Korea) 2018 Winter Olympics	3	104.17	3	202.73	2	306.90
19–25 Mar 2018	(Italy) 2018 World Championships	5	94.26	2	179.51	2	273.77

=== Senior level in +5/-5 GOE system ===
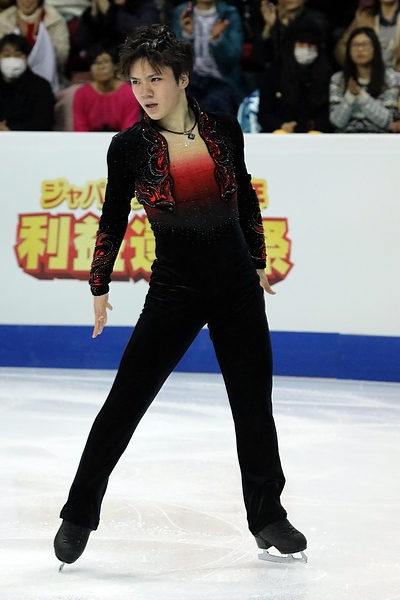
Uno at the 2016–17 Grand Prix Final

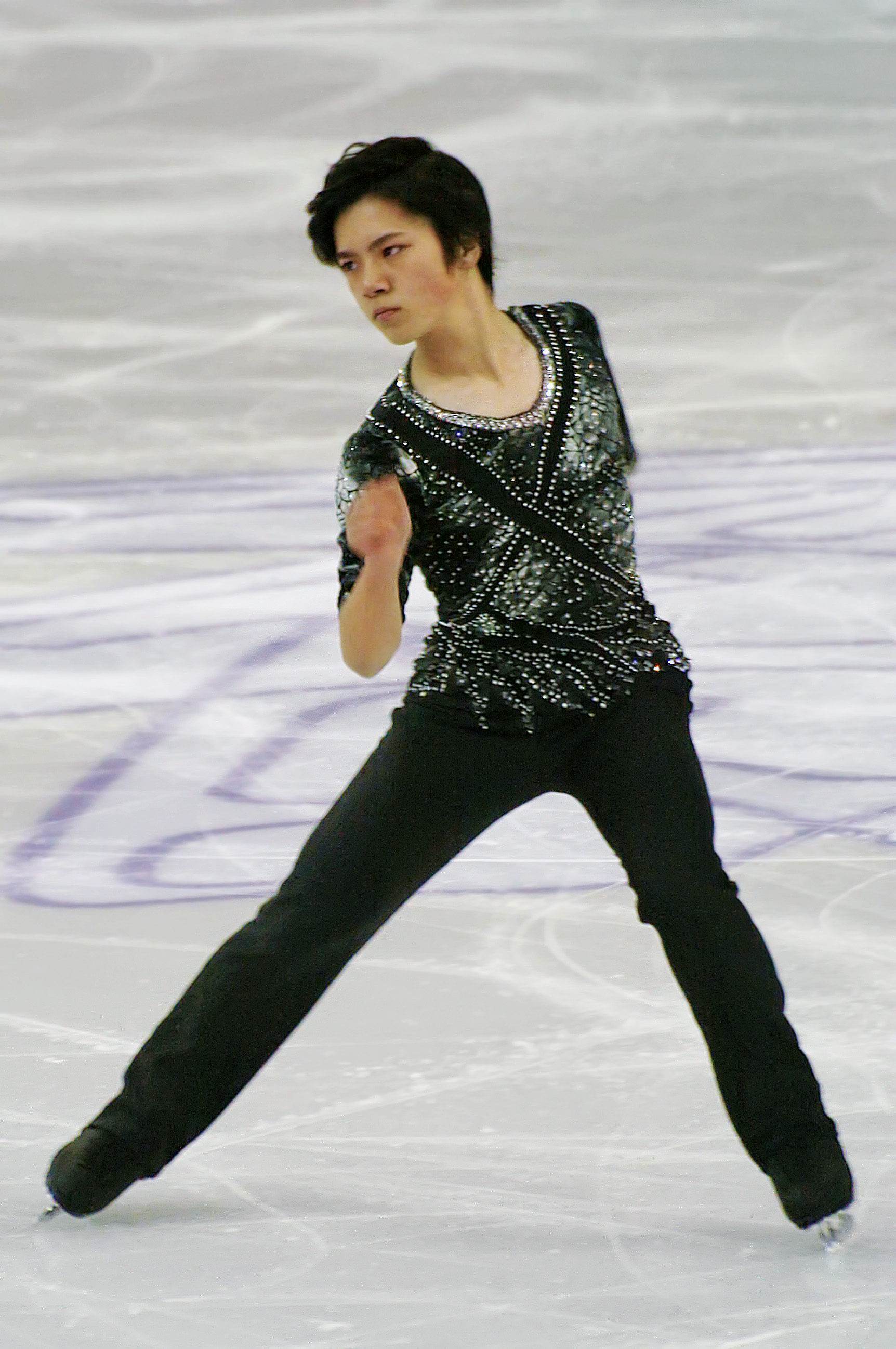
Uno at the 2015–16 Grand Prix Final

- Small medals for the short program and free skating are only awarded at ISU Championships.
- Medals at team events are awarded for the team result only. Individual placements in team events are listed in brackets.
- Personal bests are highlighted in **bold**.

Results in the 2018–19 season
Date	Event	SP		FS		Total	
Date	Event	P	Score	P	Score	P	Score
13–16 Sep 2018	(Italy) 2018 CS Lombardia Trophy	1	104.15	1	172.05	1	276.20
6 October 2018	2018 Japan Open	–	–	1	186.69	1	–
26–28 Oct 2018	2018 Skate Canada International	2	88.87	1	188.38	1	277.25
9–11 Nov 2018	(Japan) 2018 NHK Trophy	1	92.49	1	183.96	1	276.45
6–9 Dec 2018	(Canada) 2018 Grand Prix Final	2	91.679	2	183.43	2	275.10
21–24 Dec 2018	2018–19 Japan Championships	1	102.06	1	187.04	1	289.10
7–10 Feb 2019	(United States) 2019 Four Continents Championships	4	91.76	1	**197.36**	1	289.12
18–24 Mar 2019	(Japan) 2019 World Championships	6	91.40	4	178.92	4	270.32
18–24 Mar 2019	(Japan) 2019 World Team Trophy	3	92.78	3	189.46	2 (3)	282.24

Results in the 2019–20 season
Date	Event	SP		FS		Total	
Date	Event	P	Score	P	Score	P	Score
5 October 2019	2019 Japan Open	–	–	2	169.09	2	–
11–13 Oct 2019	(Finland) 2019 CS Finlandia Trophy	2	92.28	1	162.95	1	255.23
1–3 Nov 2019	2019 Internationaux de France	4	79.05	9	136.79	8	215.84
15–17 Nov 2019	(Russia) 2019 Rostelecom Cup	4	87.29	4	164.95	4	252.24
18–22 Dec 2019	2019–20 Japan Championships	2	105.71	1	184.86	1	290.57
20–23 Feb 2020	(Netherlands) 2020 International Challenge Cup	1	91.71	1	198.70	1	290.41

Results in the 2020–21 season
Date	Event	SP		FS		Total	
Date	Event	P	Score	P	Score	P	Score
24–27 Dec 2020	2020–21 Japan Championships	3	94.22	2	190.59	2	284.81
22–28 Mar 2021	(Sweden) 2021 World Championships	6	92.62	3	184.82	4	277.44
15–18 Apr 2021	(Japan) 2021 World Team Trophy	9	77.46	6	164.96	3 (7)	242.42

Results in the 2021–22 season
Date	Event	SP		FS		Total	
Date	Event	P	Score	P	Score	P	Score
3 October 2021	2021 Japan Open	–	–	1	181.21	1	–
22–24 Oct 2021	(United States) 2021 Skate America	2	89.07	3	181.61	2	270.68
12–14 Nov 2021	(Japan) 2021 NHK Trophy	1	102.58	1	187.57	1	290.15
22–26 Dec 2021	2021–22 Japan Championships	2	101.88	3	193.94	2	295.82
4–7 Feb 2022	(China) 2022 Winter Olympics – Team event	2	105.46	–	–	2	–
8–10 Feb 2022	(China) 2022 Winter Olympics	3	105.90	5	187.10	3	293.00
21–27 Mar 2022	(France) 2022 World Championships	1	**109.63**	1	202.85	1	**312.48**

Results in the 2022–23 season
Date	Event	SP		FS		Total	
Date	Event	P	Score	P	Score	P	Score
8 October 2022	2022 Japan Open	–	–	1	193.80	1	–
28–30 Oct 2022	2022 Skate Canada International	2	89.98	1	183.17	1	273.15
18–20 Nov 2022	(Japan) 2022 NHK Trophy	2	91.66	1	188.10	1	279.76
8–11 Dec 2022	(Italy) 2022 Grand Prix Final	1	99.99	1	**204.47**	1	304.46
21–25 Dec 2022	2022–23 Japan Championships	1	100.45	1	191.28	1	291.73
20–26 Mar 2023	(Japan) 2023 World Championships	1	104.63	1	196.51	1	301.14

Results in the 2023–24 season
Date	Event	SP		FS		Total	
Date	Event	P	Score	P	Score	P	Score
10–12 Nov 2023	2023 Cup of China	1	105.25	2	174.73	2	279.98
24–26 Nov 2023	(Japan) 2023 NHK Trophy	2	100.20	1	186.35	2	286.55
7–10 Dec 2023	(China) 2023 Grand Prix Final	2	106.02	2	191.32	2	297.34
20–24 Dec 2023	2023–24 Japan Championships	1	104.69	2	193.35	1	298.04
18–24 Mar 2024	(Canada) 2024 World Championships	1	107.72	6	173.13	4	280.85

=== Junior level ===
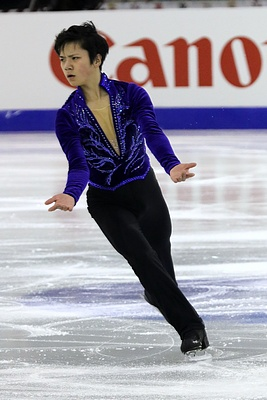
Uno at the 2014–15 Junior Grand Prix Final

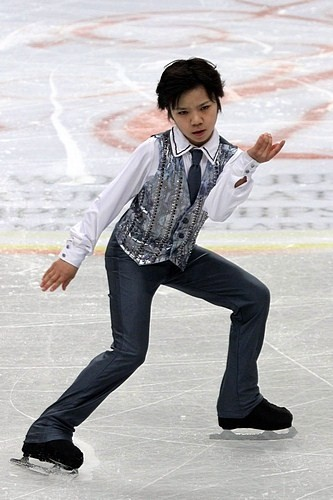
Uno at the 2012 World Junior Championships

- S – senior level
- Small medals for the short program and free skating are only awarded at ISU Championships.

Results in the 2009–10 season
Date	Event	SP		FS		Total	
Date	Event	P	Score	P	Score	P	Score
25–27 Dec 2010	2009–10 Japan Junior Championships	4	52.95	4	95.09	3	148.04

Results in the 2011–12 season
Date	Event	SP		FS		Total	
Date	Event	P	Score	P	Score	P	Score
14–17 Sep 2011	2011 JGP Poland	8	48.69	3	114.55	4	163.24
12–15 Oct 2011	2011 JGP Estonia	4	56.29	3	118.86	3	175.15
25–27 Nov 2011	2011–12 Japan Junior Championships	3	61.56	5	111.90	5	173.46
22–25 Dec 2011	2011–12 Japan Championships (S)	7	63.49	10	126.93	9	190.42
14–16 Jan 2012	(Austria) 2012 Youth Olympics	6	51.52	2	115.63	2	167.15
27–4 Feb March 2012	(Belarus) 2012 World Junior Championships	10	57.71	10	118.21	10	175.92

Results in the 2012–13 season
Date	Event	SP		FS		Total	
Date	Event	P	Score	P	Score	P	Score
26–29 Sep 2012	2012 JGP Slovenia	4	61.42	6	112.92	6	174.34
10–13 Oct 2012	2012 JGP Germany	2	63.48	1	125.00	2	188.48
17–18 Nov 2012	2012–13 Japan Junior Championships	2	66.21	2	124.37	2	190.58
20–24 Dec 2012	2012–13 Japan Championships (S)	10	67.56	11	131.47	11	199.03
25–3 Feb March 2013	(Italy) 2013 World Junior Championships	7	61.66	6	125.42	7	187.08

Results in the 2013–14 season
Date	Event	SP		FS		Total	
Date	Event	P	Score	P	Score	P	Score
28–31 Aug 2013	2013 JGP Latvia	6	58.22	3	117.59	3	175.81
22–24 Oct 2013	2013 JGP Estonia	3	67.09	3	130.73	4	197.82
22–24 Nov 2013	2013–14 Japan Junior Championships	2	71.61	3	134.49	2	206.10
20–23 Dec 2013	2013–14 Japan Championships (S)	6	72.15	7	144.34	7	216.49
10–16 Mar 2014	(Bulgaria) 2014 World Junior Championships	3	70.67	5	135.83	5	206.50

Results in the 2014–15 season
Date	Event	SP		FS		Total	
Date	Event	P	Score	P	Score	P	Score
11–14 Sep 2014	2014 JGP Japan	2	69.78	2	150.21	2	219.99
8–11 Oct 2014	2014 JGP Croatia	1	74.82	1	152.69	1	227.51
22–24 Nov 2014	2014–15 Japan Junior Championships	1	82.72	2	128.00	1	210.72
11–14 Dec 2014	(Spain) 2014 JGP Final	3	75.21	1	163.06	1	238.27
26–28 Dec 2014	2014–15 Japan Championships (S)	3	85.53	3	165.75	2	251.28
9–15 Feb 2015	(South Korea) 2015 Four Continents (S)	2	88.90	5	167.55	5	256.45
2–8 Mar 2015	(Estonia) 2015 World Junior Championships	1	84.87	2	147.67	1	232.54
