= Nicola Todeschini =

Swiss figure skater

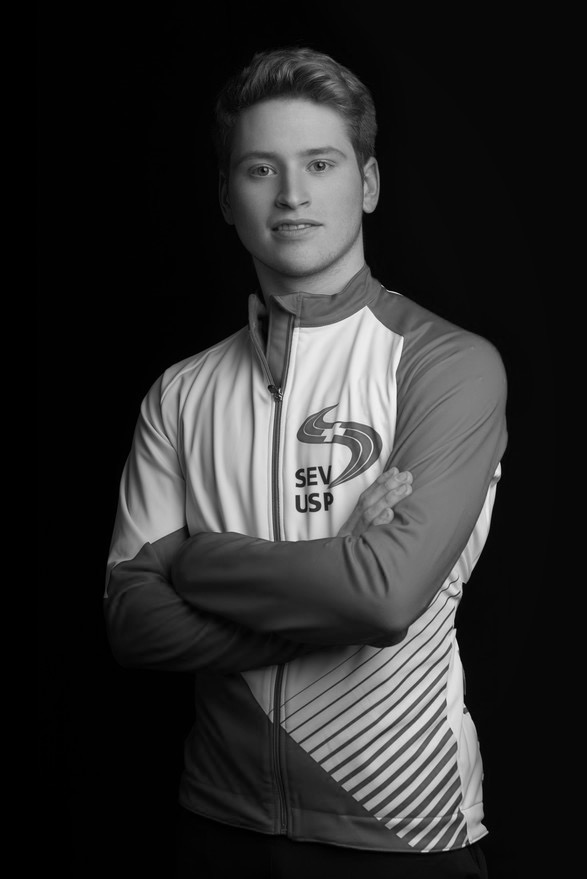

Personal information
- Born: 18 April 1997 (age 29) Biel/Bienne, Switzerland
- Home town: Sonvilier
- Height: 1.73 m (5 ft 8 in)

Figure skating career
- Country: Netherlands (since 2022); Switzerland (until 2022)
- Coach: Aljona Savchenko
- Skating club: CP La Chaux-de-Fonds
- Began skating: 2005

Medal record
Swiss Championships
| Gold medal – first place | 2015 Lugano | Singles |
| Silver medal – second place | 2016 Lausanne | Singles |
| Silver medal – second place | 2018 Neuchâtel | Singles |
| Bronze medal – third place | 2014 La Chaux-de-Fonds | Singles |
| Bronze medal – third place | 2020 Biel/Bienne | Singles |

Nicola Todeschini (born 18 April 1997) is a Swiss figure skater. He is the 2015 Swiss national senior champion and has reached the free skate at two ISU Championships.

As of August 2022, he competes for the Netherlands.

== Personal life ==
Nicola Todeschini was born on 18 April 1997 in Biel/Bienne, Switzerland. He lives in Sonvilier, Switzerland and in La Chaux-de-Fonds.

== Career ==
Todeschini was coached by Myriam Loriol-Oberwiler in Neuchâtel in the 2011–12 season. He was named in the Swiss team to the 2012 Winter Youth Olympics in Innsbruck, Austria, and finished tenth.

His Junior Grand Prix (JGP) debut came in the 2012–13 season. He was sent to the 2013 World Junior Championships in Milan but was eliminated after placing 33rd in the short program. Loriol-Oberwiler coached him until the end of the season. In March 2013, he traveled to Canada to receive coaching from Brian Orser during the off-season.

In 2013–14, Todeschini was coached by Didier Lucine in Annecy, France. He won the senior bronze medal at the Swiss Championships but competed on the junior level internationally.

In 2014–15, Todeschini won the Swiss national senior title, in December 2014. Making his senior international debut, he placed sixth at the Bavarian Open in February 2015. In March, he competed at the 2015 World Junior Championships in Tallinn, Estonia. He qualified for the free skate by placing 19th in the short program and went on to finish 23rd overall.

In the 2015–16 season, Todeschini took silver behind Stéphane Walker at the Swiss Championships. He was selected to compete at the 2016 World Junior Championships in Debrecen, Hungary. He reached the free skate by placing 18th in the short program, and 22nd overall.

== Programs ==
| Season | Short program | Free skating |
|---|---|---|
| 2021–2022 | Ne me quitte pas by Jacques Brel performed by Slimane | In This Shirt by The Irrepressibles |
| 2019–2021 | Pardonne-moi by Johnny Hallyday | Who Wants to Live Forever; Innuendo by Queen |
| 2018–2019 | Dream by Imagine Dragons | Cry Me a River by Michael Bublé |
| 2017–2018 | Smooth by Santana | Fix You; Scientist by Coldplay |
| 2016–2017 | A Day in the Life by The Beatles | Diego libre dans sa tête by Johnny Hallyday |
| 2015–2016 | Still Loving You by the Scorpions | Cry Me a River by Michael Bublé |
| 2014–2015 | Petit Fleur by Henri René; I Love Paris by Sam Butera | Cry Me a River by Michael Bublé |
| 2013–2014 | Petit Fleur by Henri René; I Love Paris by Sam Butera | Romeo and Juliet |
| 2012–2013 | The Artist by Ludovic Bource | Sexbomb; Car Wash by Andy Caine; In the Library by Marius Vries |

== Competitive highlights ==
CS: Challenger Series; JGP: Junior Grand Prix

=== For Switzerland ===
International
| Event | 11–12 | 12–13 | 13–14 | 14–15 | 15–16 | 16–17 | 17–18 | 18–19 | 19–20 | 20–21 | 21–22 |
|---|---|---|---|---|---|---|---|---|---|---|---|
| CS Cup of Austria | | | | | | | | | | | 17th |
| CS Finlandia | | | | | | | 17th | | 12th | | |
| CS Nebelhorn Trophy | | | | | | | | | | | 16th |
| Bavarian Open | | | | 6th | | | | | 5th | | |
| Christmas Cup | | | | | | | | 8th | | | |
| Dragon Trophy | | | | | | | | | 1st | | |
| Egna Trophy | | | | | | | | 3rd | | 4th | |
| Cup of Nice | | | | | 14th | | 14th | | | | |
| Golden Bear | | | | | | | | 9th | | | |
| Jégvirág Cup | | | | | | | | 1st | | | |
| Lombardia Trophy | | | | | 6th | | | | | | |
| Merano Cup | | | | | 4th | 6th | 5th | | | | |
| NRW Trophy | | | | | | | | | | 4th | |
| Sarajevo Open | | | | | 3rd | | | | | | |
| Sportland Trophy | | | | | 5th | | | | | | |
| Prague Ice Cup | | | | | | | | | 3rd | | |
International: Junior
| Junior Worlds | | 33rd | | 23rd | 22nd | | | | | | |
| Youth Olympics | 10th | | | | | | | | | | |
| JGP Austria | | 14th | | | 15th | | | | | | |
| JGP Germany | | 10th | | | | | | | | | |
| JGP Spain | | | | | 16th | | | | | | |
| EYOF | | 14th | | | | | | | | | |
| Bavarian Open | | | 10th | | | | | | | | |
| Challenge Cup | 5th | | | | | | | | | | |
| Crystal Skate | | 2nd | | | | | | | | | |
| Cup of Nice | | | | 5th | | | | | | | |
| Ice Challenge | 3rd | | | | | | | | | | |
| Merano Cup | | | 4th | 1st | | | | | | | |
| Triglav Trophy | 6th | | | | | | | | | | |
National
| Swiss Championships | | | 3rd | 1st | 2nd | 4th | 2nd | | 3rd | C | 4th |
TBD = Assigned; J = Junior level
