= Figure skating at the 2012 Winter Youth Olympics – Boys' singles =

Boys' singles at the I Winter Youth Olympic Games
- Venue: Olympiahalle
- Dates: January 14; January 16
- Competitors: 16 from 15 nations

Medalists
| 1st place, gold medalist(s) | | Yan Han | China |
| 2nd place, silver medalist(s) | | Shoma Uno | Japan |
| 3rd place, bronze medalist(s) | | Feodosi Efremenkov | Russia |

The boys' single skating competition of the 2012 Winter Youth Olympics was held at the Olympiahalle in Innsbruck on January 14 (short program) and January 16 (free skating), 2012.

== Results ==
=== Short program results ===
| Pl. | Name | Nation | TSS | TES | PCS | SS | TR | PE | CH | IN | Ded | StN |
|---|---|---|---|---|---|---|---|---|---|---|---|---|
| 1 | Yan Han | China | 59.65 | 25.44 | 34.21 | 7.14 | 6.71 | 6.71 | 6.79 | 6.86 | 0.00 | 13 |
| 2 | Feodosiy Efremenkov | Russia | 54.70 | 30.34 | 25.36 | 5.36 | 4.82 | 5.18 | 5.07 | 4.93 | 1.00 | 2 |
| 3 | Michael Christian Martinez | Philippines | 54.35 | 26.86 | 27.49 | 5.46 | 5.43 | 5.57 | 5.46 | 5.57 | 0.00 | 9 |
| 4 | Niko Ulanovsky | Germany | 54.03 | 29.17 | 24.86 | 5.07 | 4.79 | 5.11 | 4.96 | 4.93 | 0.00 | 8 |
| 5 | Timofei Novaikin | France | 52.47 | 28.68 | 23.79 | 4.86 | 4.64 | 4.71 | 4.79 | 4.79 | 0.00 | 7 |
| 6 | Shoma Uno | Japan | 51.52 | 23.99 | 28.53 | 5.86 | 5.46 | 5.71 | 5.68 | 5.82 | 1.00 | 3 |
| 7 | Lee June-hyoung | South Korea | 50.93 | 23.47 | 27.46 | 5.68 | 5.36 | 5.46 | 5.50 | 5.46 | 0.00 | 5 |
| 8 | Tino Olenius | Finland | 46.03 | 23.03 | 23.00 | 4.71 | 4.36 | 4.68 | 4.61 | 4.64 | 0.00 | 10 |
| 9 | Nicola Todeschini | Switzerland | 44.02 | 21.38 | 22.64 | 4.64 | 4.36 | 4.57 | 4.57 | 4.50 | 0.00 | 14 |
| 10 | Shu Nakamura | Japan | 42.34 | 19.55 | 23.79 | 5.04 | 4.57 | 4.75 | 4.75 | 4.68 | 1.00 | 1 |
| 11 | John-Olof Hallman | Sweden | 40.50 | 19.75 | 20.75 | 4.29 | 4.00 | 4.11 | 4.21 | 4.14 | 0.00 | 16 |
| 12 | Carlo Vittorio Palermo | Italy | 39.29 | 18.19 | 21.10 | 4.43 | 4.00 | 4.21 | 4.21 | 4.25 | 0.00 | 12 |
| 13 | Yaroslav Paniot | Ukraine | 36.04 | 14.25 | 21.79 | 4.50 | 4.18 | 4.43 | 4.43 | 4.25 | 0.00 | 11 |
| 14 | Alexander Lyan | Kazakhstan | 35.97 | 16.04 | 20.93 | 4.25 | 3.93 | 4.25 | 4.29 | 4.21 | 1.00 | 15 |
| 15 | Manuel Drechsler | Austria | 28.62 | 13.62 | 16.00 | 3.39 | 2.93 | 3.25 | 3.25 | 3.18 | 1.00 | 6 |
| 16 | Timothee Manand | Belgium | 25.06 | 9.42 | 15.64 | 3.29 | 2.86 | 3.21 | 3.14 | 3.14 | 0.00 | 4 |

=== Free program results ===
| Pl. | Name | Nation | TSS | TES | PCS | SS | TR | PE | CH | IN | Ded | StN |
|---|---|---|---|---|---|---|---|---|---|---|---|---|
| 1 | Yan Han | China | 132.80 | 59.28 | 74.52 | 7.61 | 7.25 | 7.54 | 7.43 | 7.43 | 1.00 | 12 |
| 2 | Shoma Uno | Japan | 115.63 | 52.91 | 62.72 | 6.36 | 6.00 | 6.29 | 6.32 | 6.39 | 0.00 | 14 |
| 3 | Shu Nakamura | Japan | 111.88 | 57.88 | 54.00 | 5.57 | 5.18 | 5.36 | 5.43 | 5.46 | 0.00 | 7 |
| 4 | Lee June-hyoung | South Korea | 110.06 | 52.56 | 57.50 | 5.86 | 5.50 | 5.71 | 5.79 | 5.89 | 0.00 | 8 |
| 5 | Feodosiy Efremenkov | Russia | 108.76 | 57.06 | 53.70 | 5.64 | 5.11 | 5.39 | 5.39 | 5.32 | 2.00 | 13 |
| 6 | Niko Ulanovsky | Germany | 104.44 | 52.02 | 52.42 | 5.43 | 5.07 | 5.21 | 5.25 | 5.25 | 0.00 | 16 |
| 7 | Michael Christian Martinez | Philippines | 97.25 | 44.39 | 53.86 | 5.50 | 5.29 | 5.39 | 5.36 | 5.39 | 1.00 | 15 |
| 8 | Yaroslav Paniot | Ukraine | 96.51 | 49.89 | 46.62 | 4.89 | 4.39 | 4.71 | 4.64 | 4.68 | 0.00 | 5 |
| 9 | Timofei Novaikin | France | 94.76 | 45.88 | 49.88 | 5.21 | 4.79 | 4.86 | 5.04 | 5.04 | 1.00 | 11 |
| 10 | Carlo Vittorio Palermo | Italy | 86.26 | 40.76 | 45.50 | 4.64 | 4.39 | 4.54 | 4.61 | 4.57 | 0.00 | 4 |
| 11 | Nicola Todeschini | Switzerland | 84.96 | 40.46 | 44.50 | 4.68 | 4.25 | 4.43 | 4.46 | 4.43 | 0.00 | 6 |
| 12 | Tino Olenius | Finland | 81.09 | 35.87 | 45.22 | 4.79 | 4.25 | 4.57 | 4.54 | 4.46 | 0.00 | 9 |
| 13 | John-Olof Hallmen | Sweden | 79.62 | 36.46 | 44.16 | 4.61 | 4.18 | 4.39 | 4.50 | 4.43 | 1.00 | 10 |
| 14 | Alexander Lyan | Kazakhstan | 59.90 | 23.18 | 37.72 | 3.93 | 3.46 | 3.79 | 3.82 | 3.86 | 1.00 | 3 |
| 15 | Timothee Manand | Belgium | 57.30 | 22.34 | 34.86 | 3.57 | 3.25 | 3.57 | 3.54 | 3.50 | 0.00 | 2 |
| 16 | Manuel Drechsler | Austria | 56.46 | 28.58 | 30.58 | 3.43 | 2.86 | 3.11 | 3.00 | 3.04 | 3.00 | 1 |

=== Overall results ===
| Pl. | Name | Nation | Total points | SP | FS |
|---|---|---|---|---|---|
| 1 | Yan Han | China | 192.45 | 1 | 1 |
| 2 | Shoma Uno | Japan | 167.15 | 6 | 2 |
| 3 | Feodosiy Efremenkov | Russia | 163.46 | 2 | 5 |
| 4 | Lee June-hyoung | South Korea | 160.99 | 7 | 4 |
| 5 | Niko Ulanovsky | Germany | 158.47 | 4 | 6 |
| 6 | Shu Nakamura | Japan | 154.22 | 10 | 3 |
| 7 | Michael Christian Martinez | Philippines | 151.60 | 3 | 7 |
| 8 | Timofei Novaikin | France | 147.23 | 5 | 9 |
| 9 | Yaroslav Paniot | Ukraine | 132.55 | 13 | 8 |
| 10 | Nicola Todeschini | Switzerland | 128.98 | 9 | 11 |
| 11 | Tino Olenius | Finland | 127.12 | 8 | 12 |
| 12 | Carlo Vittorio Palermo | Italy | 125.55 | 12 | 10 |
| 13 | John-Olof Hallman | Sweden | 120.12 | 11 | 13 |
| 14 | Alexander Lyan | Kazakhstan | 95.87 | 14 | 14 |
| 15 | Manuel Drechsler | Austria | 85.08 | 15 | 16 |
| 16 | Timothee Manand | Belgium | 82.36 | 16 | 15 |
