= China Girl: The Classical Album 2 =

Studio album by Vanessa-Mae
- Released: 1997
- Genre: Classical

Vanessa-Mae chronology
The Classical Album 1 (1996)	China Girl: The Classical Album 2 (1997)	Storm (1997)

Professional ratings
Review scores
Source	Rating
Allmusic	4/5 stars

China Girl was the sixth album by classical and pop musician Vanessa-Mae, released in 1997 (see 1997 in music).

China Girl contains three pieces. The first is a recording of the "Butterfly Lovers' Violin Concerto" by He Zhanhao [zh] (何占豪, born 1933) and Chen Gang (陈钢)performed with the London Philharmonic Orchestra conducted by Viktor Fedotov. The second is Vanessa-Mae's arrangement of highlights from Puccini's opera Turandot entitled "Violin Fantasy on Puccini's Turandot" performed with The Orchestra of the Royal Opera House conducted by Viktor Fedotov. The album ends with an original piece called "Happy Valley - The 1997 Re-Unification Overture For Violin, Orchestra And Chorus", a piece written and performed the handover of Hong Kong from the United Kingdom of Great Britain and Northern Ireland to the People's Republic of China.

== Happy Valley ==
The final track, Happy Valley, was created by Vanessa-Mae and the producer/songwriter of her second pop album, Andy Hill. It was performed with The Orchestra of the Royal Opera House and the Chinese Ladies' Choir, conducted by David Arch. The song was selected as the theme for the Re-unification Concert, which was broadcast from Hong Kong's Happy Valley Race Course.

Excerpts from the liner notes on Happy Valley:

The piece starts with a solo violin cadenza-like introduction performed in a traditional Western classical manner. The minor key sets and ominous tentative mood and Chinese voices are heard chanting quietly but quite distinctly a song along the lines of a phrase often attributed to the late Chinese leader Deng Hsaio Ping. Deng was the architect of the post re-unification concept of one country, two systems...The growing rumble of the lower strings and rolling timpani create an almost threatening aural feel for the size of Hong Kong's new masters, China.

The heroic and protesting solo violin grows in anxiety, reaching a climax with the voices, who will also not pipe down. At this point, the low rumbles give way to a galloping rhythm representing the unremitting path of progress and fate. Over this galloping accompaniment, the violin sings a slightly melancholic but lyrical theme, symbolic of Hong Kong's conciliatory approach as it anticipates its new future.

The music is broken by two episodes reflecting on the history of the Chinese. The first of this is an achingly beautiful melody which floats over an ethereal accompaniment on harp, reminiscent of a gracious gentle romance which is very much a part of China's ancient culture. The second episode is filled with angst and difficulties face by that vast country through many periods of turbulent history. As the music develops, the violin and the Chinese voices seem to build a stronger rapport and this growing confidence builds until an important moment when it is clear that the British lease has expired and Hong Kong has reverted to the Chinese. This moment is marked in the music by a new section with a full Chinese folk song sung over a military-style tattoo beaten out, not on military drums, but on Chinese traditional drums including flower drums.

A significant key change to major and a violin part bursting with virtuosity which intermingles with the drum rhythms cement the positive aspects of the re-unification, and demonstrate an optimistic outlook for a prosperous future.

The liner notes also indicate the album is dedicated to the memory of Tan Lip Kee (born 1920, Swatow, China; died 1994, Singapore), Vanessa-Mae's maternal grandfather.

Happy Valley is also used as the background music for the popular Chinese fan dance 千红 (Qian Hong, Thousand Red). The track was also made available on Vanessa-Mae's following album Storm.

== Track listing ==
1. "Butterfly Lovers Violin Concerto" – 26:39
2. "Violin Fantasy on Puccini's 'Turandot'" – 11:24
3. "Happy Valley - The 1997 Re-unification Overture" – 6:33

== Charts ==
Chart	Peak position
Austrian Albums Chart	31
Japanese Albums Chart	113
Swiss Albums Chart	35
UK Albums Chart	56
