= The Ultimate Vanessa-Mae =

Compilation album by Vanessa-Mae
- Released: 13 October 2003
- Genre: Techno/Acoustic/Classical
- Length: 62:02
- Label: EMI

Vanessa-Mae chronology
The Best of Vanessa-Mae (2002)	The Ultimate Vanessa-Mae (2003)	Choreography (2004)

The Ultimate Vanessa-Mae is a compilation album by Vanessa-Mae, released on EMI in 2003 (see 2003 in music).

== Track listing ==
1. "Classical Gas" (Mason Williams) – 3:48
2. "I Feel Love" (Pete Bellotte, Giorgio Moroder, Donna Summer) – 4:26
3. "Picante" (Vanessa-Mae, Martin Glover) – 2:59
4. "Red Hot" (Vanessa-Mae, Ian Wherry) – 4:34
5. "Yantra" (Vanessa-Mae, Glover) – 5:52
6. "Bach Street Prelude" (Vanessa-Mae, J.S. Bach, Andy Hill) – 4:29
7. "Leyenda" (Vanessa-Mae, Hill) – 6:35
8. "Cotton Eye Joe" (Live) (Traditional) – 3:19
9. "(I) Can, Can (You?)" (Vanessa-Mae, Hill, Jacques Offenbach) – 3:42
10. "Widescreen" (Mike Batt) – 4:01
11. "Night Flight" (Vanessa-Mae, Glover) – 4:41
12. "Toccata and Fugue in d minor, BWV 565 (Live)" (Bach, Batt) – 4:41
13. "The Original Four Seasons, Op. 8, No. 1 "Spring": Allegro" (Vanessa-Mae, Antonio Vivaldi, Pamela Nicholson) – 3:11
14. "Scherzo in C Minor for Violin & Piano" (Johannes Brahms) – 5:22
