= Choreography (Vanessa-Mae album) =

Studio album by Vanessa-Mae
- Released: 18 October 2004
- Genre: Classical Crossover
- Length: 43:18
- Label: Sony Classical

Vanessa-Mae chronology
The Ultimate Vanessa-Mae (2003)	Choreography (2004)

Choreography is the eighth and most recent album by Vanessa-Mae featuring work by Vangelis, Bill Whelan, A. R. Rahman, Tolga Kashif, and Walter Taieb. She performs with the Royal Philharmonic Orchestra.

"Emerald Tiger" is a composition by Riverdance's Whelan, an Irish/Asian fusion. "Raga's Dance", by Indian Composer A. R. Rahman, is a piece that mixes Carnatic instruments and vocals to a large symphonic orchestration. "Bolero for Violin and Orchestra" is a tribute to Ravel's Boléro, and features a darbuka. "Tribal Gathering" is a minimalist composition in the vein of John Adams but with a live Afro percussion rhythm beneath. "Bolero", "Tango de los Exilados", and "Tribal Gathering" were composed by the European composer Walter Taieb (The Alchemist's Symphony). The track "Handel's Minuet" was produced by Vanessa-Mae, and is the first, and currently only, track she has ever produced for one of her own albums.

== Track listing ==
1. "Sabre Dance" (Aram Khachaturian) – 6:01
2. "Roxane's Veil" (Vangelis) – 4:42
3. "Bolero for Violin and Orchestra" (Walter Taieb) – 5:06
4. "Tango de los Exilados" (Walter Taieb) – 3:55
5. "The Havana Slide" (Jon Cohen) – 3:45
6. "Emerald Tiger" (Bill Whelan) – 3:50
7. "Tribal Gathering" (Walter Taieb & Vanessa-Mae) – 3:37
8. "Raga's Dance" (A.R. Rahman) – 5:26
9. "Moroccan Roll" (Jon Cohen, Kad Achouri & Vanessa-Mae) – 3:08
10. "Handel's Minuet" (George Friederic Handel) – 3:50

== Chart performance ==
Chart	Peak position
UK Albums Chart	66
