= Storm (Vanessa-Mae album) =

Studio album by Vanessa-Mae
- Released: 27 October 1997
- Recorded: Comforts Place, Lingfield, Surrey, UK
- Genre: Classical, Chamber music
- Length: 69:30
- Label: EMI (UK); Virgin (U.S.)
- Producer: Andy Hill

Vanessa-Mae chronology
China Girl (1997)	Storm (1997)	The Original Four Seasons and the Devil's Trill Sonata (1999)

Singles from Storm
- 1. "Storm" Released: 13 October 1997; 2. "I Feel Love" Released: 8 December 1997

Professional ratings
Review scores
Source	Rating
AllMusic	2/5 stars

Storm is the seventh album by classical and pop musician Vanessa-Mae. It was released in the UK on her 19th birthday, 27 October 1997.

== Track listing ==
1. "Summer Haze" 3:11
2. "Storm" (cover of Antonio Vivaldi: The Four Seasons - "Summer: III. Presto") 3:43
3. "Retro" 3:57
4. "Bach Street Prelude" 4:25
5. "Leyenda" 6:32
6. "(I) Can, Can (You?)" 3:40
7. "Happy Valley" 6:32
8. "A Poet's Quest (For a Distant Paradise)" 4:31
9. "Embrasse Moi (You Fly Me Up)" 5:03
10. "Aurora" 4:56
11. "I'm a Doun" 4:28
12. "I Feel Love" (cover of Donna Summer) 6:57
13. "Hocus Pocus" (cover of Focus) 3:14
14. "The Blessed Spirits" 8:16

== Charts ==
Chart	Peak position
Austrian Albums Chart	4
Dutch Albums Chart	48
German Albums Chart	55
Finnish Albums Chart	18
Hungarian Albums Chart	33
New Zealand Albums Chart	37
Swiss Albums Chart	26
UK Albums Chart	27

== Sales and certifications ==
Country	Certification (sales thresholds)
Austria	Gold
United Kingdom	Silver
