= Subject to Change (Vanessa-Mae album) =

Studio album by Vanessa-Mae
- Released: 14 May 2001
- Genre: electropop; Techno; acoustic; classical
- Length: 62:02
- Label: EMI
- Producer: Youth

Vanessa-Mae chronology
The Classical Collection: Part 1 (2000)	Subject to Change (2001)	The Best of Vanessa Mae (2002)

Singles from Subject to Change
- 1. "Destiny" Released: 2001; 2. "White Bird" Released: 16 July 2001

Subject to Change is a pop album by Vanessa-Mae, released in the UK by EMI on 14 May 2001. The opening track, "Yantra", features vocals by Le Mystère des Voix Bulgares.

== Track listing ==
1. "Yantra" (Vanessa-Mae, Youth) – 5:52
2. "White Bird" (David LaFlamme) – 5:33
3. "Picante" (Vanessa-Mae, Youth) – 2:57
4. "Destiny" (Vanessa-Mae, Youth) – 6:48
5. "Night Flight" (Vanessa-Mae, Youth) – 4:41
6. "Clear Like Ice" (Vanessa-Mae, Youth) – 5:09
7. "Laughing Buddha" (Vanessa-Mae, Youth) – 6:08
8. "Pasha" (Vanessa-Mae, Youth) – 4:27
9. "Solace" (Vanessa-Mae, Youth) – 4:33
10. "Love is Only a Game" (Vanessa-Mae, Youth) – 2:53
11. "Deep South" (Vanessa-Mae, Youth) – 6:19
12. "Jamais" (Vanessa-Mae, Youth) – 9:06

== Chart performance ==
Chart	Peak position
Austrian Albums Chart	39
German Albums Chart	52
Hungarian Albums Chart	28
Polish Albums Chart	39
Swiss Albums Chart	58
UK Albums Chart	58
