= Tchaikovsky & Beethoven Violin Concertos (album) =

Tchaivoksky & Beethoven Violin Concertos

Studio album by Vanessa-Mae
- Released: May 1991
- Recorded: October 1990
- Genre: Classical
- Length: 64:51
- Label: French release/Trittico
- Producer: ???

Vanessa-Mae chronology
| Kids' Classics (1991) | Tchaivoksky & Beethoven Violin Concertos (1991) | The Violin Player (1995) |

Tchaikovsky & Beethoven Violin Concertos is the name of one of three conventional classical albums by classical musician Vanessa-Mae before her rise to pop stardom. It was released in 1991 on the Trittico label.

At age 13, Vanessa-Mae was the youngest in violinist in the world to have recorded both the Tchaikovsky and Beethoven violin concertos.

== Track listing ==
Tchaikovsky: Violin Concerto in D, OP. 35 32:14

1. Allegro moderato - Allegro giusto 17:19
2. Canzonetta: Andante 5:54
3. Finale: Allegro vivacissimo 9:06

Beethoven: Violin Concerto in D, Op. 61 40:42

4. Allegro, ma non troppo (22:42)
5. Larghetto (8:05)
6. Rondo allegro (9:50)

London Symphony Orchestra conducted by Kees Bakels

"Total: 73:04"
