= The Violin Player =

Studio album by Vanessa-Mae
- Released: Feb. 1995
- Recorded: 1993–1994
- Studios: Abbey Road; Whitfield Street; (London, England)
- Genres: Synth-pop; acoustic; classical
- Length: 42:50
- Label: EMI
- Producers: Mike Batt; Ian Wherry; Vanessa-Mae

Vanessa-Mae chronology
Tchaivoksky & Beethoven Violin Concertos (1991)	The Violin Player (1995)	The Alternative Record from Vanessa Mae (1996)

Singles from The Violin Player
- 1. "Toccata & Fugue" Released: 16 January 1995; 2. "Red Hot" Released: 8 May 1995; 3. "Classical Gas" Released: 6 November 1995

Professional ratings
Review scores
Source	Rating
AllMusic	4/5 stars

The Violin Player is the first synth-pop album by classical and pop musician Vanessa-Mae, released in 1995. It is the first album Vanessa-Mae released on the EMI label. The album was mostly produced by Mike Batt.

== Content ==
The Violin Player features a varied blend of music – covers of classical music (J.S. Bach's Toccata and Fugue in D minor), remakes of old favourites (including American composer Mason Williams' "Classical Gas"), original compositions (seven tracks composed by British musician and songwriter Mike Batt), and one original track by Vanessa-Mae herself, co-written with Ian Wherry ("Red Hot").

== Singles ==
Three singles were released from the album: "Toccata and Fugue", which reached number 16 in the UK Singles Chart, "Red Hot", which reached number 37 and "Classical Gas", which reached number 41.

== Commercial performance ==
The Violin Player reached number 11 in the UK Albums Chart in February 1995, and was certified Gold by the BPI in June 1995. It has sold over 1.2 million copies worldwide. The album has been reissued as a multi-channel hybrid SACD by EMI Music Hong Kong.

== Track listing ==
All tracks are written by Mike Batt, except where noted.

No.	Title	Writer(s)	Length
1.	"Toccata and Fugue in D Minor"	Johann Sebastian Bach, arr: Batt	7:47
2.	"Contradanza"		3:49
3.	"Classical Gas"	Mason Williams	3:21
4.	"Theme from Caravans"		5:06
5.	"Warm Air"		3:38
6.	"Jazz Will Eat Itself"		3:30
7.	"Widescreen"		3:58
8.	"Tequila Mockingbird"	Ludwig van Beethoven, arr: Batt	3:26
9.	"City Theme"		4:32
10.	"Red Hot"	Ian Wherry, Vanessa-Mae	3:16
11.	"Classical Gas" (reggae version; Aswad and Vanessa-Mae (bonus track))
Total length:			46:31

== Personnel ==
Credits adapted from the album's liner notes.

=== Musicians ===
- Vanessa-Mae – violin
- Mike Batt – keyboards (tracks 1–9)
- Gareth Cousins – synthesisers (tracks 1–9)
- Martin Bliss – guitars (track 10)
- Clem Clempson – guitars (tracks 1–9)
- Dick Morgan – oboe (track 1)
- Maurice Murphy – trumpet (track 1)
- Royal Philharmonic Orchestra – orchestra; conducted by Mike Batt
- Phil Todd – saxophones
- Vasko Vassilev – violin/viola section (track 10)
- Ian Wherry – keyboards (track 10)

=== Production ===
- Tracks 1–9 produced and arranged by Mike Batt
- Tracks 1-9 engineered by Gareth Cousins
- Track 10 produced and arranged by Ian Wherry and Vanessa-Mae
- Track 10 programmed by Ian Wherry; mix engineer: Ben Robbins
- Mastered by Ray Staff
- Music typesetting: John Zaradin
- Photography: John Paul
- Sleeve by Stuart @ Peacock Marketing Design
- Recorded and engineered by Gareth Cousins at Abbey Road Studios and Whitfield Street Recording Studios, London

== Charts ==
=== Weekly charts ===
Chart (1995)	Peak position
Australian Albums Chart	2
Austrian Albums Chart	1
Dutch Albums Chart	47
Finnish Albums Chart	2
German Albums Chart	20
Hungarian Albums Chart	12
New Zealand Albums Chart	2
Norwegian Albums Chart	28
Swedish Albums Chart	52
Swiss Albums Chart	14
UK Albums Chart	11

=== Year-end charts ===
Chart (1996)	Position
German Albums Chart	83

== Certifications ==
Region	Certification	Certified units/sales
Austria (IFPI Austria)	Platinum	50,000^{*}
Belgium (BRMA)	Gold	25,000^{*}
Finland (Musiikkituottajat)	Platinum	54,251
Germany (BVMI)	Gold	250,000^{^}
Netherlands (NVPI)	Platinum	25,000^{^}
New Zealand (RMNZ)	Platinum	15,000^{^}
Poland (ZPAV)	Platinum	100,000^{*}
Spain (Promusicae)	Gold	50,000^{^}
Switzerland (IFPI Switzerland)	Gold	25,000^{^}
United Kingdom (BPI)	Gold	100,000^{^}
Summaries
Europe (IFPI)	Platinum	1,000,000^{*}
^{*} Sales figures based on certification alone.^{^} Shipments figures based on certification alone.
