= Kids' Classics =

Studio album by Vanessa-Mae
- Released: 1991
- Genre: Classical
- Length: 58:33
- Label: Tritico

Vanessa-Mae chronology
Violin (1990)	Kids' Classics (1991)	Tchaikovsky & Beethoven Violin Concertos (1991)

Kids' Classics is an album by classical musician Vanessa-Mae, released in 1991 on the Tritico record label. It was recorded in association with the New Belgian Chamber Orchestra, conducted by Nicholas Cleobury. The music was recorded in Ghent, Belgium. The album, as the title suggests, was geared towards younger listeners, but comprises primarily well-known and recognized compositions.

== Track listing ==
1. "Figaro" (Mario Castelnuovo-Tedesco, Jascha Heifetz) – 5:29
2. "Liebesleid" (Fritz Kreisler) – 2:54
3. "Liebesfreud" (Kreisler) – 3:04
4. "Schön Rosmarin" (Kreisler) – 1:57
5. "La Campanella" (Niccolò Paganini, Kreisler) – 5:22
6. "Air on the G String" (J.S. Bach, August Wilhelmj) – 2:17
7. "Frère Jacques" (Traditional) – 8:54
8. "Yellow Submarine" (Paul McCartney) – 1:38
9. "Salut d'Amour" (Edward Elgar) – 2:26
10. "Russian Dance" (Pyotr Ilyich Tchaikovsky) – 4:00
11. "Lullaby" (Johannes Brahms) – 2:00
12. "Les Parapluies de Cherbourg" (Michel Legrand, Vanessa-Mae) – 1:46
13. "Summertime" (George Gershwin, Heifetz) – 1:52
14. "My Favourite Things" (Richard Rodgers) – 1:16
15. "One Moment in Time" (John Bettis, Vanessa-Mae) – 4:36
16. "Tambourin Chinois" (Kreisler) – 3:58
17. "Chinese Folk Tune" (Sze-Du) – 2:36
18. "Pink Panther" (Henry Mancini) – 2:28
