= Vanessa-Mae =

British-Thai violinist and skier (born 1978)

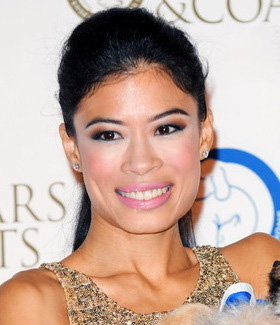
- Vanessa-Mae in 2014
- Born: Vanessa-Mae Vanakorn Nicholson; 27 October 1978 (age 48); Singapore
- Other name: Vanessa Vanakorn
- Occupations: Violinist; musician
- Years active: 1990–present
- Partner: Lionel Catalan (1999-present)
- Musical career
- Genres: Classical; techno; synth-pop; electropop; fantasia
- Instrument: Violin
- Labels: Sony Classical/SME; Virgin/EMI; EMI Classics
- Website: https://www.vanessamaemusic.com/

Vanessa-Mae (Chinese: 陈美; pinyin: Chén Měi; born 27 October 1978), also called Vanessa-Mae Vanakorn Nicholson, is a Singaporean-born British violinist and skier with Thai heritage from her father. Her album sales reached several million by 2006, making her the wealthiest entertainer aged under 30 in the United Kingdom at that time. She is known for fusing classical and popular genres, which she calls "violin techno-acoustic fusion". This crossover style combines her classical violin training with electronic music influences like techno and synth-pop, as seen for example in the title track from her album Storm from 1997.

As a skier, she competed under the name Vanessa Vanakorn (Thai: วาเนสซ่า วรรณกร, romanized: Wa-nes-sa Wan-na-kon; her father's surname) for Thailand in alpine skiing at the 2014 Winter Olympics. She was initially banned from skiing by the International Ski Federation (FIS) after participating in a qualifying race allegedly organised to enable her to qualify for the Winter Olympics. An appeal to the Court of Arbitration for Sport led to the ban being nullified, citing lack of evidence for her own wrongdoing or any manipulation. The FIS later issued an apology to her.

== Musical career ==
Vanessa-Mae made her professional debut at age ten at a music festival in Germany. At age thirteen, she became the youngest soloist to record both the Beethoven and Tchaikovsky violin concertos, according to Guinness World Records.

Her first pop-style album, The Violin Player, produced and mainly written by Mike Batt and selling four million copies, was released in 1995. She appeared on the 1997 Janet Jackson album The Velvet Rope playing a violin solo on the song "Velvet Rope".

Vanessa-Mae appeared in producer George Martin's compilation and covers album In My Life in 1998. She is featured on Track No. 5 with her violin rendition of the 1969 Beatles song "Because".

She was managed by her mother until Vanessa-Mae fired her in 1999.

In May 1998, she was part of the interval act at the Eurovision Song Contest taking part in Birmingham at the National Indoor Arena.

In June 1999 she played at the Michael Jackson & Friends concerts in Seoul and Munich.

On 7 March 2002 Vanessa-Mae performed a variation of Antonio Vivaldi: The Four Seasons – "Summer: III. Presto" during the opening ceremonies of the 2002 Winter Paralympics.

In April 2006, Vanessa-Mae was ranked as the wealthiest young entertainer under 30 in the UK in the Sunday Times Rich List 2006, having an estimated fortune of about £32 million.

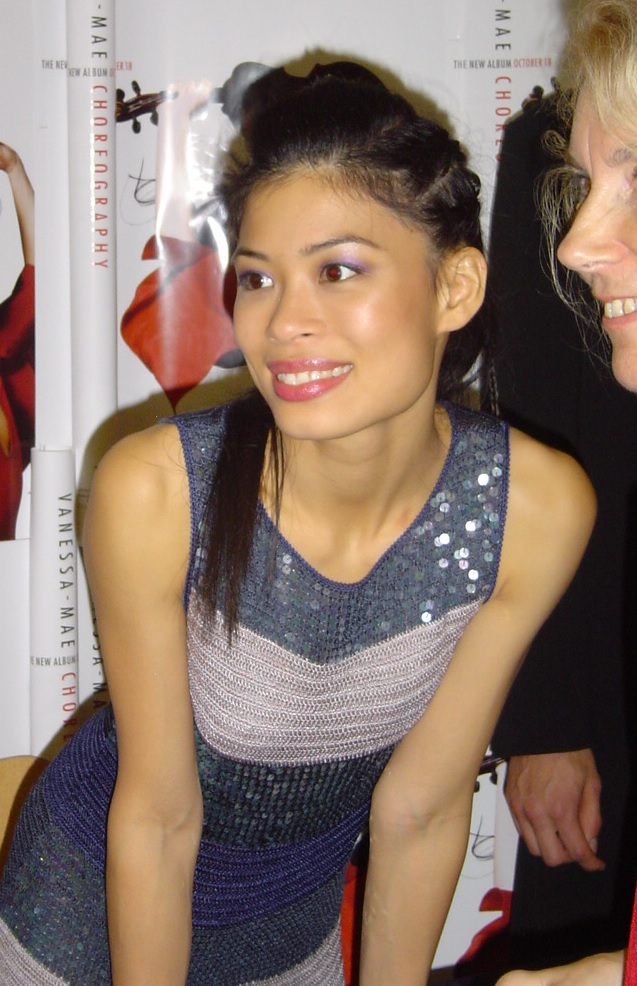
Vanessa-Mae in 2004

In October 2011, Vanessa-Mae performed for Chechnya's leader Ramzan Kadyrov during his birthday celebration in Grozny, reportedly receiving US$500,000 for her appearance.

=== Composition ===
Vanessa-Mae has occasionally recorded her own compositions. Her 1997 album China Girl: The Classical Album 2 included two pieces in which she shared a writing credit: Violin Fantasy on Puccini's 'Turandot' and Reunification Overture, marking the reunification of China and Hong Kong.

In 2017, Classic FM compiled a list of the 300 best selling classical albums in the 25 years it has been running. Vanessa-Mae entered three times. The Classical Album 1 reached 244, Storm reached 135 and her debut mainstream album The Violin Player is the 76th best selling. The site claims that her total album sales make "her the biggest-selling solo violinist in the chart".

== Skiing career ==
Vanessa-Mae stated that she "started skiing around the same time as I began playing the piano, at around four, before moving to the violin at five", and that it had been her "dream to be a ski bum since I was 14." In 2009 Vanessa-Mae took up residence in the Swiss alpine resort of Zermatt. In August 2010, she told The Telegraph, "I am British, but realistically there is no way I could represent my own country, but because my natural father is Thai, they have accepted me." She registered as a Thai alpine skier.

=== Qualifying event ===
In 2014, Thailand had no Alpine skiers in the top 500, and Olympic rules allowed such countries to send one man and one woman to the Olympics slalom and giant slalom, based on alternative criteria: the skier must have 140 points or less, smaller scores being better under the International Ski Federation (FIS) system, while starting at least five internationally recognised slalom or giant slalom events.

At the request of Vanessa-Mae's management and the Thai Olympic Committee, a giant slalom competition was organised by the Alpine Ski Club Triglav and took place on 18 and 19 January 2014 at Krvavec in Slovenia, and would be the last chance for Vanessa-Mae to achieve the FIS-recognised score to qualify for the February 2014 Olympics. The event included a national junior championship, in which she was 14 years older than any of the competition.

The event put her score under the 140-point average, dropping it from 269.44 on 11 January to 131.15 at the end of 19 January. Her manager Giles Holland said "It would appear that she's done it. She's done it by a whisker, but she's done it." FIS confirmed her eligibility to compete in the 2014 Olympics, with Ana Jelusic of the FIS mentioning that the Krvavec results "ticks all the boxes".

A Swiss race on 3 and 4 February raised her score to 171.09.

=== Olympics ===
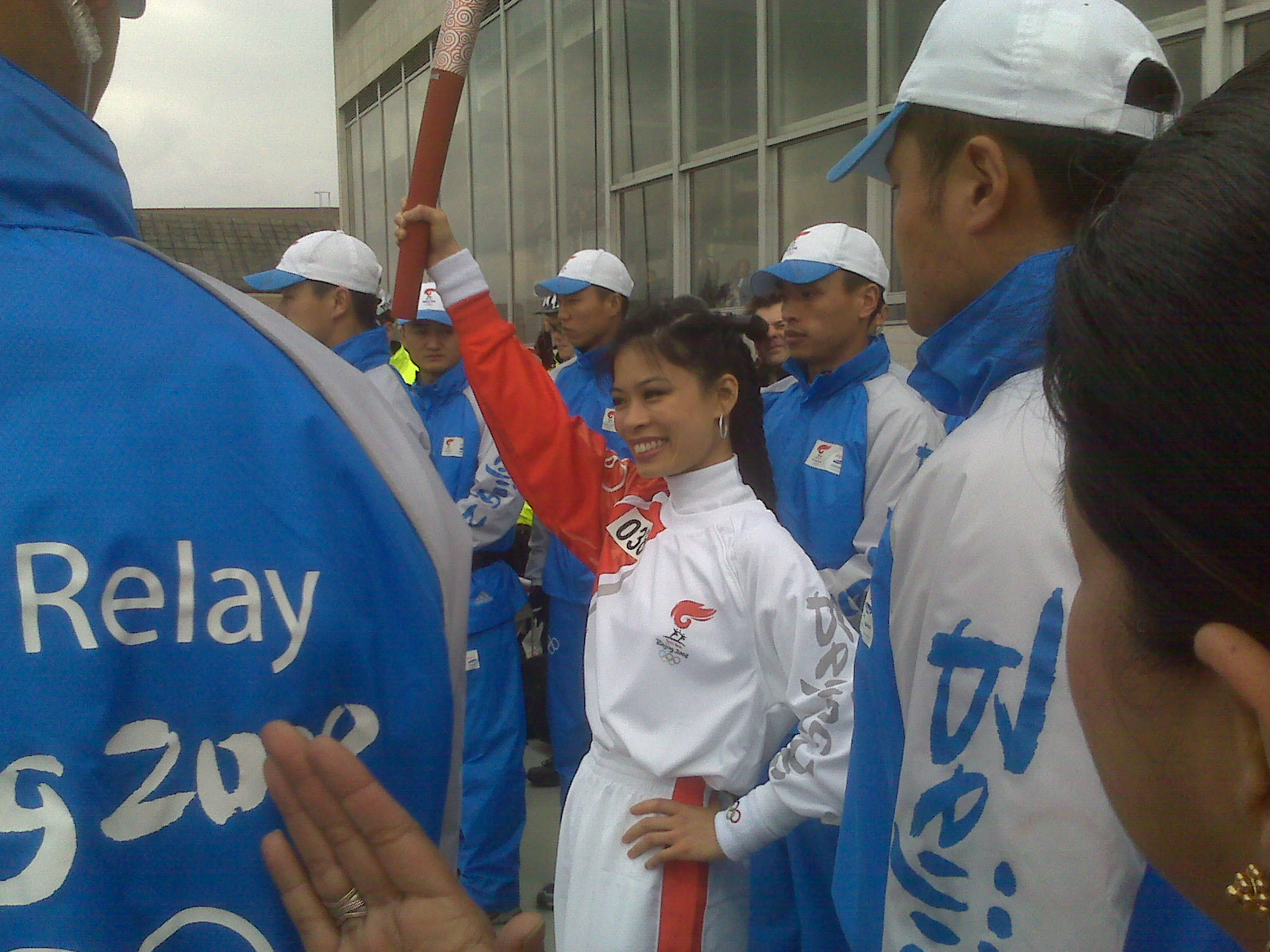
Vanessa-Mae carrying the Olympic torch at the Southbank Centre in 2008

She was one of two alpine skiers who represented Thailand at the 2014 Winter Olympics, where she competed under the name of "Vanessa Vanakorn" (วาเนสซ่า เมย์ ตัน วรรณกร; Vanessa May Tan Vanakorn).

On 18 February 2014, Vanakorn finished 67th of 90 skiers, with a time of 1:44.86 on her first run at giant slalom, 26.98 seconds behind the leader and 7.83 seconds to Xia Lina, who finished ahead of her. She started in the 87th position, representing her relative ranking in the world giant slalom rankings. In run 2, she had a time of 1:42.11, 24.21 seconds behind the leader of run 2 and 11:35 seconds behind Xia, also ahead of Vanakorn. She started 74th in run 2, the last starter for run 2. At the end of the event, she had a total time of 3:26.97, 50.10 seconds behind the gold medal winner, Tina Maze of Slovenia. She was last of the 67 racers who finished, although 23 other racers failed to complete the race.

==== Olympic results ====
Year
Year	Age	Slalom	Giant; Slalom	Super-G	Downhill	Combined	Team Event
2014	35	—	67	—	—	—	—

==== Investigation and appeal ====
On 10 July 2014 four Slovenian ski competition organisers were reported to have each been given four-year bans on working with Slovenian Ski Union (Smučarska zveza Slovenije) and FIS competitions because of supposedly fixed Sochi Winter Olympics qualifications for the Thai ski team at Krvavec in January 2014 – with the only goal to successfully qualify Vanessa Mae. However, no formal bans were ever handed out.

On 11 November 2014, the FIS Hearing Panel issued its own findings about the Krvavec event less than 10 months earlier: The weather was such that no regular race could be held; the competition's referee said that "any comparable competition in Slovenia would have been cancelled". A previously retired competitor took part in the alleged competition solely to lower (improve) the scores of the participants. The official results of "approximately 23 competitors" for the two races on 18 January included results at least two people who in fact did not attend. The official results for two giant slalom races on 19 January also included results for a person who was not even present at the Krvavec competition. One competitor who fell was given an official timing 10 seconds better than reality, and put in second place in the official results. At least one participant started outside the starting wand; afterward, the starter manually triggered the starting wand.

The Hearing Panel issued a worldwide four-year ban against Vanessa-Mae, two-year ban against the Chief of Race Borut Hrobat, and one-year bans against the FIS Technical Delegate, Chief of Timing, Referee, and Starter. FIS president Gian-Franco Kasper commented to Associated Press concerning the violations: "Those who have been sanctioned have been sanctioned for good reason. At first we were laughing when we heard it. But then we realised it's quite a serious thing."

As two or more participants worked in combination to violate the rules, the FIS Hearing Panel recommended that all four events during the Krvavec competition be annulled. The Hearing Panel noted that, if the results were to be annulled by the FIS Council, it will mean that Vanessa-Mae, Federica Selva of San Marino, and Ieva Januškevičiūtė of Lithuania will have not qualified for the 2014 Olympic Games. Vanessa-Mae issued a statement calling the ban "nonsensical" and saying "we will" appeal to the Court of Arbitration for Sport.

The FIS Council met on 18 November and cancelled the results of "all four giant slalom races" at Krvavec and issued a press release saying that "Vanessa Vanakorn (THA) who competed in the Sochi 2014 Olympic Winter Games therefore did not qualify and should not have been participating in the Sochi 2014 Games." The FIS Council was of the opinion that Federica Selva and Ieva Januškevičiūtė "were victims of the manipulated races", and forwarded the information to the International Olympic Committee. Vanessa-Mae filed appeals with the Court of Arbitration for Sport on 4 December 2014 against both the FIS Hearing Panel and the FIS Council.

On 19 June 2015 the Court of Arbitration for Sport (CAS) voided Vanessa-Mae's four-year ban, saying there was a lack of evidence that she herself manipulated the races; but the CAS dismissed her appeal to restore the qualifying results, confirming that the qualifying races "were so defective that their results and qualification points gained therefrom could not stand", and therefore "Vanessa Vanakorn remains ineligible to compete in the Sochi 2014 Olympic Winter Games". The CAS's decision also awarded an amount of money to be paid by the FIS to Vanessa-Mae.

Despite Vanessa-Mae's successful result in nullifying the FIS race ban at the CAS appeal, there was still some doubt over the status of her races at the 2014 Winter Olympics. However, in January 2016 the media announced that the International Olympic Committee had confirmed that Vanessa-Mae could be called an Olympian.

In 2016, Vanessa-Mae settled her defamation lawsuit against the FIS, in which the FIS made an "appropriate payment", the amount of which was not disclosed. The FIS issued a full apology for its claims of race-fixing, and stated "Ms. Vanakorn and her entourage did not in any way fix, contrive or improperly influence the result, progress, conduct or any other aspect of the FIS-approved races." (Note: Vanakorn here refers to Vanessa-Mae, using her Thai surname.)

=== Post-appeal ===
Vanessa-Mae returned to skiing in 2017, to attempt to qualify for the 2018 Winter Olympics. She withdrew from competition in January 2018 after a shoulder injury. With her withdrawal, the placement for Thailand went to 21-year-old Alexia Arisarah Schenkel.

== Personal life ==
Vanessa-Mae's long-term boyfriend is Frenchman Lionel Catalan. She has expressed a lack of interest in marriage, saying "you don't need a ring to say I love you". She has also talked about her decision not to have biological children, but is open to adopting.

== Awards and nominations ==
Award	Year	Nominee(s)	Category	Result	Ref.
World Music Awards	1997	Herself	World's Best Selling Classical Artist	Won	
Žebřík Music Awards	1999	Herself	Best International Instrumentalist	Nominated	

== Discography ==
- Violin (1990)
- Kids' Classics (1991)
- Tchaikovsky & Beethoven Violin Concertos (1991)
- The Violin Player (1995)
- The Classical Album 1 (1996)
- China Girl: The Classical Album 2 (1997)
- Storm (1997)
- The Original Four Seasons and the Devil's Trill Sonata: The Classical Album 3 (1999)
- Subject to Change (2001)
- Choreography (2004)

== Filmography ==
- Live at the Royal Albert Hall, The Red Hot Tour (1995) (concert documentary)
- Live at the Berlin Philharmonie (1997)
- The Alternative Classical Concert - Live at the Symphony Hall Birmingham (1997)
- Storm on World Tour (1998)
- The Violin Fantasy (1998)
- Arabian Nights (2000) (actor in the series)
- The Making of Me (2008) (subject of episode 3)
